= Marie de' Medici cycle =

Paintings by Peter Paul Rubens

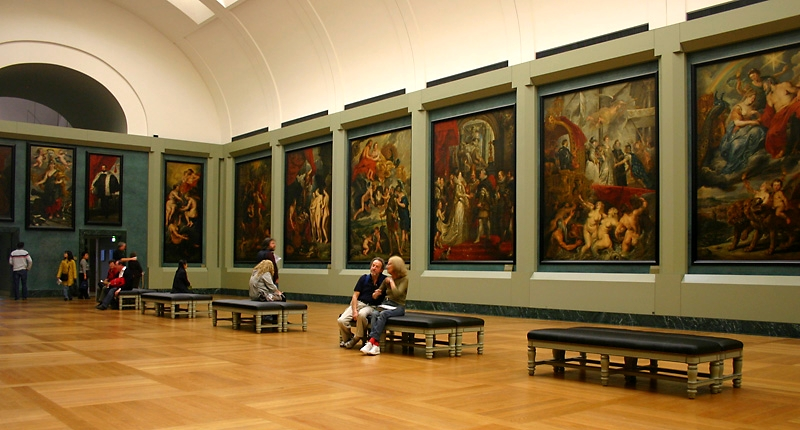
The cycle in the Richelieu wing of the Louvre

The Marie de' Medici Cycle is a series of twenty-four paintings by Peter Paul Rubens commissioned by Marie de' Medici, widow of Henry IV of France, for the Luxembourg Palace in Paris. Rubens received the commission in the autumn of 1621. After negotiating the terms of the contract in early 1622, the project was to be completed within two years, coinciding with the marriage of Marie's daughter, Henrietta Maria. Twenty-one of the paintings depict Marie's own struggles and triumphs in life. The remaining three are portraits of herself and her parents. The paintings now hang in the Louvre in Paris.

== Commission ==
Much speculation exists on the exact circumstances under which Marie de' Medici decided to commission Rubens to paint "such a grandiose project, conceived in truly heroic proportions". John Coolidge suggests the cycle may have even been commissioned to rival another famous series of Rubens, The Constantine Tapestries, which he designed in his studio at the same time as the first several paintings of the Medici Cycle. It has also been suggested that Rubens prepared a number of oil sketches, by the request of Louis XIII, the son of Marie de' Medici and successor to the throne, which may have influenced the Queen's decision to commission Rubens for the cycle by the end of the year 1621. The immortalizing of her life, however, seems to be the most apparent reason for the Queen's choice to commission a painter who was capable of executing such a demanding task. Peter Paul Rubens had already established himself as an exceptional painter and also had the advantage of sustaining close ties with several important people of the time, including Marie de' Medici's sister, the wife of one of Rubens's first important patrons, the Duke of Gonzaga. The information about the commission in the contract Rubens signed is far from detailed and focuses mainly on the number of pictures in the cycle dedicated to the Queen's life, and is far less specific when it comes to the cycle praising her husband Henry IV. The contract stated that Rubens was to paint all the figures, which presumably allowed him to employ assistants for backgrounds and details.

== Marie de' Medici ==
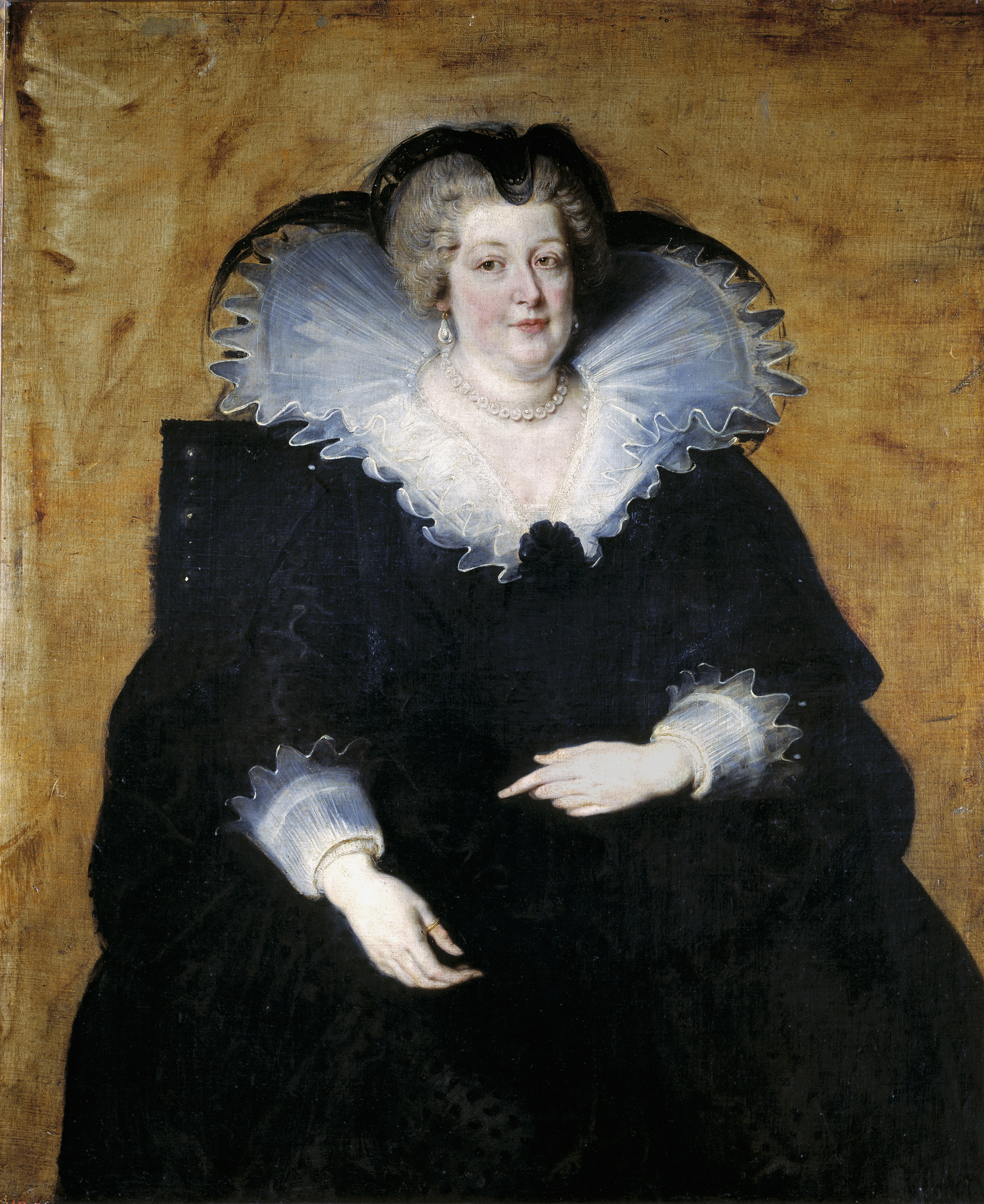
Maria de' Medici

Marie de' Medici became the second wife to King Henry IV of France in a marriage by proxy on 5 October 1600 by the power invested in her uncle, Ferdinando I de' Medici, Grand Duke of Tuscany. When Henry was assassinated in 1610, Louis XIII, his son and successor to the throne, was only eight years old. Louis' mother, Marie, acted as his regent as commanded by the Frankish Salic law in case of an infant ruler. However, even after Louis came of age at thirteen in 1614, the queen continued ruling in his stead. In 1617, Louis XIII finally decided to take governing matters in his own hands at the age of fifteen and the queen was exiled to Blois.

Louis and his mother were not reconciled for over four years, and finally in 1621 Marie was permitted to return to Paris. Upon her return, Marie focused on building and decorating the Luxembourg Palace, an enormous undertaking in which Peter Paul Rubens played a key role. Rubens, then court painter to the Duchy of Mantua under Vincenzo I Gonzaga, had first met Marie at her proxy wedding in Florence in 1600. In 1621, Marie de' Medici commissioned Rubens to paint two large series depicting the lives of herself and her late husband, Henry IV, to adorn both wings of the first floor of the Luxembourg Palace. The first series of 21 canvases depicts the life of Marie in largely allegorical terms, and was finished by the end of 1624, to coincide with the celebrations surrounding the wedding of her daughter, Henrietta Maria to Charles I of England on 11 May 1625. The cycle of paintings dedicated to the life of Henry IV was never completed, although some preliminary sketches survive. (See #Henry IV Cycle below). The fact that the Henry IV series was not realized can be attributed in part to Marie de' Medici being permanently banned from France by her son in 1631. She escaped to Brussels, and later died in exile in 1642 in the same house that the Peter Paul Rubens's family had occupied more than fifty years prior.

While this cycle was one of Rubens's first great commissions, Marie de' Medici's life proved a difficult one to portray. Rubens had the task of creating twenty-one paintings about a woman whose life could be measured by her marriage to Henry IV and the births of her six children, one of which died in infancy. At this time, women did not in general receive such laudatory tributes, although Rubens, if anyone, was well equipped for the job, having a great respect for "the virtues of the opposite sex", as seen in his commissions for the Archduchess Isabella. Furthermore, unlike her husband, Marie's life was neither graced with triumphant victories nor punctuated by vanquished foes. Rather, implications of political scandal in her life made any literal depiction of the events far too controversial for Rubens to execute without incurring the disapproval from others in government. Far from failing, Rubens demonstrated his impressive knowledge of classical literature and artistic traditions, by using allegorical representations to both glorify the mundane aspects and sensitively illustrate the less favorable events in Marie's life. During the sixteenth and seventeenth centuries iconography of the Christian world, as well as that of the Greek and Roman pantheon was understood by well-educated artists and citizens alike, and a familiar device used in artistry. Rubens painted extravagant images of the Queen Mother surrounded by ancient gods and at times even deified her using these devices. The ambiguity of the figures was essentially used to depict Marie in a positive light.

Rubens's Medici commission was an inspiration for other artists as well, particularly the French painters Jean-Antoine Watteau (1684–1721) and François Boucher (1703–1770) who produced copies from the Medici cycle.

== Rubens ==
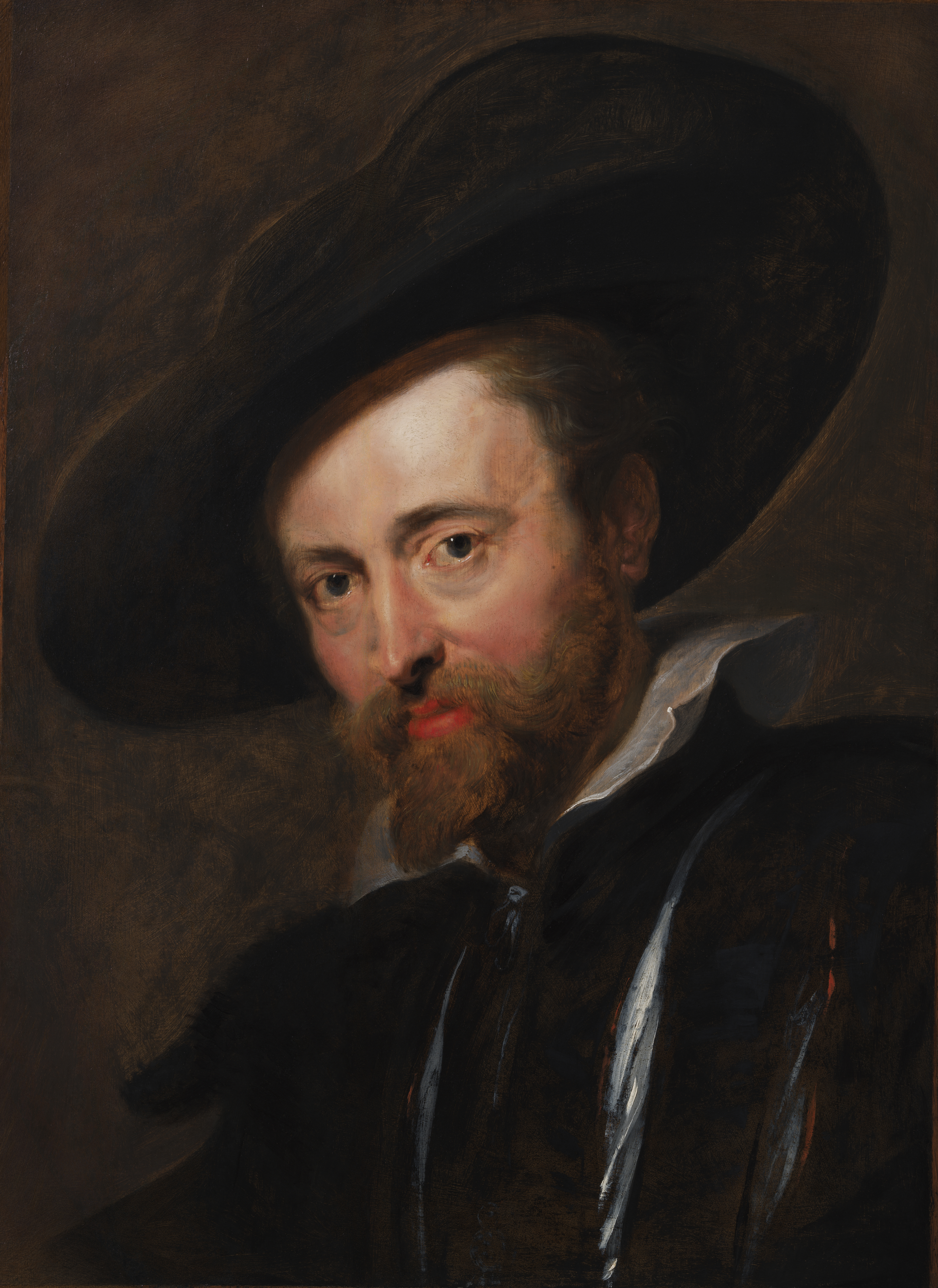
Peter Paul Rubens

Peter Paul Rubens (1577–1640) was a highly influential artist in Northern Europe, widely believed to have played an important role in shaping the style and visual language of his time. The overseer or creator of more than three thousand woodcuts, engravings and paintings in various mediums, Rubens's works include historical, religious and allegorical paintings, altarpieces, portraits and landscapes. He is particularly known for his portrayal of human figures, lush and richly colored fabrics and well-developed themes often derived from both Christian and classical traditions. Rubens's studies of classical, Greek, and Latin texts influenced his career and set him apart from other painters during his time. Early in his career, Rubens studied under Flemish artists such as Otto van Veen, but his most notable influences come from the time he spent in Italy where he studied ancient sculpture and the works of Michelangelo, Raphael, Caravaggio, Titian, and Veronese. It was during his time in Italy that he began to make copies of classical sculpture, such as the Laocoön Group, and collect drawings done by other artists. However, the artist was also an avid collector of both reproductions and original works, not only from the masters of the Italian Renaissance, but more predominantly from his contemporaries. Rubens owned more prints from his contemporary, Adriaen Brouwer, than any other of his Italian influences or his own contemporaries, although it is suggested that Rubens's compassion and concern for Brouwer's career may have been the influential cause for his collection of Brouwer's work. This record of visual history and the influences of his contemporaries, some who became lifelong friends of Rubens, would make an imprint on his art throughout his entire life.

When Rubens was commissioned to paint the Marie de' Medici cycle, he was quite possibly the most famous and skilled artist in Northern Europe, and was especially appreciated for his monumental religious works, commissioned by various councils and churches in the area. However, the Medici commission was welcomed by Rubens as an opportunity to apply his skills within a secular scene. The benefits of Marie de' Medici's commission continued throughout the rest of Rubens's career. Not only did he further establish and publicize his skill, but also the similarities that exist in his later works, such as stylistic components and themes, undeniably reflect the Medici series.

== The paintings ==
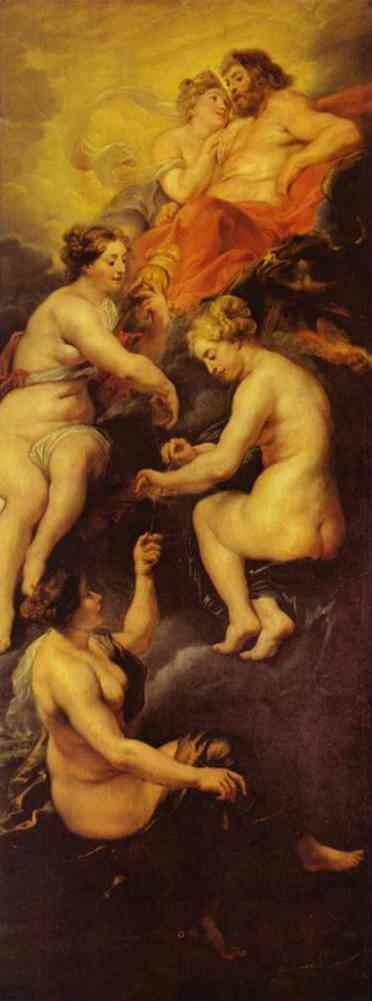
The Destiny of Maria de' Medici

Originally the paintings were hung clockwise in chronological order, decorating the walls of a waiting room expanding from a royal apartment in Marie de' Medici's Luxembourg Palace. The paintings are now displayed in the same order in the Louvre. There is an additional claim that Marie had envisioned these paintings to be studied alternately, left to right, so the thoughtful viewer would have had to crisscross down the gallery. Coolidge also argues that Marie envisioned the subjects as falling into pairs, and further into groups. Therefore, Marie's visual biography was divided into three main chapters: childhood, life as a married queen, and the regency as a widow. All of the paintings have the same height although they vary in width in order to fit the shape of the room they were intended for. The sixteen paintings that covered the long walls of the gallery measure about four meters tall by three meters wide, the three larger paintings at the end of the room are four meters high by seven meters wide.

Originally the viewer would have entered the gallery from the southeast corner. The most visible works from this angle were The Coronation in Saint Denis and The Death of Henry IV and the Proclamation of the Regency. The cycle began at the entrance wall, featuring images of Marie's childhood years and her marriage to Henry IV. Four of the images are devoted to the marriage, possibly because marriage at Marie's relatively advanced age of twenty-seven was quite rare for a woman at the time. This half ends with a depiction of Marie's coronation. The wall opposite the gallery's entrance presents an image of the assassination and assumption of Henry IV, as well as the proclamation of the widowed Marie's regency. From there, the second half of Rubens' cycle begins addressing the more controversial issues from Marie's reign. For example, both the altercation and reconciliation with her son Louis XIII are subjects Marie de' Medici commissioned Rubens to paint for this gallery.

The historical period that encompassed the subject matter for the paintings was a time of political upheaval in which Rubens sought not to offend the reigning French monarch. Rubens thus turned to mythological allusions, emblematic references, personifications of vices and virtues and religious analogies to veil an often unheroic or ambiguous reality. Within this context Rubens' approach to 'historical truth' may appear selective or, worse, dishonest, but he was neither a historian in the modern sense, nor a journalist; the Medici cycle is not reportage, but rather poetic transformation.

As a narrative source for the Marie de' Medici cycle Rubens used an ancient genera of writing in which ideal kingship, and good government were explored. This genera of writing is called the Panegyric. Panegyric writings were usually written during an important political event, the birth of a prince for example, and were used to exalt the qualities and ancestry of a ruler. A formal chronological structure is followed in Panegyric writings detailing the ancestry, birth, education and life of the individual. Rubens followed this structure in his series of paintings about Marie de' Medici.

The price of Marie de' Medici Cycle was roughly 24,000 guilders for the 292 square meters, which calculates to about 82 guilders, or 1,512 dollars, per square meter.

=== The Destiny of Marie de' Medici ===
The first painting of the narrative cycle, The Destiny of Marie de' Medici, is a twisting composition of the three Fates on clouds beneath the celestial figures of Juno and Jupiter.

The Fates are depicted as beautiful, nude goddesses spinning the thread of Marie de' Medici's destiny; their presence at Marie's birth assures her prosperity and success as a ruler that is unveiled in the cycle's subsequent panels. In Greek and Roman mythology, one Fate spun the thread, another measured its length, and the third cut the thread. In Rubens' depiction, however, the scissors necessary for this cutting are omitted, stressing the privileged and immortal character of the Queen's life. The last panel of the cycle, in accordance with this theme, illustrates Queen Marie rising up to her place as queen of heaven, having achieved her lifelong goal of immortality through eternal fame.

Early interpretations explained Juno's presence in the scene through her identity as the goddess of childbirth. Later interpretations suggested, however, that Rubens used Juno to represent Marie de' Medici's alter ego, or avatar, throughout the cycle. Jupiter accordingly signifies the allegory of Henry IV, the promiscuous husband.

=== The Birth of the Princess ===
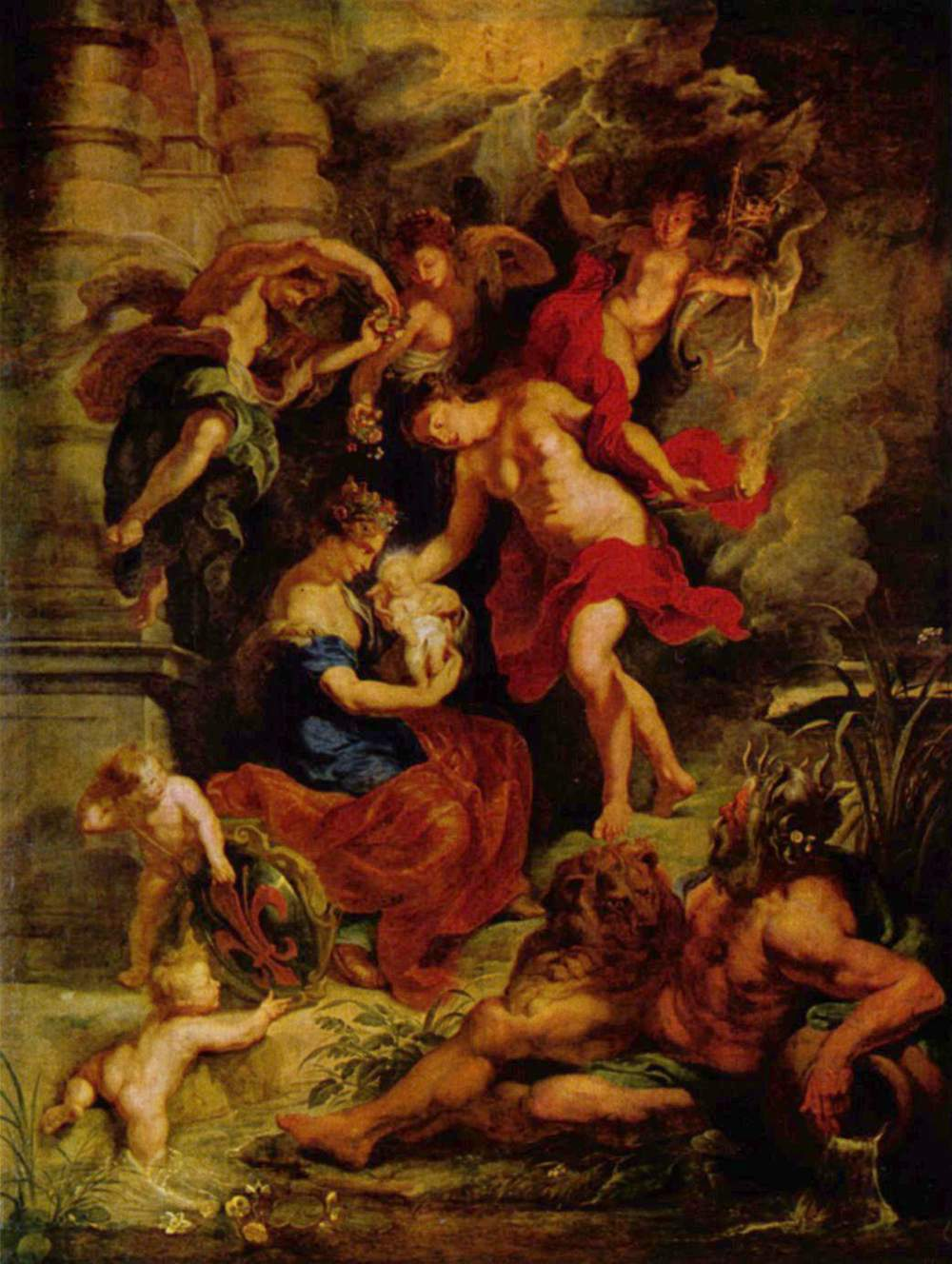
The Birth of the Princess, in Florence on 26 April 1573.

The cycle's second painting, The Birth of the Princess, represents Medici's birth on 26 April 1573. Symbols and allegory appear throughout the painting. On the left, two putti play with a shield on which the Medici crest appears, suggesting that Heaven favored the young Medici from the moment of her birth. The river god in the picture's right corner is likely an allusion to the Arno river that passes through Florence, Marie's city of birth. The cornucopia above the infant's head can be interpreted as a harbinger of Marie's future glory and fortune; the lion may be seen as symbolic of power and strength. The glowing halo around the infant's head should not be seen as a reference to Christian imagery; rather, it should be read according to imperial iconography which uses the halo as an indication of the Queen's divine nature and of her future reign. Though Marie was born under the Taurus sign, Sagittarius appears in the painting; it may be seen as a guardian of imperial power.

=== Education of the Princess ===
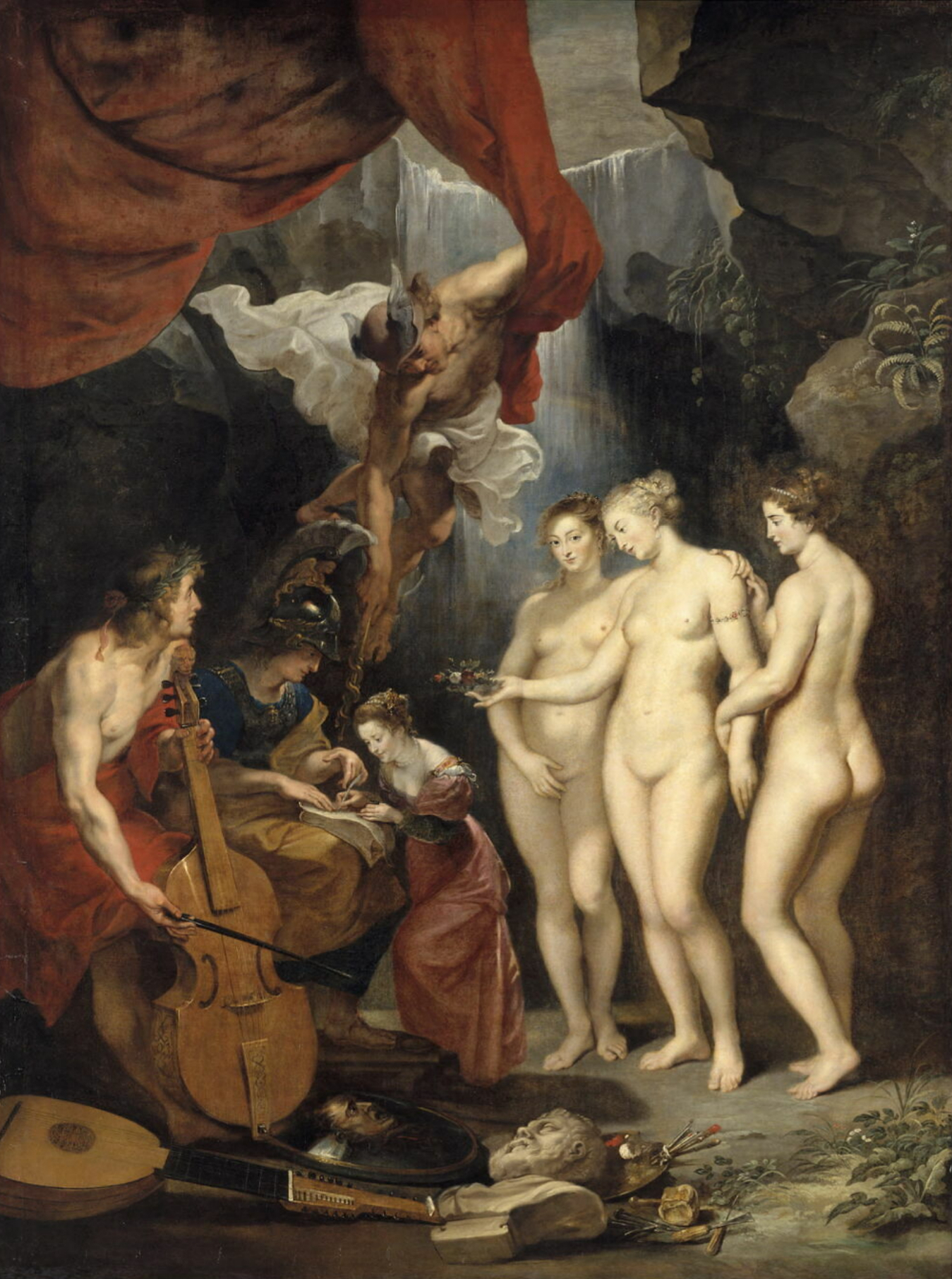
The Education of the Princess

Education of the Princess (1622–1625) shows a maturing Marie de' Medici at study. Her education is given a divine grace by the presence of three gods Apollo, Athena, and Hermes. Apollo being associated with art, Athena with wisdom, and Hermes the messenger god for a fluency and understanding of language. Hermes dramatically rushes in on the scene and literally brings a gift from the gods, the caduceus. It is generally thought that Hermes endows the princess with the gift of eloquence, to go along with the Grace's gift of beauty. However, the caduceus, which is seen in six other paintings in the cycle, has also been associated with peace and harmony. The object may be seen as foretelling of Marie's peaceful reign. It can be interpreted that the combined efforts of these divine teachers represent Marie's idyllic preparedness for the responsibilities she will obtain in the future, and the trials and tribulations she will face as Queen. It is also suggested that the three gods, more importantly, offer their guidance as a gift that allows the soul to be "freed by reason" and gain the knowledge of what is "good" revealing the divine connection between the gods and the future Queen. The painting displays an embellished Baroque collaboration of the spiritual and earthly relationships, which are illustrated in a theatrical environment. Acting as more than just static symbols the figures portrayed take an active role in her education. Also present are the three graces, Euphrosyne, Aglaea, and Thalia giving her beauty.

=== The Presentation of Her Portrait to Henry IV ===
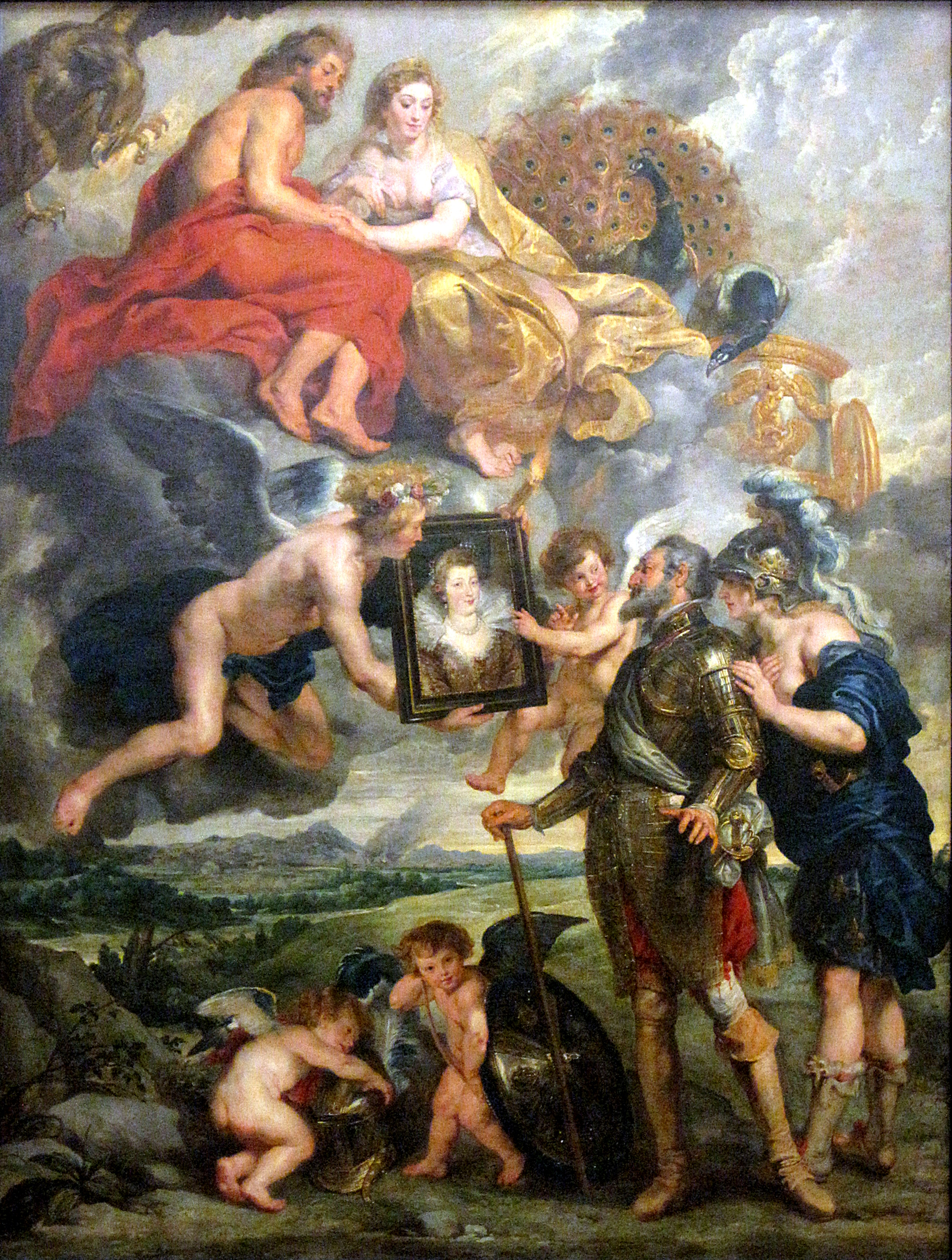
The Presentation of Her Portrait to Henry IV

To fully appreciate and value this particular cycle piece and the collection as a whole, there is one historical principle to take into account. This painting was created on the cusp of the age of absolutism and, as such, one must remember royalty were considered above corporeal existence. So from birth, Marie would have led a life more ornamental than mortal. This painting of classical gods, along with allegorical personifications, aptly shows the viewer how fundamental this idea was.

Just as Tamino in The Magic Flute, Henry IV falls in love with a painted image. With Amor the Cupid as his escort, Hymenaios, the god of marriage, displays the princess Marie on canvas to her future king and husband. Meanwhile, Jupiter and Juno are sitting atop clouds looking down on Henry as they provide the viewer a key example of marital harmony and thus show approval for the marriage. A personification of France is shown behind Henry in her helmet, her left hand showing support, sharing in his admiration of the future sovereignty. Rubens had a way of depicting France that was very versatile in gender in many of his paintings in the cycle. Here France takes on an androgynous role being both woman and man at the same time. Frances's intimate gesture may suggest a closeness between Henry and his country. This gesture would usually be shared among male companions, telling each other's secret. The way France is also dressed shows how female she is on top revealing her breasts and the way the fabric is draped adding notions of classicism. However her bottom half, most notably her exposed calves and Roman boots hints at a masculinity. A sign of male strength in the history of imagery was their stance and exposed strong legs. This connection between the two shows that not only are the gods in favor of the match, but the King also has the well wishes of his people.

In negotiating the marriage between Marie de' Medici and Henry IV, a number of portraits were exchanged between the two. The king was pleased with her looks, and upon meeting her was impressed even more by her, than with her portraits. There was great approval of the match, as Pope Clement VIII and many powerful Florentine nobles had been advocates of the marriage and had worked at convincing the king of the benefits of such a union. The couple were married by proxy on 5 October 1600.

Rubens is able to coalesce these characters together into a single united front. He creates equality between all of the figures in the painting by cleverly balancing corporeal and ethereal space.

=== The Wedding by Proxy of Marie de' Medici to King Henry IV ===
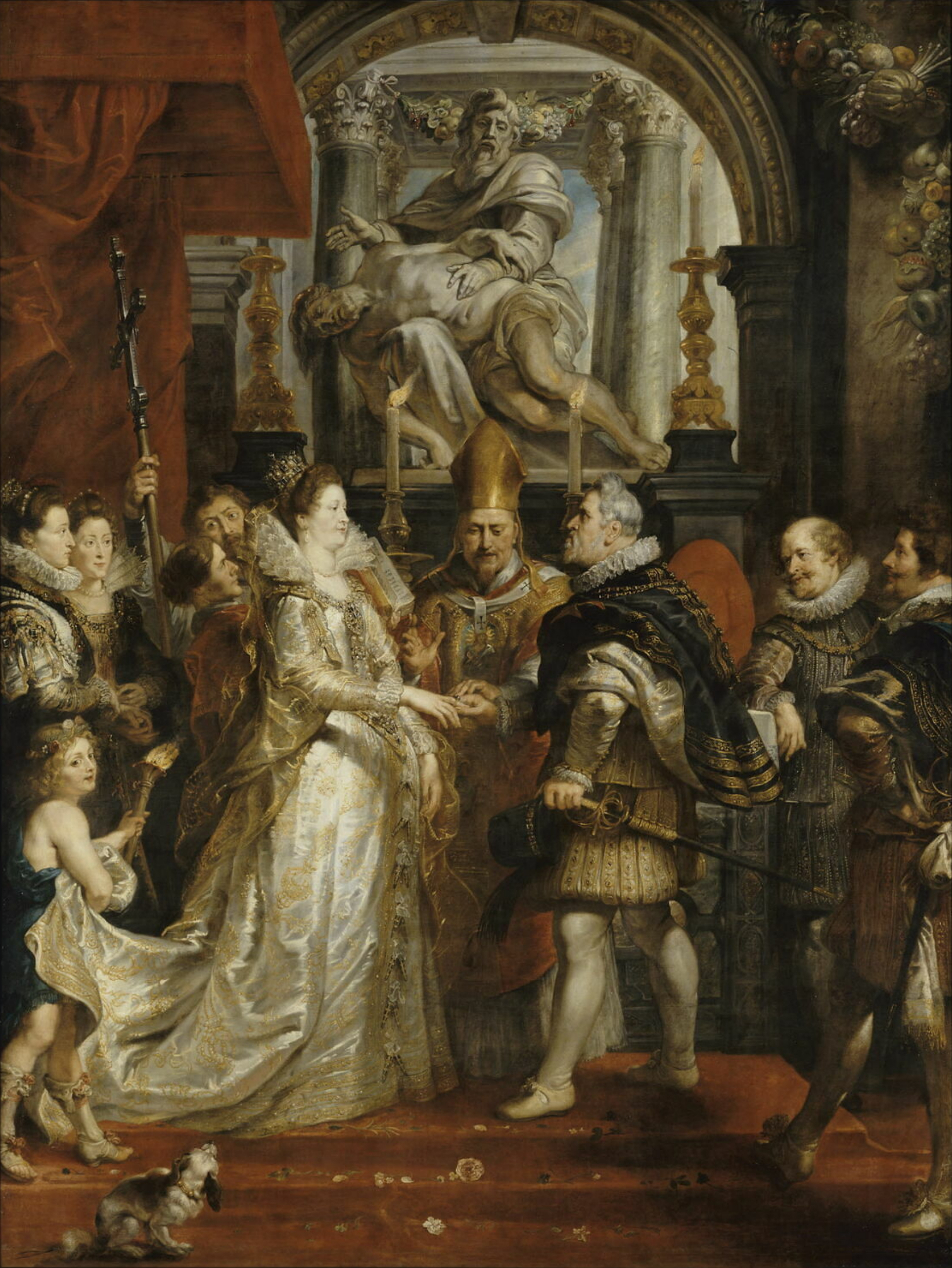
The Wedding by Proxy of Marie de' Medici to King Henry IV

The Wedding by Proxy of Marie de' Medici to King Henry IV (1622–25), Rubens depicts the proxy marriage ceremony of the Florentine princess Marie de' Medici to the King of France, Henry IV which took place in Florence Cathedral on 5 October 1600. Cardinal Pietro Aldobrandini presides over the ritual. As was often the case with royal weddings, the bride's uncle, Ferdinando I de' Medici, Grand Duke of Tuscany stood in the King's place and is pictured here slipping a ring on his niece's finger. All the surrounding figures are identifiable, including the artist himself. Although he was present at the actual event twenty years earlier, as a member of the Gonzaga household during his travels in Italy, Rubens appears youthful and stands behind the bride, holding a cross and gazing out at the viewer. It is highly unlikely that Rubens actually had such a pronounced presence in this scene when it took place. Those who attended the ceremony for Marie include Grand Duchess Cristina of Tuscany and Marie's sister Eleonora de' Medici, Duchess of Mantua; and in entourage of Grand Duke are Roger de Bellegarde, and the Marquis de Sillery, who negotiated the marriage. As in other scenes in the Medici Cycle, Rubens includes a mythological element: the ancient god of marriage, Hymenaios wearing a crown of roses, carries the bride's train in one hand and the nuptial torch in the other. The scene takes place below a marble statue, which depicts God the Father mourning over the dead body of Christ, alluding to the Pieta sculpture by Baccio Bandinelli (1493–1560).

=== The Disembarkation at Marseilles ===
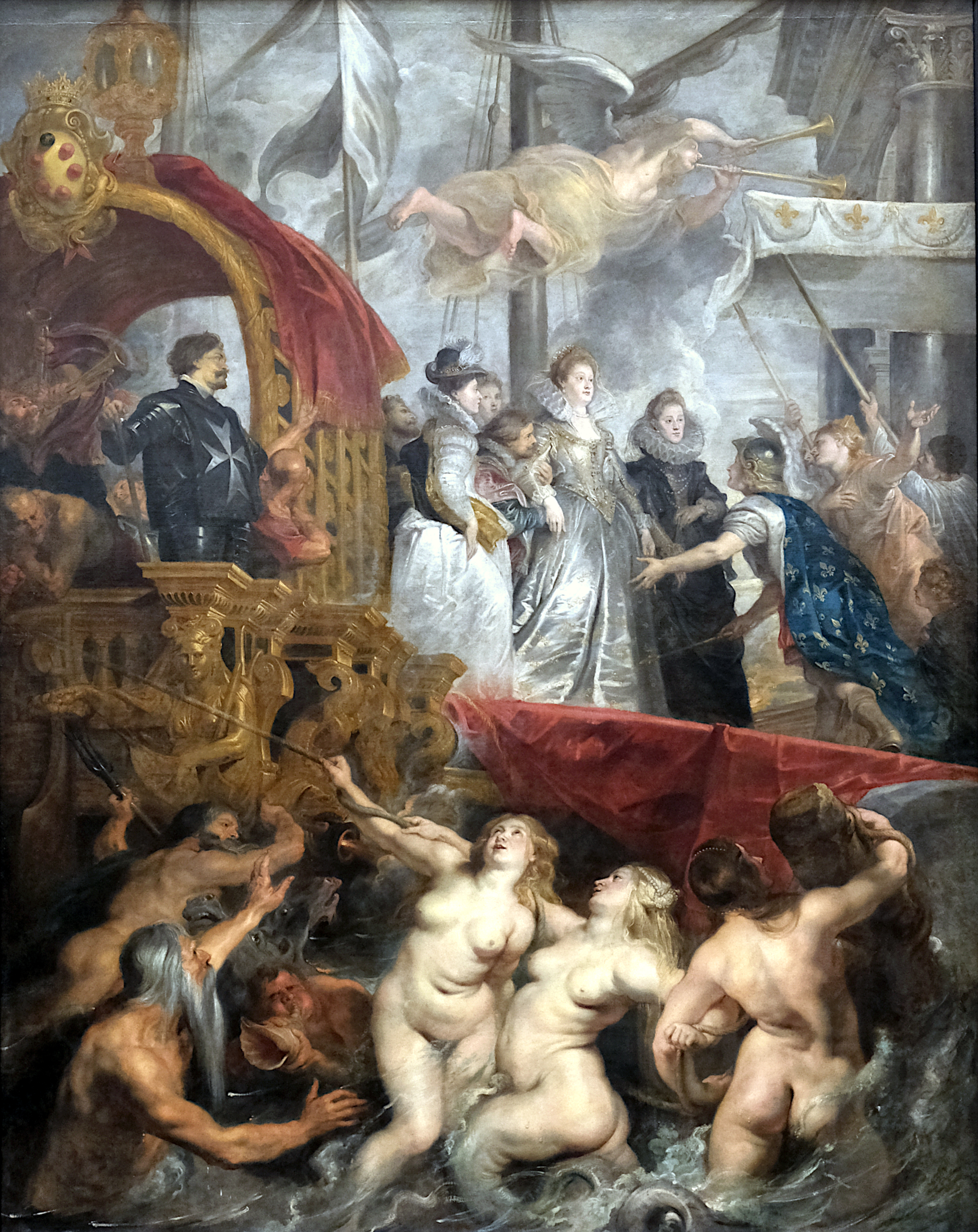
The Disembarkation at Marseilles

Having never been a particularly graceful event for anyone, disembarking a ship does not pose a problem for Rubens in his depiction of Marie de' Medici arriving in Marseilles after having been married to Henry IV by proxy in Florence. Rubens has again, turned something ordinary into something of unprecedented magnificence. He depicts her leaving the ship down a gangplank (she actually walked up, not down, but was illustrated this way by Rubens to create a diagonal element). She was accompanied by the Grand Duchess of Tuscany and her sister, the Duchess of Mantua, into the welcoming, allegorical open arms of a personified France, wearing a helmet and the royal blue mantle with the golden fleur-de-lis. Her sister and aunt flank Marie while two trumpets are blown simultaneously by an ethereal Fame, announcing her arrival to the people of France. Below, Poseidon, three Nereids, a sea-god and Triton rise from the sea, after having escorted the future Queen on the long voyage to procure her safe arrival in Marseilles. To the left, the arms of the Medici can be seen above an arched structure, where a Knight of Malta stands in all of his regalia. It is melody and song as Rubens combines heaven and Earth, history and allegory into a symphony for the eyes of the viewer. On a side note, Avermaete discusses an interesting idea that is particularly present in this canvas.

He [Rubens] surrounded her [Marie de' Medici] with such a wealth of appurtenances that at every moment she was very nearly pushed into the background. Consider, for example, the Disembarkation at Marseilles, where everyone has eyes only for the voluptuous Naiads, to the disadvantage of the queen who is being received with open arms by France"

=== The Meeting of Marie de' Medici and Henry IV at Lyons ===
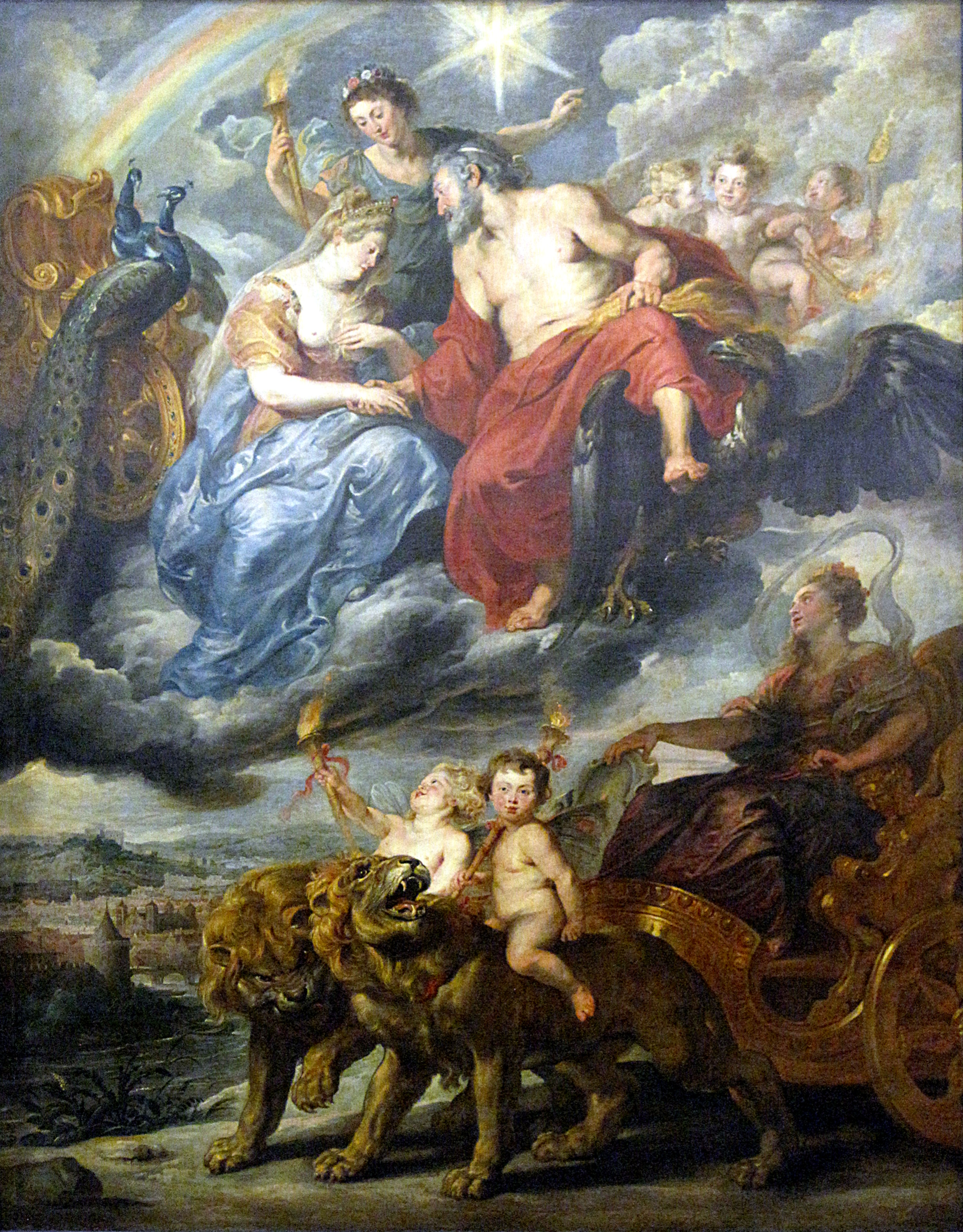
The Meeting of Marie de' Medici and Henry IV at Lyons

This painting allegorically depicts the first meeting of Marie and Henry, which took place after their nuptials by proxy. The upper half of the painting shows Marie and Henry as the mythological Roman gods Juno and Jupiter. The representations are accompanied by their traditional attributes. Marie is shown as Juno (Greek Hera) identified by the peacocks and chariot. Henry is shown as Jupiter (Greek Zeus) identified by the fiery thunderbolts in his hand and the eagle. The joining of the couple's right hands is a traditional symbol of the marriage union. They are dressed in the classical style, which is naturally appropriate to the scene. Above the two stands Hymenaios who unites them. A rainbow extends from the left corner, a symbol of concord and peace. The lower half of the painting is dominated by imagery of Lyons. Reading from left to right, we see the cityscape with its single hill. The lions pull the chariot (which is a pun on the name of the city), and in the chariot we see the allegorical figure of the city herself with a crown of her battlements: Lyons. Rubens needed to be very careful in the representation of the couple's first meeting because allegedly Henry was very much involved with a mistress at the time of the marriage. In fact, due to the king's other engagements their introduction was delayed, and it was not until midnight nearly a week after Marie arrived that Henry finally joined his bride. By presenting him as Jupiter Rubens implies the promiscuity of the man and the deity. Simultaneously by placing King and Queen together he effectively illustrates the elevated status of the couple.

=== The Birth of the Dauphin at Fontainebleau ===
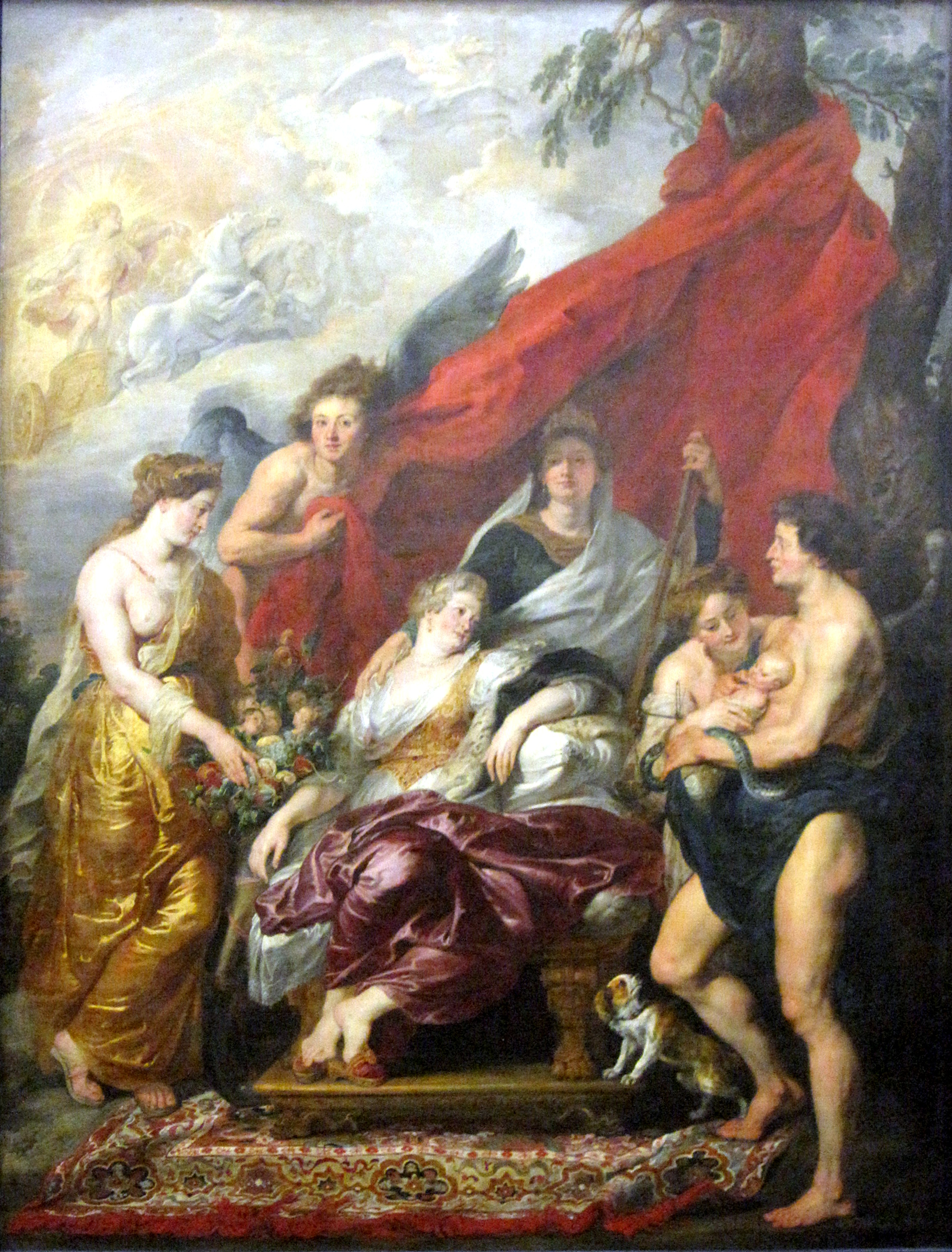
The Birth of the Dauphin at Fontainebleau

This painting depicts the birth of Marie de' Medici's first son, Louis XIII. Rubens designed the scene around the theme of political peace. The birth of the first male heir brings a sense of security to the royal family that they will continue to rule. In those times an heir was of the utmost importance, especially if Henry wanted to showcase his masculinity and discontinue with the pattern of the royal reproductive failure. The word dauphin is French for dolphin, a term associated with princely royalty. Henry's promiscuity made difficult the production of a legitimate heir, and rumors circulated to the extent that Henry's court artists began to employ strategies to convince the country otherwise. One of these strategies was to personify Marie as Juno or Minerva. By representing Marie as Juno, implying Henry as Jupiter, the king is seen domesticated by marriage. The queen's personification as Minerva would facilitate Henry's military prowess and her own. As a Flemish painter Rubens includes a dog in the painting, alluding to fidelity in marriage. In addition to the idea of political peace Rubens also includes the personification of Justice, Astraea. The return of Astraea to earth is symbolic of the embodiment of continuing Justice with the birth of the future king. Louis is nursed by Themis, the goddess of divine order, referring to Louis XIII's birthright to one day become king. The baby is quite close to a serpent, which is a representation of Health. Rubens incorporates the traditional allegory of the cornucopia, which symbolizes abundance, to enhance the meaning of the painting by including the heads of Marie de' Medici's children who have yet to be born among the fruit. While Marie gazes adoringly at her son, Fecundity presses the cornucopia to her arm, representing the complete and bountiful family to come.

=== The Consignment of the Regency ===
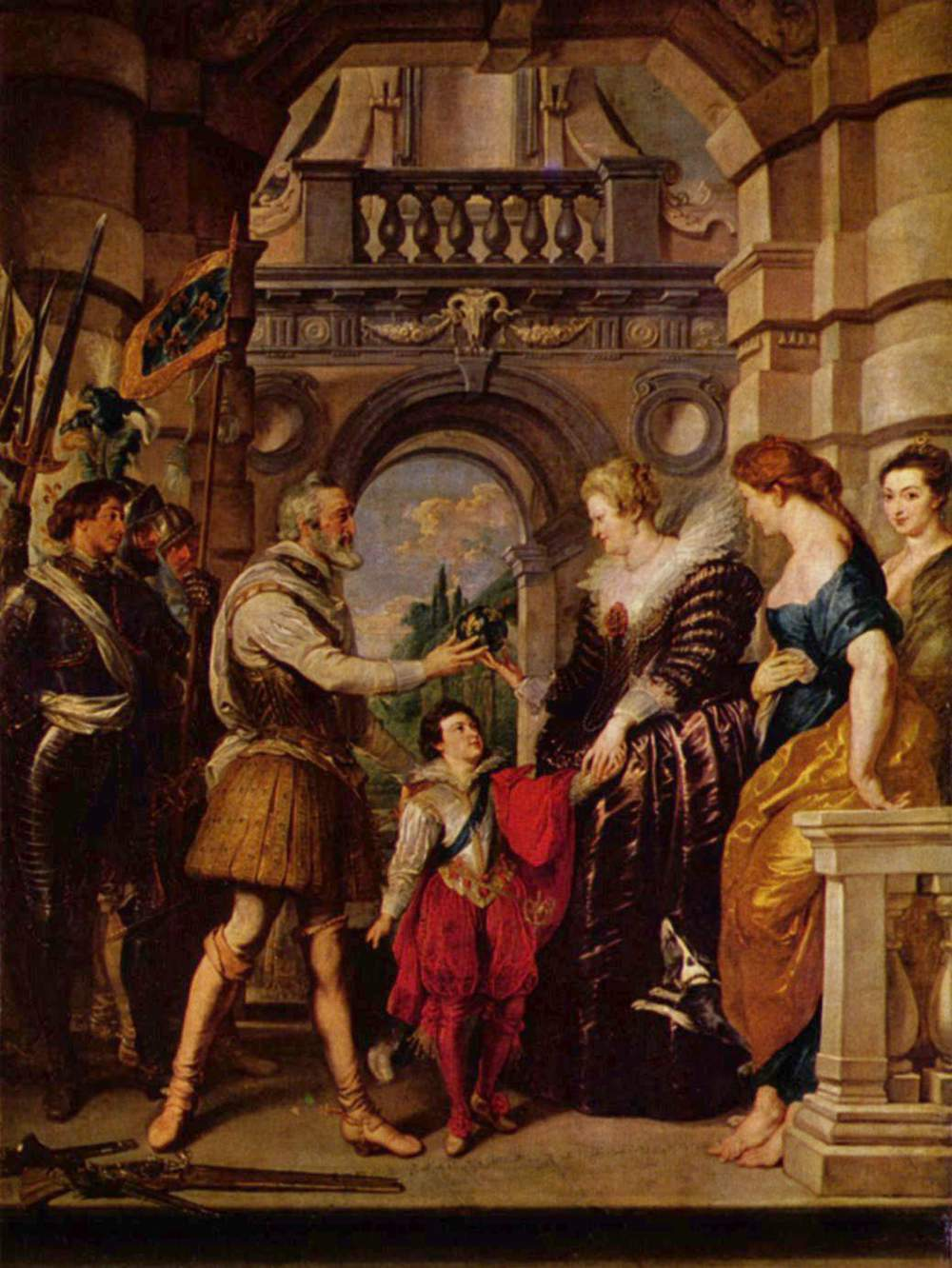
The Consignment of the Regency

Throughout the depictions of Marie de' Medici's life, Rubens had to be careful not to offend either Marie or the king, Louis XIII, when portraying controversial events. Marie commissioned paintings that truthfully followed the events of her life, and it was the job of Rubens to tactfully convey these images. More than once, the artistic license of the painter was curbed in order to portray Marie in the right light. In The Consignment of the Regency, Henry IV entrusts Marie with both the regency of France and the care of the dauphin shortly before his war campaigns and eventual death. Set within a grand Italian-style architectural setting, the theme is somewhat sobering. Prudence, the figure to the right of Marie, was stripped of her emblematic snake to lessen the chances any viewer would be reminded of Marie's rumored involvement in the King's assassination. The efficacy of the form is lost in order to ensure Marie's representation in a positive light. Other changes include the removal of the Three Fates, originally positioned behind the king calling him to his destiny, war, and death. Rubens was forced to remove these mythical figures and replace them with three generic soldiers.

Also worthy of note in this painting is the first appearance of the orb as a symbol of the "all-embracing rule or power of the state". This particular image appears to carry significant weight in Rubens's iconographic program for the cycle, as it appears in six (one quarter) of the twenty-four paintings of the cycle. This orb functions both as an allusion to the Roman orbis terrarum (sphere of earth) which signifies the domain and power of the Roman emperor, and as a subtle assertion of the claim of the French monarchy upon the imperial crown. While Rubens was certainly aware of the inherent meaning of the orb and employed it to great effect, it appears that Marie and her counselors instigated its introduction into the cycle to add allegorical and political grandeur to the events surrounding Marie's regency.

=== The Coronation in Saint-Denis ===
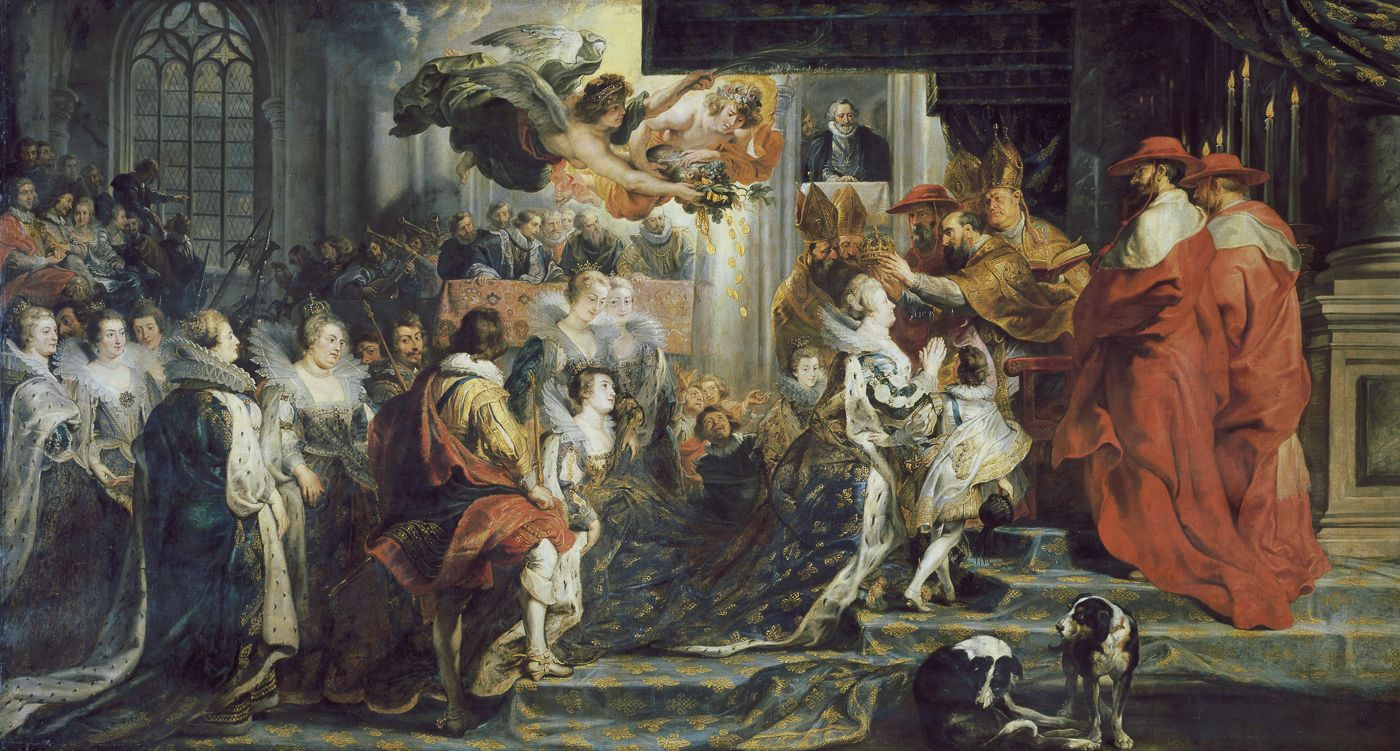
The Coronation in Saint-Denis

The Coronation in Saint-Denis is the last scene on the North End of the West Wall, showing the completion of Marie's divinely assisted preparation. It would be one of two paintings most visually apparent upon entrance into the gallery through the southeast corner. Rubens composes The Coronation in Saint-Denis for distanced viewing by employing accents of red. For example, the robes of two cardinals near the right edge. These accents also create a sense of unity with the neighboring work, The Death of Henry IV and the Proclamation of the Regency.

This painting is a representation of a historical event in the life of the Queen where the King and the Queen were crowned at the basilica of Saint-Denis in Paris. Considered one of the principal paintings in the series along with The Death of Henry IV and the Proclamation of the Regency both scenes also show Marie de' Medici receiving the orb of state. She is conducted to the altar by the Cardinals Gondi and de Sourdis, who stand with her along with Mesieurs de Souvrt and de Bethune. The ceremony is officiated by Cardinal Joyeuse. The royal entourage includes the Dauphin, the Prince of Conti with the crown, the Duke of Ventadour with the scepter, and the Chevalier de Vendôme with the hand of Justice. The Princess of Conti and the Duchess of Montpensier (mother of her future daughter in law) carry the train of the royal mantle. Above in the tribune appears Henry IV, as if to give sanction to the event. The crowd below in the basilica raise their hands in acclamation of the new Queen, and above, the classical personifications of Abundantia and a winged Victoria shower the blessings of peace and prosperity upon the head of Marie by pouring the golden coins of Jupiter. Also, her pet dogs are placed in the foreground of the painting. Rubens inspiration for the blue coronation orb emblazoned with golden lilies was Guillaume Dupres’ presentation medal struck in 1610 at Marie's’ request portraying her as Minerva with Louis XIII as Apollo-Sol . The symbolism carried the message that she was charged with the guidance of the young, soon-to-be king.

=== The Death of Henry IV and the Proclamation of the Regency ===
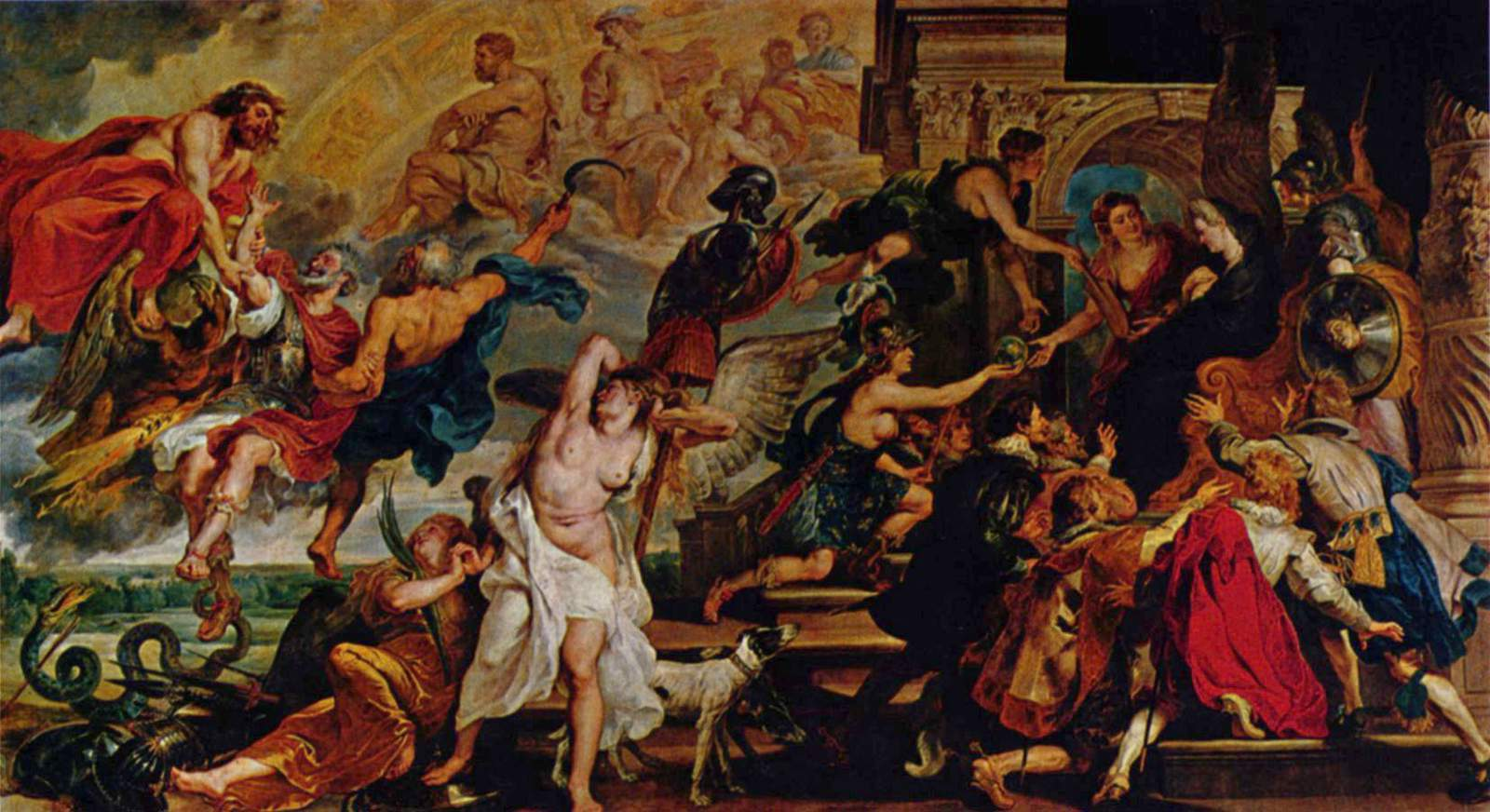
The Death of Henry IV and the Proclamation of the Regency

Sometimes also referred to as The Apotheosis of Henry IV and The Proclamation of the Regency, this particular painting within the Medici Cycle as a whole, was placed originally by Rubens as a series of three. The other two having similar design measurements, it was consigned as the middle painting in a pseudo triptych of sorts as it adorned the halls of Marie de' Medici's Palais du Luxembourg.

The painting is separated into two distinct, but related scenes: the elevation of Henry IV to the heavens (his assassination on 14 May 1610 resulted in the immediate declaration of Marie as regent) and the assumption of Marie to the crown.

On the left, Jupiter and Saturn are shown welcoming the assassinated King of France, as he ascends as a personified Roman sovereign, victoriously to Olympus. As with all of Ruben's allegorical paintings, these two figures are chosen for a reason. Jupiter is meant to be the King's celestial counterpart, while Saturn, who represents finite time, is an indication of the end of Henry's mortal existence. This particular theme, within the painting as a whole, has found other great masters receiving inspiration and fascination from Rubens' tormented figure of Bellona, the goddess of War, who lays disarmed below. Post-Impressionist, Paul Cézanne (1839–1906) registered for permission to copy the goddess as many as ten times. It should be kept in mind that Rubens' energetic manner of placing all these allegorical themes is substantially resultant from classical coins as documented through communication with his friend and notable collector of antiquities, Nicolas-Claude Fabri de Peiresc. The right side of the panel shows the succession of the new Queen, dressed in solemn clothing suited to a widow. She is framed by a triumphal arch and surrounded by people at the court. The Queen accepts an orb, a symbol of government, from the personification of France while the people kneel before her and this scene is a great example of the exaggeration of facts in the cycle. Rubens stresses the idea of the Regency that was offered to the Queen, though she actually claimed it for herself the same day her husband was murdered.

Worthy of note is a possible contemporary inspirational influence on Rubens for the right side of this painting. Although originally started but may or may not have been finished in Rome, Caravaggio's Madonna of the Rosary may well have been an artistic influence on Rubens for the Proclamation of the Regency side of this painting, as the two works are highly corresponding in their presentation. Through a causal nexus, this painting would have been available to Rubens and thereby plausible for its influence to exist within Rubens's own genius on canvas. As a comparison, there are within each, two women upon a dais classical pillars, swathes of luxuriant cloth, genuflecting personages with arms extended, and allegorical figures present. In Rubens's painting, Minerva, Prudence, Divine Providence and France; in the Caravaggio, St Dominic, St Peter the Martyr, and a pair of Dominican friars. Also present in each are objets importants: rudder, globe, and rosaries. All these and more, combine to make a persuasive argument and show a certain artistically respectful nod from Rubens to Caravaggio as two contemporaries of the time.

=== The Council of the Gods ===
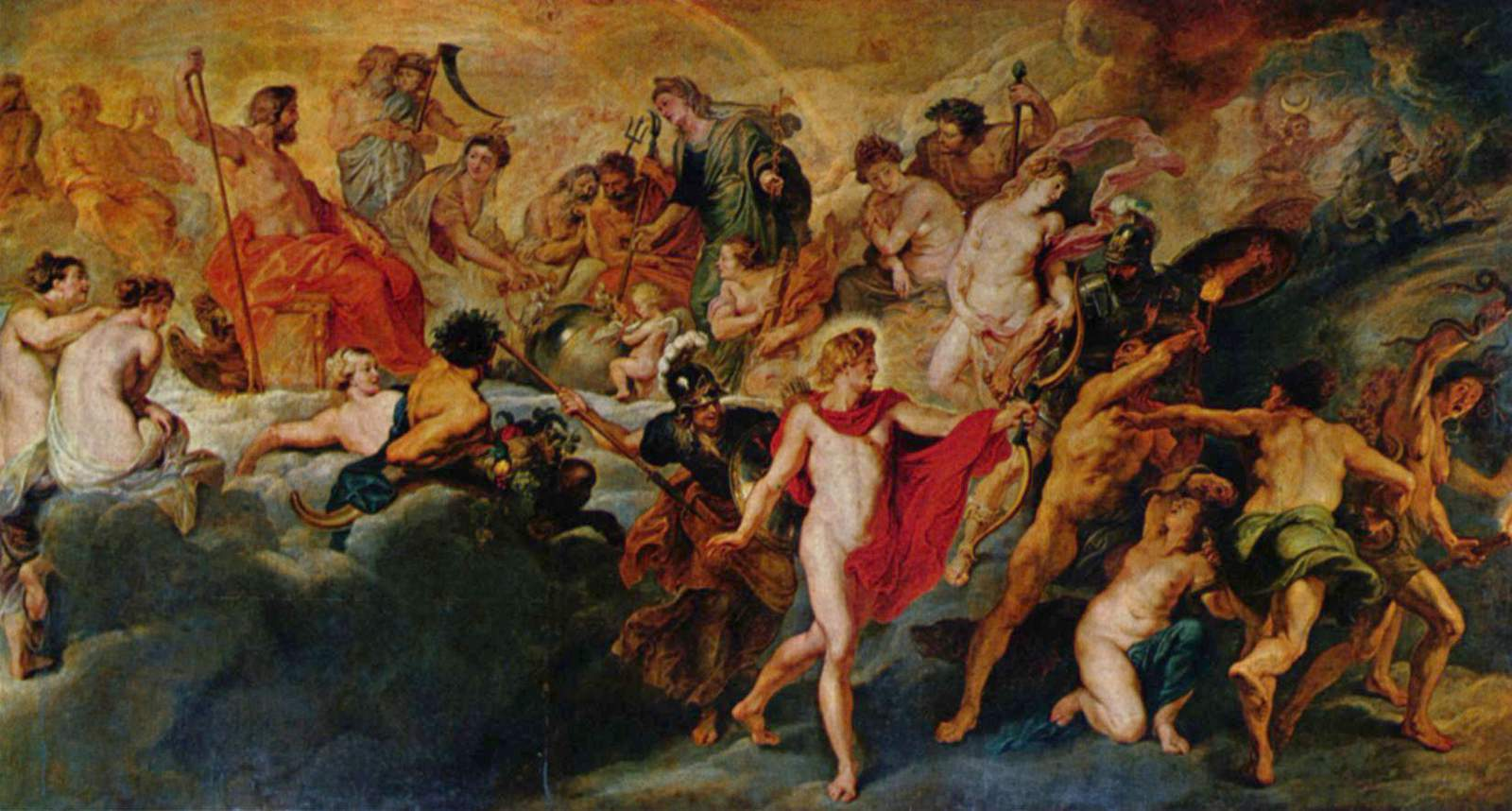
The Council of the Gods

This painting commemorates Marie taking over the government as new regent, and promoting long-term plans for peace in Europe by way of marriages between royal houses.

Cupid and Juno bind two doves together over a split sphere in the painting as a symbol of peace and love. Marie hoped for her son, Louis XIII, to marry the Spanish Infanta Anne of Austria and for her daughter Elizabeth to marry the future king of Spain, Philip IV, possibly resulting in an alliance between France and Spain. To Marie de' Medici these unions were probably the most significant part of her reign, for peace in Europe was Marie's greatest goal.

The Council of the Gods is one of the least understood paintings of Marie de' Medici cycle. It represents the conduct of the Queen and the great care with which she oversees her Kingdom during her Regency. For example, how she overcomes the rebellions and the disorders of the State. It also suggests that she perpetuated the policies and ideals of the late King in his life and in death. The painting subjects are placed in a celestial setting which doesn't give way to a particular place, time or event. The scene is painted with a variety of mythological figures. This, along with its setting makes it difficult to figure out the subject matter of the work. The mythological figures include Apollo and Pallas, who combat and overcome vices such as Discord, Hate, Fury, and Envy on the ground and Neptune, Pluto, Saturn, Hermes, Pan, Flora, Hebe, Pomono, Venus, Mars, Zeus, Hera, Cupid, and Diana above. The mythological figures and celestial setting act as allegories for Marie's peaceful rule over France.

=== The Regent Militant: The Victory at Jülich ===
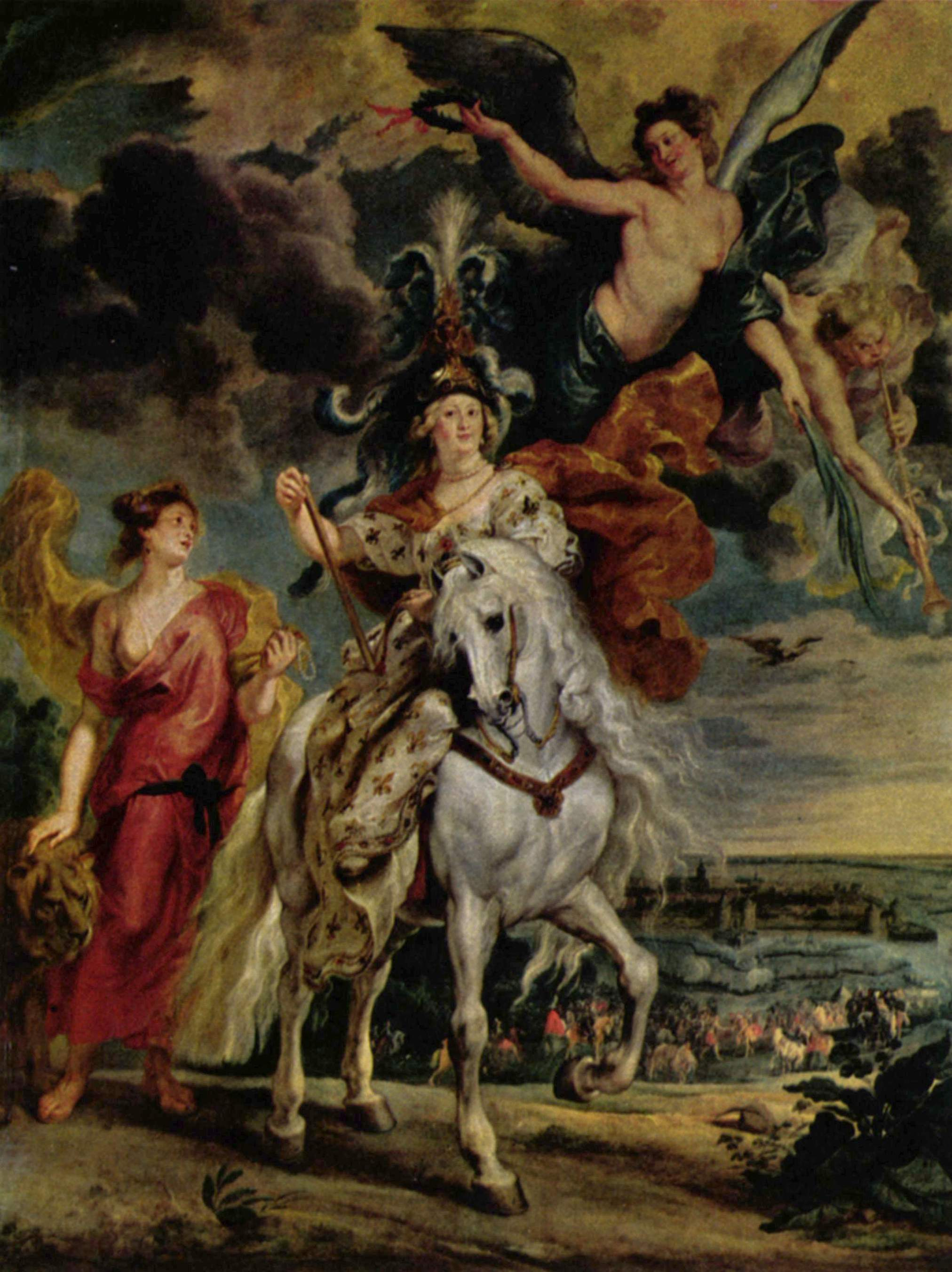
The Victory at Jülich.

The Victory at Jülich shows the only military event that the Queen participated in during her regency: the return of Jülich (or Juliers in French) to the Protestant princes. Being a crossing of the Rur, Juliers was of great strategic importance for France and thus the French victory was chosen to be the glorious subject of Rubens' painting. The scene is rich with symbolism highlighting her heroism and victory. The Queen thrusts her arm high with an assembler's baton in hand. In the upper part of the image Victoria appears crowning her with laurel leaves which is a symbol of victory. Also symbolizing victory is the imperial eagle which can be seen in the distance. The eagle in the sky compels the weaker birds to flee. The Queen is accompanied by a womanly embodiment of what was once thought to be Fortitude because of the lion beside her. However, the figure is Magnanimity, also referred to as Generosity, because of the riches held in her palm. One of the pieces in her hand is the Queen's treasured strand of pearls. Other figures include Fame and the personification of Austria with her lion. Fame in the right side of the painting pushes air through the trumpet so powerfully that a burst of smoke comes out. In the painting Marie de' Medici is highly decorated and triumphant after the collapse of a city, she is depicted across a white stallion to demonstrate that, like the departed King Henry IV, she could triumph over rivals in warfare.

=== The Exchange of the Princesses at the Spanish Border ===
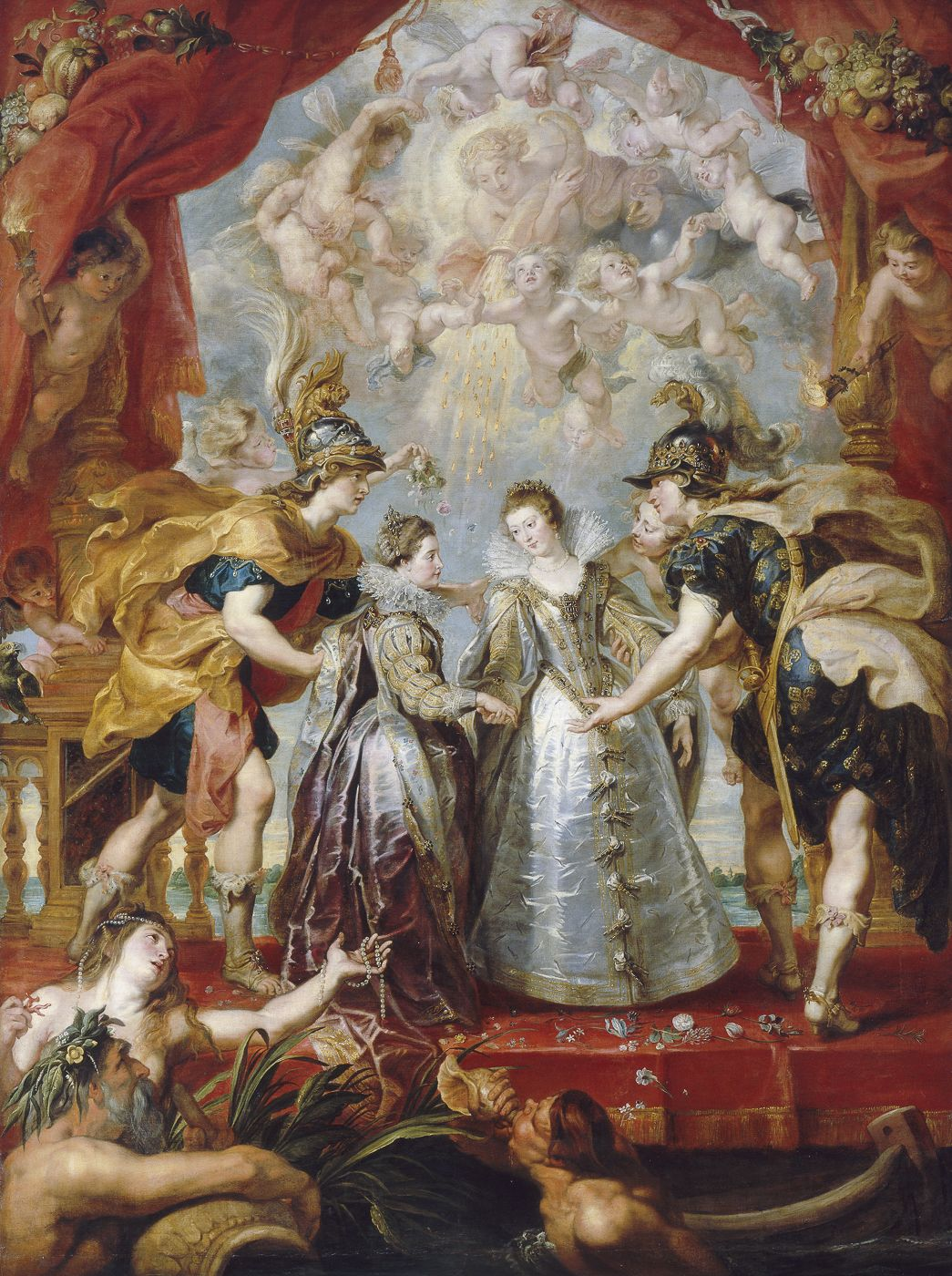
The Exchange of Princesses

The Exchange of Princesses celebrates the double marriage of the Anne of Austria to Louis XIII and Louis XIII's sister, Princess Elisabeth, to future king of Spain, Philip IV on 9 November 1615. France and Spain present the young princesses, aided by a youth who is probably Hymenaios. Above them, two putti brandish hymeneal torches, a small zephyr blows a warm breeze of spring and scatter roses, and a circle of joyous butterfly-winged putti surround Felicitas Publica with the caduceus, who showers the couple with gold from her cornucopia. Below, the river Andaye is filled with sea deities come to pay homage to the brides: the river-god Andaye rests on his urn, a nereid crowned with pearls offers a strand of pearls and coral as wedding gifts, while a triton blows the conch to herald the event. The wedding, which was thought to secure peace between France and Spain, took place on a float midway across the Bidasoa river, along the French-Spanish border. In Rubens' depiction, the princesses stand with their right hands joined between personifications of France and Spain. Spain with a recognizable symbol of a lion on her helmet is on the left, whereas France, with fleur-de-lis decorating her drapery, is on the right. Anne, at age fourteen the older of the two, turns back as if to take leave of Spain, while France gently pulls her by the left arm. In turn, Spain can be seen taking the thirteen-year-old Elisabeth by her left arm.

=== The Felicity of the Regency of Marie de' Medici ===
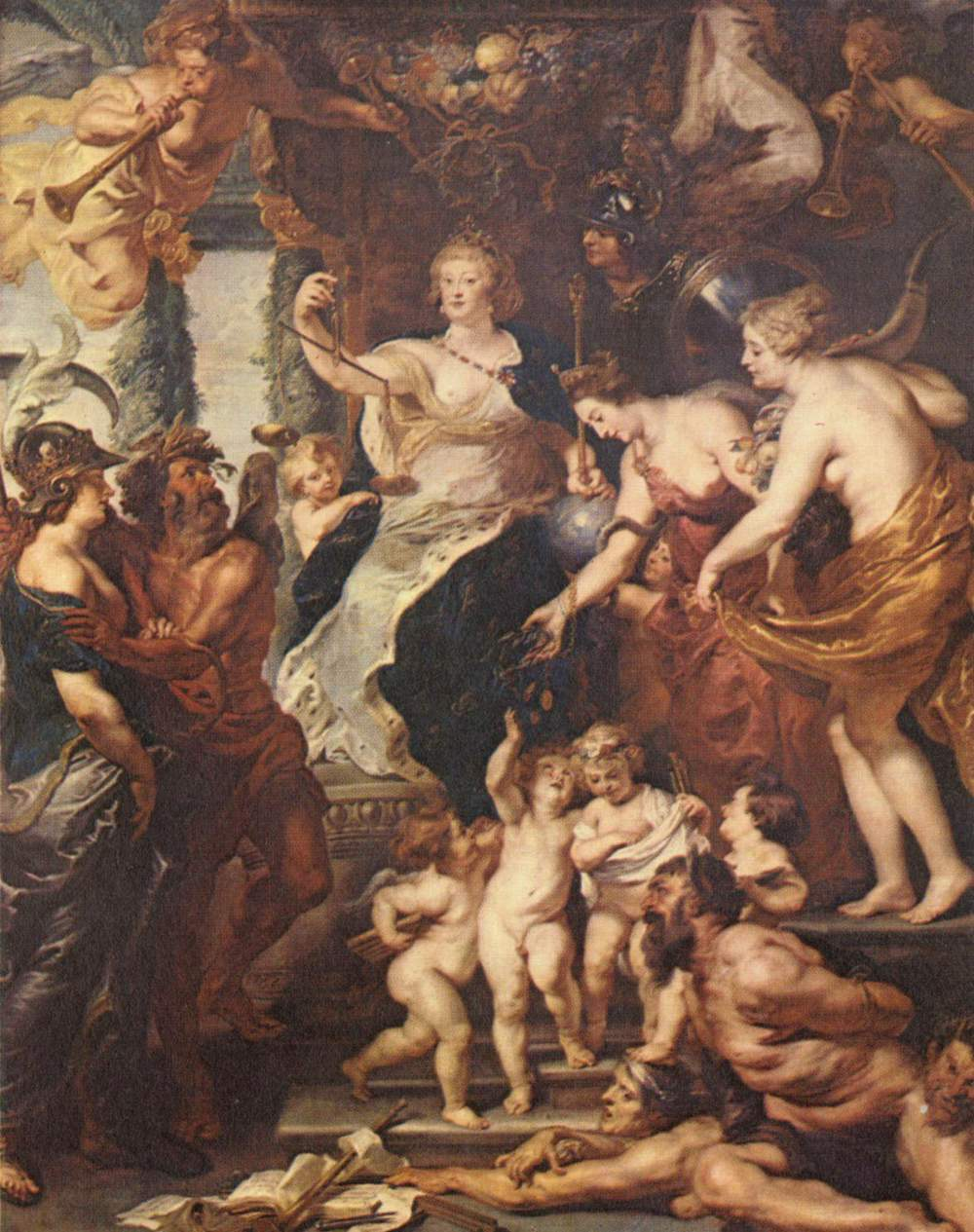
The Felicity of the Regency of Marie de' Medici

This particular painting in the Marie de' Medici Cycle is noteworthy for its uniqueness in execution. While the other paintings were completed at Rubens's studio in Antwerp, The Felicity of the Regency of Marie de' Medici was designed and painted entirely by Rubens on the spot to replace another, far more controversial depiction of Marie's 1617 expulsion from Paris by her son Louis. Completed in 1625, this is the final painting in the cycle in terms of chronological order of completion.

Here Marie is shown in allegorical fashion as the personification of Justice itself and flanked by a retinue of some of the primary personifications/gods in the Greek and Roman pantheon. These have been identified as Cupid, Minerva, Prudence, Abundance, Saturn, and two figures of Pheme, all indicated by their traditional attributes, all bestowing their bounties on the Queen. (Cupid has his arrow; Prudence carries a snake entwined around her arm to indicate serpent-like wisdom; Abundance also appears with her cornucopia, also a reference to the fruits of Marie's regency. Minerva, goddess of wisdom, bears her helmet and shield and stands near Marie's shoulder, signifying her wise rule. Saturn has his sickle and is personified as Time here guiding France forward. Fame carries a trumpet to herald the occasion.) These personifications are accompanied in turn by several allegorical figures in the guise of four putti and three vanquished evil creatures (Envy, Ignorance, and Vice) as well as a number of other symbols that Rubens employed throughout the entire cycle of paintings.

Though this particular painting is one of the most straightforward in the series, there is still some minor dispute about its significance. Rather than accept this as a depiction of Marie as Justice, some hold that the real subject of the painting is the "return to earth of Astraea, the principle of divine justice, in a golden age." They support this claim with a statement in Rubens's notes which indicates that "this theme holds no special reference to the particular reason of state of the French kingdom." Certain symbolic elements, such as the wreath of oak leaves (a possible corona civica), France being seen as a subjugated province, and the inclusion of Saturn in the scheme might all point to this interpretation and certainly would not have been lost on Rubens. Fortunately, and perhaps solely due to the controversy surrounding this painting, Rubens mentioned its significance in a letter to Peiresc dated 13 May 1625. It reads,

I believe I wrote you that a picture was removed which depicted the Queen's departure from Paris and that, in its place, I did an entirely new one which shows the flowing of the Kingdom of France, with the revival of the sciences and the arts through the liberality and the splendour of Her Majesty, who sits upon a shining throne and holds a scale in her hands, keeping the world in equilibrium by her prudence and equity.

Considering the haste with which Rubens completed this painting, his lack of specific reference to a golden age in his letter, and the existence of several contemporary depictions of Marie as a figure of Justice, most historians are content with the simpler allegorical interpretation which is more consistent both with Rubens's style and the remainder of the cycle.

It is believed that the original painting mentioned in the letter depicting Marie's departure from Paris was rejected in favor of The Felicity of the Regency due to the more innocuous subject matter of the latter. Rubens, in the same letter, goes on to say,

"This subject, which does not touch on the particular political considerations ... of this reign, nor have reference to any individual, has been very well received, and I believe that had it been entrusted altogether to me the business of the other subjects would have turned out better, without any of the scandal or murmurings."

Here, we can see evidence of the adaptability of Rubens' style which made his career so successful. His willingness to fit his ideas with those of the patron equipped him with the perfect tools to be in charge of such a delicate and heavily anticipated subject.

=== Louis XIII Comes of Age ===
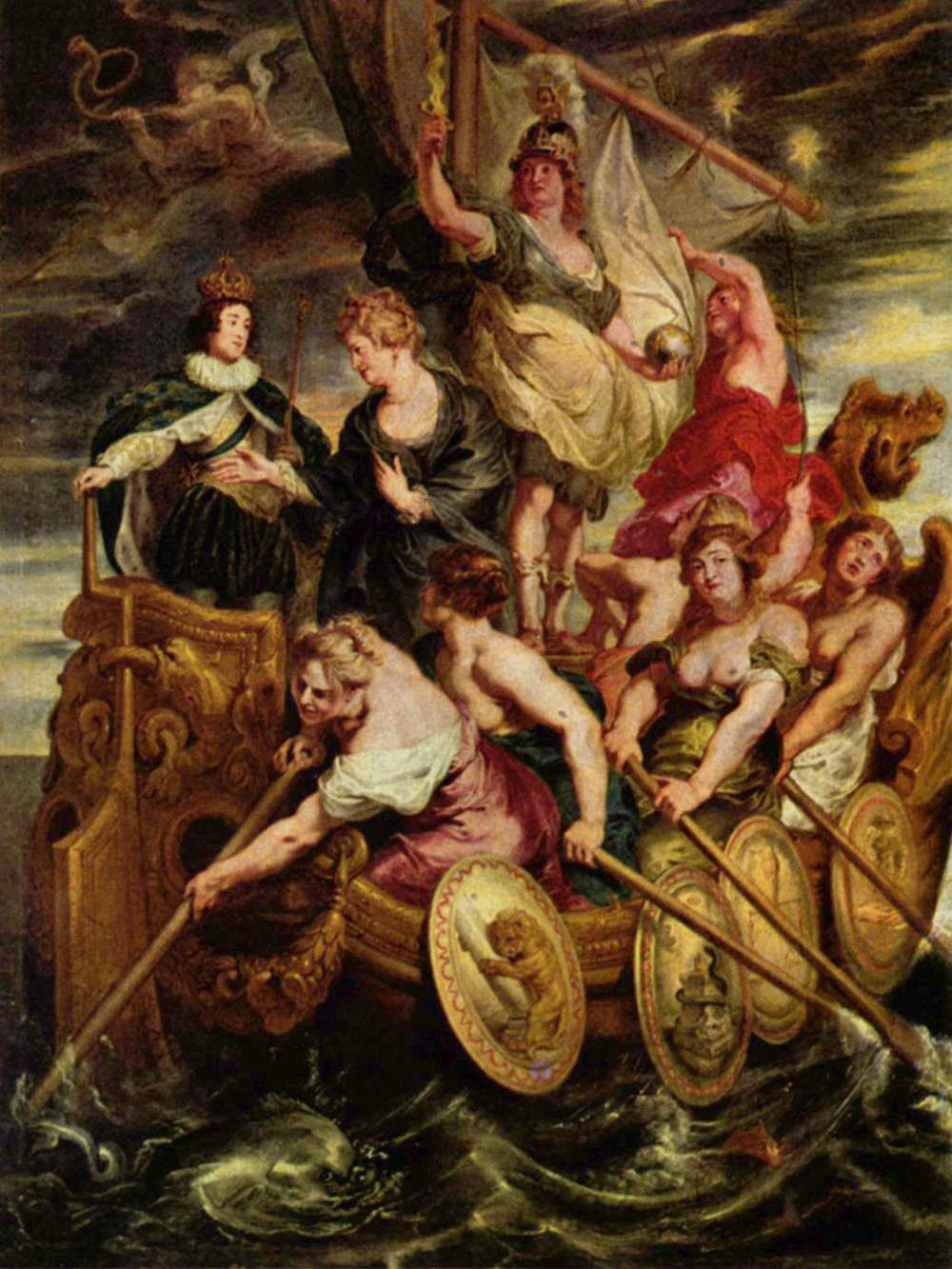
Louis XIII Comes of Age

The painting Louis XIII Comes of Age represents the historical scene of the transferring of power from mother to son in abstract, or allegorical means. Marie has reigned as regent during her son's youth, and now she has handed the rudder of the ship to Louis, the new king of France. The ship represents the state, now in operation as Louis steers the vessel. Each of the rowers can be identified by the emblematic shields that hang on the side of the ship. The second rower's shield depicts a flaming altar with four sphinxes, a coiling serpent and an open eye that looks downwards. These characteristics are known to be that of Piety or Religion, both of which Maria would want her son to embody. What is also known as a parade boat, Rubens referencing Horace's boat, is adorned with a dragon on front and dolphins on the stern. Louis looks upwards to his mother for guidance on how to steer the ship of state. In the violent clouds are two Fames, one with a Roman buccina and the second with what seems to be a trumpet. Louis guides, while the ship's actual movement is due to the four rowing figures, personifying Force, Religion, Justice, and Concord. The figure adjusting the sail is thought to be Prudence or Temperance. At the center in front of the mast stands France, with a flame in her right hand illustrating steadfastness and the globe of the realm, or the orb of government, in her left. Force, extending her oar and heaving to, is identified by the shield just beneath her showing a lion and column. She is paired with Marie by the color of their hair, and similarly Louis is paired with Religion, or the Order of the Holy Spirit. The pairing of Marie with the figure of Force gives power to the image of the queen, while Marie's actual pose is more passive, showing very effectively her graceful acknowledgement of her son's authority henceforth. It is an interesting painting to examine within the context of the tense relationship between the young king and his mother. Marie had clung to power past the end of her regency, until Louis seized power in 1617 and exiled her to Blois. Rubens obviously would have known this and so chose to ignore the tension surrounding Marie's relationship with her son, instead emphasizing her poise in the transfer of power.

=== The Flight from Blois ===
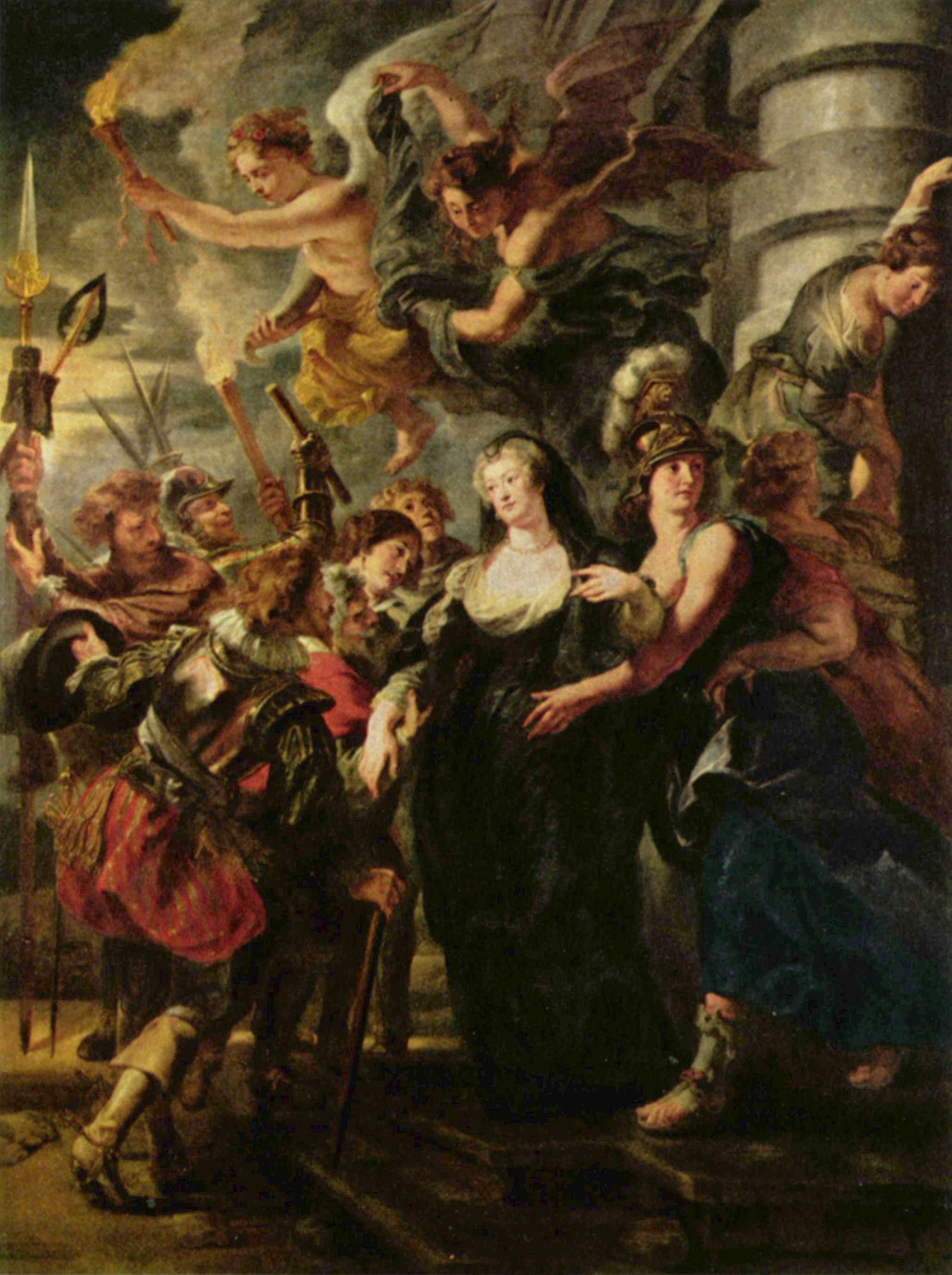
The Flight from Blois

The Flight from Blois is a depiction of Queen Marie escaping from confinement at Blois. The Queen stands in a dignified manner, suggesting her poise in times of disarray, amongst a chaotic crowd of handmaidens and soldiers. She is led by the Duke of Épernon and protected by the goddess Minerva, and guided by illustrations of Night and Aurora. They are used literally to portray the actual time of the event and shield the queen from spectators as they illuminate her path. Rubens painted a scene of the event in a more heroic nature rather than showing the accuracy of realistic elements. According to historical records of the Queen's escape, this painting is not truthfully reflecting the moment of the occurrence. Rubens did not include many of the negative aspects of the event, fearing that he would offend the Queen, which resulted in the paintings non-realistic nature. The Queen Marie is depicted in a humble way, yet the illustration implies her power over the military. She does not express any hardships she had gone through by the escape. The male figures in foreground reaching for her are unknown. The larger figures in the background represent the military, who were added to have a symbolic meaning of the Queen's belief in the command over military.

=== The Negotiations at Angoulême ===
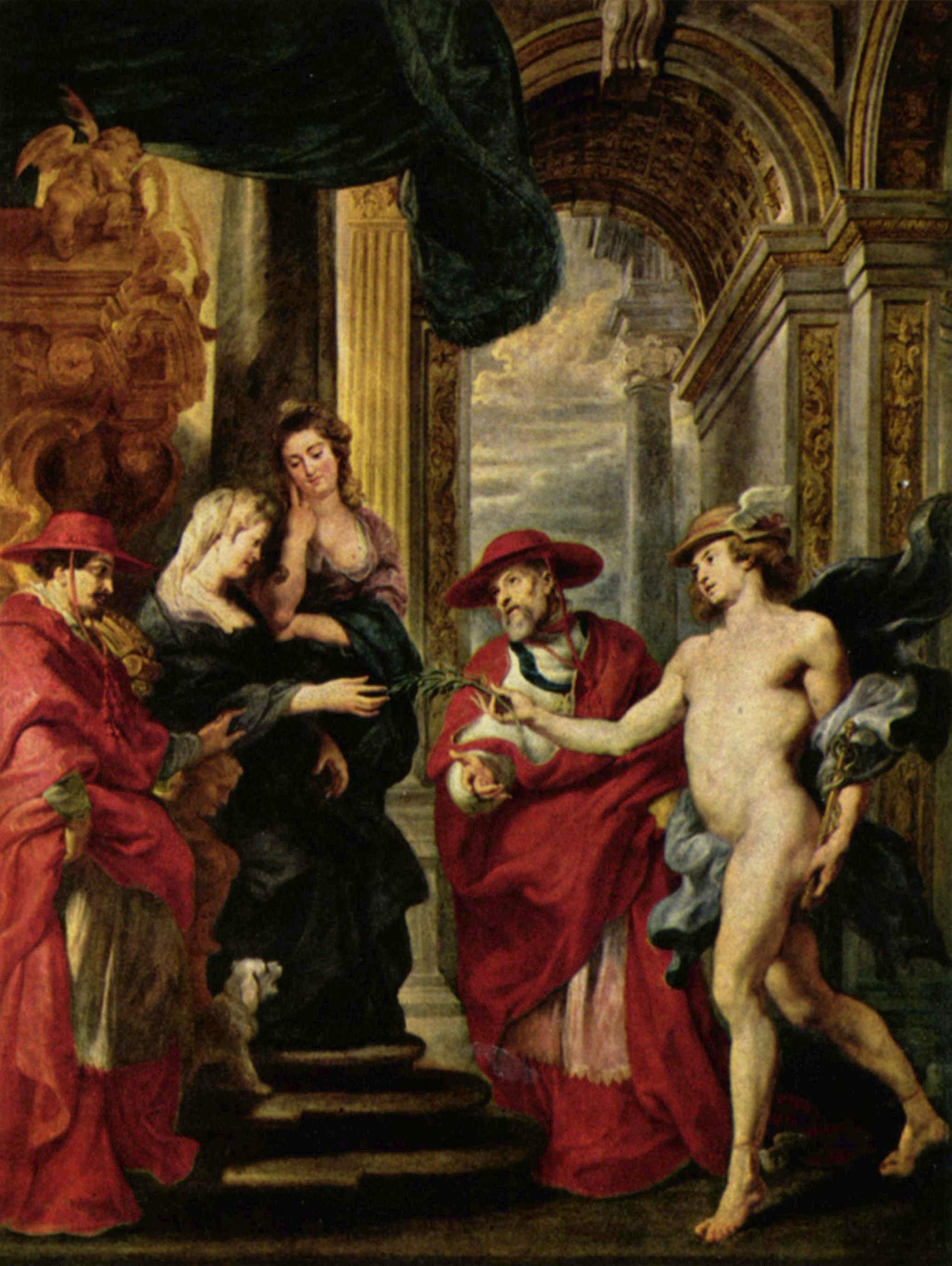
The Negotiations at Angoulême

In The Negotiations at Angoulême, Marie de' Medici genially takes the olive branch from Mercury, the messenger god, in the presence of both of her priests, as she gives her consent to have discussions with her son concerning her clash to his governmental direction. Rubens uses several methods to portray Queen Marie in precisely the light that she wanted to be seen, as her young son's guardian and wise advisor. Enthroned on a pedestal with sculptures of Minerva's symbols of wisdom and two putti holding a laurel wreath to represent victory and martyrdom, the representation of Marie de' Medici is quite clear. Her humble, yet all-knowing gaze conveys the wisdom that she holds. She is also placed compositionally in a tight and unified group with the cardinals, signifying a truthful side opposed to Mercury's dishonesty. Rubens gave Mercury an impression untruthfulness by illustrating his figure hiding a caduceus behind his thigh. The effect of the two groups of figures is meant to stress the gap between the two sides. Rubens also added a barking dog, a common reference used to indicate or warn someone of foreigners who came with evil intention. All of these symbols, Rubens displayed in this ambiguous and enigmatic painting to represent or "misrepresent" Marie de' Medici in the manner that portrayed her as the prudent, yet caring and humble mother of a young and naïve monarch. Overall, this painting is the most problematic or controversial, as well as the least understood out of the entire cycle. This image is of, once again, Marie claiming her of regal authority yet was nonetheless the first step towards peace between mother and son.

=== The Queen Opts for Security ===
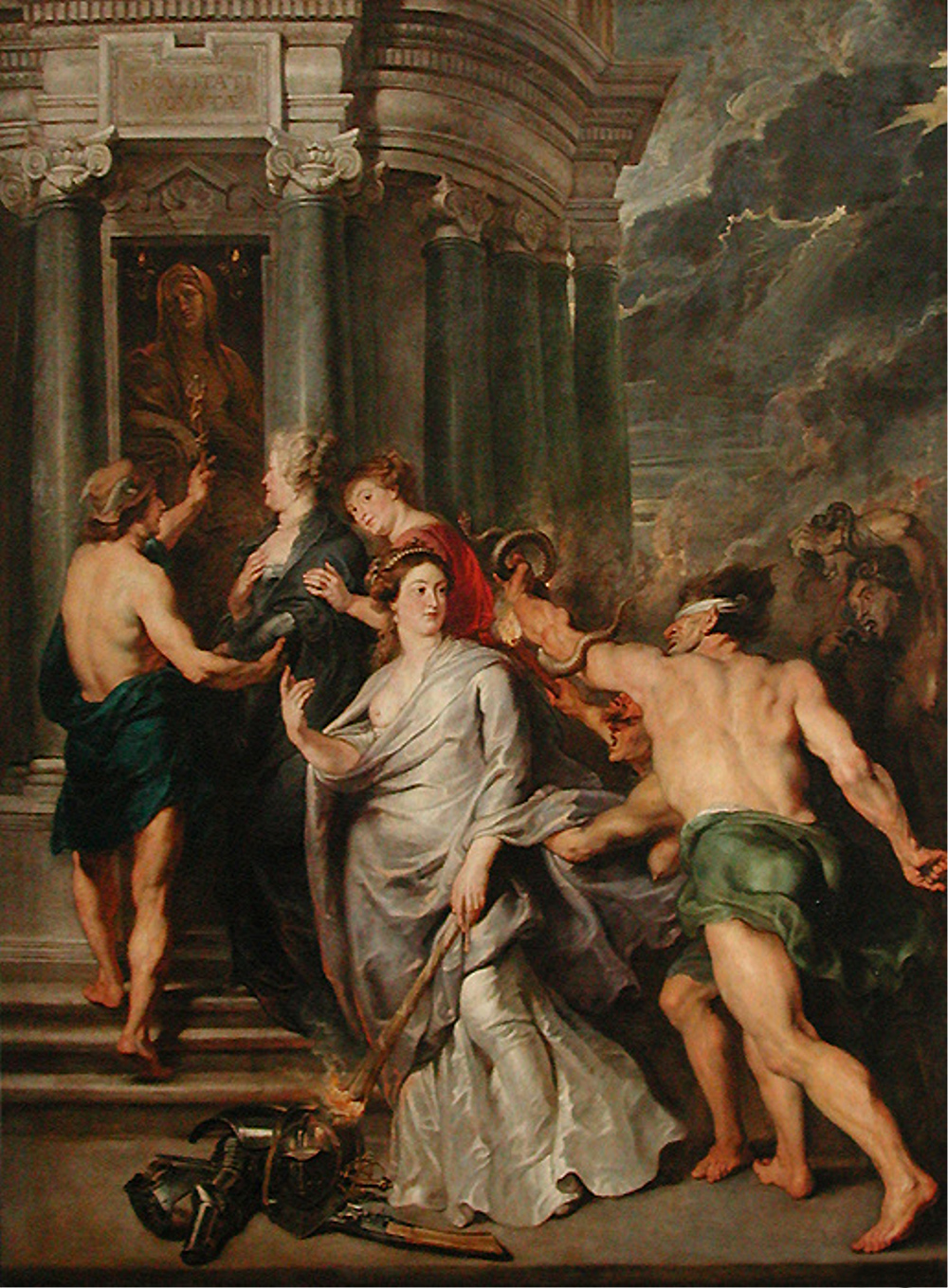
The Queen Opts for Security

Rubens's The Queen Opts for Security represents Marie de' Medici's need for security through a depiction of the event when Marie de' Medici was forced to sign a truce in Angers after her forces had been defeated at Ponte-de-Ce. Though the painting shows Marie de' Medici's desire for security with the representation of the Temple of Security, the symbols of evil at bay, and the change of smoky haze to clarity, there is also underlying symbolism of unrest to the acceptance of the truce. The round shape of the temple, like those built by the ancients to represent the world, and has an Ionic order that is associated with Juno and Maria herself. The temple defines itself, by also including a plaque above the niche that says "Securitati Augustae" or For the Security of the empress. She is shown with the snakes of the caduceus emblem having uneasy movement and the forced escorting of the queen by Mercury into the Temple of Peace give the feeling of a strong will not to be defeated. It can also be debated that the painting is not really about peace or security, but really an unrelenting spirit that does not give into loss. As she is a divine power, she is heroically depicted in a classical setting using neoplatonic hierarchy and visual cues of light on her face. These ultimately imply that this allegory of Marie de' Medici is an apotheosis. Additionally, the inclusion of two differently adorned personifications of Peace hints at the fact that Rubens wanted to confuse or excite the viewer to look deeper into this particular painting as a whole.

=== Reconciliation of the Queen and her Son ===
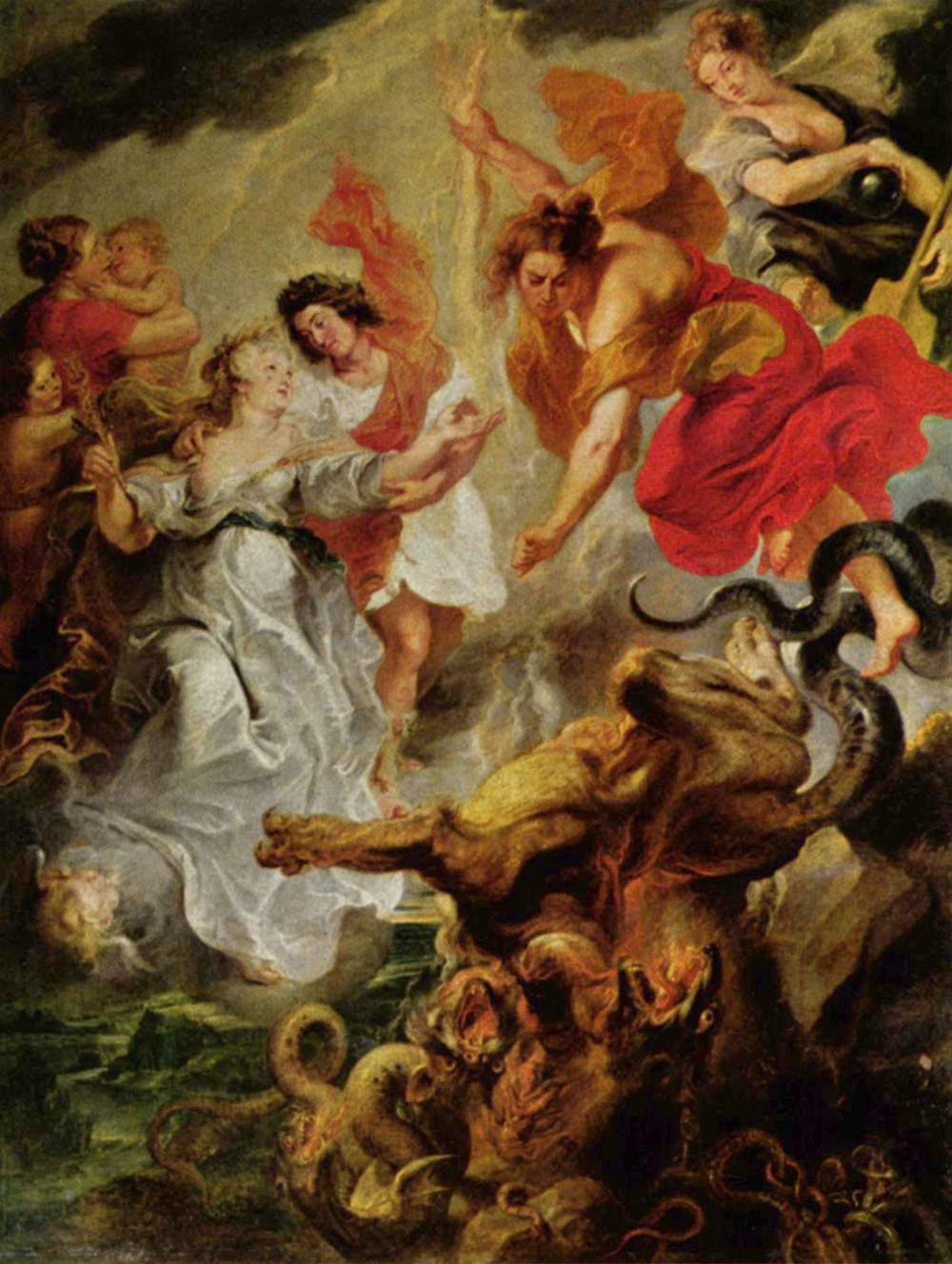
Reconciliation of the Queen and her son

The Return of the Mother to Her Son tenuously held an alternate title The Full Reconciliation with the Son after the Death of the High Constable until the temperament of the nation was assessed. The many headed hydra struck a fatal blow by Divine Justice as witnessed by Divine Providence, a theme based on a classical seventeenth century metaphor for insurrection. Here the monster is a stand in for the dead Constable de Luynes who has met its demise at the hand of a feminine Saint Michael. The death in 1621 of the falconer turned supreme commander may have improved the tensions between mother and son, but Henri II, Prince of Condé, considered the most dangerous of Marie de' Medici's foes quickly stepped in to fill the gap. Rubens’ deliberate vagueness would be consistent with his practice of generalizing and allegorizing historical facts especially in a painting about peace and reconciliation. Marie, desiring vindication for the death of her close personal friend, Concino Concini, would likely have intended a more direct personal allusion to Constable de Luynes, but Rubens preferring to keep to allegory, avoided specifics that could later prove embarrassing. The artist chose the high road, relying on Ripa's visual vernacular, to portray a scene where virtues defeat vices and embrace peaceful reconciliation making little more than an allusion to a vague political statement.

It is not hard to imagine the much-maligned scapegoat Luynes as the one suffering divine punishment and being thrown into the pits of hell while assuming all the blame for the animosity between Louis XIII and his mother. In this painting, Louis XIII, represented as an adult, is depicted as Apollo. The hydra's death is not at the hand of Apollo as might be expected. Instead it is left to an Amazon-like vision of Providence/Fate. With the removal of the scales she carried in an earlier sketch that would have connected her to Louis XII, we are left with an entity who with no help from Louis, slays the adversary as he appears oblivious and unconcerned. Marie de' Medici however, emerges as a loving mother, ready to forgive all evils and pain endured.

=== The Triumph of Truth ===
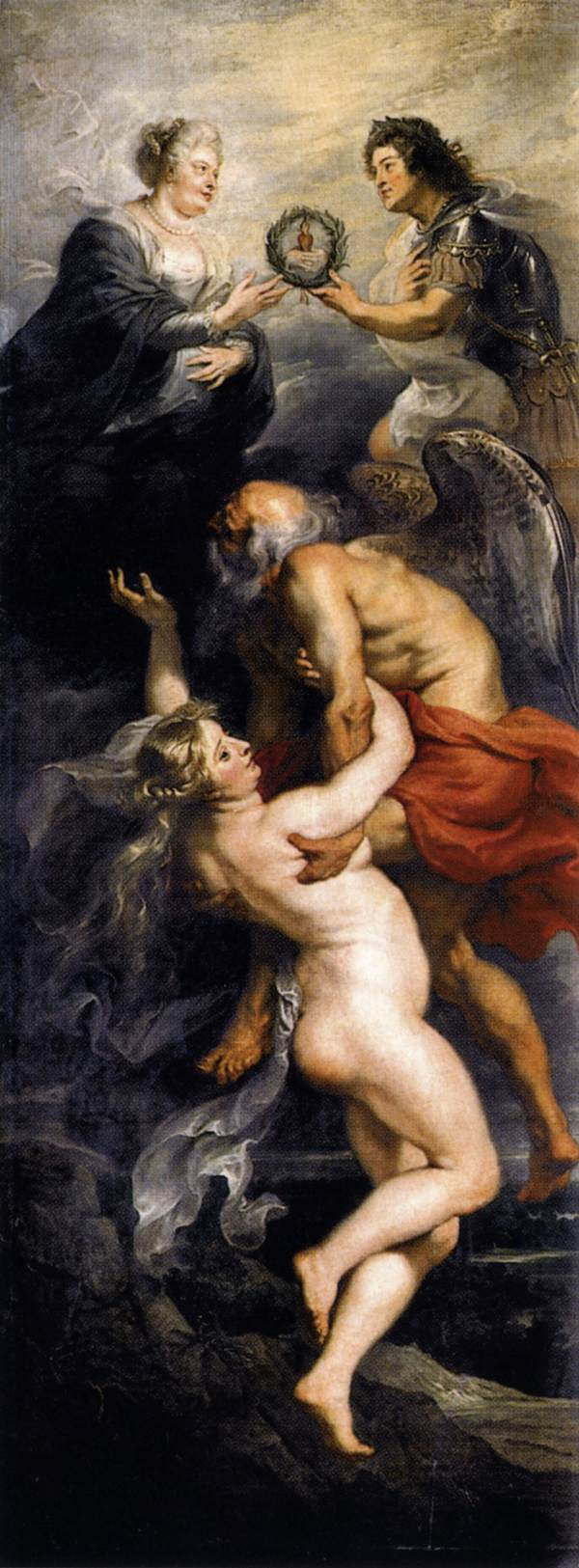
The Triumph of Truth

The last painting in the cycle, The Triumph of Truth, is a purely allegorical depiction of King Louis XIII and his mother, the Queen, reconciling before heaven. The Queen and Louis XIII are depicted floating in heaven, connected by the symbol of concordia, which demonstrates her sons’ forgiveness and the peace that was reached between them. Below, Saturn raises Veritas to heaven which symbolizes truth being, "brought to the light", as well as the reconciliation between the Queen and her son. The illustrations of Time and Truth occupy almost 3/4 of the lower canvas. The upper part of the canvas is filled with renderings of Marie and her son. In the composition, Marie is depicted as much larger than her son and occupies much more space. Her larger, less obscured body is turned frontally on the picture plane, which emphasizes her importance. Her importance is further highlighted by her equal height to her son, the King. Her son who is obscured in part by the Wing of Time, kneels before the queen and presents her with the token of amity, the clasped hands and flaming heart within a laurel crown. Compositionally, Rubens gives the queen greater importance in this panel through the use of gestures and gazes. In the work, Truth gestures toward the Queen while Time looks toward her from below. Both figures ignore the King. Rubens artfully projected both mother and son into the future, depicting them as more aged and mature than in the preceding panel (Peace is Confirmed in Heaven). It is at this point that the Medici Cycle changes to the subject of the Queen Mother's reign. With the death of son Louis' court favorite, Charles d'Albert de Luynes, mother and son reconcile. Marie receives ultimate vindication by being re-admitted to the Council of State in January 1622. This picture represents how time thus uncovers the truth in correspondence to the relationship between Marie and her son.

The final painting coincided with Marie's interest in politics after the death of her husband. She believed that diplomacy should be obtained through marriage and it is the marriage of her daughter Henrietta Maria to Charles I that rushed the completion of the Medici Cycle.

=== The Portraits of The Queen's Parents ===
The remaining three paintings are portraits of Marie de' Medici, her father Francesco I de' Medici and her mother Johanna of Austria. On either side of the fireplace in the gallery are the portraits of the Queen's parents. The portrait of the Queen's father, Francesco I, is on the right and faces the passageway towards Marie de' Medici's private chambers. Francesco I is depicted wearing an ermine-lined mantle with a cross around his neck which represents the Tuscan order of Saint Stephen which his father founded. The portrait of the Queen's mother, Johanna of Austria, is on the left at the place where visitors enter. She is shown wearing a gown of silver cloth with gold embroidery and wears nothing that suggests her esteemed background. The model, or overall design, for this portrait of Johanna of Austria goes back to a painting by Alessandro Allori that was then copied by Giovanni Bizzelli. Rubens must have seen these paintings and therefore influenced his own style for depicting the Queen's mother. Although, surprisingly, Rubens' version is considered even less remarkable than the models. This portrait of Johanna of Austria is overall an inexpressive image of a woman. He excluded the traditional 16th Century hieratic poise for a relaxed interpretation, where she wears regularized drapery and Rubens adorns her in that of the state of always being sick and weak. In contrast, no model for the portrait of the Queen's father is known, although it is questioned if he used ideas from one from Paris that, in which he wanted to convey the authoritative appearance of historical figures. Specifically, the statues of Fracesco and Ferdinando de Medici. The two portraits are stylistically very different, and even out of place, from the rest of the paintings in the gallery. These paintings of her parents in Marie de' Medici's reception hall look bleak in comparison to the portrait of Marie, where she is looking beautiful if not vain. Although Rubens made great use of allegorical images throughout most of the paintings in the gallery, the two portraits of the Queen's parents are compositionally straightforward and unremarkably executed. Moreover, they are considered to be far from "likenesses" of either sitter.

== Henry IV Cycle ==
The original commission for the Marie de' Medici cycle included a corresponding gallery illustrating the life of Henry IV that was never completed, although Rubens began work soon after he completed the Marie de' Medici cycle. The Henry cycle called for twenty-four monumental scenes of Henry's life depicting "the encounters he was engaged in, his combats, conquests, and sieges of towns with the Triumphs of said victories." Marie and Henry's separate wings were designed to meet in an arcade that would unite the two galleries. The paintings of each gallery would have been exhibited as an integrated pair, unifying all forty-eight scenes.

It appears that Rubens did not make any sketches for the Henry IV cycle while he was engaged with the first gallery. In one of his letters the artist describes the theme as "so large and magnificent that it would suffice for ten galleries". Judging by another statement of his on 27 January 1628, he did not engage much in sketching before that date. Of the oil sketches executed later by him, only nine survive, along with five large unfinished canvasses. Most of the sketches represent actual battles in which Henry was involved, such as The Capture of Paris.

The reasons for not completing the Henry IV cycle had to do with the current political events of the time. Marie de' Medici was banished from Paris in 1631 as Cardinal Richelieu gained power over Louis XIII. Consequently, the project was abandoned completely due to approval of the plans for the gallery being repeatedly delayed by the French court. Richelieu, who now had full control of the cycle, refused to speak to Rubens about completing the Henry Gallery based on the falsehood that he was tending to affairs of the state. Richelieu's true motivations were most likely political. During this time, Rubens was in Madrid preparing for a diplomatic mission to London, working towards the rapprochement of Spain and England. The commissioned artist being active in an opposing political parties was cause for Richelieu to object. He was thus actively seeking for an Italian artist to replace Rubens, which resulted in Rubens only sporadically continuing his work. After Marie's banishment in 1631, the project was to be completely abandoned, which seems a travesty seeing as Rubens was very optimistic about the project and its effects on his career; "I have now begun the designs of the other gallery which, in my judgment, because of the nature of the subject will prove to be more splendid than the first so that I hope I shall rather gain [in reputation] than decline."

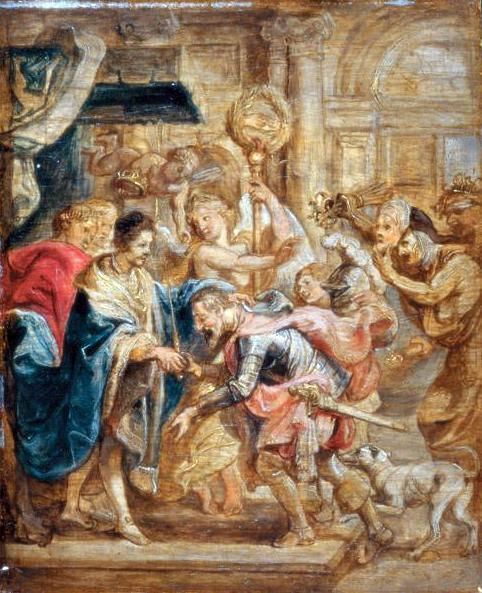
The Reconciliation of King Henry III and Henry of Navarre

An important sketch from the collection is the so-called Reconciliation of King Henry III and Henry of Navarre – a significant event for Henry IV's ascent to the throne. After the death of Francis, Duke of Anjou, brother of the childless King Henry III, the apparent heir was to be Henry of Navarre (the future King Henry IV). However, when a papal bull denied him the throne and excommunicated him, Henry of Navarre protested, starting the War of the Three Henrys. When Henry III was also ostracized from Paris for initiating the murder of the duke of Guise, he met with Henry of Navarre to make peace and recognize him as rightful heir. Although Rubens depicted this reconciliation as taking place in a throne room, contemporary reports recorded that it was actually in a garden full of spectators. The sketch shows Henry of Navarre bowing down in Henry III's presence, which eyewitness accounts confirm was accurate. Rubens represented a putto taking the crown of Henry III, with the intention of placing it on the willing future Henry IV, although the actual transfer of power didn't occur until Henry III's assassination several months later (1 August 1589). A page stands behind Henry of Navarre holding his personal badge: a white plumed helmet, while the dog at his feet represents fidelity. The two ominous figures behind Henry III most likely represent personifications of Fraud and Discord.

The Henry IV cycle was planned to be composed of scenes from the king's military career. The violence of these images would contrast nicely with the relative peace and regal quality of the scenes in the Marie de' Medici cycle. The Battle of Ivry on the East Wall of the gallery is a scene of Henry's most decisive battle to unify the city of Paris. Primarily gray, the sketch shows the king in crimson velvet to stand out in "the most famous of all the battles of Henry IV." He is shown in the center of the scene raising a flaming sword. His victorious army rushes in chaotically behind him; horses rearing and riders falling. This painting corresponds to the Coronation painting in the Marie de' Medici cycle.

The Triumphal Entry into Paris is the culminating point of the North End of the gallery. Being the king's last major battle fought, this served as an optimal location. Rubens wanted it to be at the end of the gallery as a "large and important" piece with an advanced state of execution. The painting shows Henry parading into Paris as a victorious Roman emperor holding an olive branch, the symbol of peace. However, because Henry never actually entered Paris in this fashion, the scene is supposed to represent only a symbolic triumph. Henry's action and setting (the buildings and a triumphal arch) were not really possible in Paris at this time, reassuring that the scene is not based on historical fact, but a classical metaphor and Henry's goal of remaining King of France. This painting coincides with Apotheosis and Ascendancy in the Marie cycle.

The Clemency of Henry in Paris corresponds to the Olympian peace scene in the Marie cycle, with Henry's peace as earthly and Marie's as celestial. Henry's painting, beginning the West Wall of the gallery, depicts the scenes following the capture of Paris. Henry's army casts the rebels out of Paris by throwing them over a bridge into the river below. In the left corner, however, the new ruler himself discusses clemency with a few advisers.

== Gallery ==
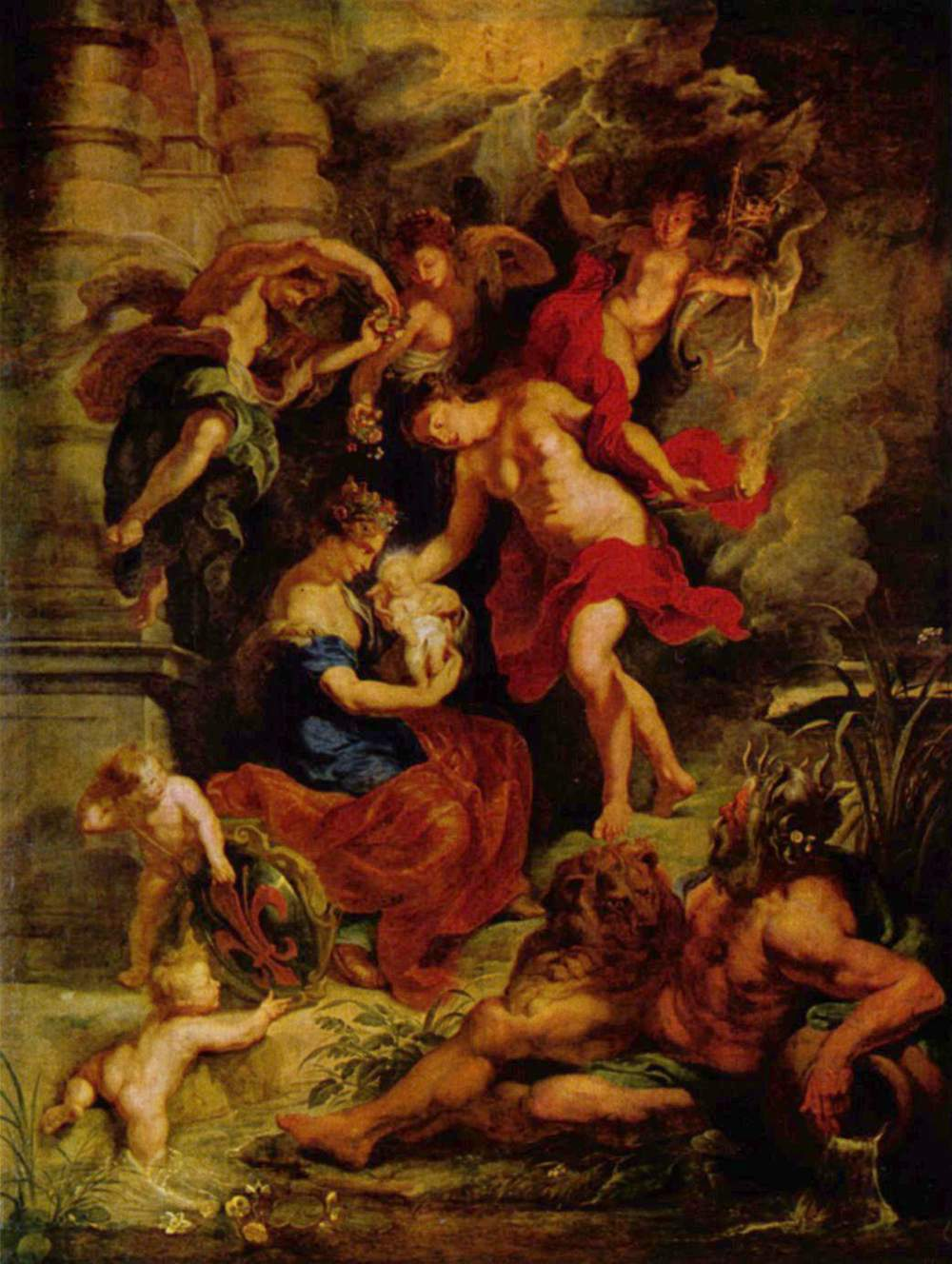
The Birth of the Princess, in Florence on 26 April 1573

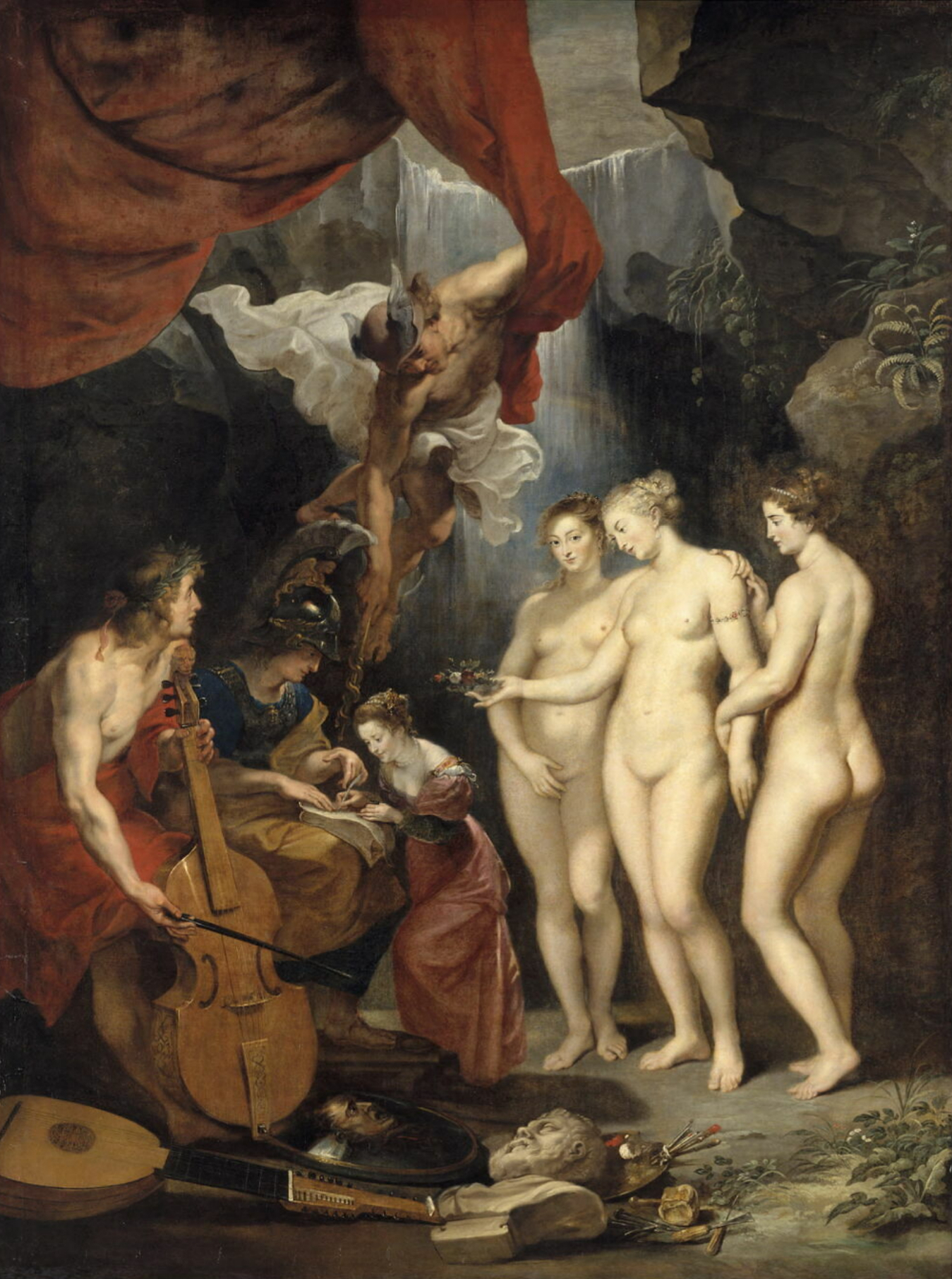
The Education of the Princess

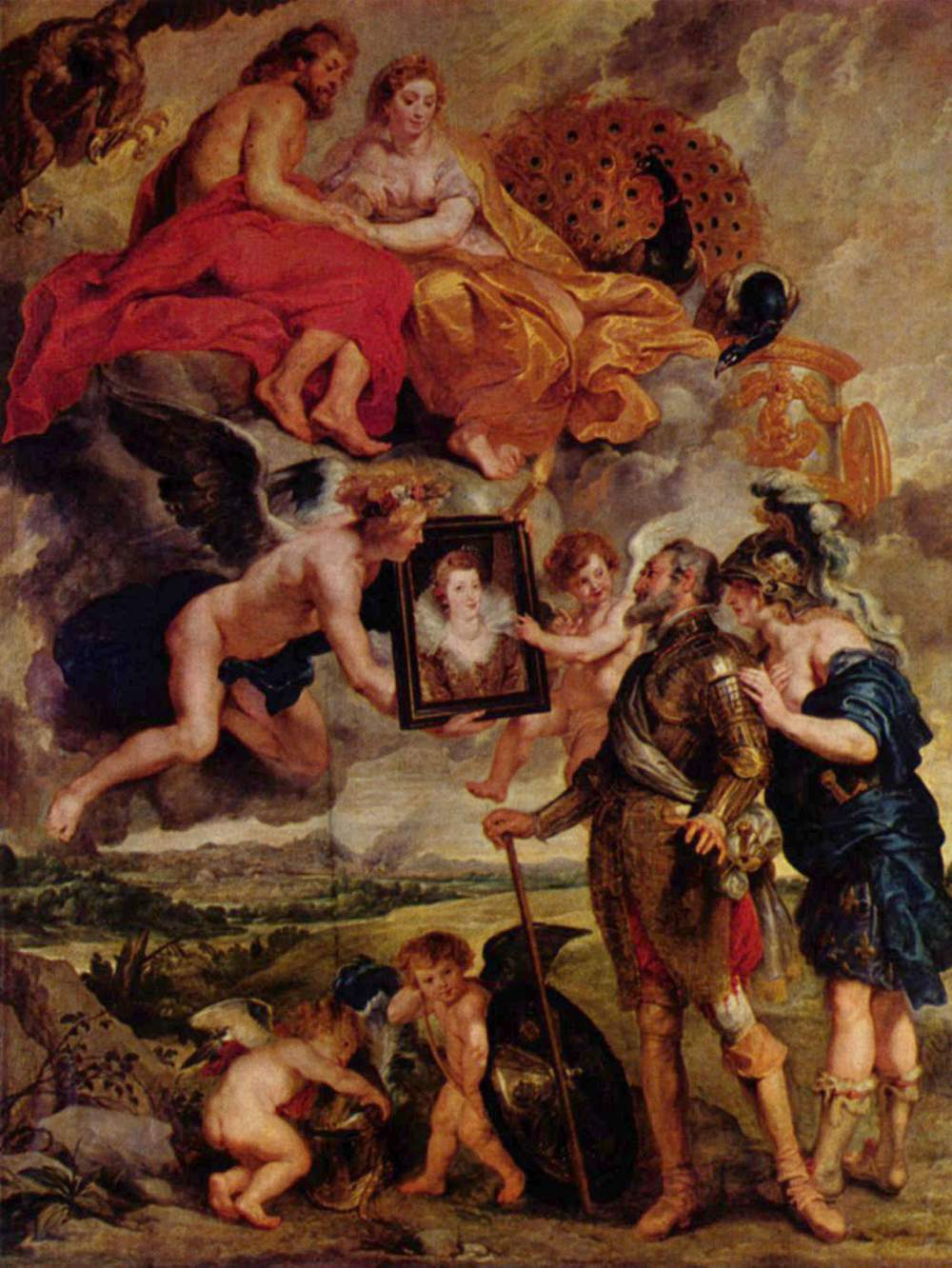
The Presentation of Her Portrait to Henry IV

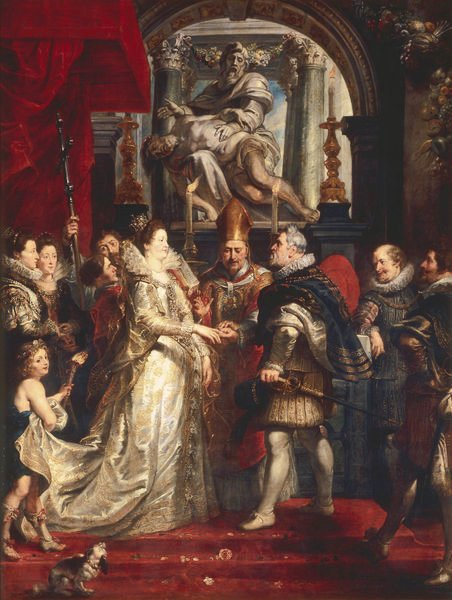
The Wedding by Proxy of Maria de’ Medici to King Henry IV

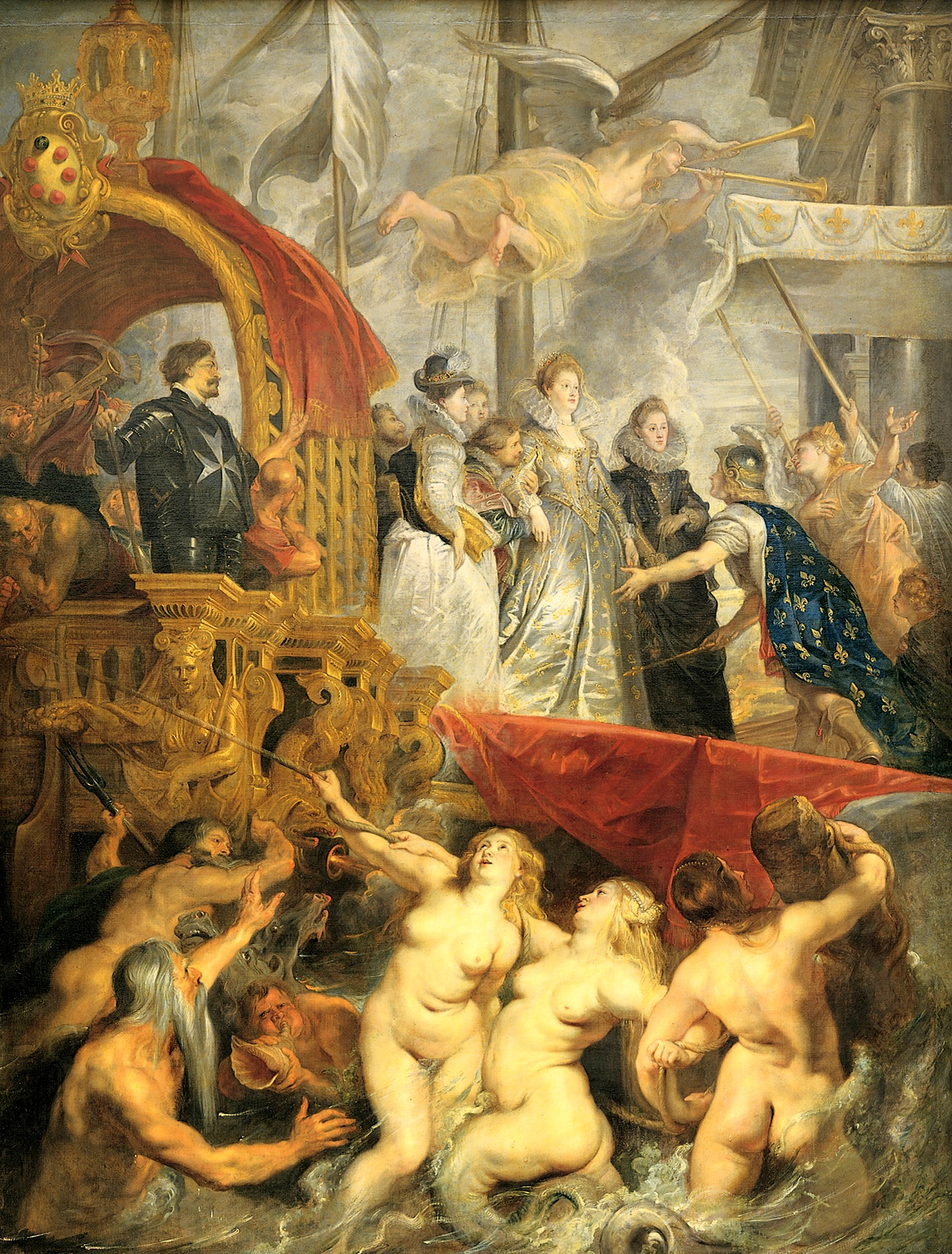
The Disembarkation at Marsailles

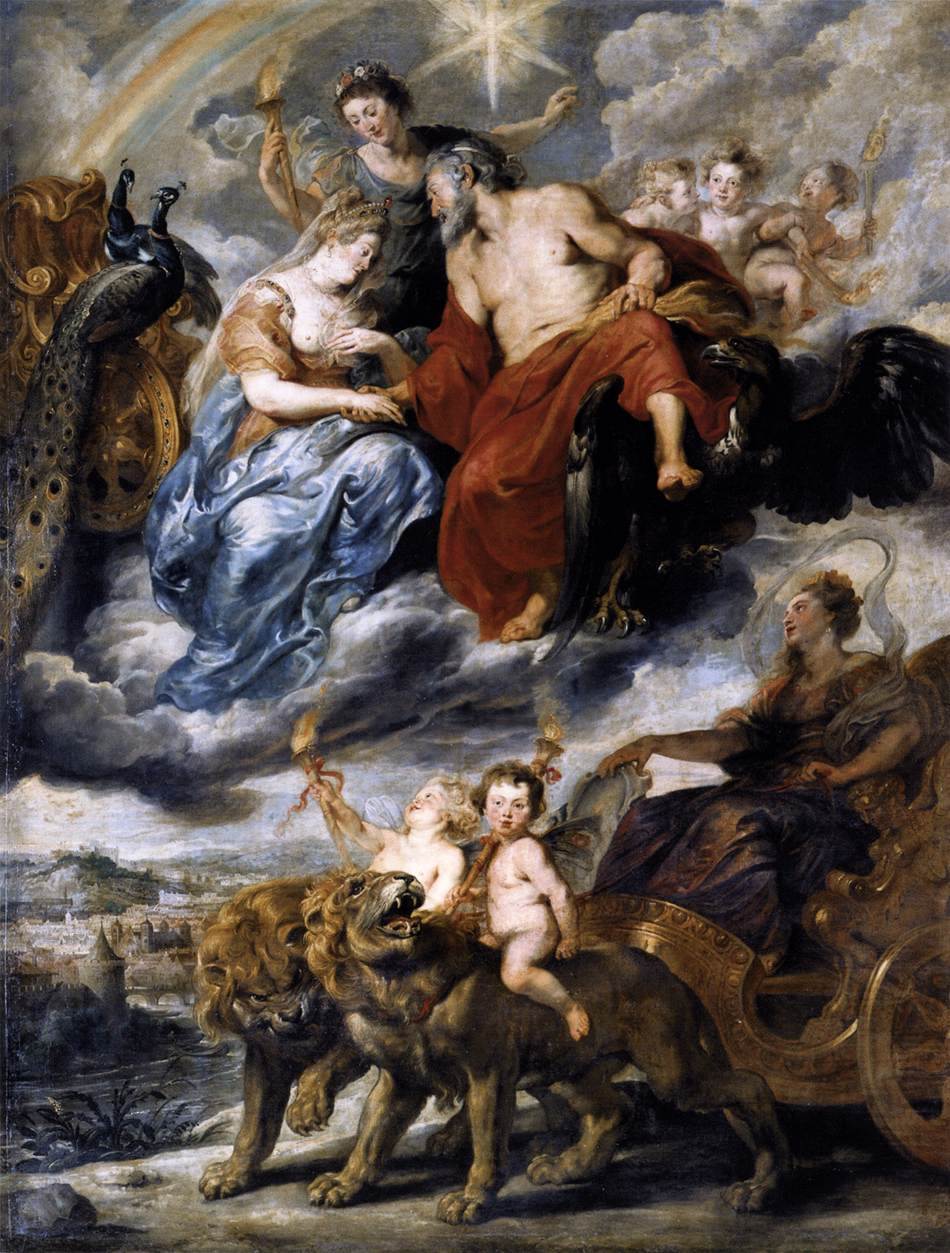
The Meeting of Marie de Médicis and Henri IV at Lyon

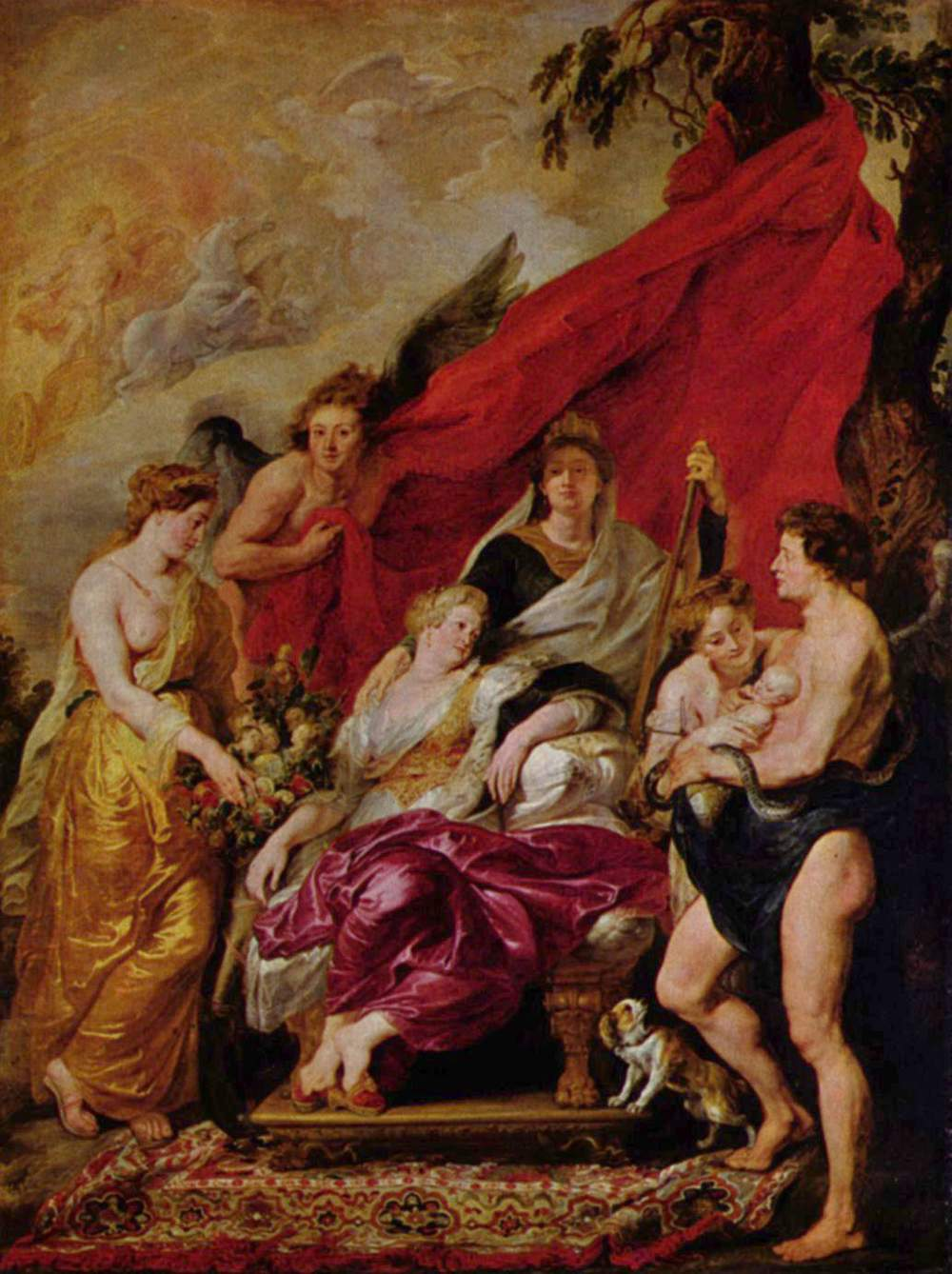
The Birth of the Dauphin at Fountainbleau

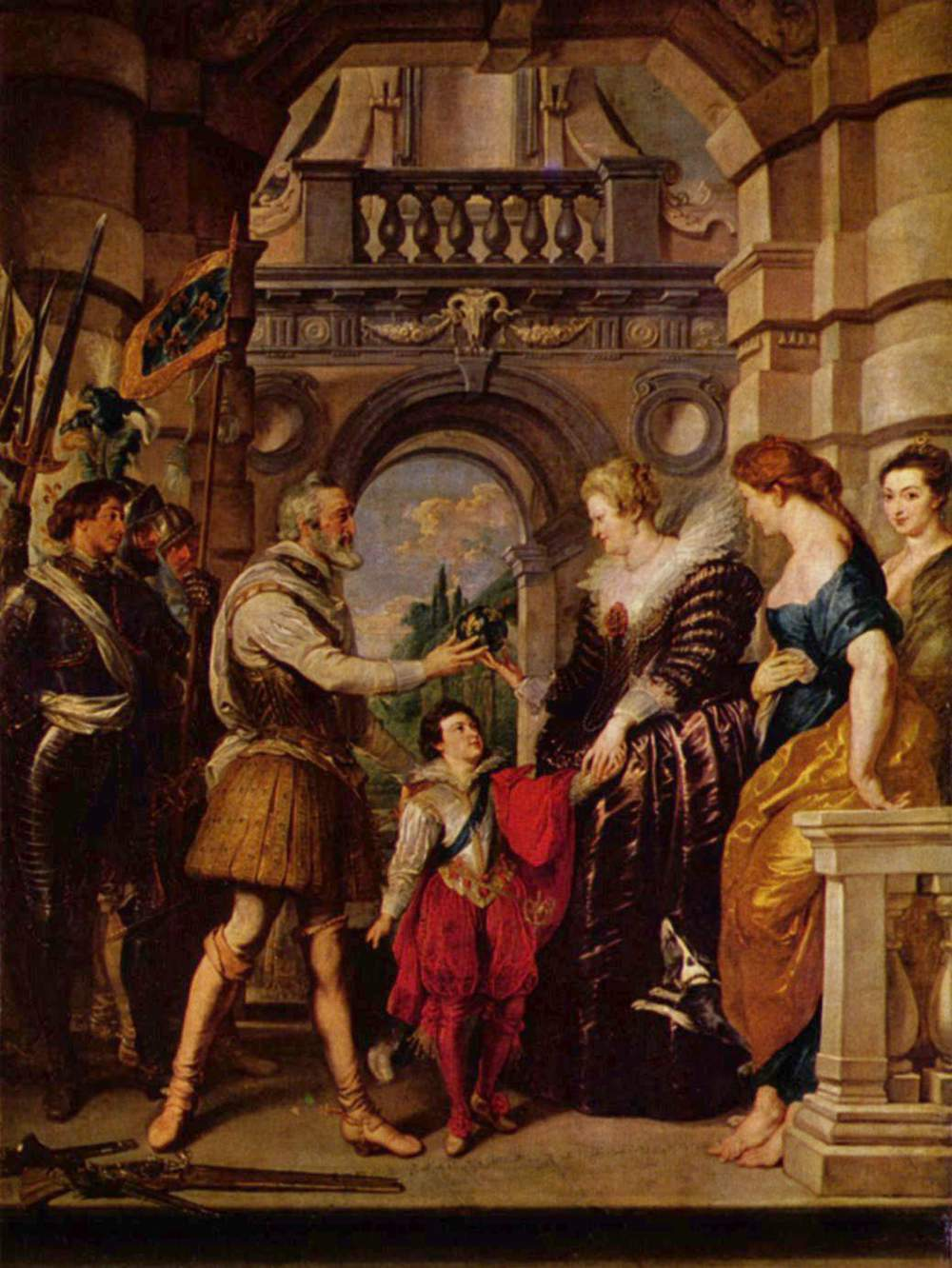
The Consignment of the Regency

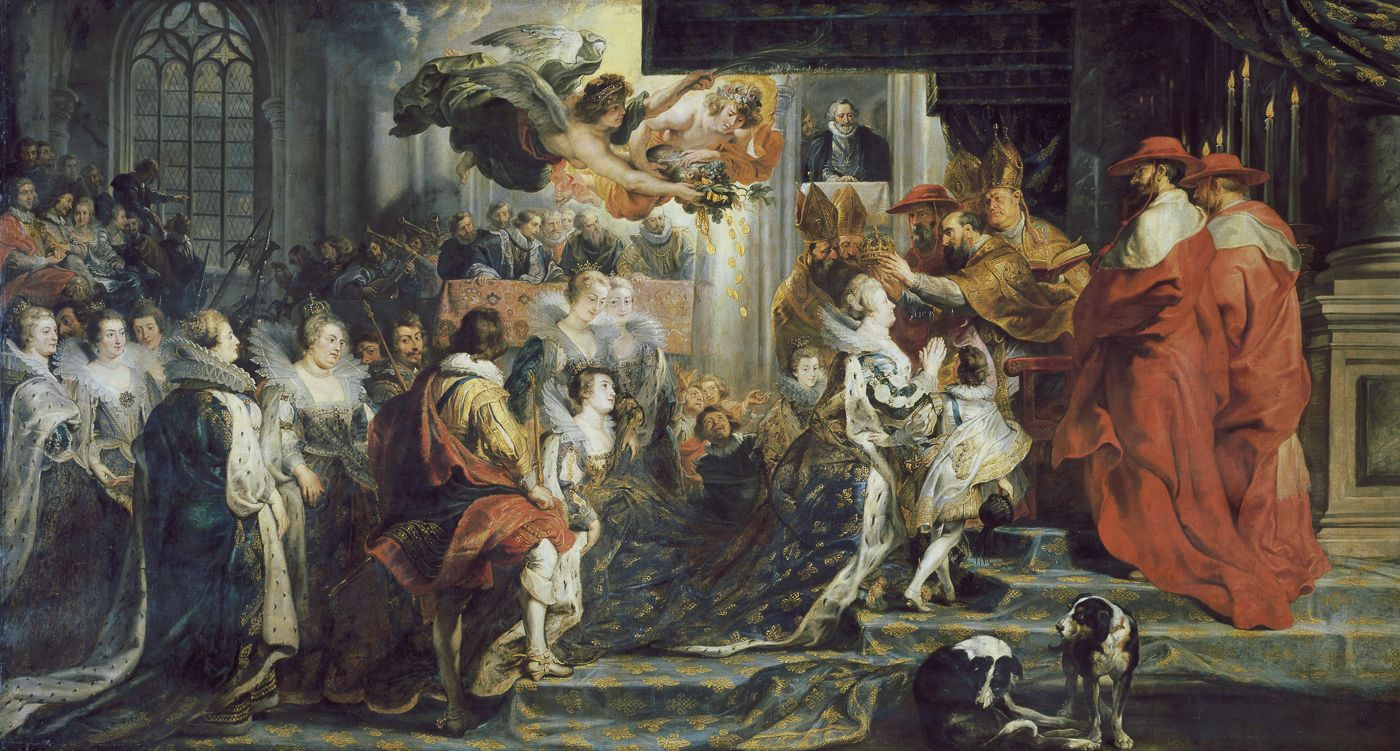
The Coronation in Saint-Denis

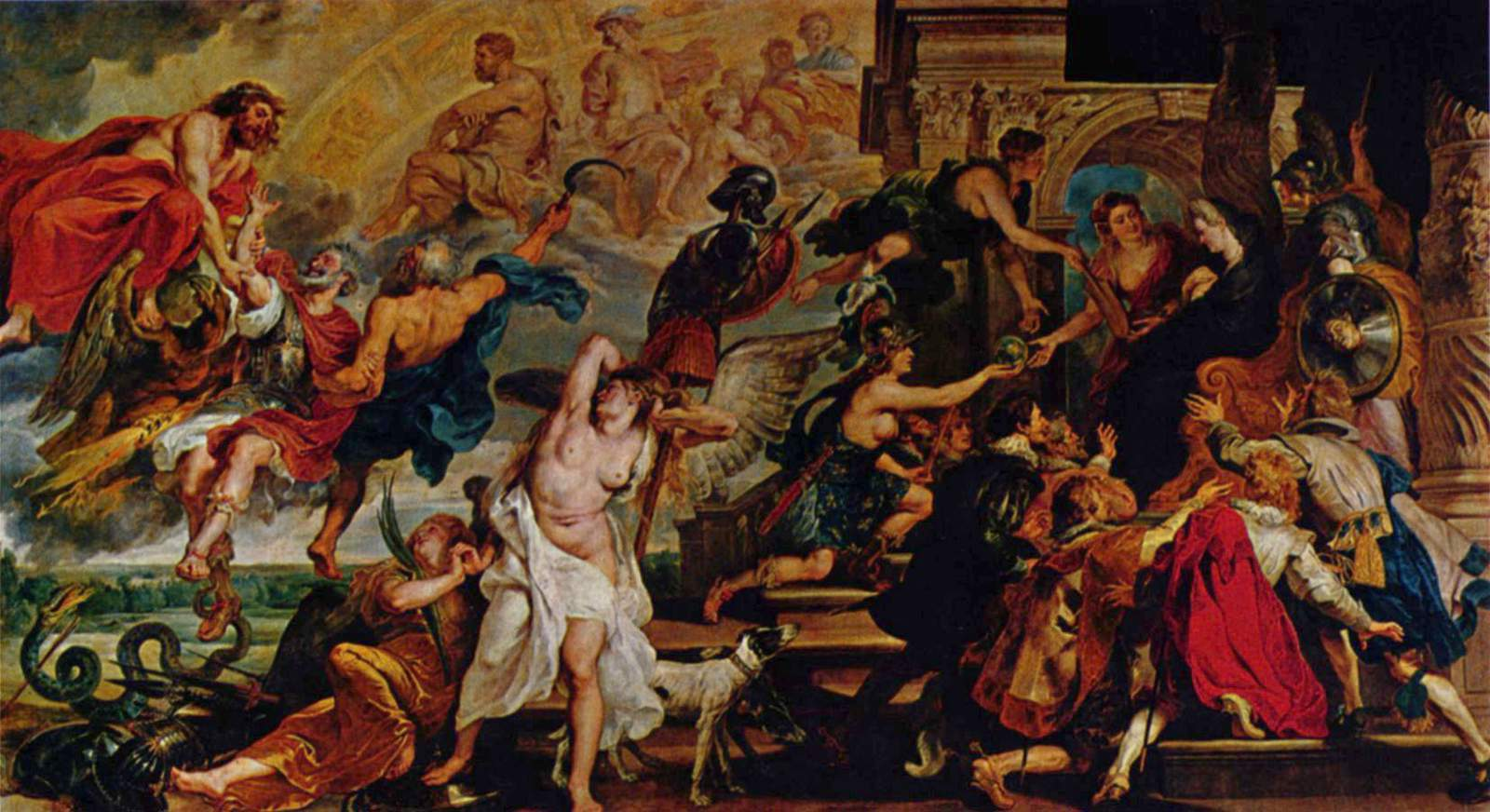
The Death of Henry IV and the Proclamation of the Regency

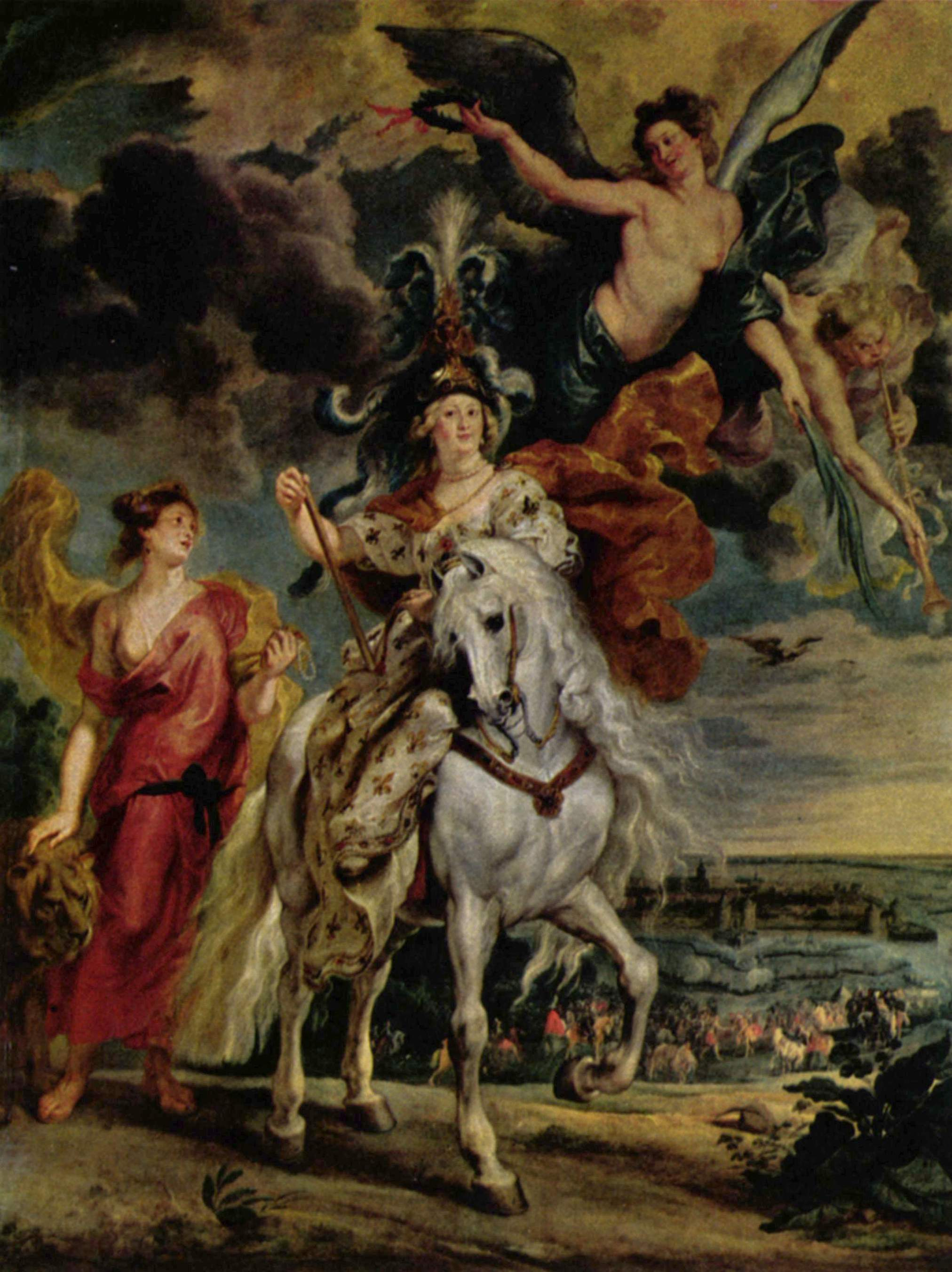
The Victory at Jülich

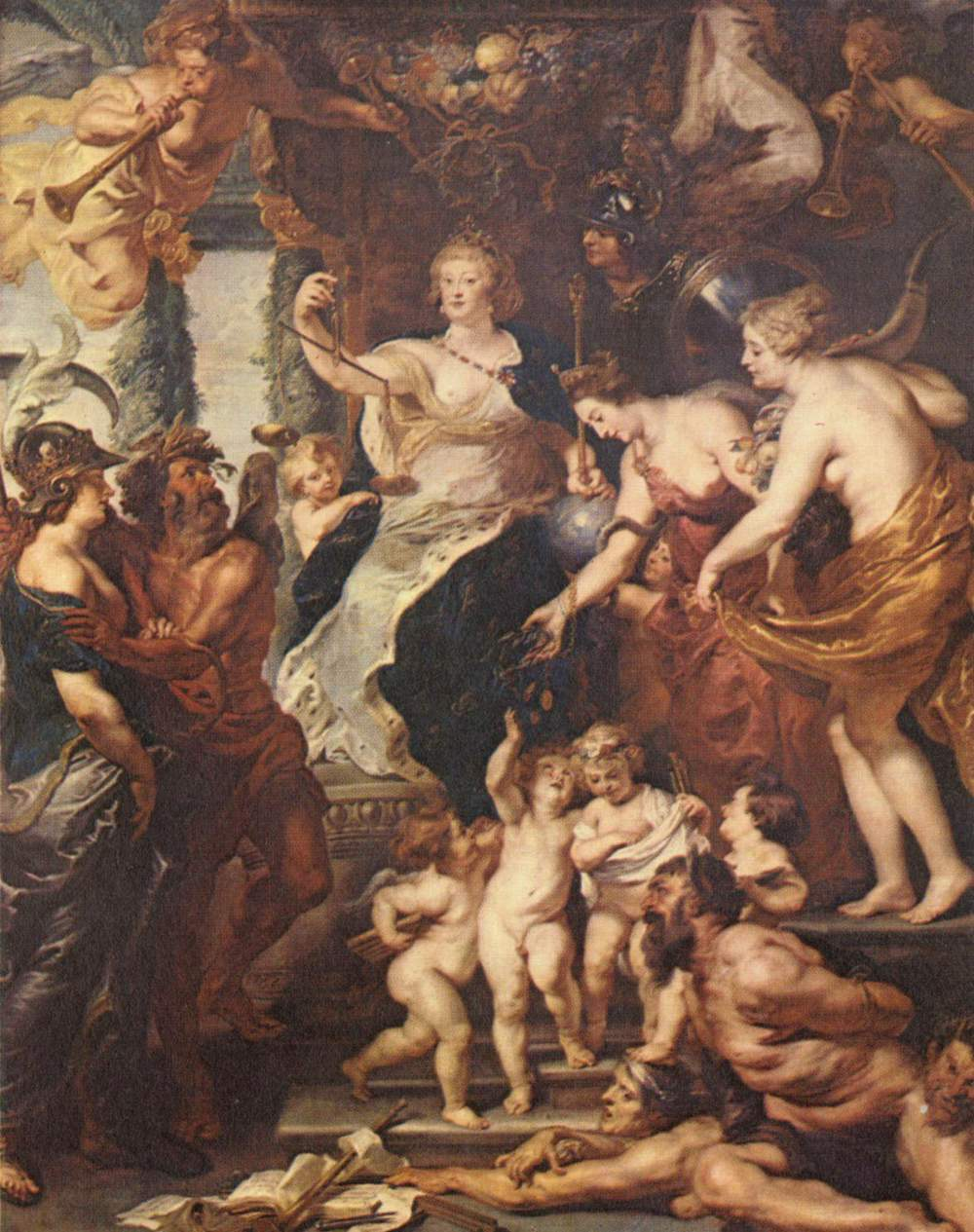
The Felicity of the Regency of Marie de' Medici

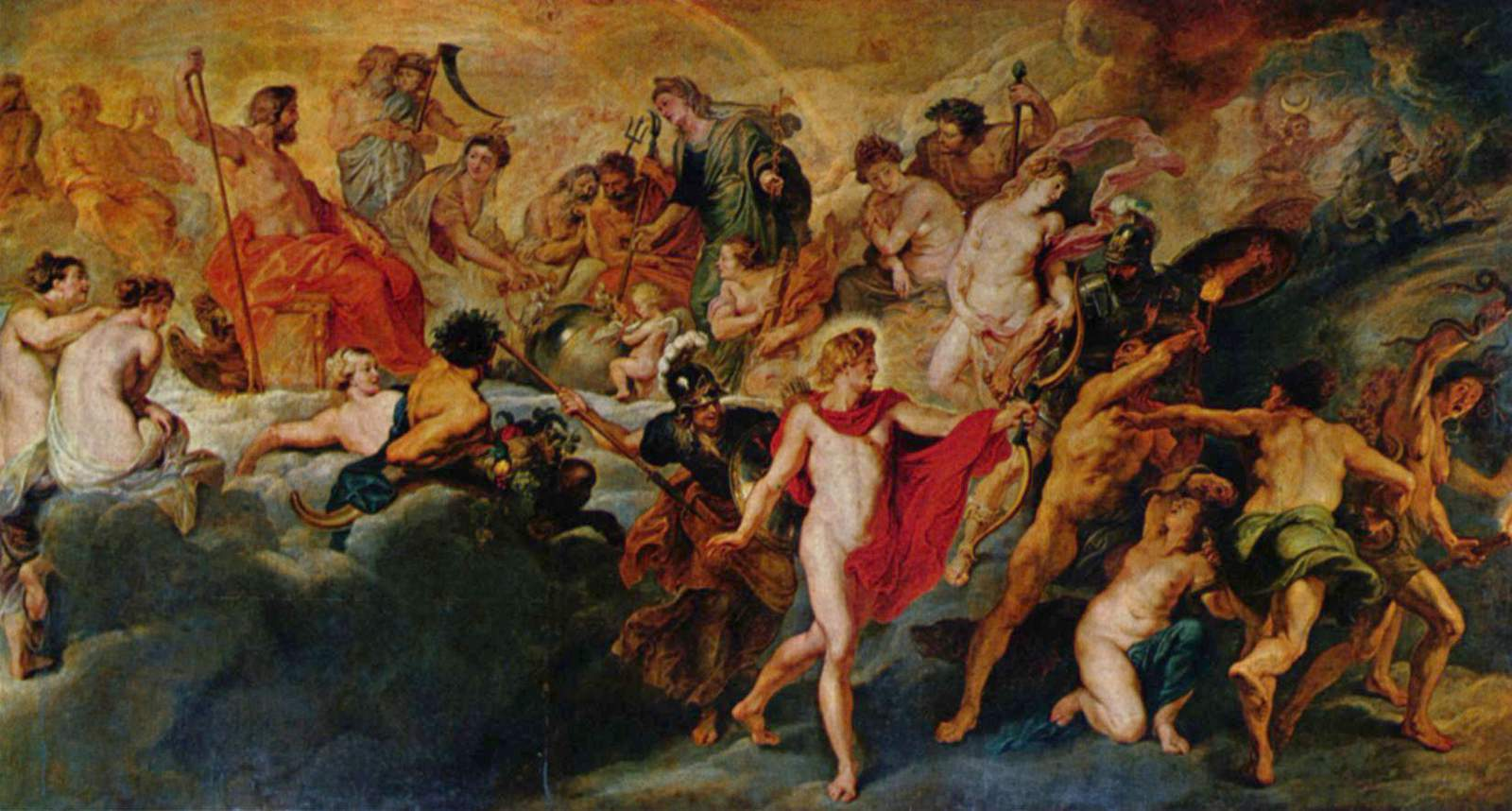
The Council of the Gods

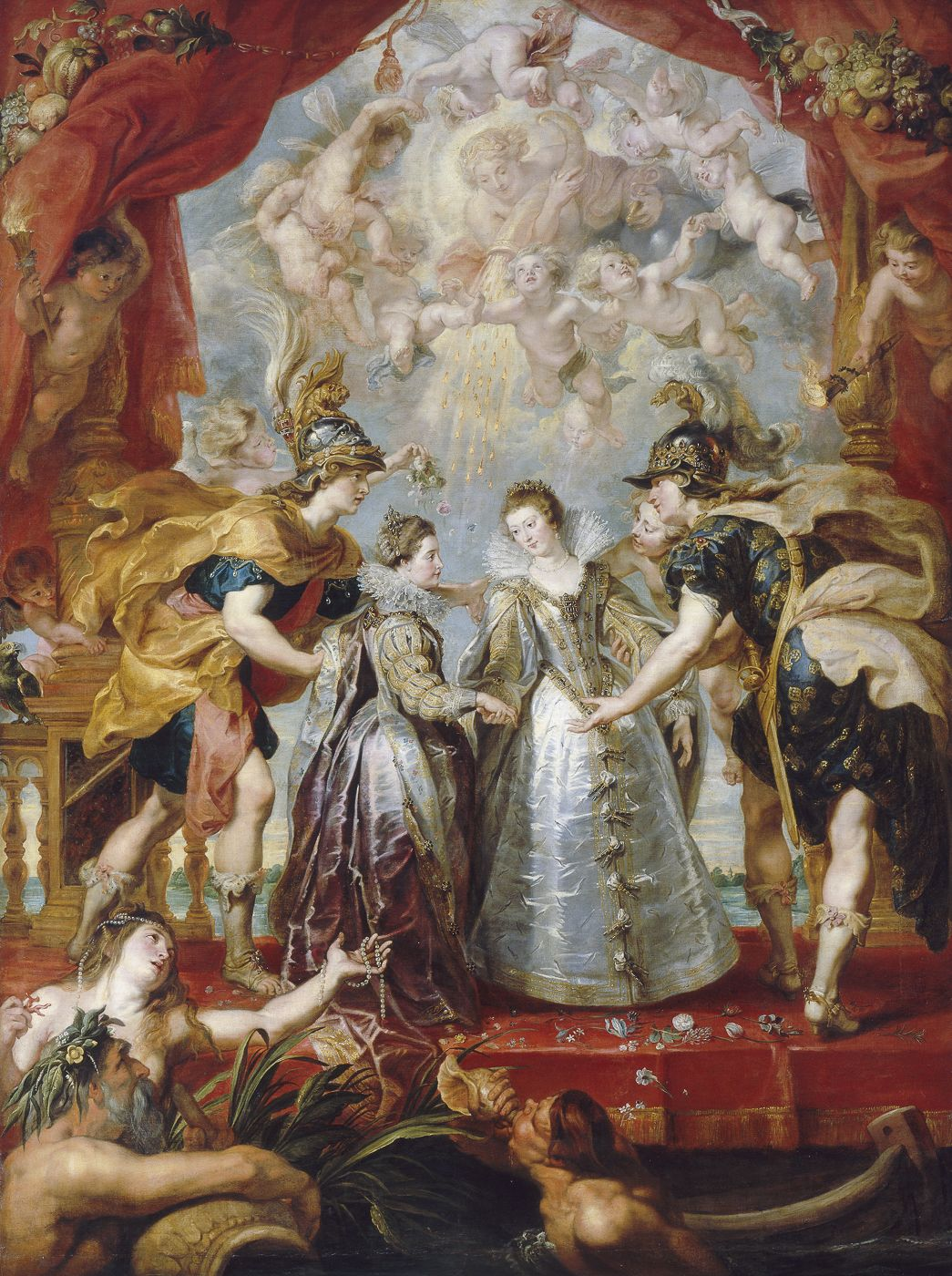
The Exchange of Princesses

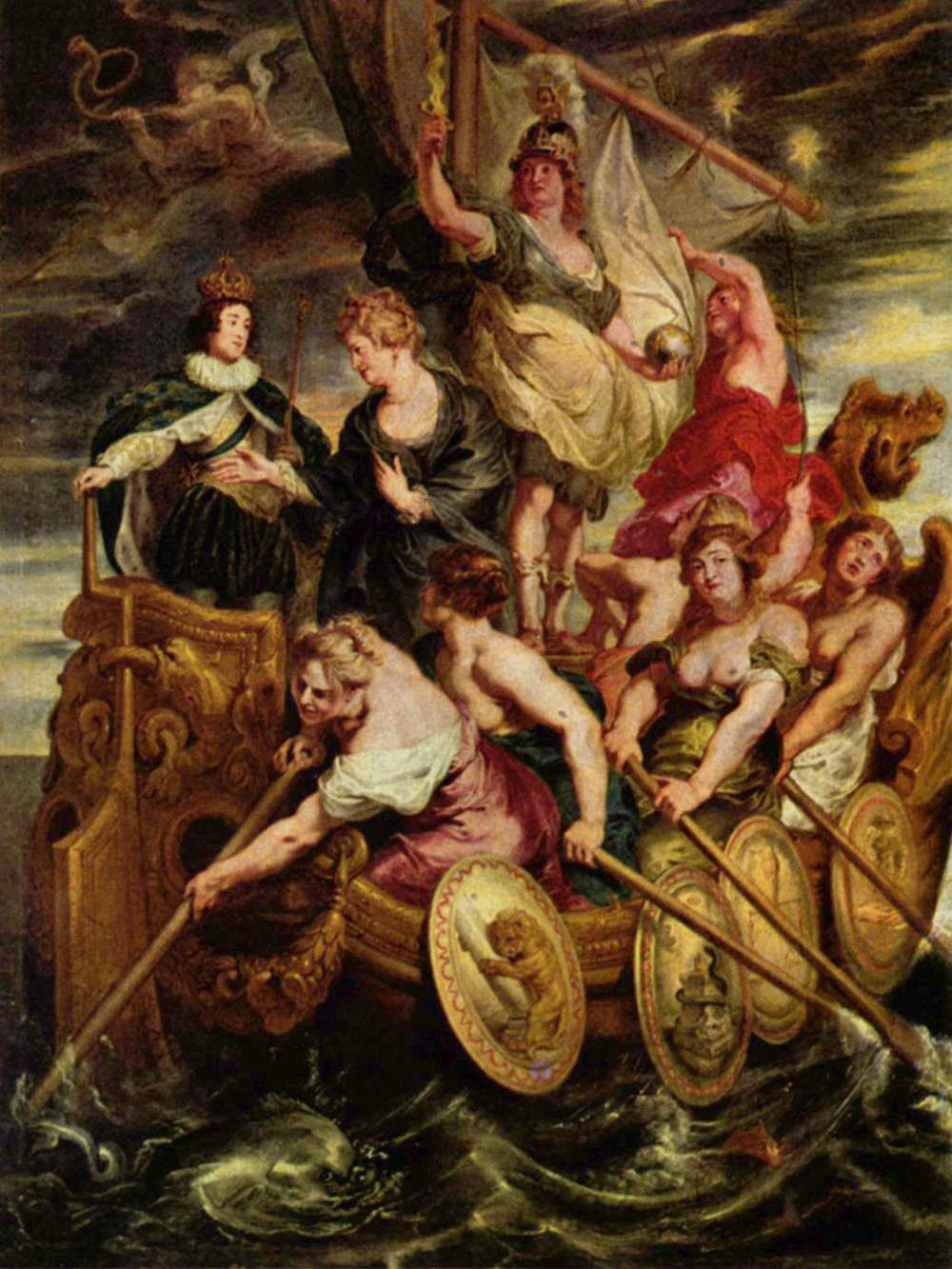
Louis XIII Comes of Age

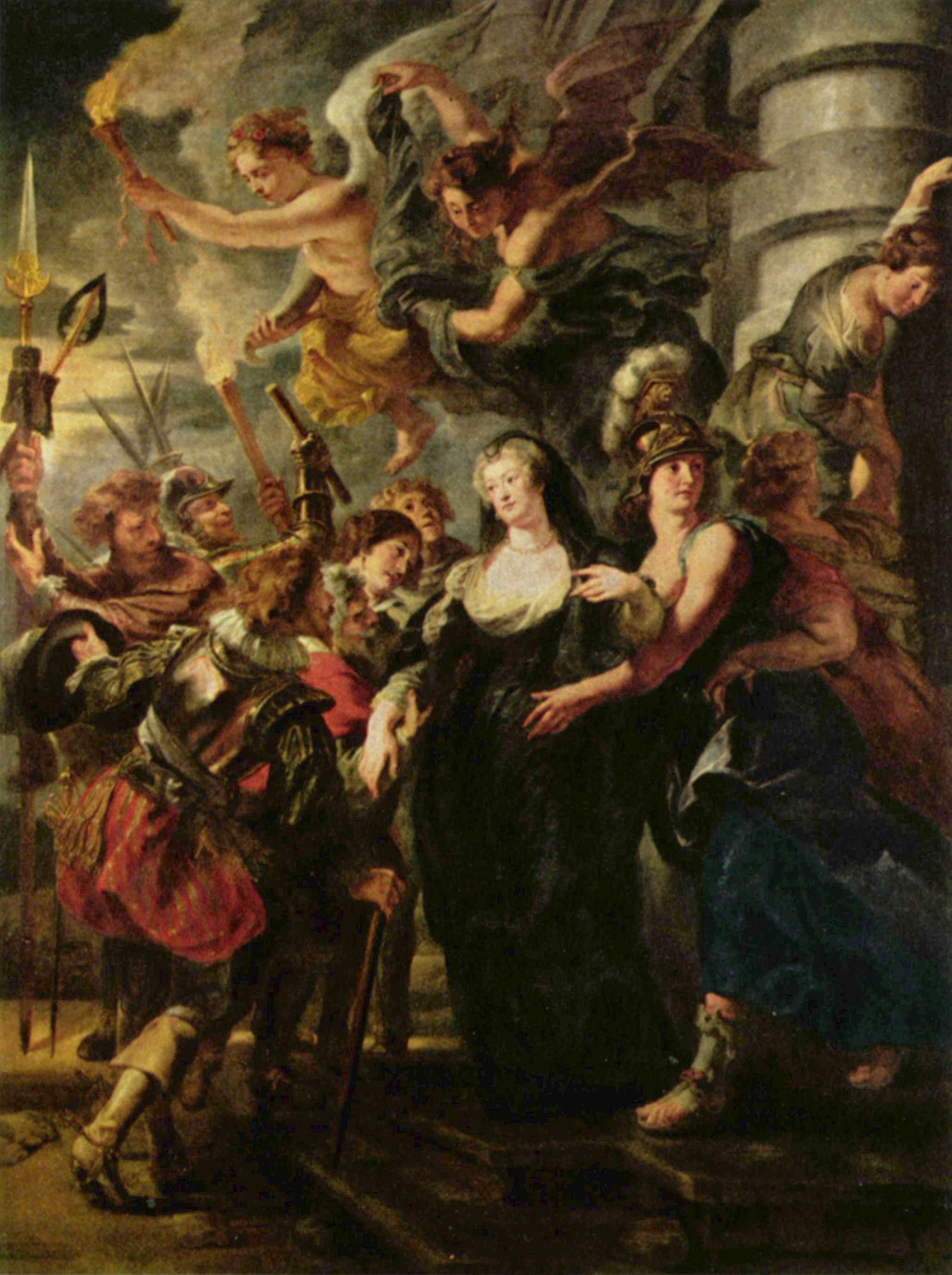
The Flight from Blois

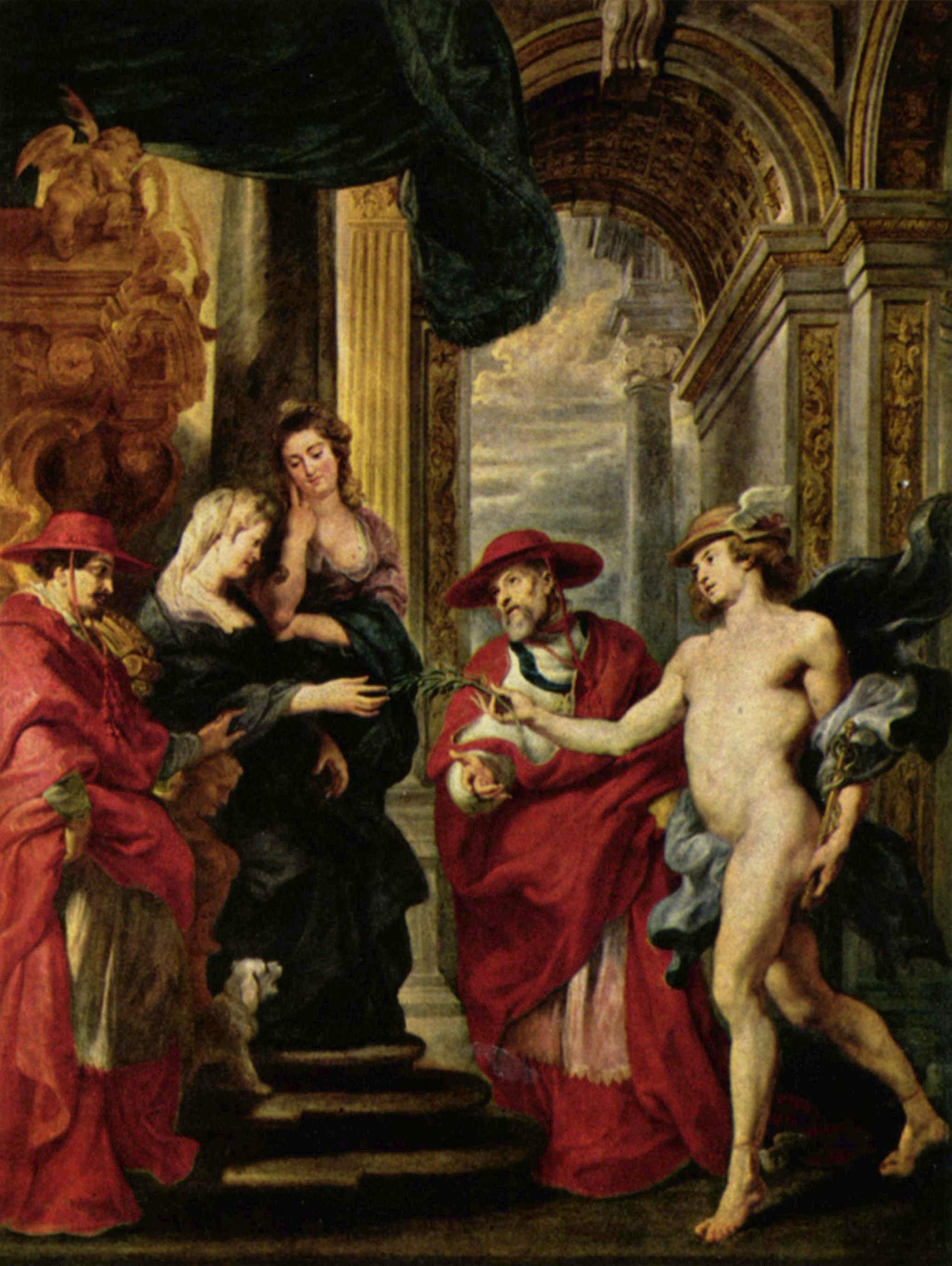
The Negotiations at Angoulême

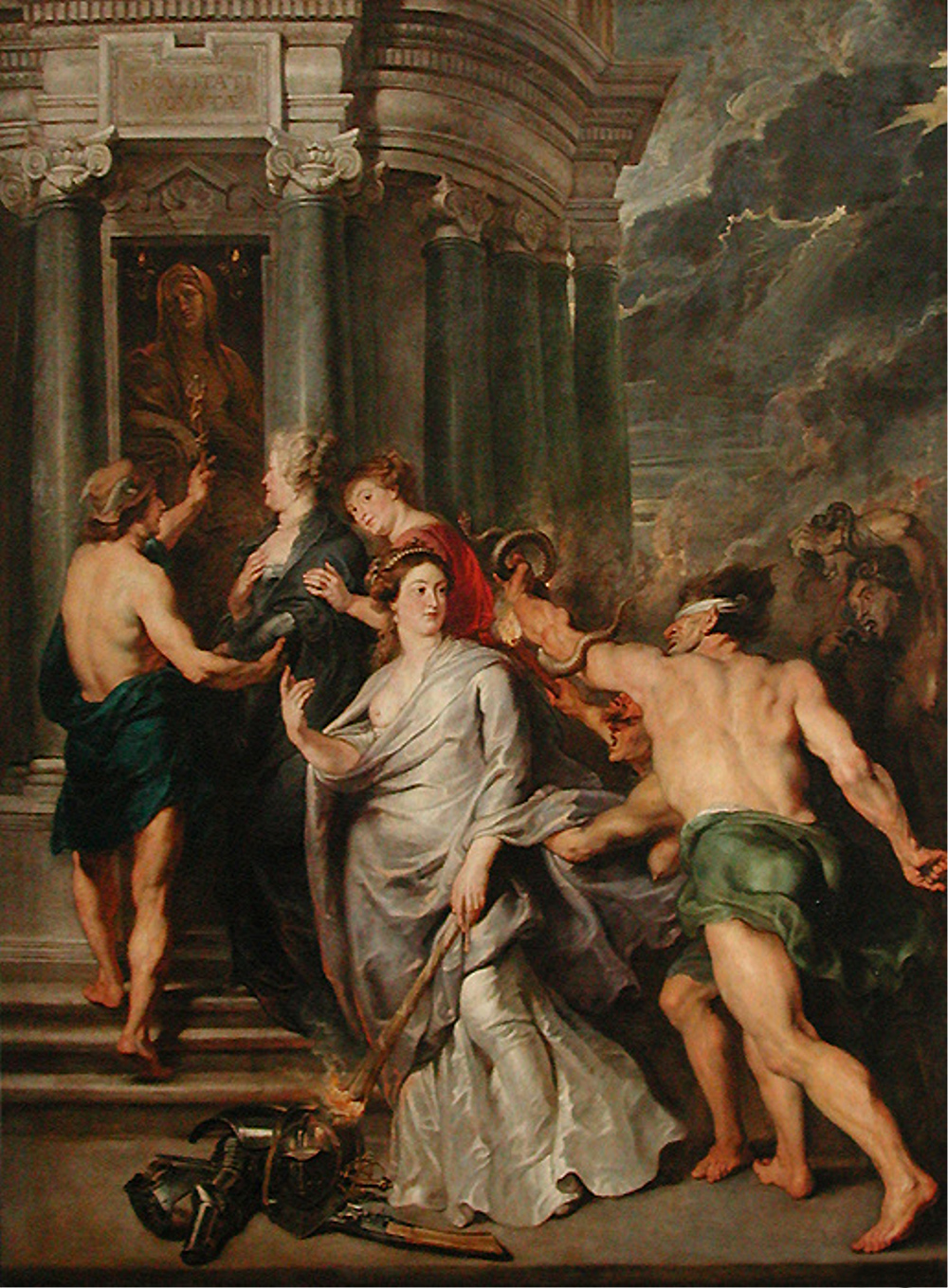
The Queen Opts for Security

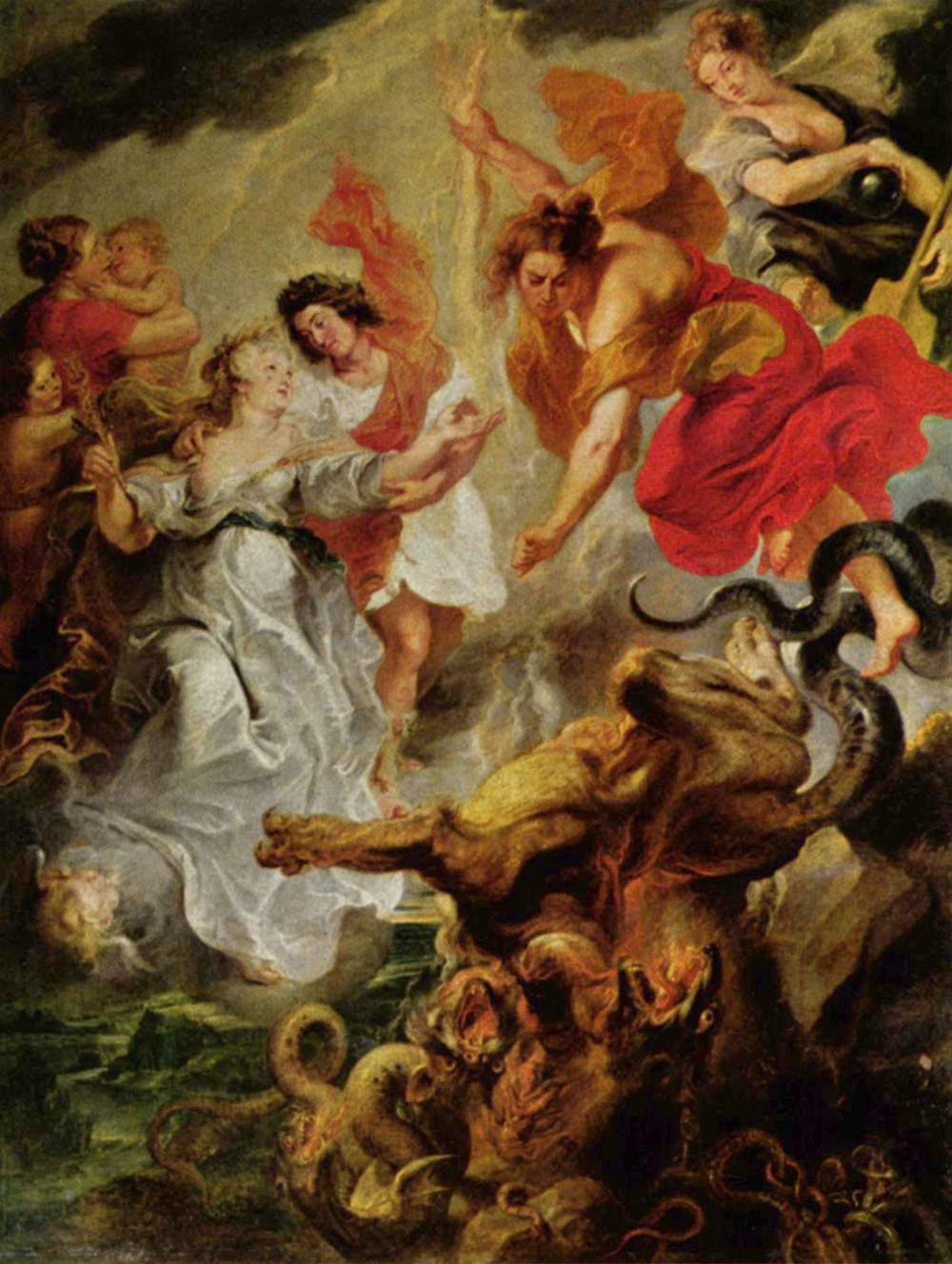
The Reconciliation: of the Queen and her son

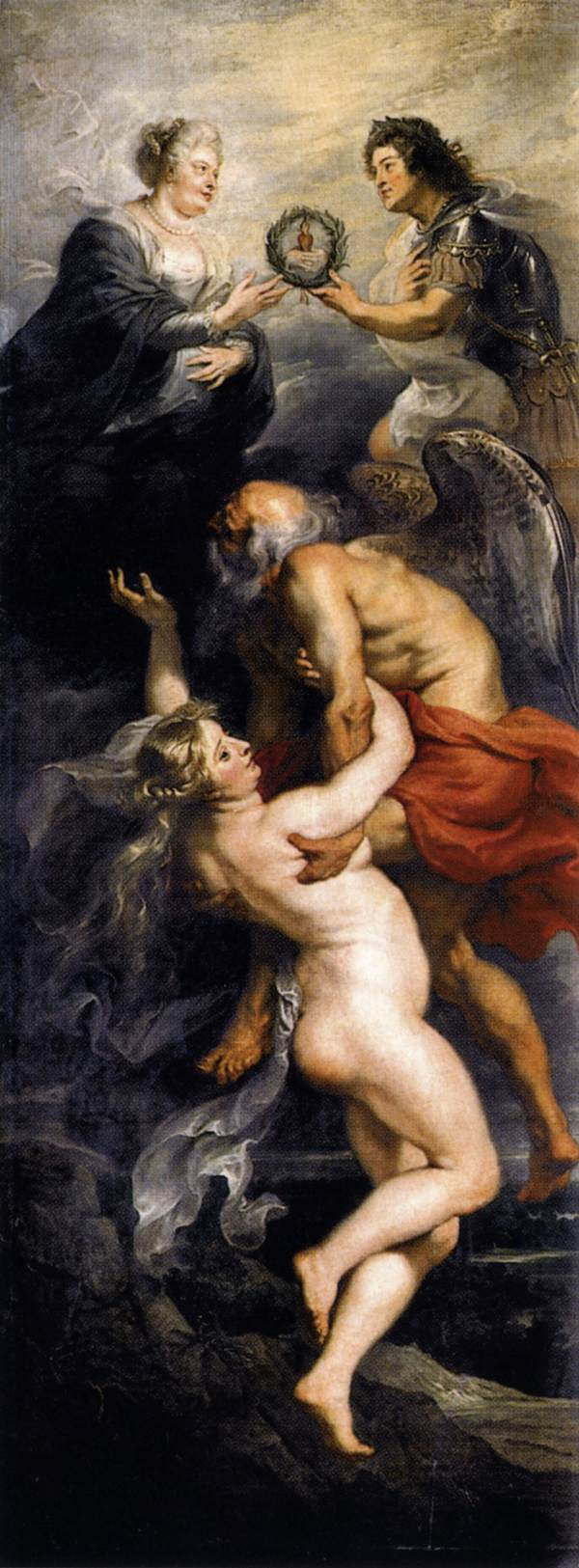
The Triumph of Truth

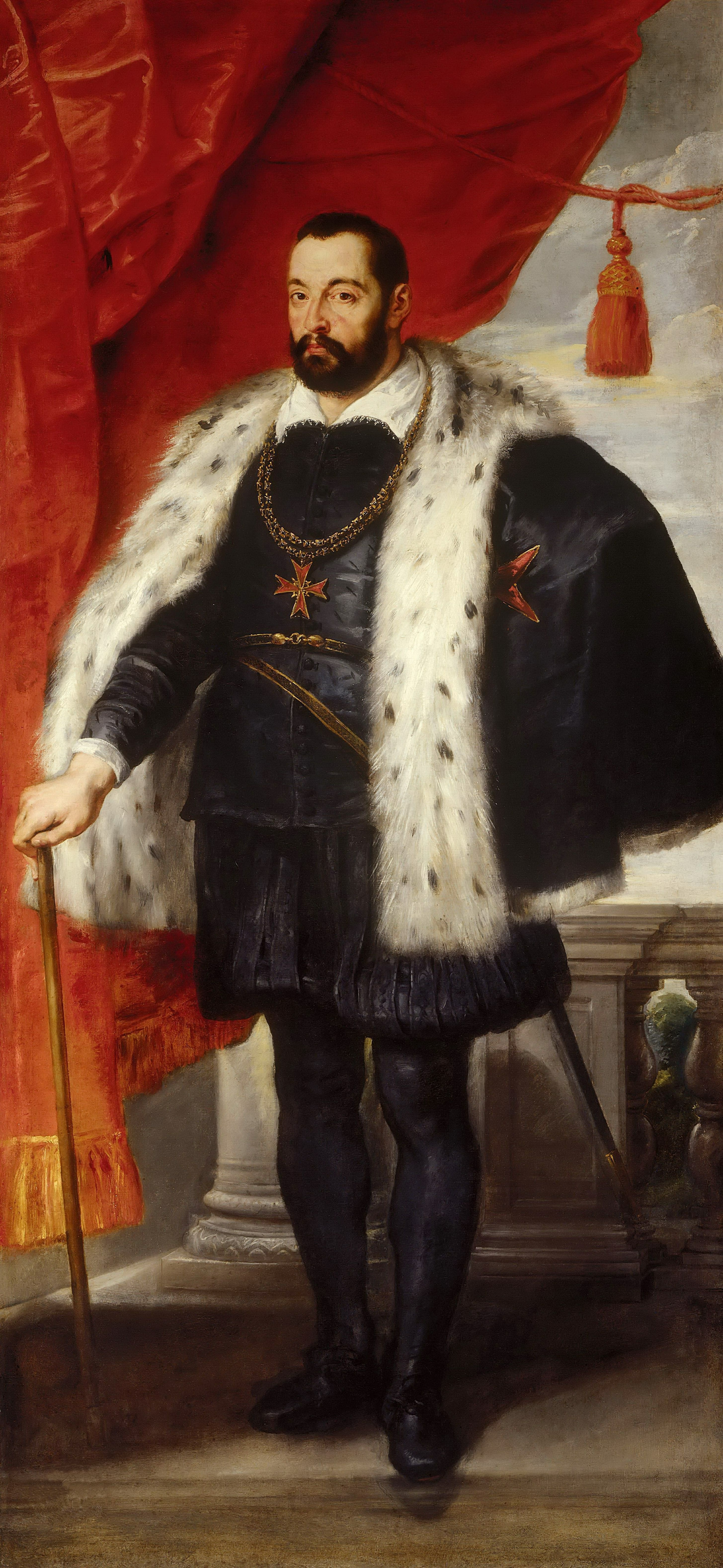
Francesco I de' Medici, Grand Duke of Tuscany

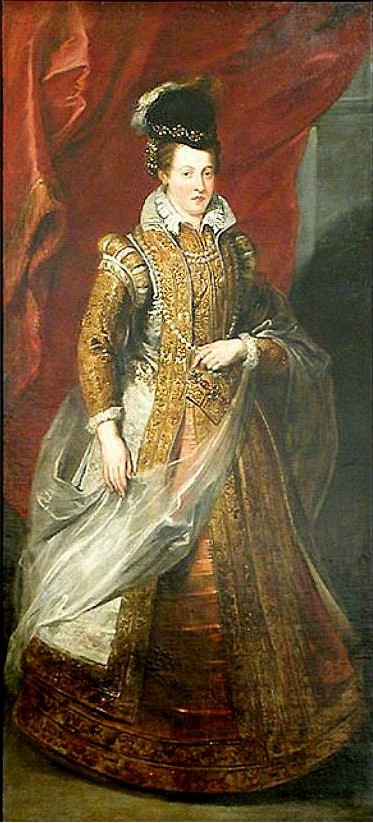
Joanna of Austria, Grand Duchess of Tuscany

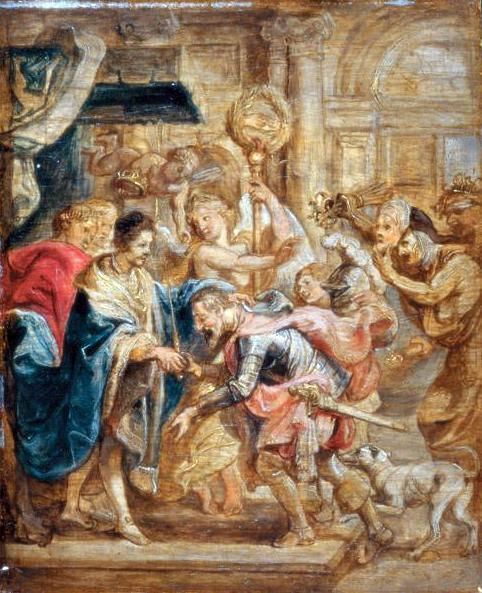
The Reconciliation of King Henry III and Henry of Navarre

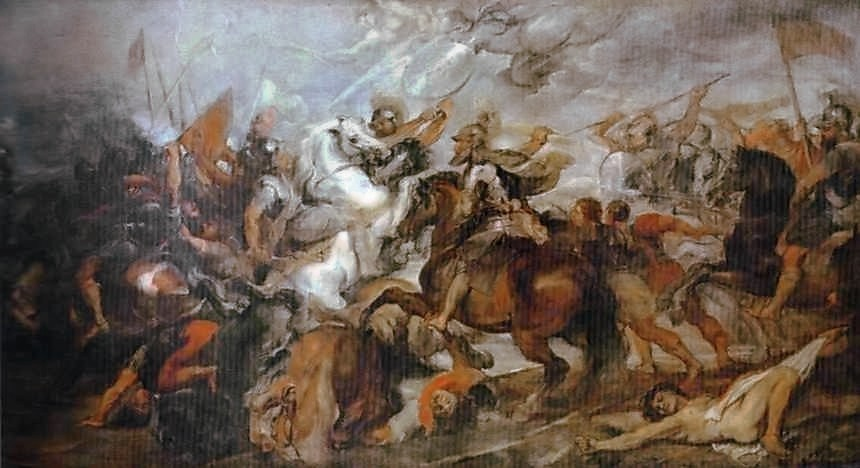
The Battle of Ivry

== Sources ==
External videos
- Rubens's Arrival (or Disembarkation) of Marie de Medici at Marseilles, Medici Cycle, Smarthistory at Khan Academy

- Belkin, Kristin Lohse (1998). Rubens. Phaidon Press. ISBN 0-7148-3412-2.
- Berger, Robert W. (December 1972). "Rubens and Caravaggio: A Source for a Painting from the Medici Cycle". The Art Bulletin. 54 (4). College Art Association: 473–477. doi:10.2307/3049036. JSTOR 3049036.
- Cohen, Sarah R. (September 2003). "Rubens's France: Gender and Personification in the Marie de Médicis Cycle". Art Bulletin. 85 (3). The Art Bulletin, Vol. 85, No. 3: 490–522. doi:10.2307/3177384. JSTOR 3177384.
- Coolidge, John (1966). "Rubens and the Decoration of French Royal Galleries". The Art Bulletin. 48 (March 1966). College Art Association: 67–69. doi:10.2307/3048334. JSTOR 3048334.
- Downes, Kerry (June 1983). "Rubens's Prices". The Burlington Magazine. 125: 362.
- Held, Julius (1980). 17th and 18th Century Art. Prentice-Hall, Inc. ISBN 0-13-807339-2.
- Held, Julius S. (1980). "The Oil Sketches of Peter Paul Rubens". A Critical Catalogue. 1. Princeton University Press: 123–133.
- Janson, H. W. (2007). Janson's History of Art: the western tradition 7th ed. Prentice Hall. ISBN 978-0-13-193455-9.
- Millen, Ronald; Wolf, Robert Erich (1989). Heroic Deeds and Mystic Figures: a New Reading of Rubens' Life of Maria De' Medici. Princeton University Press. ISBN 0-691-04065-6.
- Saward, Susan (1982). The Golden Age of Marie de' Medici. Studies in Baroque Art History, no. 2. UMI Research Press. ISBN 0-8357-1307-5.
- Smith, Shaw (October 1992). "Rubens and the Grand Camee de France". Gazette des Beaux-Arts. vi, 120: 127–136.
- Sutton, Peter C. & Wieseman, Marjorie E. (2004). Drawn by the Brush, Oil Sketches by Peter Paul Rubens. Yale University Press. pp. 192–195.
- Stockstad, Marilyn (2005). "Henry IV, Receiving Portrait of Marie de' Medici". In Stockstad, Marilyn (ed.). Art History, Revised Second Edition, Volume Two. Pearson. pp. 760–761. ISBN 0-13-145529-X.
- Vlieghe, Hans (1998). Flemish Art and Architecture 1585 - 1700. Yale University Press. ISBN 0-300-07038-1.
- Wedgwood, C.V., ed. (1967). The World of Rubens 1577-1640. Time Inc. pp. 103, 116.
- Winner, Matthias (1998). "The Orb as the Symbol of the State". In Ellenius, Allan (ed.). Iconography, Propaganda, and Legitimation: The Origins of the Modern State in Europe. Clarendon Press. pp. 63–86. ISBN 0-19-820550-3.
