= Tapestry =

Form of textile art, traditionally woven on a vertical loom

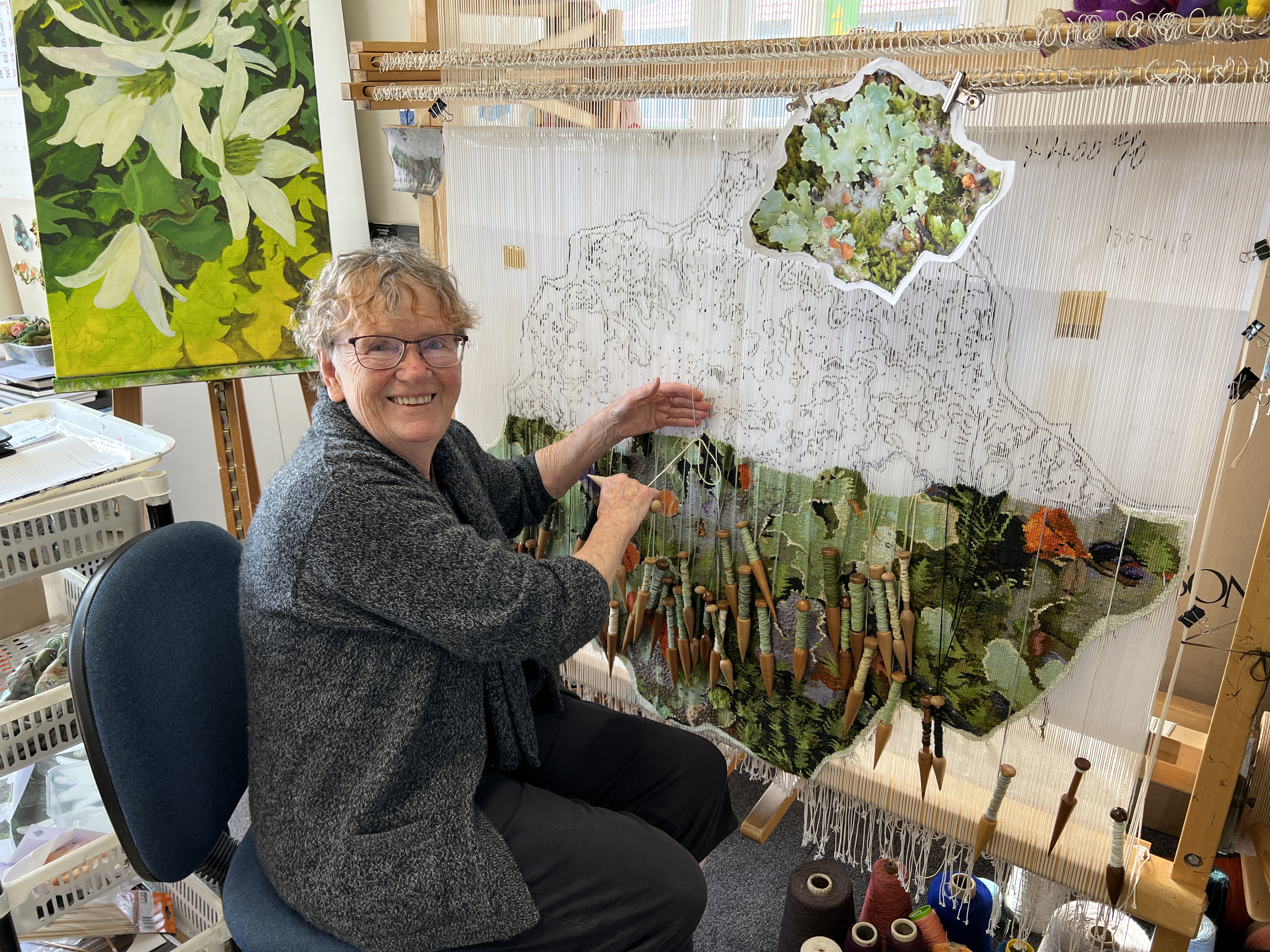
Weaving a small tapestry on a high-warp loom, 2022, New Zealand

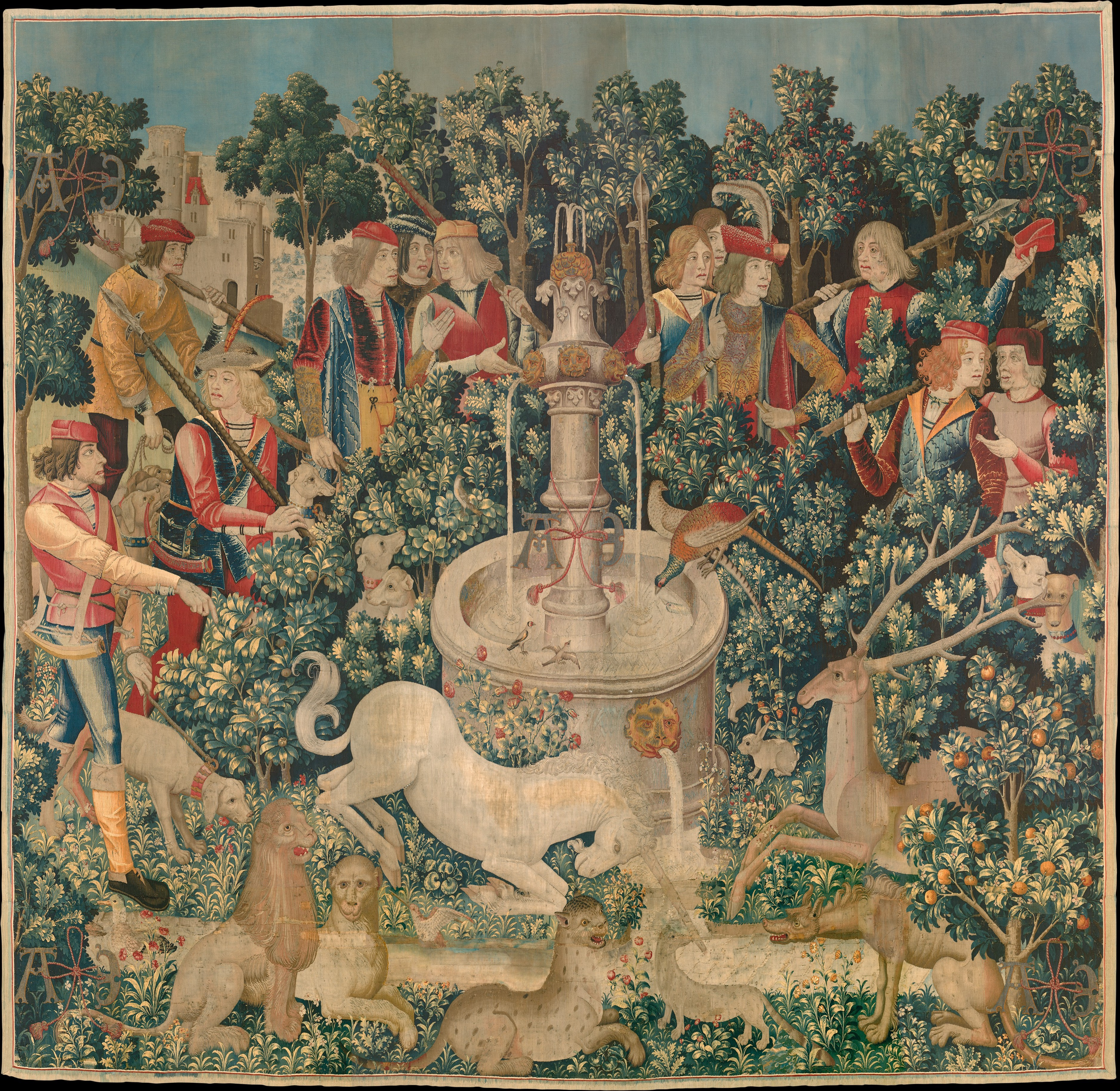
One of the tapestries in the series The Hunt of the Unicorn: The Unicorn is Found, circa 1495–1505, The Cloisters, Metropolitan Museum of Art, New York City

Tapestry is a form of textile art which was traditionally woven by hand on a loom. Normally it is used to create images rather than patterns. Tapestry is relatively fragile, and difficult to make, so most historical pieces are intended to hang vertically on a wall (or sometimes in tents), or sometimes to lie horizontally over a piece of furniture such as a table or bed. Some periods made smaller pieces, often long and narrow and used as borders for other textiles. Most weavers use a natural warp thread, such as wool, linen, or cotton. The weft threads are usually wool or cotton but may include silk, gold, silver, or other alternatives.

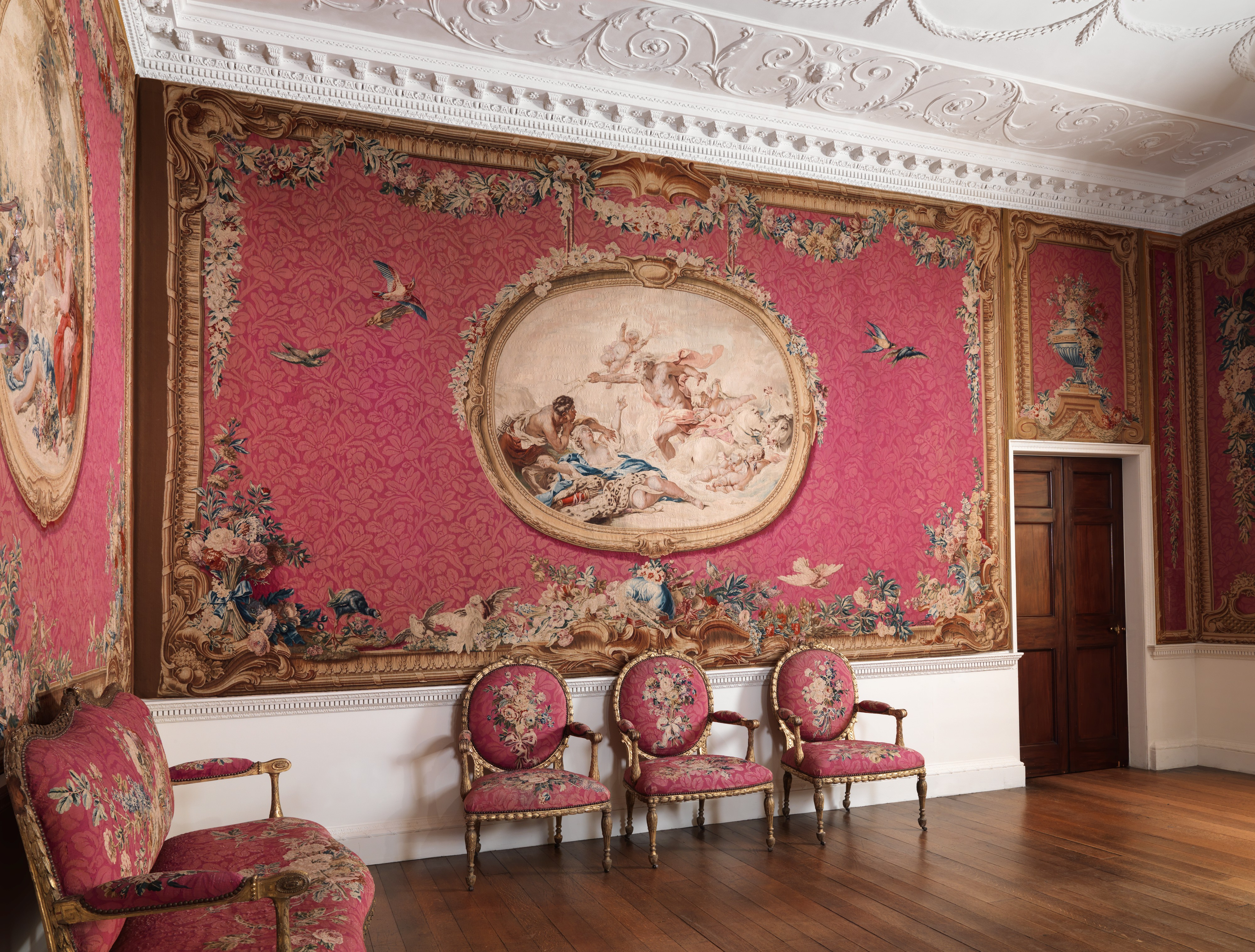
Tapestry Room from Croome Court, moved to the Metropolitan Museum of Art, hung with made to measure 18th-century Gobelins tapestries, also covering the chairs. 1763–71

In late medieval Europe, tapestry was the grandest and most expensive medium for figurative images in two dimensions, and despite the rapid rise in importance of painting it retained this position in the eyes of many Renaissance patrons until at least the end of the 16th century, if not beyond. The European tradition continued to develop and reflect wider changes in artistic styles until the French Revolution and Napoleonic Wars, before being revived on a smaller scale in the 19th century.

Technically, tapestry is weft-faced weaving, in which all the warp threads are hidden in the completed work, unlike most woven textiles, where both the warp and the weft threads may be visible. In tapestry weaving, weft yarns are typically discontinuous (unlike brocade); the artisan interlaces each coloured weft back and forth in its own small pattern area. It is a plain weft-faced weave having weft threads of different colours worked over portions of the warp to form the design. European tapestries are normally made to be seen only from one side, and often have a plain lining added on the back. However, other traditions, such as Chinese kesi and that of pre-Columbian Peru, make tapestry to be seen from both sides.

Tapestry should be distinguished from the different technique of embroidery, and other types of decorative needlework, although large pieces of embroidery with images are sometimes loosely called "tapestry", as with the famous Bayeux Tapestry, which is in fact embroidered. From the Middle Ages on, European tapestries could be very large, with images containing dozens of figures. They were often made in sets, so that a whole room could be hung with them.

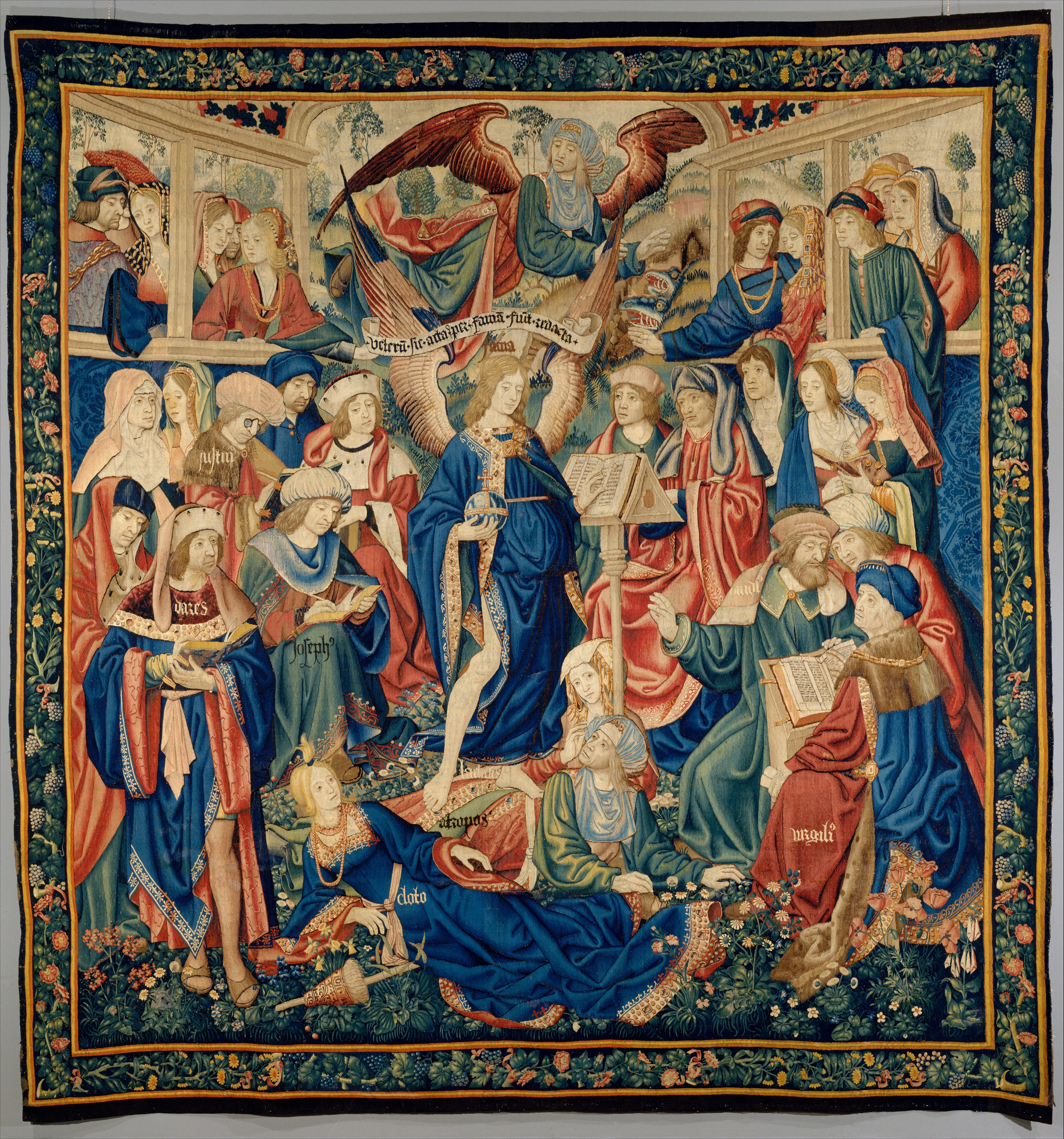
The Triumph of Fame, probably Brussels, 1500s

== Terms and etymology ==
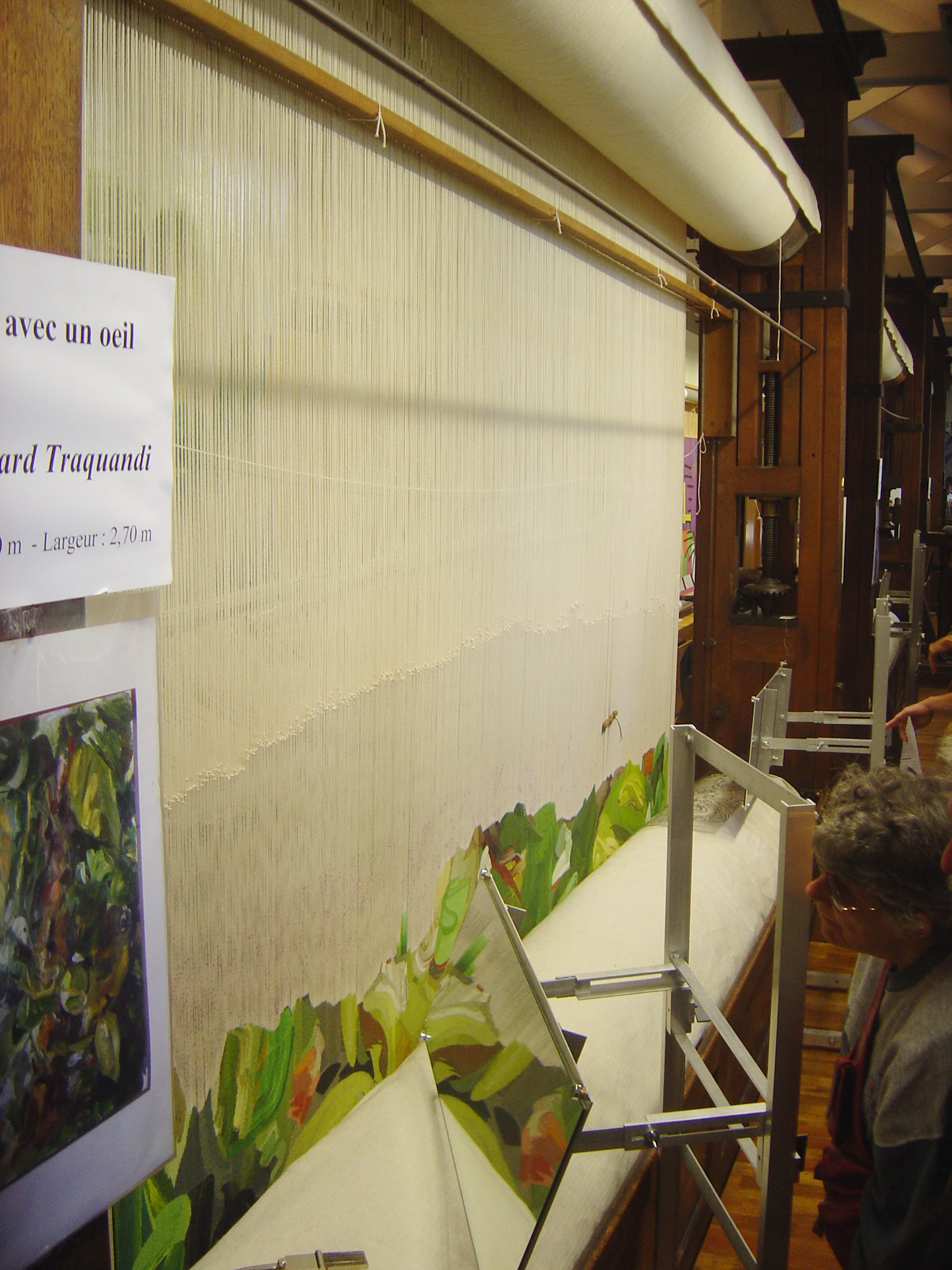
High-warp loom at the Gobelins factory with mirrors, so the weaver behind the web can follow their work (photo of low warp loom).

In English, "tapestry" has two senses, both of which apply to most of the works discussed here. Firstly it means work using the tapestry weaving technique described above and below, and secondly it means a rather large textile wall hanging with a figurative design. Some embroidered works, like the Bayeux Tapestry, meet the second definition but not the first. The situation is complicated by the French equivalent tapisserie also covering needlepoint work, which can lead to confusion, especially with pieces such as furniture covers, where both techniques are used.

According to the Oxford English Dictionary, the earliest use in English was in a will of 1434, mentioning a "Lectum meum de tapstriwerke cum leonibus cum pelicano". They give a wide definition, covering: "A textile fabric decorated with designs of ornament or pictorial subjects, painted, embroidered, or woven in colours, used for wall hangings, curtains, covers for seats, ..." before mentioning "especially" those woven in a tapestry weave.

The word tapestry derives from Old French tapisserie, from tapisser, meaning "to cover with heavy fabric, to carpet", in turn from tapis, "heavy fabric", via Latin tapes (gen: tapetis), which is the Latinisation of the Greek τάπης (tapēs; gen: τάπητος, tapētos), "carpet, rug". The earliest attested form of the word is the Mycenaean Greek 𐀲𐀟𐀊, ta-pe-ja, written in the Linear B syllabary.

"Tapestry" was not the common English term until near the end of the classic period for them. If not just called "hangings" or "cloths", they were known as "arras", from the period when Arras was the leading production centre. Arazzo is still the term for tapestry in Italian, while a number of European languages use variants based on Gobelins, after the French factory; for example both Danish and Hungarian use gobelin (and in Danish tapet means wallpaper). Thomas Campbell argues that in documents relating to the Tudor royal collection from 1510 onwards "arras" specifically meant tapestries using gold thread.

== Production ==
Tapestry is a type of weaving. Various designs of looms can be used, including upright or "high-warp" looms, where the tapestry is stretched vertically in front of the weaver, or horizontal "low-warp" looms, which were usual in large medieval and Renaissance workshops, but later mostly used for smaller pieces. The weaver always works on the back of the piece, and is normally following a full-size drawn or painted cartoon, or possibly another tapestry; depending on the set up, this reverses (is a mirror image of) the tapestry image. The cartoon was generally created from a smaller modello, which in "industrial" workshops from at least the late Middle Ages on was produced by a professional artist, who often had little or no further involvement in the process. The cartoon was traced onto the warp lines by the weaver, and then placed where it could still be seen, sometimes through a mirror, when it hung behind the weaver. With low-warp looms the cartoon was usually cut into strips and placed beneath the weaving, where the weaver could see it through the "web" of threads. The Raphael Cartoons, which are very rare examples of surviving cartoons, were cut in this way.

In European "industrial" tapestries the warp threads were normally wool, but in more artisanal settings, and older ones, linen was often used. The weft threads were wool, with silk, silver or gold thread used in the most expensive tapestries. Some famous designs, such as the Sistine Chapel tapestries and the Story of Abraham set probably first made for King Henry VIII, survive in versions with precious metals and other versions without. Using silk might increase the cost by four times, and adding gold thread increased the cost enormously, to perhaps fifty times that of wool alone.

The weavers were usually male, as the work was physically demanding; spinning the threads was usually a female preserve. Apart from the design and materials, the quality of tapestries varies with the tightness of the weaving. One modern measure of this is the number of warp threads per centimetre. It is estimated that a single weaver could produce a square yard of medium quality tapestry in a month, but only half that of the finest quality.

== Function ==
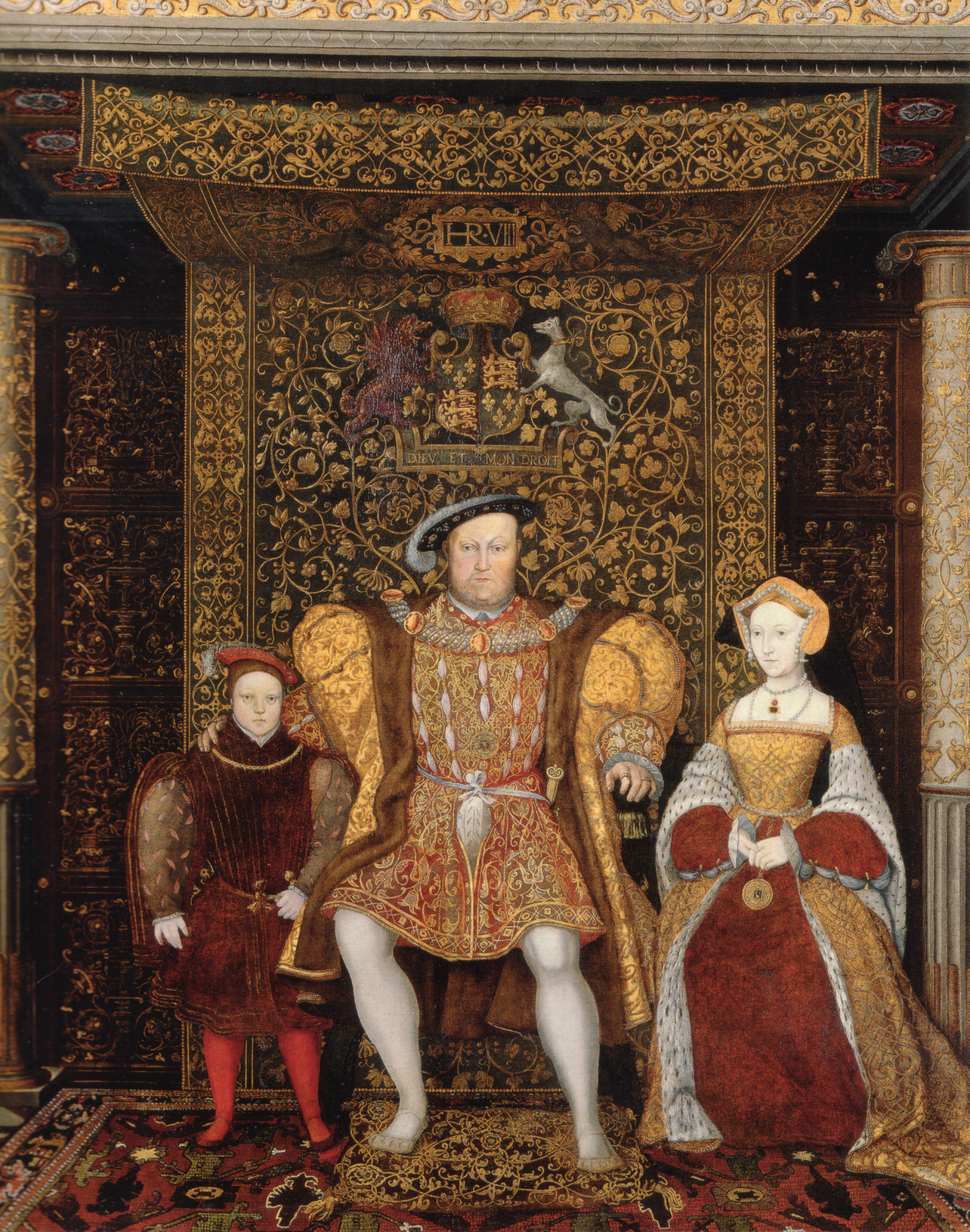
King Henry VIII seated beneath a tapestry cloth of state

The success of decorative tapestry can be partially explained by its portability (Le Corbusier once called tapestries "nomadic murals"). The fully hand-woven tapestry form is more suitable for creating new figurative designs than other types of woven textile, and the looms could be much larger. Kings and noblemen could fold up and transport tapestries from one residence to another. Many kings had "wardrobe" departments with their own buildings devoted to the care, repair, and movement of tapestries, which were folded into large canvas bags and carried on carts. In churches, they were displayed on special occasions. Tapestries were also draped on the walls of palaces and castles for insulation during winter, as well as for decorative display. For special ceremonial processions such as coronations, royal entries and weddings, they would sometimes be displayed outside. The largest and best tapestries, designed for more public spaces in palaces, were only displayed on special occasions, reducing wear and fading. Presumably the smaller personal rooms were hung permanently.

Many smaller pieces were made as covers for furniture or cushions, or curtains and bed hangings. Others, especially in the case of those made for patrons outside the top of the elite, were cut up and reused for such functions when they, or tapestries in general, came to seem old-fashioned. Bags, and sometimes clothing were other re-uses. The Beauvais Manufactory became rather a specialist in furniture upholstery, which enabled it to survive after the French Revolution when this became the main remaining market. In the case of tapestries with precious metal thread, they might be burned to recover the metal, as Charles V's soldiers did to some of the Sistine Chapel tapestries, and the French Directory government did in the 1790s to most of the royal collection from the Renaissance.

In the Middle Ages and the Renaissance, a rich tapestry panel woven with symbolic emblems, mottoes, or coats of arms called a baldachin, canopy of state or cloth of state was hung behind and over a throne as a symbol of authority. The seat under such a canopy of state would normally be raised on a dais.

As paintings came to be regarded as more important works of art, typically by the 17th century, tapestries in palaces were moved less, and came to be regarded as more or less permanent fittings for a particular room. It was at this point that many old tapestries were cut to allow fitting around doors and windows. They also often suffered the indignity of having paintings hung on top of them. Some new tapestries were made to fit around a specific room; the design of the Gobelins set from Croome Court, now in New York, has a large field with an ornamental design that could easily be adjusted in size to fit the measurements of the customer's room.

== Early history ==
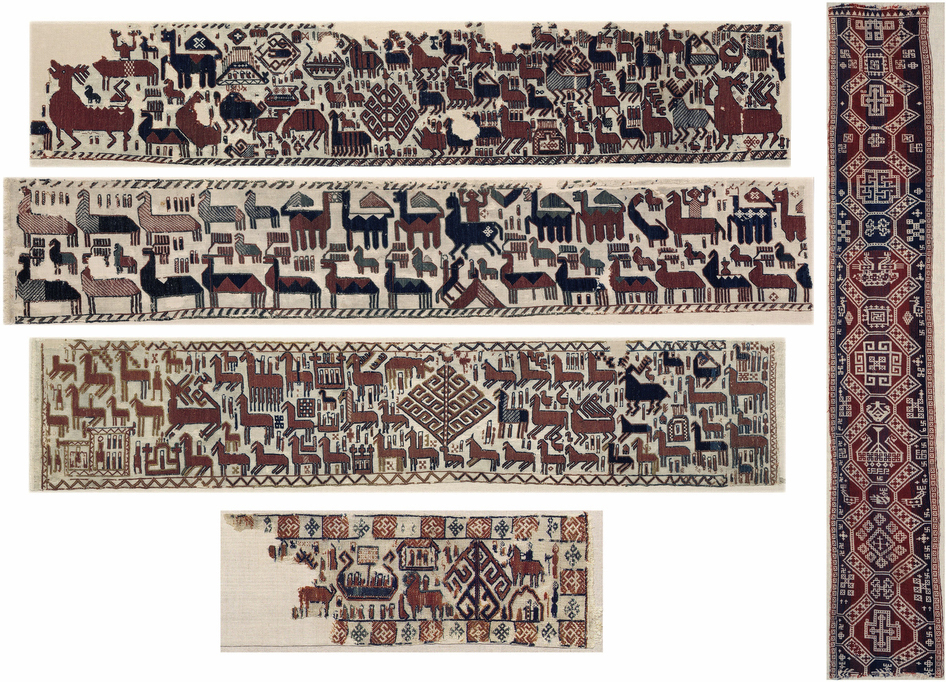
The five Överhogdal tapestries

=== Ancient ===
Much is unclear about the early history of tapestry, as actual survivals are very rare, and literary mentions in Greek, Roman and other literature almost never give enough detail to establish that a tapestry technique is being described. From ancient Egypt, tapestry weave pieces using linen were found in the tombs of both Thutmose IV (d. 1391 or 1388 BC) and Tutankhamen (c. 1323 BC), the latter a glove and a robe.

Pieces in wool, given a wide range of dates around two millennia ago, have been found in a cemetery at Sanpul (Shampula) and other sites near Khotan in the Tarim Basin. They appear to have been made in a variety of places, including the Hellenistic world. The largest fragments, known as the Sampul tapestry and probably Hellenistic in origin, apparently came from a large wall-hanging, but had been reused to make a pair of trousers.

=== Early and High medieval ===
The Hestia Tapestry from Byzantine Egypt around 500–550, is a largely intact wool piece with many figures around the enthroned goddess Hestia, who is named in Greek letters. It is 114 x 136.5 cm (44.9 x 53.7 inches) with a rounded top, and was presumably hung in a home, showing the persistence of Greco-Roman paganism at this late date. The Cleveland Museum of Art has a comparable enthroned Virgin Mary of similar date. Many of the small borders and patches with images with which the early Byzantine world liked to decorate their clothing were in tapestry.

A number of survivals from around the year 1000 show the development of a frieze shape, of a large long tapestry that is relatively short in height. These were apparently designed to hang around a hall or church, probably rather high; surviving examples have nearly all been preserved in churches, but may originally have been secular. The Cloth of Saint Gereon, from around 1000, has a repeat pattern centred on medallions with a motif of a bull being attacked by a griffin, taken from Byzantine silk (or its Persian equivalent) but probably woven locally in the Rhineland. It survived in St. Gereon's Basilica, Cologne, Germany, but is fragmentarily distributed across several museum collections today (see: Cloth of Saint Gereon).

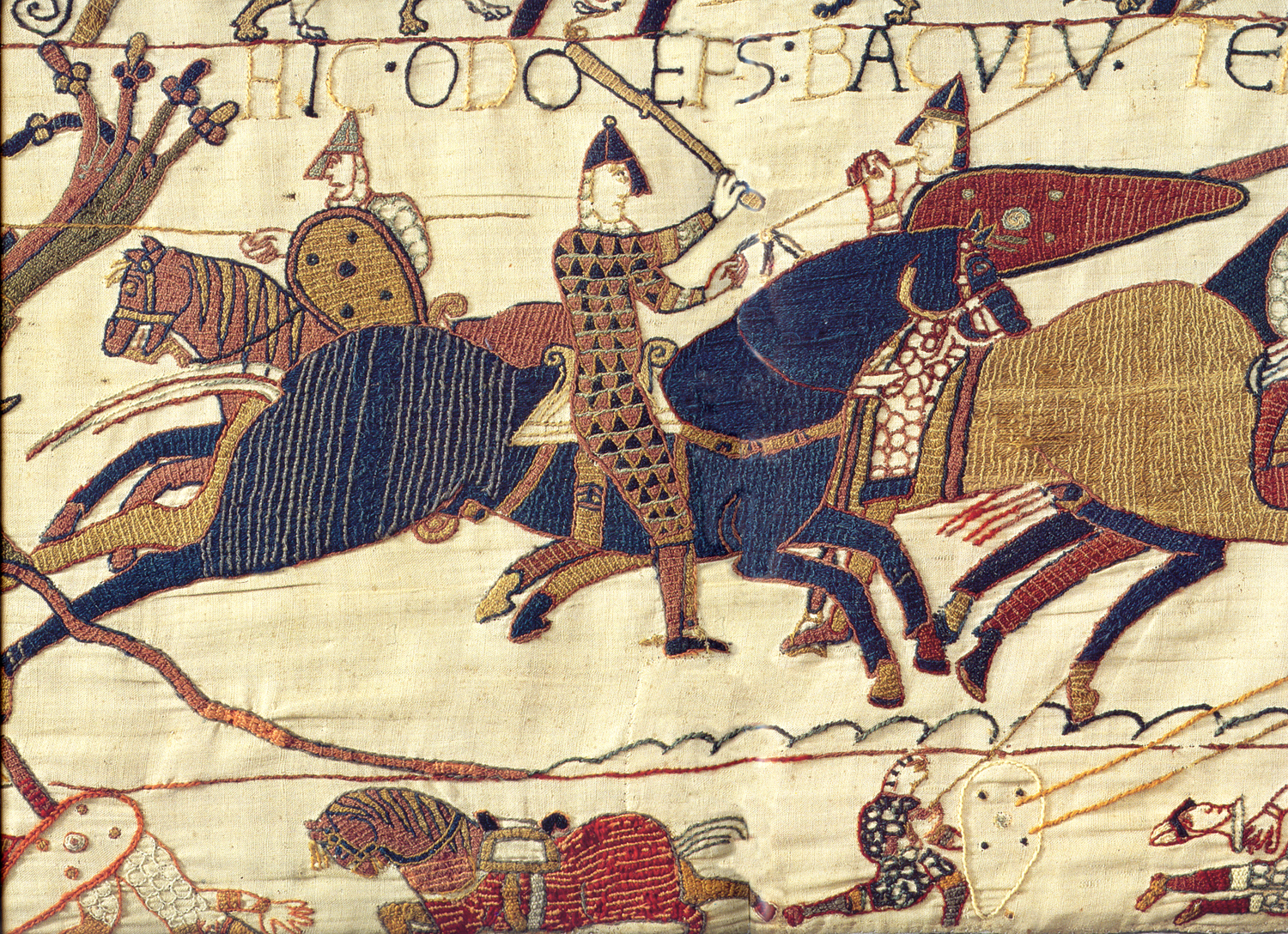
A scene from the Bayeux Tapestry depicting Odo, Bishop of Bayeux, rallying Duke William's troops during the Battle of Hastings in 1066

The five strips of Överhogdal tapestries, from Sweden and dated to within 70 years of 1100, have designs in which animals greatly outnumber human figures, and have been given various interpretations. One strip has geometrical motifs. The Skog tapestry, also from Sweden but probably early 14th-century, is comparable in style.

The most famous frieze hanging is the Bayeux Tapestry, actually an Embroidery, which is 68.38 metres long and 0.5 metres wide (224.3 ft × 1.6 ft) and would have been even longer originally. This was made in England, probably in the 1070s, and the narrative of the Norman Conquest of England in 1066 is very clear, explained by tituli in Latin. This may have been an Anglo-Saxon genre, as the Liber Eliensis records that the widow of the Anglo-Saxon commander Byrhtnoth gave Ely Abbey a tapestry or hanging celebrating his deeds, presumably in the style of the Bayeux Tapestry, the only surviving example of such a work. This was given immediately after his death in 991 at the Battle of Maldon, so had probably been hanging in his home previously.

A group with narrative religious scenes in a clearly Romanesque style that relates to Rhineland illuminated manuscripts of the same period was made for Halberstadt Cathedral in Germany around 1200, and shaped differently to fit specific spaces. These may well have been made by nuns, or the secular canonesses of nearby Quedlinburg Abbey.

In this period repeated decorative motifs, increasingly often heraldic, and comparable to the styles of imported luxury fabrics such as Byzantine silk, seem to have been the common designs. Of the tapestries mentioned above, the Cloth of St Gereon best represents this style.

== Peak period, after about 1350 ==
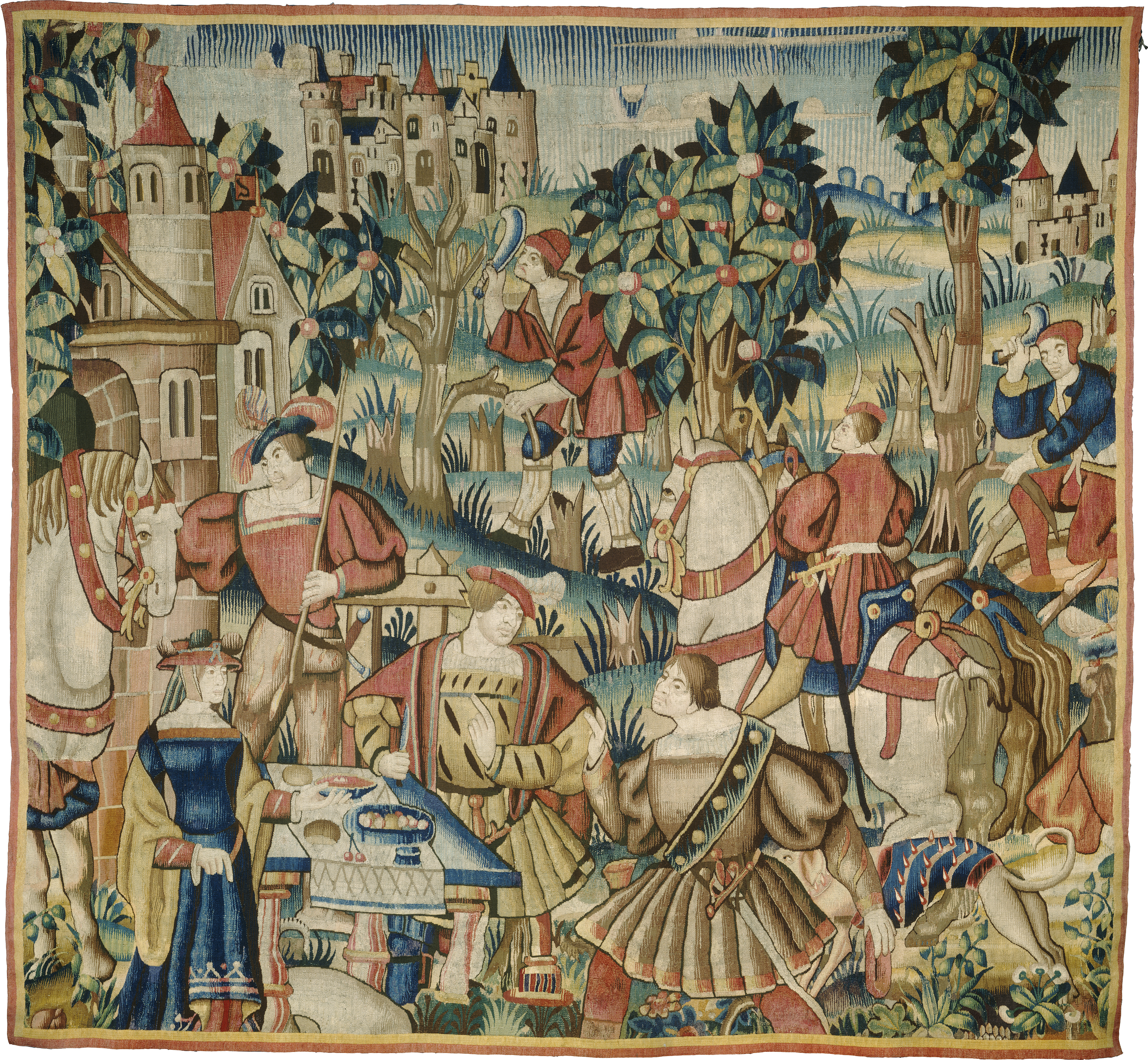
Flemish 16th Century, The Return from the Hunt, c. 1525–1550, National Gallery of Art

A decisive shift in European tapestry history came around 1350, and in many respects set the pattern for the industry until the end of its main period of importance, in the upheavals following the French Revolution. The tapestries made for the very small number of customers able to commission the best pieces were now extremely large, and extremely expensive, very often made in sets, and often showed complicated narrative or allegorical scenes with large numbers of figures. They were made in large workshops concentrated in a number of cities in a relatively small region of northern France and the Southern Netherlands (partly to be near supplies of English wool). By convention all these are often called "Flemish tapestries", although most of the production centres were not in fact in the County of Flanders.

Before reaching the weaving workshop, the commissioning process typically involved a patron, an artist, and a merchant or dealer who sorted out the arrangements and contracts. Some tapestries seem to have been made for stock, before a customer had emerged. The financing of the considerable costs of setting up a workshop is often obscure, especially in the early period, but rulers supported some workshops, or other wealthy people. The merchants or dealers were very likely also involved.

=== Weaving centres ===
Where surviving tapestries from before around 1600 were made is often unclear; from 1528 Brussels, by then clearly the main centre, required its weavers to mark tapestries of any size with the city's mark and that of the weaver or merchant. At any one time from 1350 to 1600 probably only one or two centres could produce the largest and finest royal orders, and groups of highly skilled weavers migrated to new centres, often driven to move by wars or the plague. At first Paris led the field, but the English occupation there after 1418 sent many to Arras, already a centre. Arras in turn was sacked in 1477, leading to the rise of Tournai, until a serious plague early in the next century. Brussels had been growing in importance, and now became the most important centre, which it remained until the Eighty Years War disrupted all the Netherlands. Brussels had a revival in the early 17th century, but from around 1650 the French factories were increasingly overtaking it, and remained dominant until both fashion and the upheavals of the French Revolution and the Napoleonic Wars brought the virtual end of the traditional demand for large tapestries.

There was always some tapestry weaving, mostly in rather smaller workshops making smaller pieces, in other towns in northern France and the Low Countries. This was also the case in other parts of Europe, especially Italy and Germany. From the mid-16th century many rulers encouraged or directly established workshops capable of high-quality work in their domains. This was most successful in France, but Tuscany, Spain, England and eventually Russia had high-quality workshops, normally beginning with the importation of a group of skilled workers from the "Flemish" centres.

=== Patrons ===
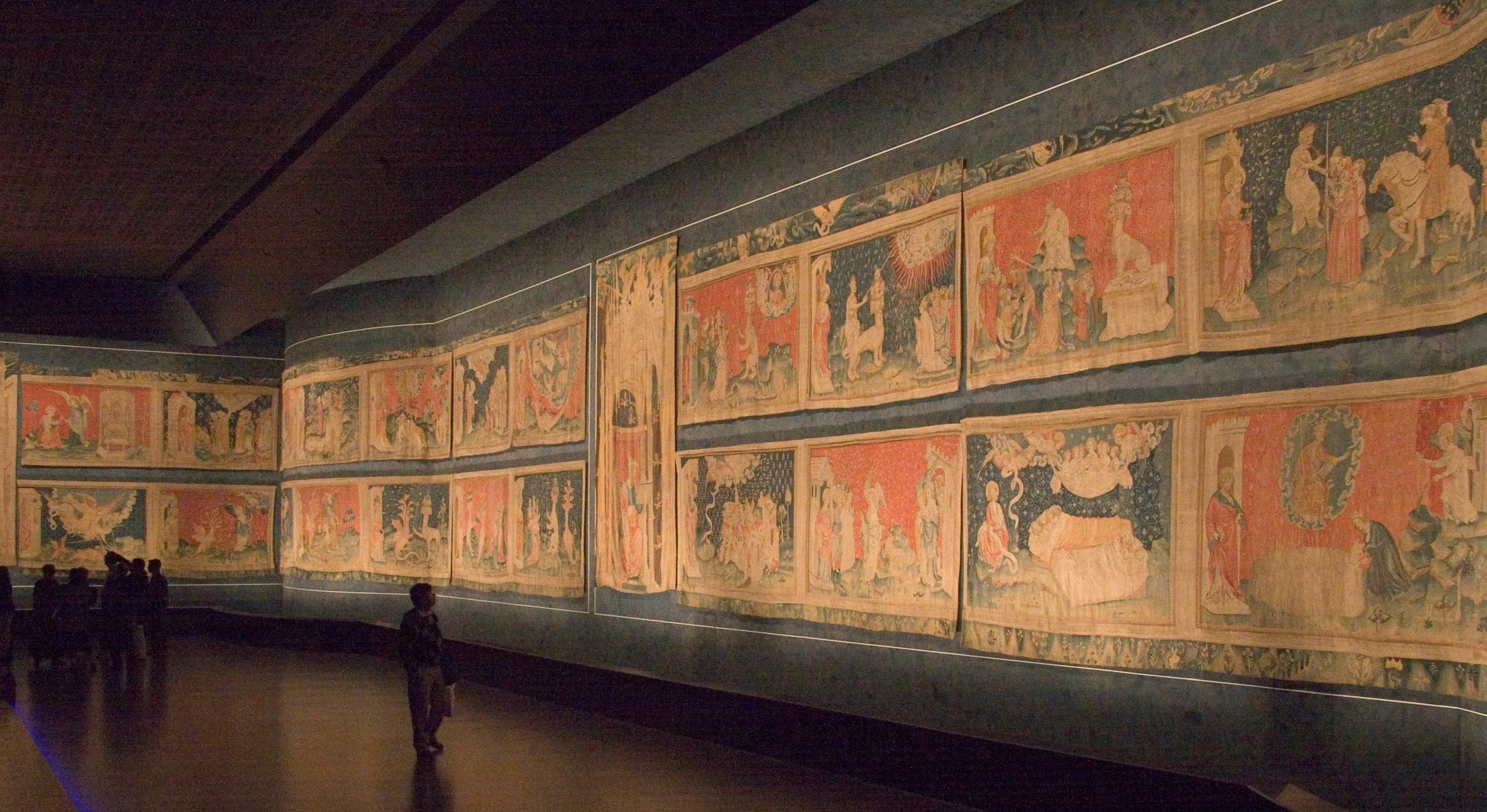
The Apocalypse Tapestry in the Château d'Angers, in Angers, France

The main weaving centres were ruled by the French and Burgundian branches of the House of Valois, who were extremely important patrons in the Late Medieval period. This began with the four sons of John II of France (d. 1362), whose inventories reveal they owned hundreds of tapestries between them. Almost the only clear survival from these collections, and the most famous tapestry from the 14th century, is the huge Apocalypse Tapestry, a very large set made for Louis I, Duke of Anjou in Paris between 1377 and 1382.

Another of the brothers, Philip the Bold, Duke of Burgundy (d. 1404) was probably an even more extravagant spender, and presented many tapestries to other rulers around Europe. Several of the tapestry-weaving centres were in his territories, and his gifts can be seen as a rather successful attempt to spread the taste for large Flemish tapestries to other courts, as well as being part of his attempt to promote the status of his duchy. Apart from Burgundy and France, tapestries were given to several of the English Plantagenets, and the rulers of Austria, Prussia, Aragon, Milan, and at his specific request, to the Ottoman Sultan Bazajet I (as part of a ransom deal for the duke's son). None of the tapestries Philip commissioned appear to survive. Philip's taste for tapestries was to continue very strongly in his descendants, including the Spanish Habsburgs.

== Subjects and style ==
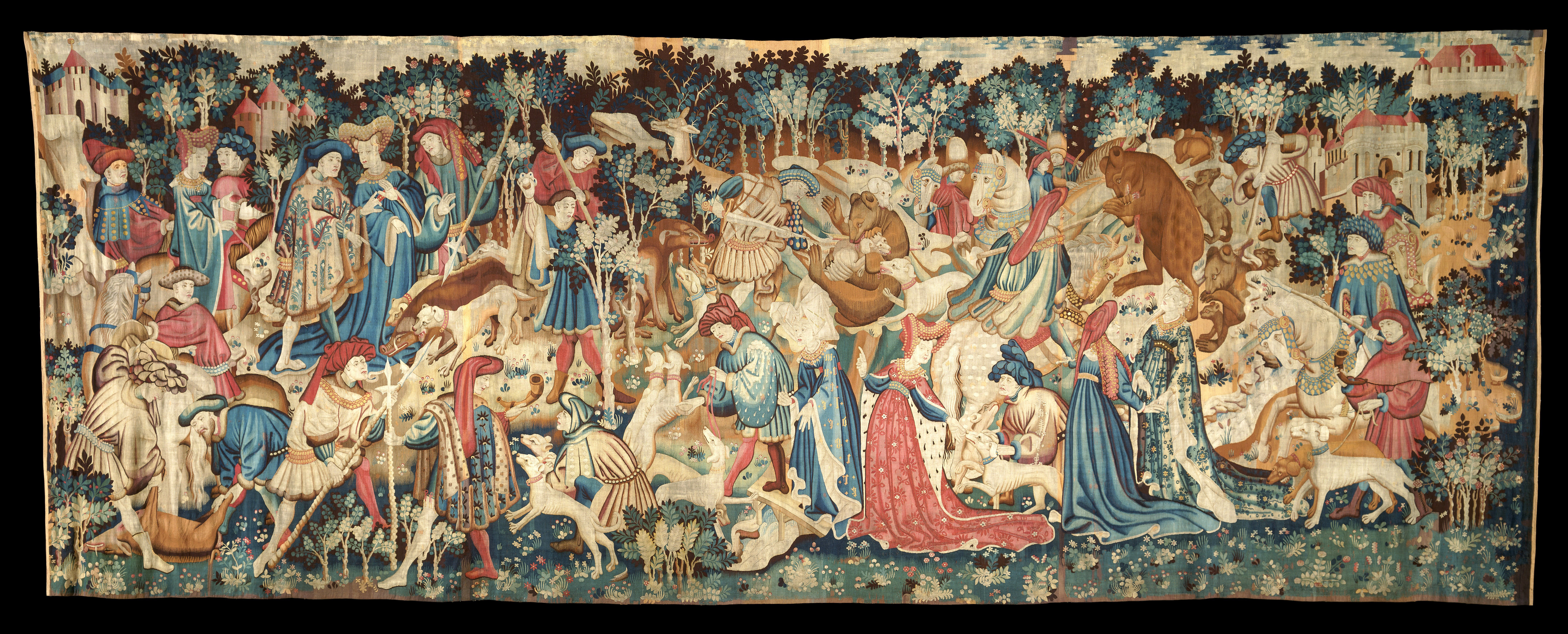
Boar and Bear Hunt, one of the Devonshire Hunting Tapestries, 1430–1450, V&A. 380 x 1020 cm, weight 50 kg.

The new style of grand tapestries that were large and often in sets mostly showed subjects with large numbers of figures representing narrative subjects. The iconography of a high proportion of narrative tapestries goes back to written sources, the Bible and Ovid's Metamorphoses being two popular choices.

It is a feature of tapestry weaving, in contrast to painting, that weaving an area of the work containing only relatively plain areas of the composition, such as sky, grass or water, still involves a relatively large amount of slow and skilled work. This, together with the client's expectation of an effect of overpowering magnificence, and the remoteness of the main centres from Italian influence, led to northern compositions remaining crammed with figures and other details long after classicizing trends in Italian Renaissance painting had reduced the crowding in paintings.

An important challenge to the northern style was the arrival in Brussels, probably in 1516, of the Raphael Cartoons for the pope's Sistine Chapel commission of a grand set depicting the Acts of the Apostles. These were sent from Rome and used the latest monumental classicizing High Renaissance style, which was also reaching the north through prints.

=== Hunting ===
Hunting scenes were also very popular. These were usually given no specific setting, although sometimes the commissioner and other figures might be given portraits. The four Devonshire Hunting Tapestries (1430–1450, V&A), probably made in Arras, are perhaps the largest set of 15th-century survivals, showing the hunting of bears, boars, deer, swans, otters, and falconry. Very fashionably dressed ladies and gentlemen stroll around beside the slaughter. Another set, from after 1515, show a similar late-medieval style, although partly made with silk, so extra-expensive.

But the twelve pieces in Les Chasses de Maximilien (1530s, Louvre), made in Brussels for a Habsburg patron, show an advanced Renaissance compositional style adapted to tapestries. These have a hunting scene for each month in the year, and also show specific locations around the city. Goya was still designing hunting scenes in the 1770s.

=== Military ===
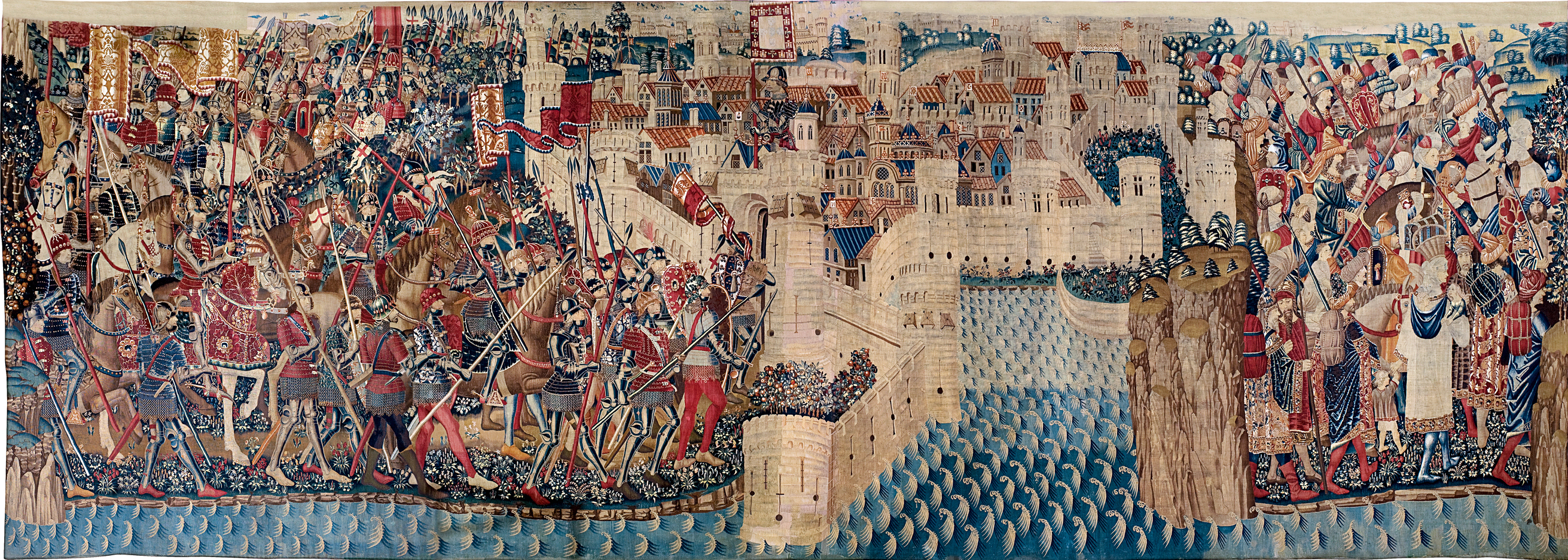
Fall of Tangier, one of the Pastrana Tapestries (1470s), recording the victories of Afonso V of Portugal about a decade earlier. Woven in Tournai

After a probable gap since the 11th century, in the late 14th century sets of tapestries returned as the grandest medium for "official military art", usually celebrating the victories of the person commissioning them. Philip the Bold commissioned a Battle of Roosbeke set two years after his victory in 1382, which was five metres high and totalled over 41 metres in width. John of Gaunt, Duke of Lancaster insisted it was changed when Philip displayed it at a diplomatic meeting in Calais in 1393 to negotiate a peace treaty; Gaunt regarded the subject-matter as inappropriate for the occasion. The Portuguese Pastrana Tapestries (1470s) were an early example, and a rare survival from so early.

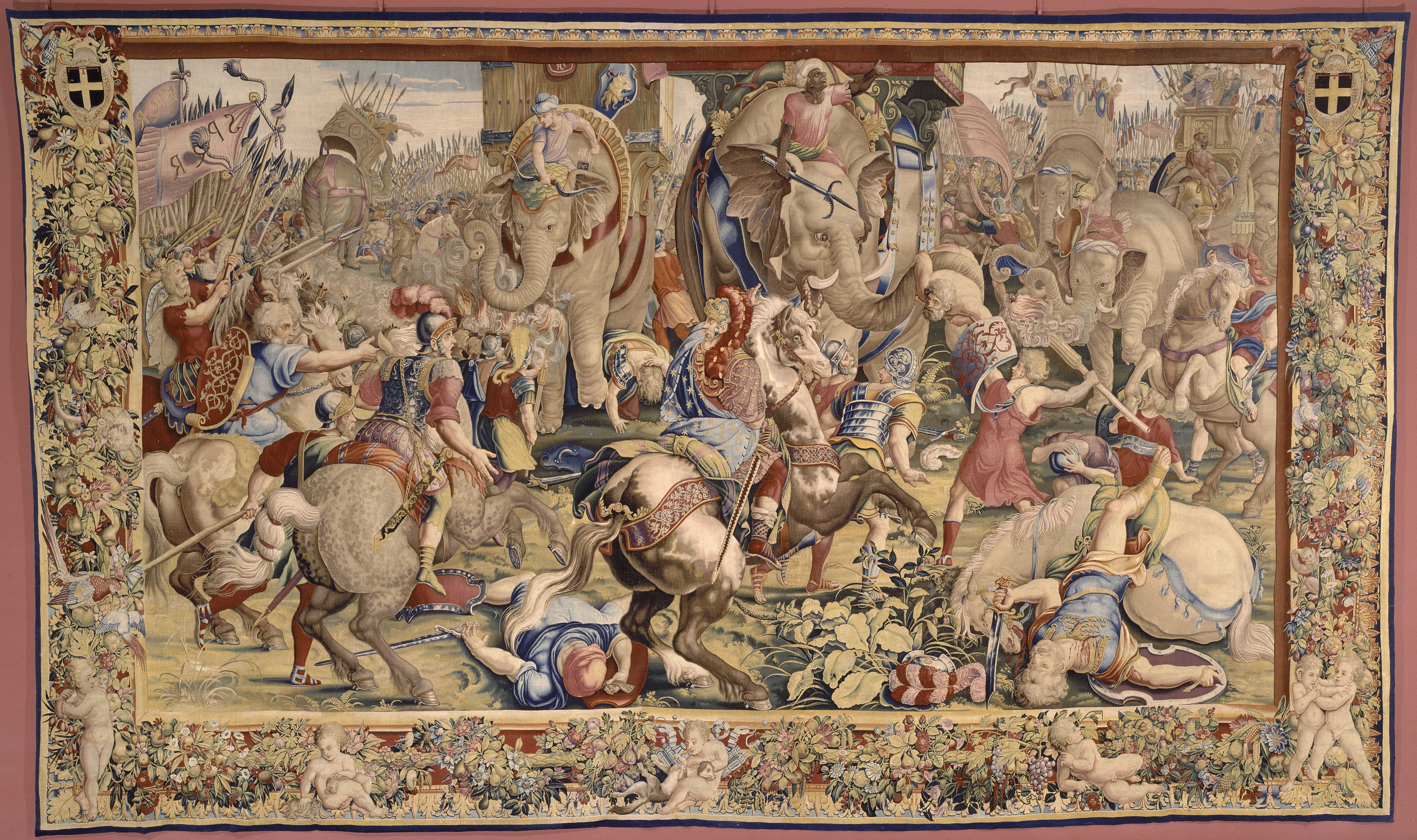
Battle of Zama (202 BC), from a set of the life of Scipio Africanus, Gobelins copy of c. 1688, after designs by Giulio Romano and Francesco Penni for a set destroyed in the French Revolution

Many sets were produced of the lives of classical heroes that included many battle scenes. Not only the Trojan War, Alexander the Great, Julius Caesar and Constantine I were commemorated, but also less likely figures such as Cyrus the Great of ancient Persia.

There were many 15th-century sets of contemporary wars, especially celebrating Habsburg victories. Charles V commissioned a large set after his decisive victory at the Battle of Pavia in 1525; a set is now in the Museo di Capodimonte in Naples. When he led an expedition to North Africa, culminating in the Conquest of Tunis in 1535 (no more lasting than that of Tangier depicted in the Pastrana tapestries), he took the Flemish artist Jan Cornelisz Vermeyen with him, mainly to produce drawings for the set of tapestries ordered on his return.

Contemporary military subjects became rather less popular as many 16th-century wars became religious, sometimes allegorical subjects were chosen to cover these. But the Battle of Lepanto was commemorated with a Brussels set, and the defeat of the Spanish Armada with the Armada Tapestries (1591); these were made in Delft, by a team who also made many tapestries of Dutch naval victories. The Armada set were destroyed in the Burning of Parliament in 1834, but are known from prints. Both sets adopted a high and distant aerial view, which continued in many later sets of land battles, often combined with a few large figures in the foreground. The French tapestries commissioned by Louis XIV of the victories early in his reign were of this type. Right at the end of the 16th century, a set (now in Madrid) was commissioned of the Triumphs and battles of Archduke Albert, who had just been made sovereign of the Spanish Netherlands (his military career had in fact been rather unsuccessful). The city council of Antwerp ordered it from the workshop of Maarten Reymbouts the Younger in Brussels, to be first seen on the occasion of his Royal entry to Antwerp in late 1599.

A set produced for John Churchill, 1st Duke of Marlborough showing his victories was varied for different clients, and even sold to one of his opponents, Maximilian II Emanuel, Elector of Bavaria, after reworking the generals' faces and other details.

=== Millefleur style ===
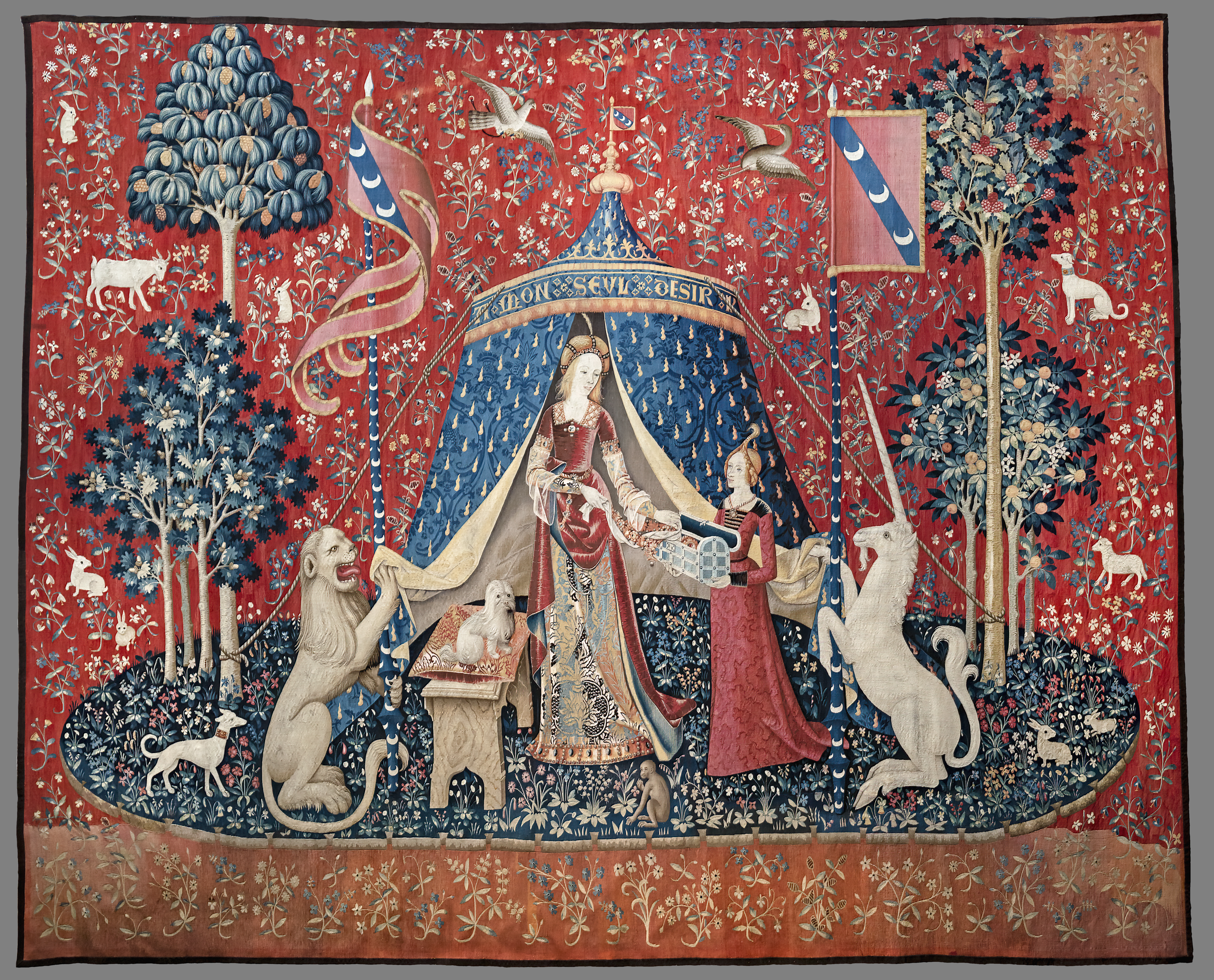
The Lady and the Unicorn: À mon seul désir (Musée national du Moyen Âge, Paris). Probably Brussels, c. 1500.

Millefleur (or millefleurs) was a background style of many different small flowers and plants, usually shown on a green ground, as though growing in grass. Often various animals are added, usually all at about the same size, so that a rabbit or dove and a unicorn are not much different in size. Trees are usually far too small and out of scale with the flowers around them, a feature also generally found in medieval painting.

The millefleur style was used for a range of different subjects from about 1400 to 1550, but mainly between about 1480 and 1520. In many subjects the millefleur background stretches to the top of the tapestry, eliminating any sky; the minimization of sky was already a feature of tapestry style; the Devonshire Hunting Tapestries show an early stage of the style. Prominent millefleur backgrounds, as opposed to those mostly covered with figures, are especially a feature of allegorical and courtly subjects. The Lady and the Unicorn set in Paris are famous examples, from around 1500.

Millefleur backgrounds became very common for heraldic tapestries, which were one of the most popular relatively small types, usually more tall than wide. These usually featured the coat of arms of the patron in the centre, with a wide floral field. They would often be hung behind the patron when he sat in state or dined, and were made for many nobles who could not afford the huge narrative sets bought by royalty. Enghien was a smaller weaving centre that seems to have specialized in these. Earlier types of heraldic tapestries had often repeated elements of the heraldry in patterns.

=== Landscape ===
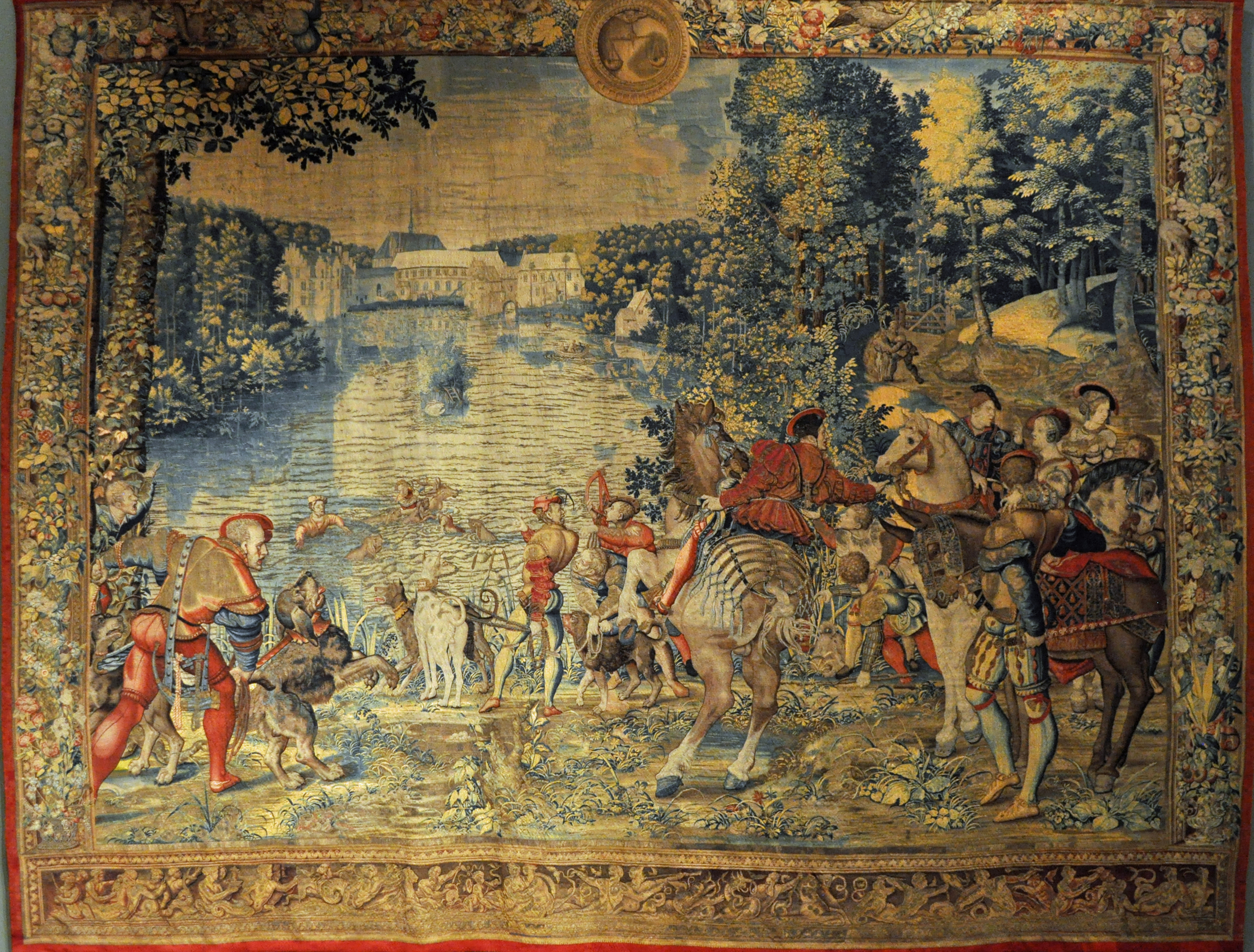
"September", from Les Chasses de Maximilien, 1531

After about 1520 the top workshops moved away from millefleur settings towards naturalistic landscape, with all the elements sized at a consistent perspective scale. Tapestries whose main content was landscape and animals are known as verdure subjects (from the French for "greenery"). This genre has suffered more than most from colour changes as the greens of tapestries are especially prone to fade, or turn to blues. Smaller tapestries of this type remained popular until the 18th century, and had the advantage that workshops could make them without a specific order, and distribute them across Europe via a network of dealers. From about 1600 they followed the wider trends in European landscape painting and prints. Oudenarde specialized in these, but they were produced in many towns. As with paintings, the addition of a figure or two could elevate such pieces to a depiction of a story from classical mythology, or a hunting subject.

=== Arrival of Renaissance style and subjects ===
Tapestry weavers in the Netherlands had become very comfortable working with the Gothic style by the late 15th century, and were slow to reflect the stylistic changes of the Italian Renaissance; perhaps pressure from the customers for tapestries led the way. Prints enabled Italian designs to be seen in the north.

A distinctive Italian subject was the Petrarchan triumph, derived from his poem-cycle I trionfi (before 1374). The first recorded tapestries were a three-piece set ordered by Duke Philip the Bold of Burgundy from Paris in 1399. A set made in the 1450s for Giovanni de' Medici, a leading patron of the latest Florentine style, used cartoons sent from Italy to the Netherlandish weavers. But the subjects suited the tapestry weavers style, as most designs included packed crowds of elaborately dressed figures, and there were moral messages to be drawn.

== 16th century ==
The 16th century continued the taste for tapestry, and was arguably the finest period in the history of the medium. By now the tapestry-producing towns were mostly ruled by the Habsburg family, who replaced the Valois as the dominant patrons. At the start of the century Tournai was perhaps still the largest weaving centre, but after a plague it was replaced by Brussels, which as the Netherlandish administrative capital of the Valois and Habsburgs in recent decades was probably already the main centre for the highest quality weaving by 1500. But there were many other towns where tapestries were woven.

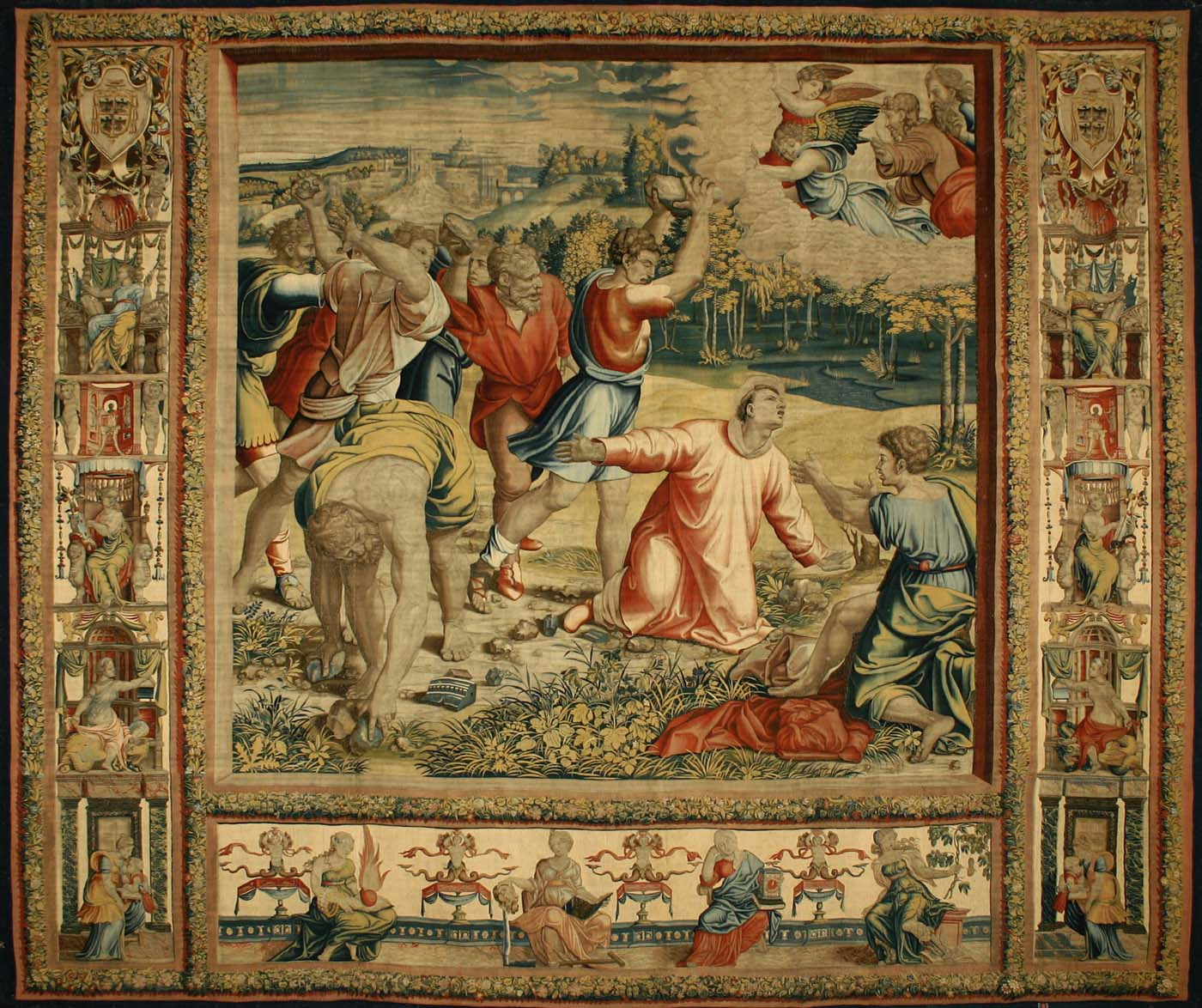
The Stoning of Saint Stephen, designed by Raphael for the Sistine Chapel in 1515–16, a later copy before 1557, in Mantua

Tapestries were commissioned in the Netherlands by rulers across Europe, from King Henry VIII in England, to Pope Leo X and Sigismund II Augustus of Poland and Lithuania. Ownership of smaller tapestries was also spreading more widely through the nobility and bourgeoisie. From 1528 tapestries of larger sizes made in Brussels had to be so marked, and with the maker's or dealer's mark, making the task of the historian much easier. After an agreement between the relevant guilds in 1476, the cartoons for the main designs had to be supplied by a member of the painters' guild, while the weavers could elaborate these with detail, especially in millefeur designs. This ensured a high quality of design for Brussels pieces.

At the beginning of the century Late Gothic styles held sway, and both the most famous sets of millefleur "unicorn" tapestries were made around 1500, perhaps to designs from Paris: The Lady and the Unicorn (now Paris), and The Hunt of the Unicorn (now New York). Pope Leo's set for the Sistine Chapel, designed by Raphael in 1515–16, marked the introduction of the full Italian High Renaissance style to tapestry, and the top northern designers now attempted to adopt it, which was rather a struggle for them, although the wide distribution of prints across Europe gave them one easy route, which many took. Les Chasses de Maximilien (The Hunts of Maximilian) was a series of twelve huge Brussels tapestries designed by Bernard van Orley in the 1530s for the Habsburgs, one of the most successful efforts to achieve an up-to-date Renaissance style. Technically, Brussels tapestries in the last quarter of the 15th century had already become sophisticated enough to begin to incorporate more illusionistic elements, distinguishing between different textures in their subject-matter, and including portraits of individuals (now mostly unknown) rather than generic figures.

Over the century oil paintings mostly moved from a panel support to canvas, allowing a far greater size, and began to compete seriously with tapestries. The authenticity of the master's touch that paintings allowed, but tapestry did not, became appreciated by the most sophisticated patrons, including the Habsburgs. However, Charles V and Philip II of Spain continued to spend huge sums on tapestries, apparently believing them the most magnificent form of decoration, and one that maintained continuity with their Burgundian ancestors.

== 17th century ==
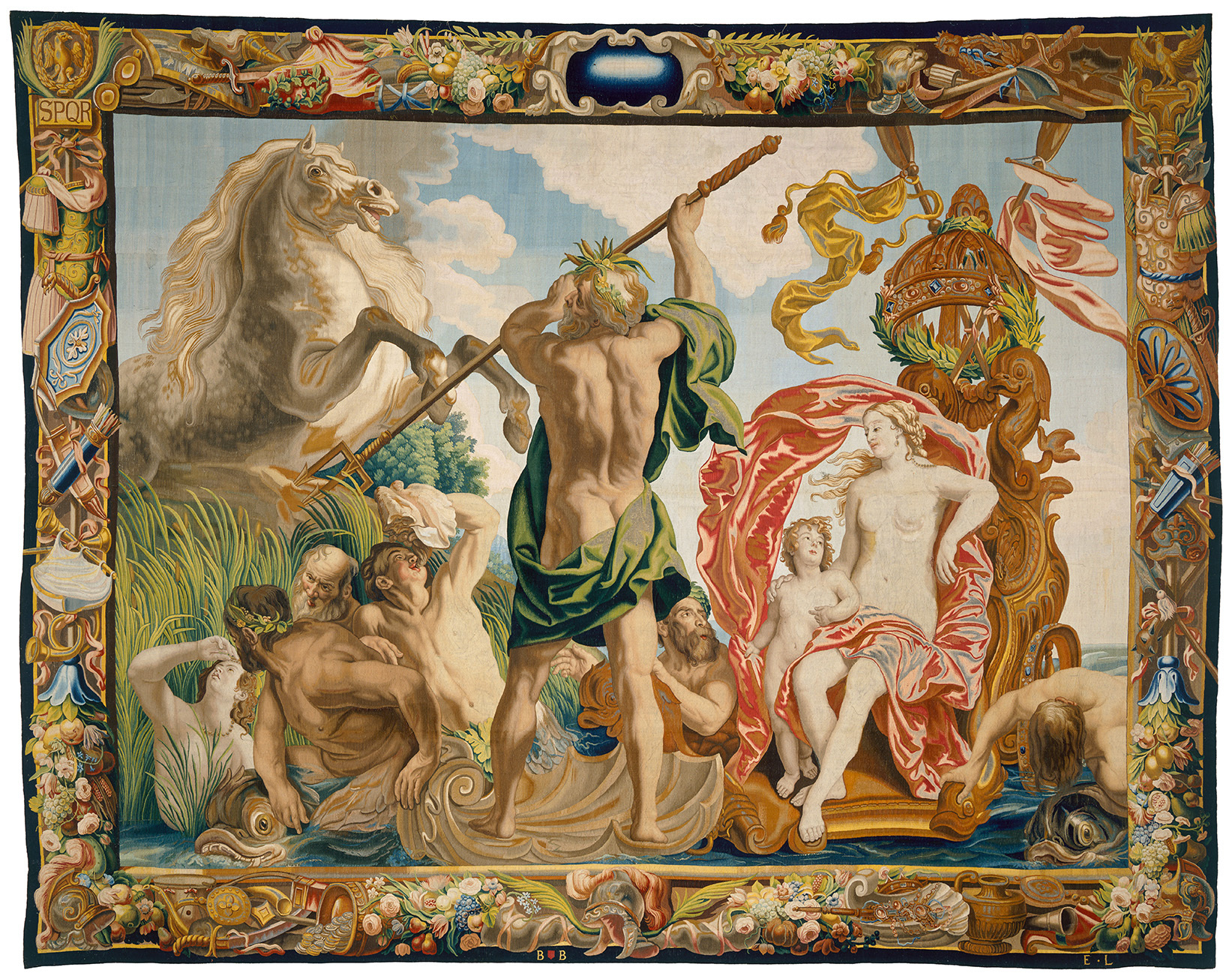
Baroque design by Jacob Jordaens, Creation of the Horse, from an equine series, woven in wool, silk, gold and silver, Brussels, 1650s

The early part of the 17th century saw the taste for tapestry among the elite continuing, although painting was steadily gaining ground. Brussels remained much the most important weaving centre, and Rubens, mostly based in Antwerp not far away, brought the grand Baroque style to the medium, with Jacob Jordaens and others also designing many. In later generations important designers included Justus van Egmont (d. 1674), Ludwig van Schoor (d. 1702) and Jan van Orley (d. 1735, the last of a long-lasting dynasty). The Brussels workshops declined somewhat in the second half of the century, both as large Flemish Baroque paintings took some of their market, and French competition squeezed the remaining niche for tapestries.

Production in Paris revived from 1608, flagging in the civil wars of the 1640s, but starting again in 1658 when Nicolas Fouquet founded a workshop. After his fall Colbert mostly merged this to the new Gobelins Manufactory he founded for the king in 1663, which continues to this day. The Beauvais Manufactory, always a private enterprise, was founded by Colbert in 1664, but only became significant from twenty years later. Aubusson tapestry, probably a continuation of earlier small workshops, continued but was to become more significant in the next century. The Gobelins works, fed designs in the latest Style Louis XIV by the court artists, became increasingly dominant over the rest of the century, and by 1700 was the most admired and imitated workshop in Europe.

The Mortlake Tapestry Works outside London were founded in 1619, with encouragement from King Charles I of England, using Flemish weavers at the start, and in the 1620s and 1630s were producing some of the best quality tapestry in Europe. The Medici workshop in Florence continued, and from 1630 was joined by one in Rome, started by Cardinal Francesco Barberini with the inevitable imported Flemish director. Both the Mortlake and Rome workshops petered out around the end of the century. In Germany, workshops were established in Munich in 1604, and some nine further cities by the end of the century, many sponsored by the local ruler.

== 18th century ==
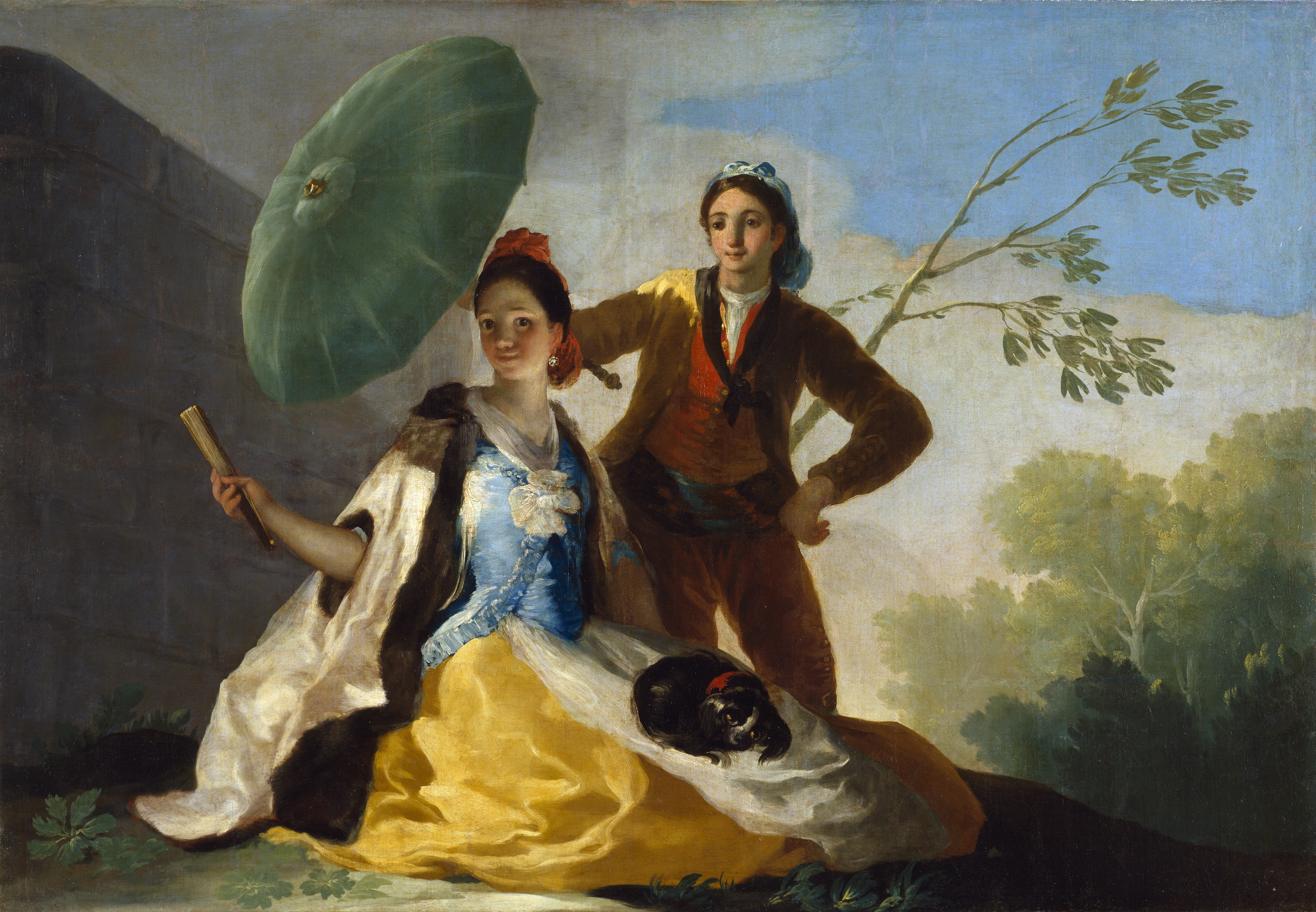
Francisco Goya cartoon The Parasol, 1777, Prado

Around the start of the century there was increased interest in landscape subjects, some still with hunting scenes, but others showing genre subjects of rural life.

Few new workshops were begun in the century, the main exception being the Royal Tapestry Factory in Madrid. This was started in 1720, soon after Spain lost its territories in Flanders under the Treaty of Utrecht. Philip V of Spain brought Jacob van der Goten and six of his sons to Madrid. Much the best known tapestries are those designed by Francisco Goya from 1775. These mostly show genre scenes of lovers or country people recreating. Both his cartoons and the tapestries made from them mostly survive, with many of the cartoons in the Prado, and the tapestries still in the royal palaces. As with Raphael's cartoons for the Sistine Chapel tapestries, modern critics tend to prefer the cartoons. The works were privately owned by the van der Gotens and descendants until 1997, and the last member of the family resigned as chair in 2002. Apart from pauses during wars, the works has continued to produce tapestries.

Around the mid-century, the new Rococo style proved very effective in tapestries, now a good deal smaller than before. François Boucher produced 45 cartoons for Beauvais, and then by 1753 followed the animal painter Jean-Baptiste Oudry as artistic director at Gobelins. Oudry's best known set was the eight-strong The Pastoral Amusements made from the 1720s onwards in many repetitions.

During the second half of the century, the main Brussels workshops gradually closed, the last in 1794. Tapestry suited neither Neoclassicism nor Romanticism very well, and this together with the disruptions of the French Revolution and Napoleonic Wars brought the production of large figurative tapestries almost to a halt across Europe.

== 19th century ==
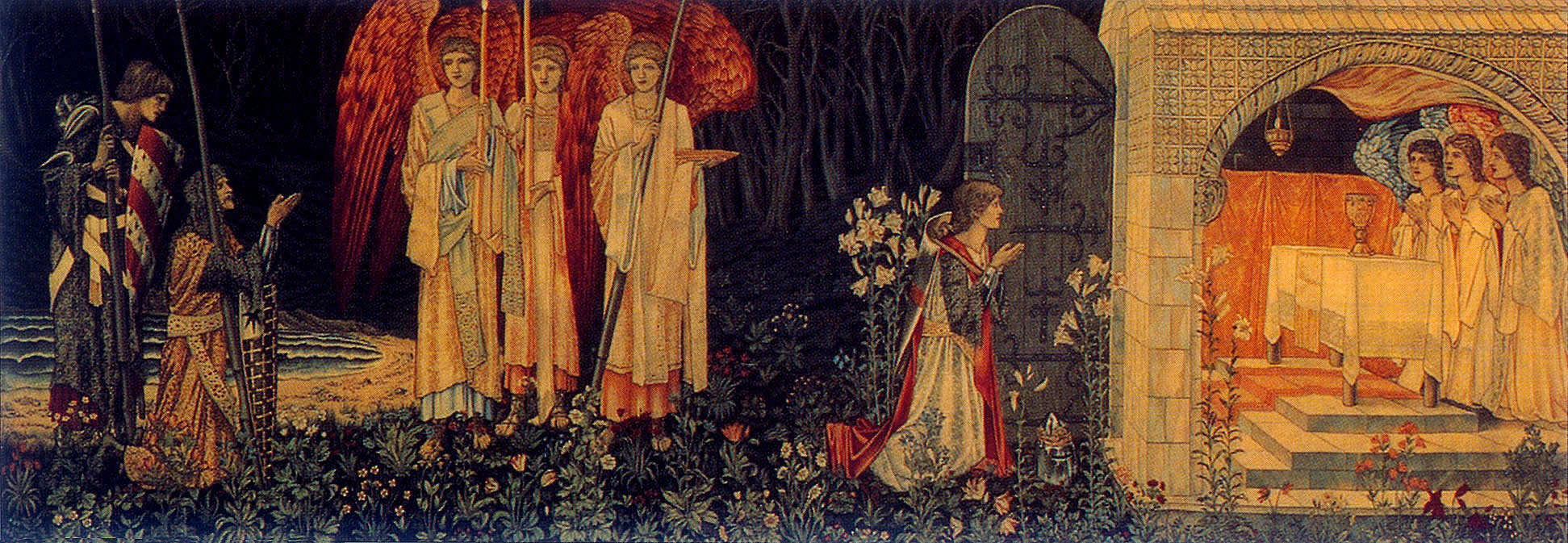
The Attainment, one of the Holy Grail tapestries, Morris & Co., 1890s

In the 19th century, William Morris resurrected the art of tapestry-making in the medieval style at Merton Abbey. Morris & Co. made successful series of tapestries for home and ecclesiastical uses, with figures based on cartoons by Edward Burne-Jones. The set of six Holy Grail tapestries of the 1890s, repeated a number of times, are the largest they made, and perhaps the most successful.

Traditional tapestries are still made at the Gobelins factory in Paris, and the royal factory in Madrid. They and a few other old European workshops also repair and restore old tapestries; the main British workshop is at Hampton Court Palace, a department of the Royal Collection Trust.

== Outside Europe ==
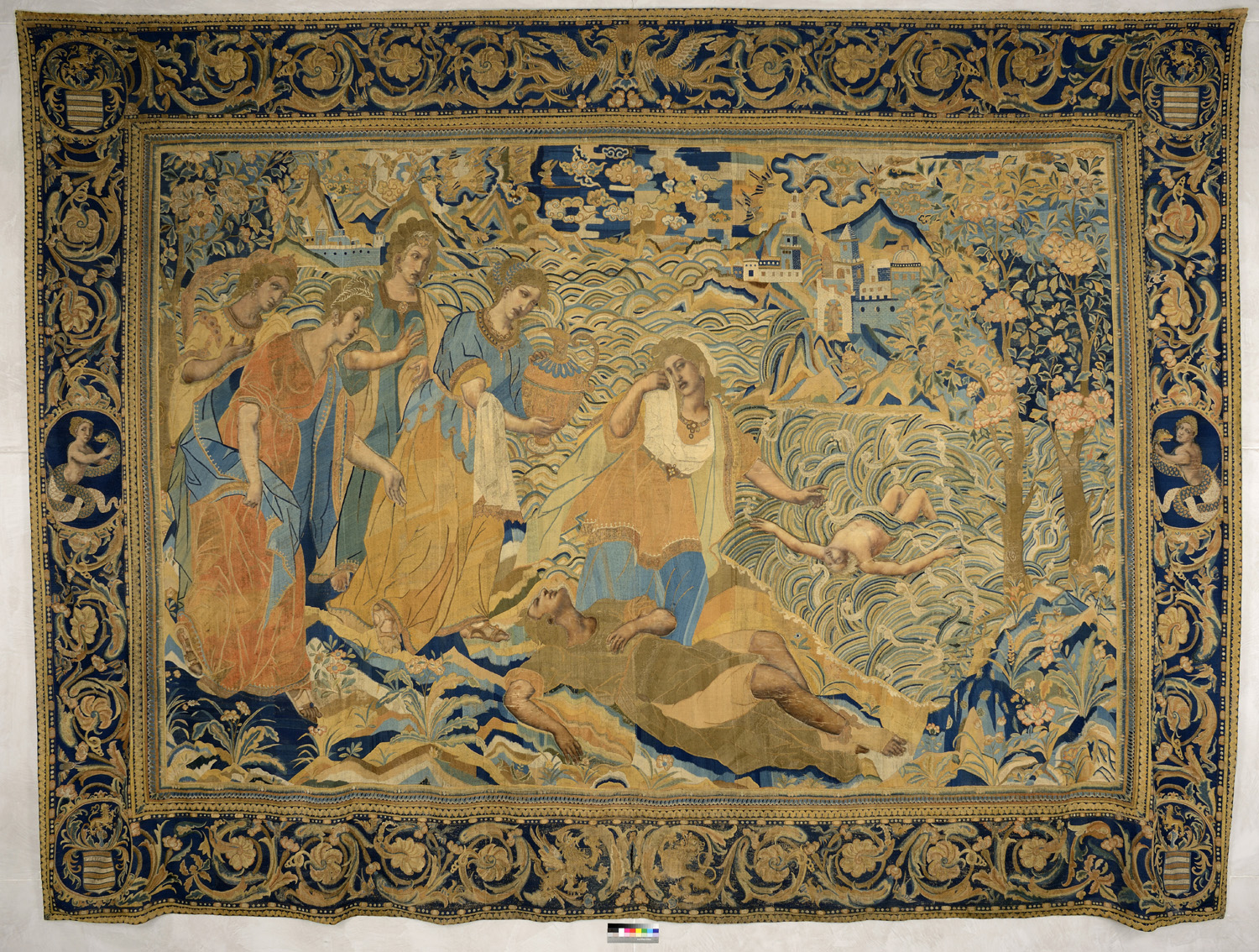
The Death of Polydorus, 1620s

The Chinese kesi is a tapestry weave, normally using silk on a small scale compared to European wall-hangings. Clothing for the court was one of the main uses. The density of knots is typically very high, with a gown of the best quality perhaps involving as much work as a much larger European tapestry. Initially used for small pieces, often with animal, bird and flower decoration, or dragons for imperial clothing, under the Ming dynasty it was used to copy paintings.

The Story of Troy is an unusual set of seven large tapestry hangings made in China for the Portuguese governor of Macao in the 1620s, blending Western and Chinese styles. Most of the hangings are embroidery, but the faces and flesh parts of the figures are appliqué painted silk satin pieces, reflecting a Chinese technique often used for Buddhist banners, and the larger forms of thangka.

Kilims and Navajo rugs are also types of tapestry work, the designs of both mostly restricted to geometrical patterns similar to those of other rug weaving techniques.

== Contemporary tapestry ==
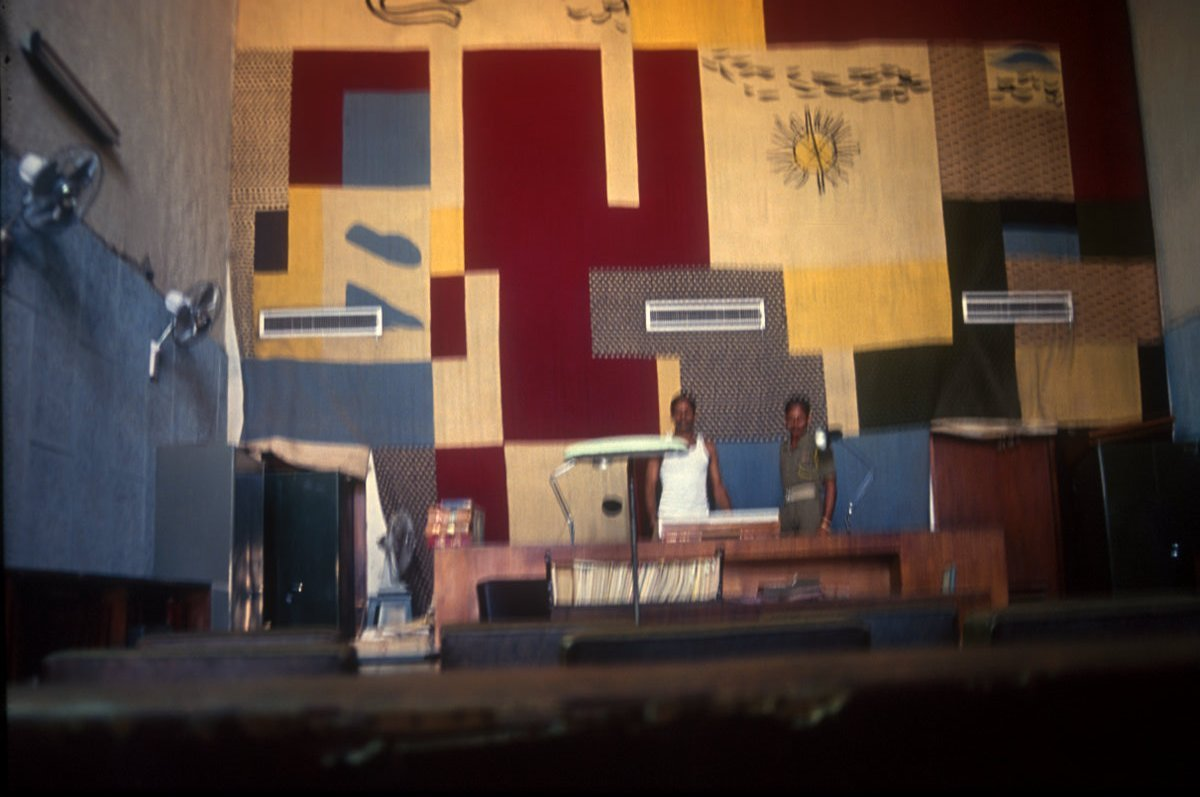
Tapestry by Le Corbusier in Chandigarh, 1953

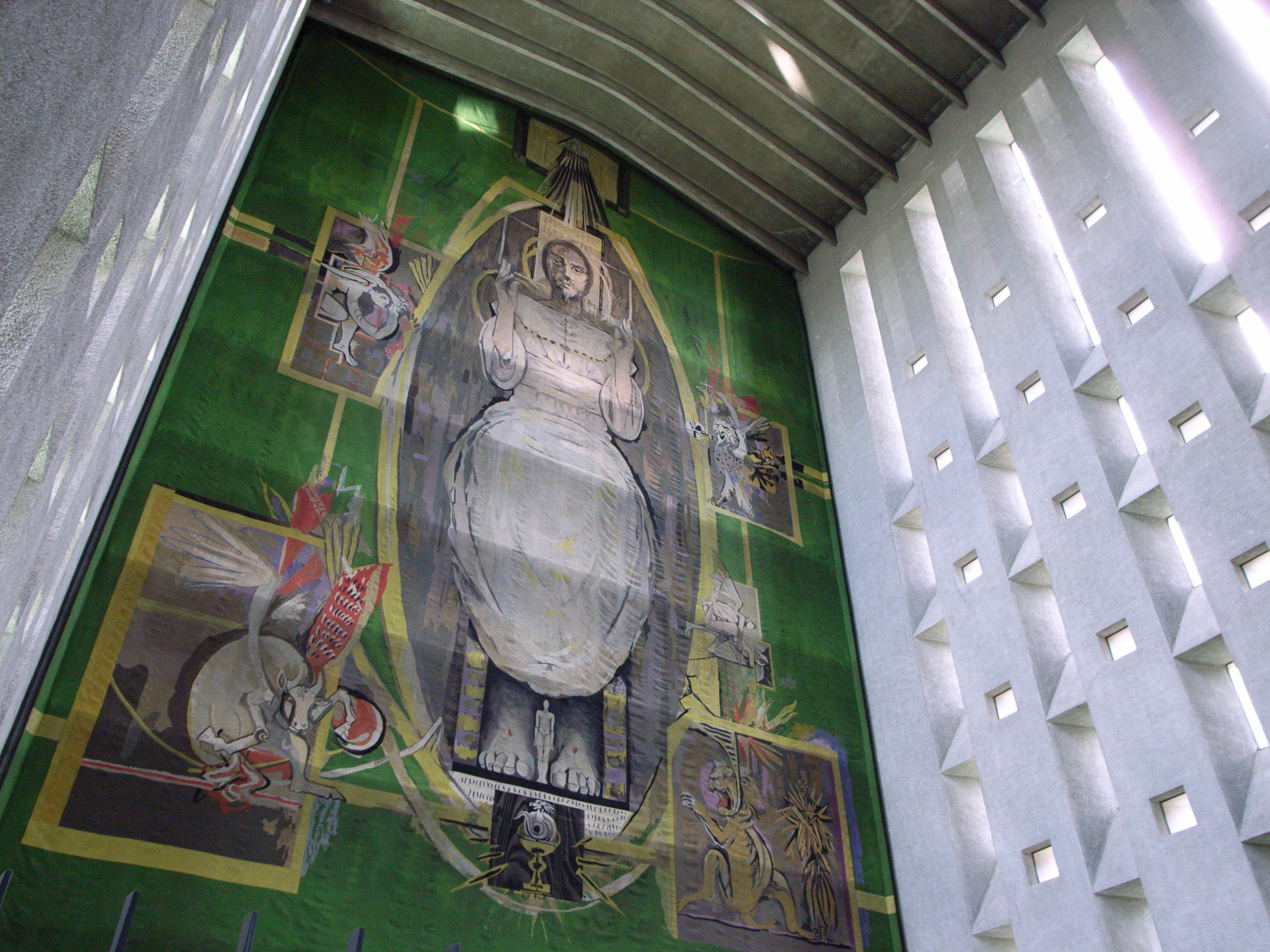
Tapestry of Christ in Glory, 1962, Coventry Cathedral, 75.5 feet (23.0 m) high, designed by Graham Sutherland and woven by Pinton Frères, Felletin, France

What distinguishes the contemporary field from its pre-World War II history is the predominance of the artist as weaver in the contemporary medium. This trend has its roots in France during the 1950s, where one of the "cartoonists" for the Aubusson tapestry studios, Jean Lurçat spearheaded a revival of the medium by streamlining colour selection, thereby simplifying production, and by organizing a series of Biennial exhibits held in Lausanne, Switzerland. The Polish work submitted to the first Biennale, which opened in 1962, was quite novel. Traditional workshops in Poland had collapsed as a result of the war. Also art supplies in general were hard to acquire. Many Polish artists had learned to weave as part of their art school training and began creating highly individualistic work by using atypical materials like jute and sisal. With each Biennale the popularity of works focusing on exploring innovative constructions from a wide variety of fiber resounded around the world.

There were many weavers in pre-war United States, but there had never been a prolonged system of workshops for producing tapestries. Therefore, weavers in America were primarily self-taught and chose to design as well as weave their art. Through these Lausanne exhibitions, US artists/weavers, and others in countries all over the world, were excited about the Polish trend towards experimental forms. Throughout the 1970s almost all weavers had explored some manner of techniques and materials in vogue at the time. What this movement contributed to the newly realized field of art weaving, termed "contemporary tapestry", was the option for working with texture, with a variety of materials and with the freedom for individuality in design

In the 1980s it became clear that the process of weaving weft-faced tapestry had another benefit, that of stability. The artists who chose tapestry as their medium developed a broad range of personal expression, styles and subject matter, stimulated and nourished by an international movement to revive and renew tapestry traditions from all over the world. Competing for commissions and expanding exhibition venues were essential factors in how artists defined and accomplished their goals.

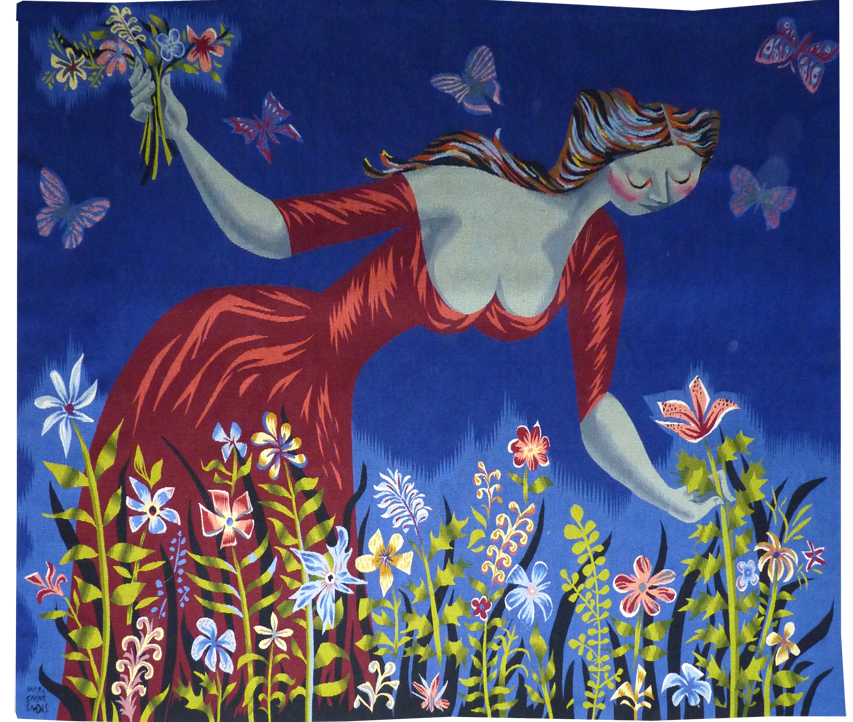
Lady Melanie's Bouquet, by Marc Saint-Saëns 1951.

Much of the impetus in the 1980s for working in this more traditional process came from the Bay Area in Northern California where, twenty years earlier, Mark Adams, an eclectic artist, had two exhibitions of his tapestry designs. He went on to design many large tapestries for local buildings. Hal Painter, another well-respected artist in the area became a prolific tapestry artist during the decade weaving his own designs. He was one of the main artists to "...create the atmosphere which helped give birth to the second phase of the contemporary textile movement – textiles as art – that recognition that textiles no longer had to be utilitarian, functional, to serve as interior decoration."

Early in the 1980s many artists committed to getting more professional and often that meant travelling to attend the rare educational programmes offered by newly formed ateliers, such as the San Francisco Tapestry Workshop, or to far-away institutions they identified as fitting their needs. This phenomenon was happening in Europe and Australia as well as in North America.

Opportunities for entering juried tapestry exhibitions were beginning to happen by 1986, primarily because the American Tapestry Alliance (ATA), founded in 1982, organised biennial juried exhibitions starting in 1986. The biennials were planned to coincide with the Handweavers Guild or America's "Convergence" conferences. The new potential for seeing the work of other tapestry artists and the ability to observe how one's own work might fare in such venues profoundly increased the awareness of a community of like-minded artists. Regional groups were formed for producing exhibits and sharing information.

The desire of many artists for greater interaction escalated as an international tapestry symposium in Melbourne, Australia in 1988 lead to a second organization committed to tapestry, the International Tapestry Network (ITNET). Its goal was to connect American tapestry artists with the burgeoning international community. The magazines were discontinued in 1997 as communicating digitally became a more useful tool for interactions. As the world has moved into the digital age, tapestry artists around the world continue to share and inspire each other's work.

Medieval European loom, of a type still in use for smaller pieces. The different colours are not shown.

By the new millennium however, fault lines had surfaced within the field. Many universities that previously had strong weaving components in their art departments, such as San Francisco State University, no longer offered handweaving as an option as they shifted their focus to computerized equipment. A primary cause for discarding the practice was that only one student could use the equipment for the duration of a project whereas in most media, like painting or ceramics, the easels or potters wheels were used by several students in a day. Worldwide, people from all different cultures began adopting these forms of decor for profession and personal use.

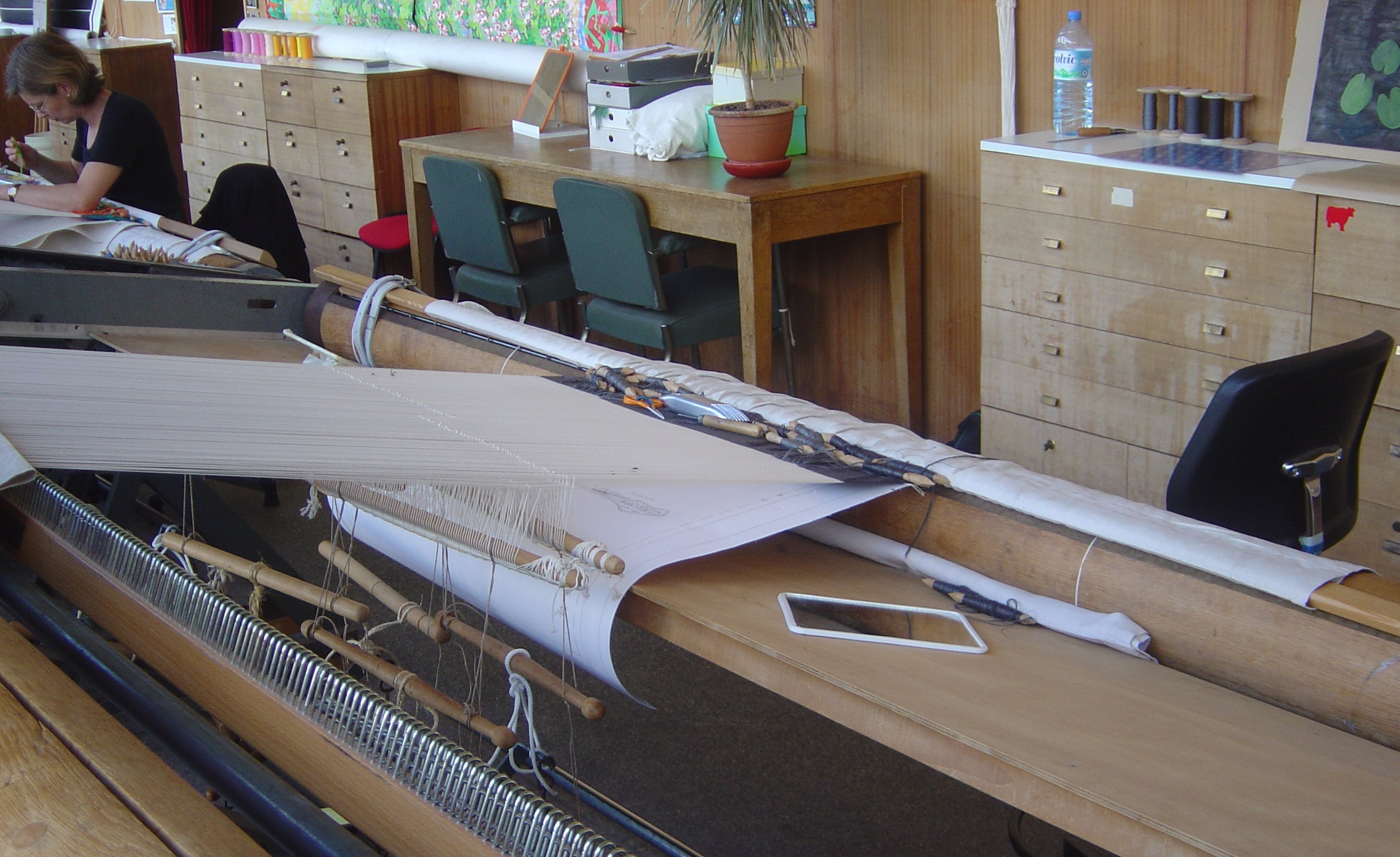
A commercial basse-lisse tapestry loom in the Gobelins factory, 2004

At the same time, "fiber art" had become one of the most popular mediums in their art programmes. Young artists were interested in exploring a wider scope of processes for creating art through the materials classified as fibre. This shift to more multimedia and sculptural forms and the desire to produce work more quickly had the effect of pushing contemporary tapestry artists inside and outside the academic institutions to ponder how they might keep pace in order to sustain visibility in their art form.

Susan Iverson, a professor in the School of the Arts at Virginia Commonwealth University, explains her reasons:

I came to tapestry after several years of exploring complex weaves. I became enamored with tapestry because of its simplicity — its straightforward qualities. It allowed me to investigate form or image or texture, and it had the structural integrity to hold its own form. I loved the substantial quality of a tapestry woven with heavy threads—its object quality.

Another prominent artist, Joan Baxter, states:

My passion for tapestry arrived suddenly on the first day of my introduction to it in my first year at ECA [Edinburgh College of Art.] I don't remember ever having consciously thought about tapestry before that day but I somehow knew that eventually I'd be really good at this. From that day I have been able to plough a straight path deeper and deeper into tapestry, through my studies in Scotland and Poland, my 8 years as a studio weaver in England and Australia and since 1987 as an independent tapestry artist. The demanding creative ethos of the tapestry department gave me the confidence, motivation and self-discipline I needed to move out into the world as a professional tapestry weaver and artist. What was most inspiring for me as a young student was that my tutors in the department were all practising, exhibiting artists engaging positively with what was then a cutting edge international Fibre Art movement.

Archie Brennan, said of tapestry:

500 years ago it was already extremely sophisticated in its development-- aesthetically, technically and in diversity of purpose. Today, its lack of a defined purpose, its rarity, gives me an opportunity to seek new roles, to extend its historic language and, above all, to dominate my compulsive, creative drive. In 1967, I made a formal decision to step away from the burgeoning and exciting fiber arts movement and to refocus on woven tapestry's long-established graphic pictorial role.

== Jacquard tapestries, colour and the human eye ==
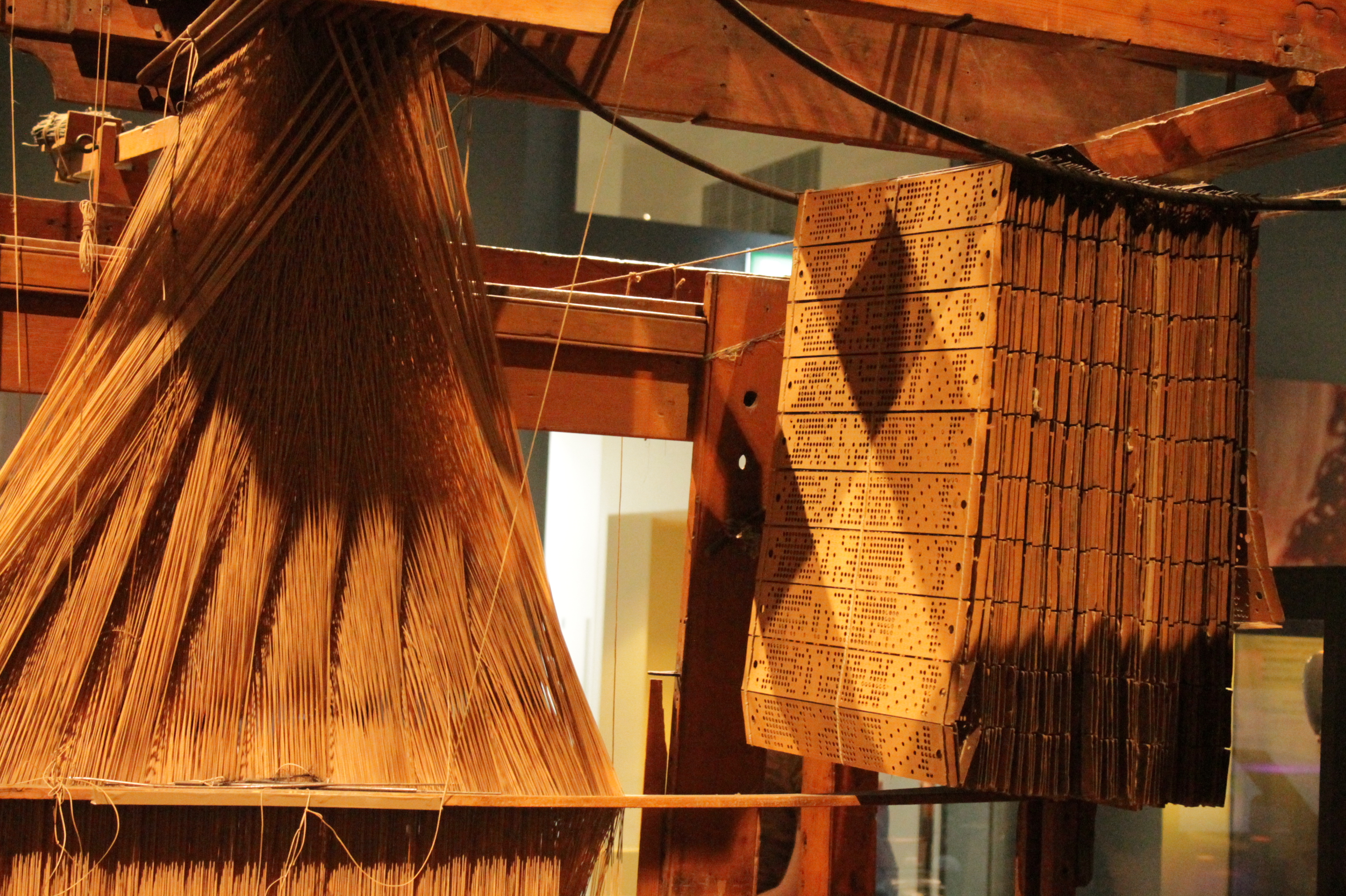
A Jacquard loom showing information punchcards, National Museum of Scotland

The term tapestry may also be used to describe large figurative weft-faced textiles made on Jacquard looms. Before the 1990s tapestry upholstery fabrics and reproductions of the famous tapestries of the Middle Ages had been produced using Jacquard techniques but more recently, artists such as Chuck Close, Patrick Lichty, and the workshop Magnolia Editions have adapted the computerised Jacquard process to producing fine art. Typically, tapestries are translated from the original design via a process resembling paint-by-numbers: a cartoon is divided into regions, each of which is assigned a solid colour based on a standard palette. However, in Jacquard weaving, the repeating series of multicoloured warp and weft threads can be used to create colours that are optically blended – i.e., the human eye apprehends the threads' combination of values as a single colour.

This method can be likened to pointillism, which originated from discoveries made in the tapestry medium. The style's emergence in the 19th century can be traced to the influence of Michel Eugène Chevreul, a French chemist responsible for developing the colour wheel of primary and intermediary hues. Chevreul worked as the director of the dye works at Les Gobelins tapestry works in Paris, where he noticed that the perceived colour of a particular thread was influenced by its surrounding threads, a phenomenon he called "simultaneous contrast". Chevreul's work was a continuation of theories of colour elaborated by Leonardo da Vinci and Goethe; in turn, his work influenced painters including Eugène Delacroix and Georges-Pierre Seurat.

The principles articulated by Chevreul also apply to contemporary television and computer displays, which use tiny dots of red, green and blue (RGB) light to render colour, with each composite being called a pixel.

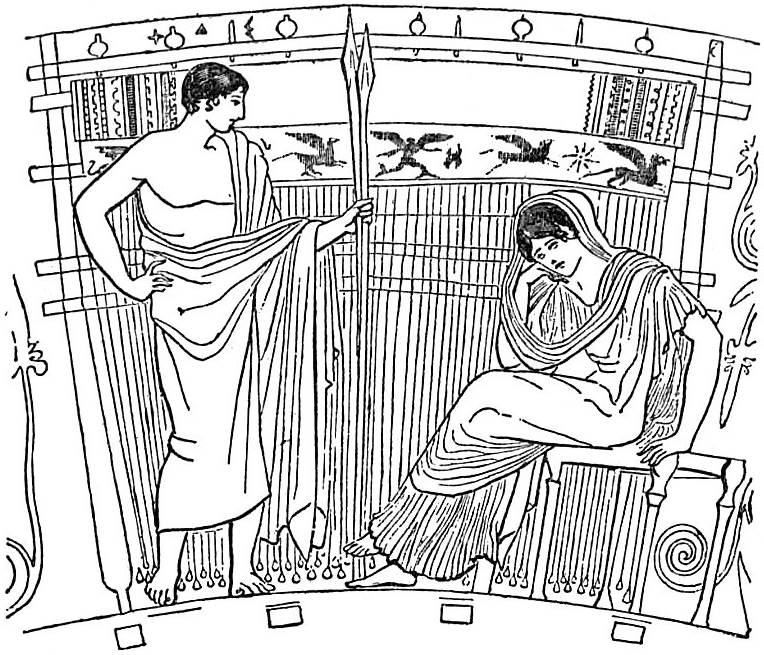
Penelope at her warp-weighted tapestry loom, after an Ancient Greek vase

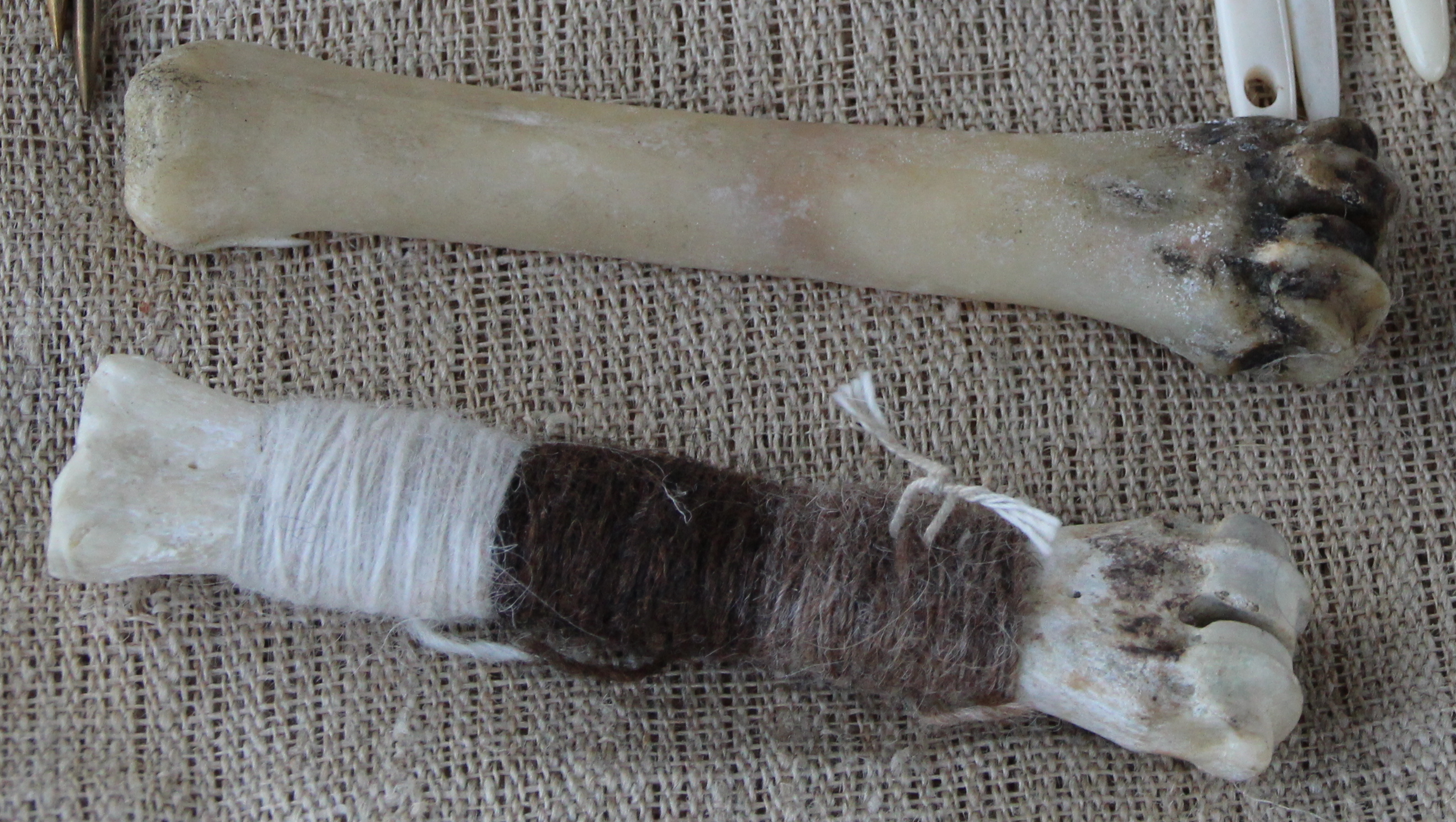
Tapestry bones actually made from cannonbones, replica Gallo-Roman

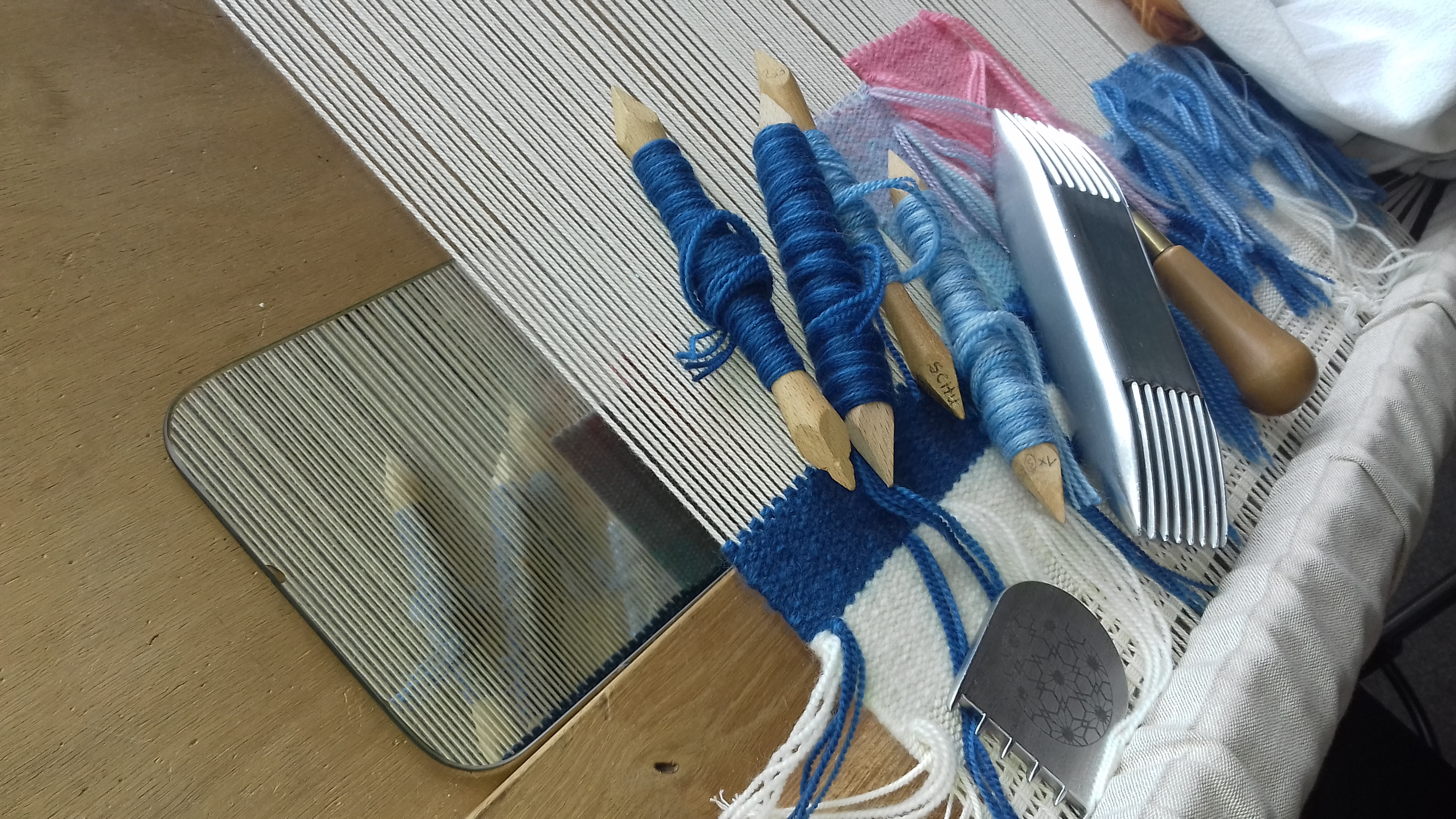
Tapestry tools on a loom: mirror, bones (wrapped with yarn), scraper (with short teeth), heavy comb (double-ended, to batten the weft), and awl (tip hidden).

A power loom in the TextielMuseum, Tilburg weaving a tapestry for the Niewe Kerk Middelburg.

== List of famous tapestries ==
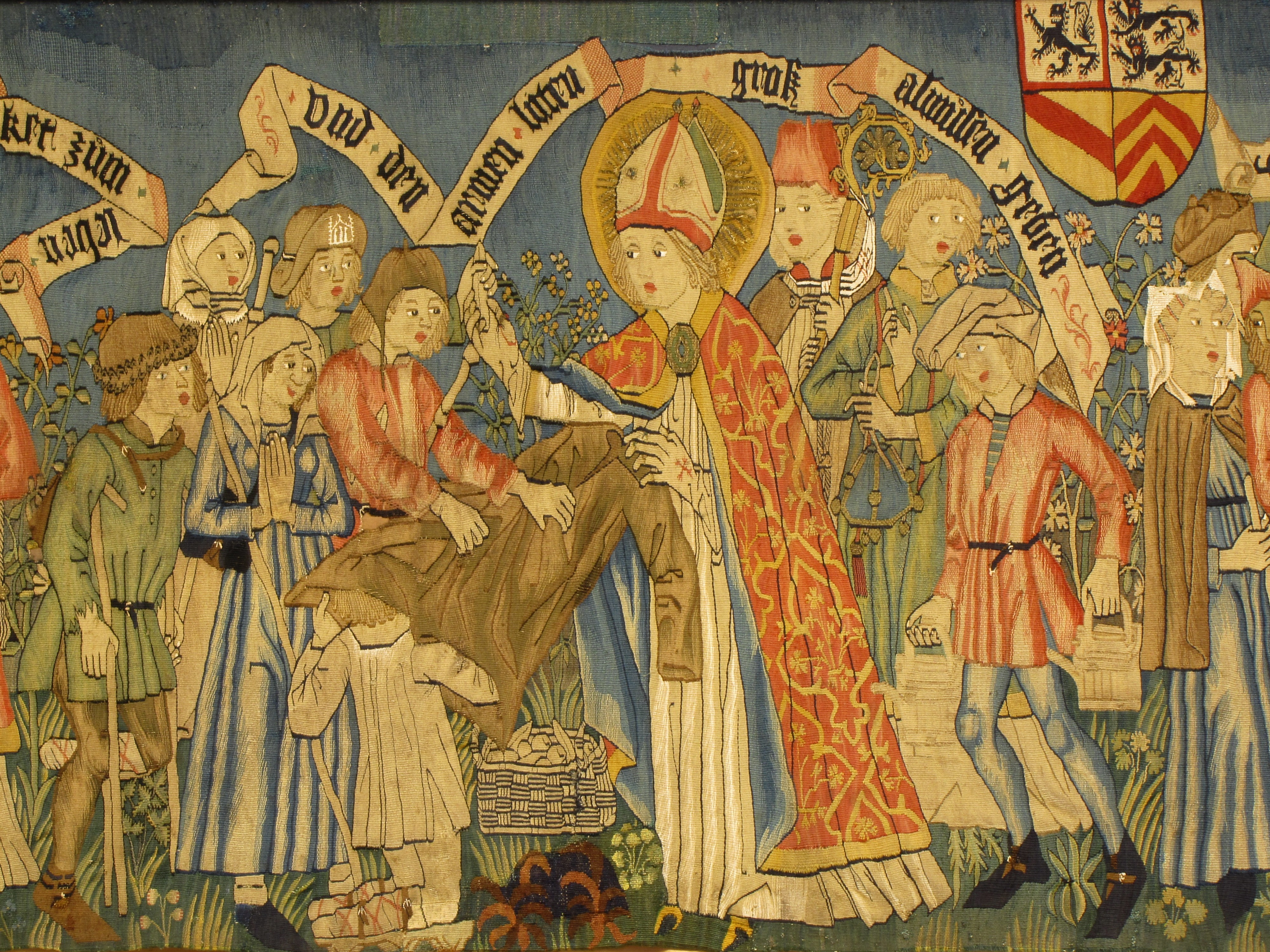
St Adelphus gives clothes to the poor, part of the tapestry of the Life and Miracles of St Adelphus, c. 1510 (Église Saint-Pierre-et-Saint-Paul, Neuwiller-lès-Saverne)

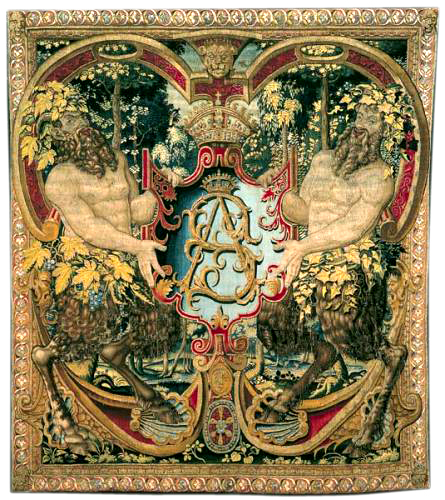
Tapestry with monogram "SA" of King Sigismund II Augustus of Poland/Lithuania, Brussels, c. 1555. Part of famous Jagiellonian tapestries, also known as the Wawel Tapestries or Wawel Arrases.

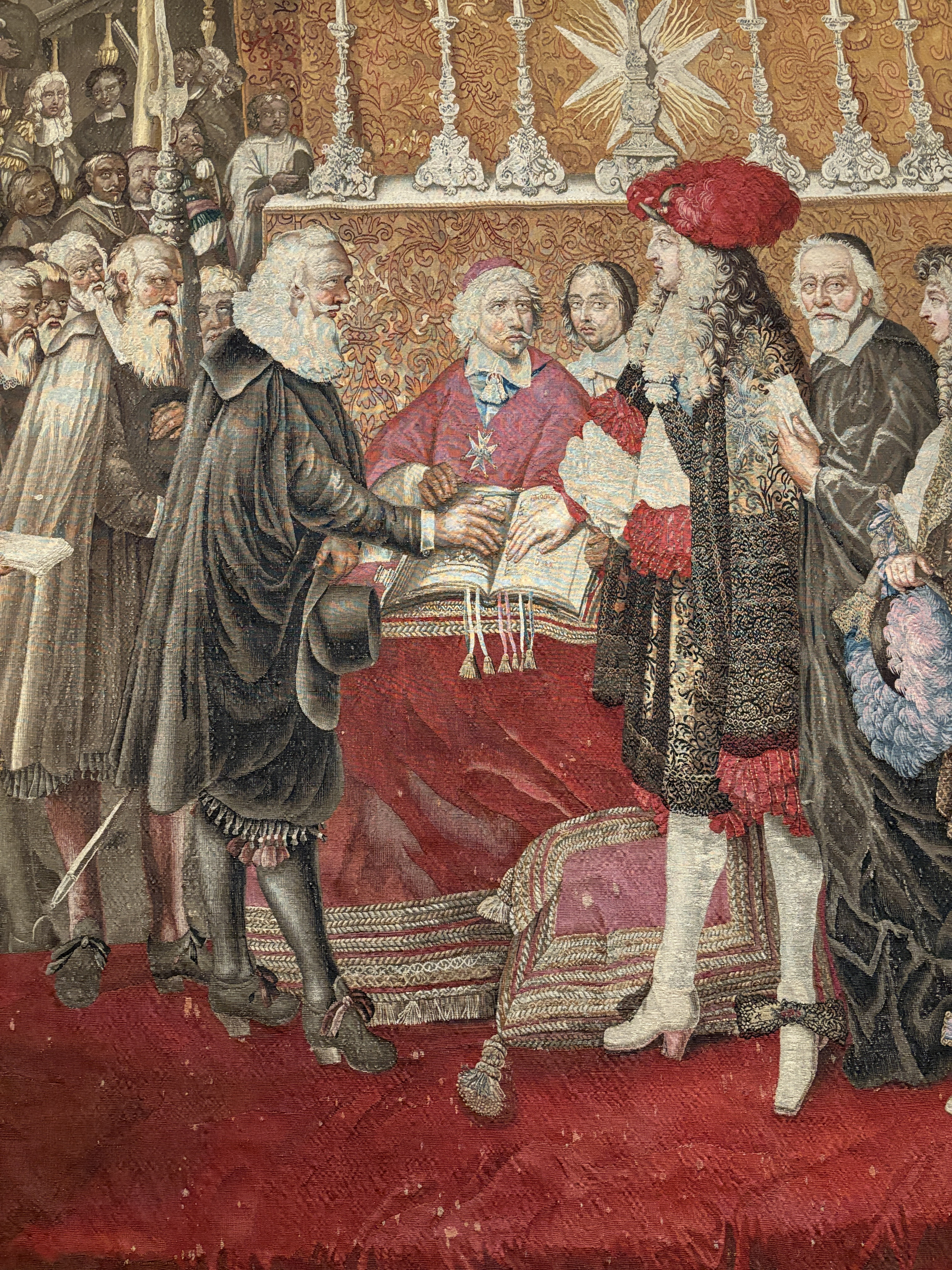
Detail of the Alliance Tapestry, depicting the renewal of the mercenary alliance between France and the Swiss in 1663. In the foreground are King Louis XIV (right) and Johann Heinrich Waser, a Swiss politician, Mayor of Zürich and Bailiff of the County of Kyburg.

- The Trojan War tapestry referred to by Homer in Book III of the Iliad, where Iris disguises herself as Laodice and finds Helen "working at a great web of purple linen, on which she was embroidering the battles between Trojans and Achaeans, that Ares had made them fight for her sake." Though the composition of the Iliad spanned a period of approximately 700 years, it is worth noting that this method of weaving was in common use in or before the eighth century BC.
- The Sampul tapestry, woollen wall hanging, 3rd–2nd century BC, Sampul, Ürümqi Xinjiang Museum.
- The Hestia Tapestry, 6th century, Byzantine Egypt, Dumbarton Oaks Collection.
- The Cloth of Saint Gereon – early 11th-century, the oldest European tapestry still extant.
- Tapestry of Creation, 11th-century, Spain. Large needlework hanging with religious scenes
- The Överhogdal tapestries – Viking hangings of 1040 to 1170.
- The Bayeux Tapestry is an embroidered cloth — not an actual tapestry — nearly 70 metres (230 ft) long, which depicts the events leading up to the Norman conquest of England, likely made in England — not Bayeux — in the 1070s
- The Apocalypse Tapestry depicts scenes from the Book of Revelation. It was woven between 1373 and 1382. Originally 140 m (459 ft), the surviving 100m are displayed in the Château d'Angers, in Angers.
- The six-part piece La Dame à la Licorne (The Lady and the Unicorn), stored in l'Hôtel de Cluny, Paris.
- The Devonshire Hunting Tapestries, four Flemish tapestries dating from the mid-fifteenth century depict men and women in fashionable dress of the early fifteenth century hunting in a forest. The tapestries formerly belonged to the Duke of Devonshire and are now in the Victoria and Albert Museum.
- The Justice of Trajan and Herkinbald, a tapestry dating from about 1450.
- The Triumph of Fame, a tapestry made in Flanders in the 1500s.

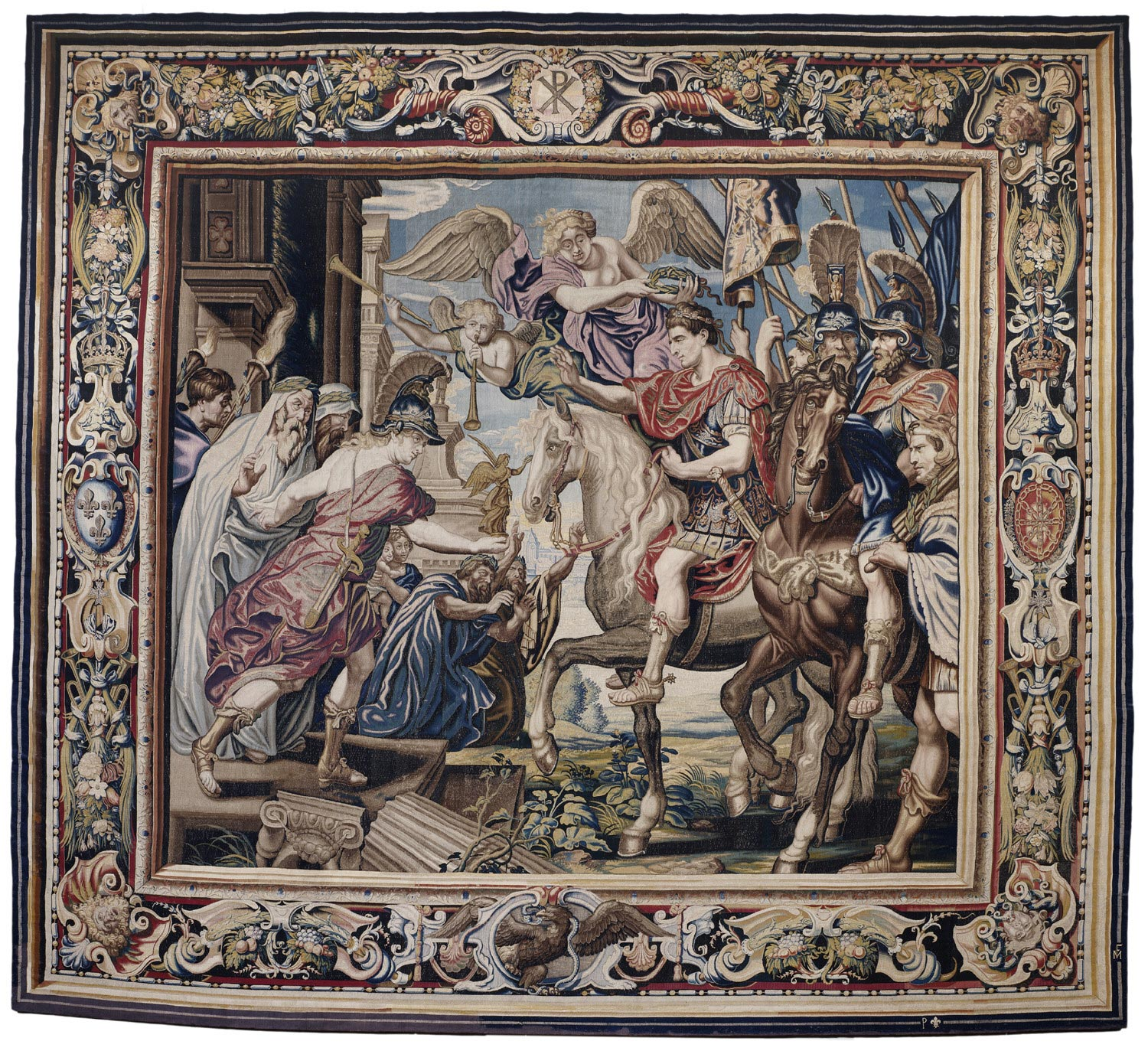
Constantine's Triumphal Entry into Rome, from The History of Constantine, designed by Peter Paul Rubens and Pietro da Cortona, 1622

- The Hunt of the Unicorn is a seven-piece tapestry from 1495 to 1505, currently displayed at The Cloisters, Metropolitan Museum of Art in New York.
- Les Chasses de Maximilien (The Hunts of Maximilian) is a series of twelve tapestries woven in Brussels after the designs of Bernard van Orley.
- The Life and Miracles of St Adelphus, a late 15th-century or early 16th-century cycle of tapestries (four surviving parts), possibly based on designs by Jost Haller, total length 20 m (66 ft), in the Église Saint-Pierre-et-Saint-Paul, Neuwiller-lès-Saverne.
- The tapestries for the Sistine Chapel, designed by Raphael in 1515–16, for which the Raphael Cartoons, or painted designs, also survive.
- The Jagiellonian tapestries, (mid 16th century) a collection of 134 tapestries at the Wawel Castle in Kraków, Poland displaying various religious, natural, and royal themes. These famous tapestries, created in Arras, were collected by Polish Kings Sigismund I the Old and Sigismund II Augustus, whose reigns were between 1506 and 1572.
- The Valois Tapestries are a cycle of 8 hangings depicting royal festivities in France in the 1560s and 1570s
- The History of Constantine, a series of tapestries designed by Peter Paul Rubens and Italian artist Pietro da Cortona in 1622.
- The Death of Polydorus, one of a set of seven tapestries showing a scene from the Iliad by Homer.
- The biggest collection of Flanders tapestry is in the Spanish royal collection, there is 8000 metres of historical tapestry from Flanders, as well as Spanish tapestries designed by Goya and others. There is a special museum in the Royal Palace of La Granja de San Ildefonso, and others are displayed in various historic buildings.
- Tentures des Indes is a ten-piece tapestry set made between 1708 and 1710 are the only intact collection in existence made by the famous French manufacturer the Gobelins Manufactory. They are still hanging in their original place in the Tapestry chamber at the Grandmaster's Palace, Valletta, Malta.
- The Pastoral Amusements, also known as "Les Amusements champêtres", a series of 8 Beauvais Tapestries designed by Jean-Baptiste Oudry between 1720 and 1730.
- The Prestonpans Tapestry is a 104 metres long embroidery which tells the story of Bonnie Prince Charlie and the Battle of Prestonpans.
- Le Bouquet (1951) by Marc Saint-Saens is among the best and most representative French tapestries of the fifties. It is a tribute to Saint-Saens's predilection for scenes from nature and rustic life.
- Triumph of Peace (1953) by Peter Colfs. On display in the United Nations Headquarters, Delegates' lobby of the General Assembly, it was at the time of production with 43.5 x 28.5 feet (13.3 m x 8.7 m) the largest mural tapestry in the world.
- Christ in Glory, (1962) for Coventry Cathedral designed by Graham Sutherland. Up until the 1990s this was the world's largest vertical tapestry.
- The World Trade Center Tapestry, a large 1973 tapestry by Joan Miró and Josep Royo.
- The Quaker Tapestry (1981–1989) is a modern set of embroidery panels that tell the story of Quakerism from the 17th century to the present day.
- The New World Tapestry is a 267 feet long embroidery, begun in the 1980s, which depicts the colonisation of the Americas between 1583 and 1648, which was displayed at the British Empire and Commonwealth Museum, now defunct.
- The Great Tapestry of Scotland is a modern series of embroidered cloths, made up of 160 hand stitched panels, depicting aspects of the history of Scotland from 8500 BC until 2013. At 143 metres (469 ft) long, it is the longest tapestry in the world.
