= Franses Tapestry Archive =

Coordinates: 51.5078°N 0.1380°W

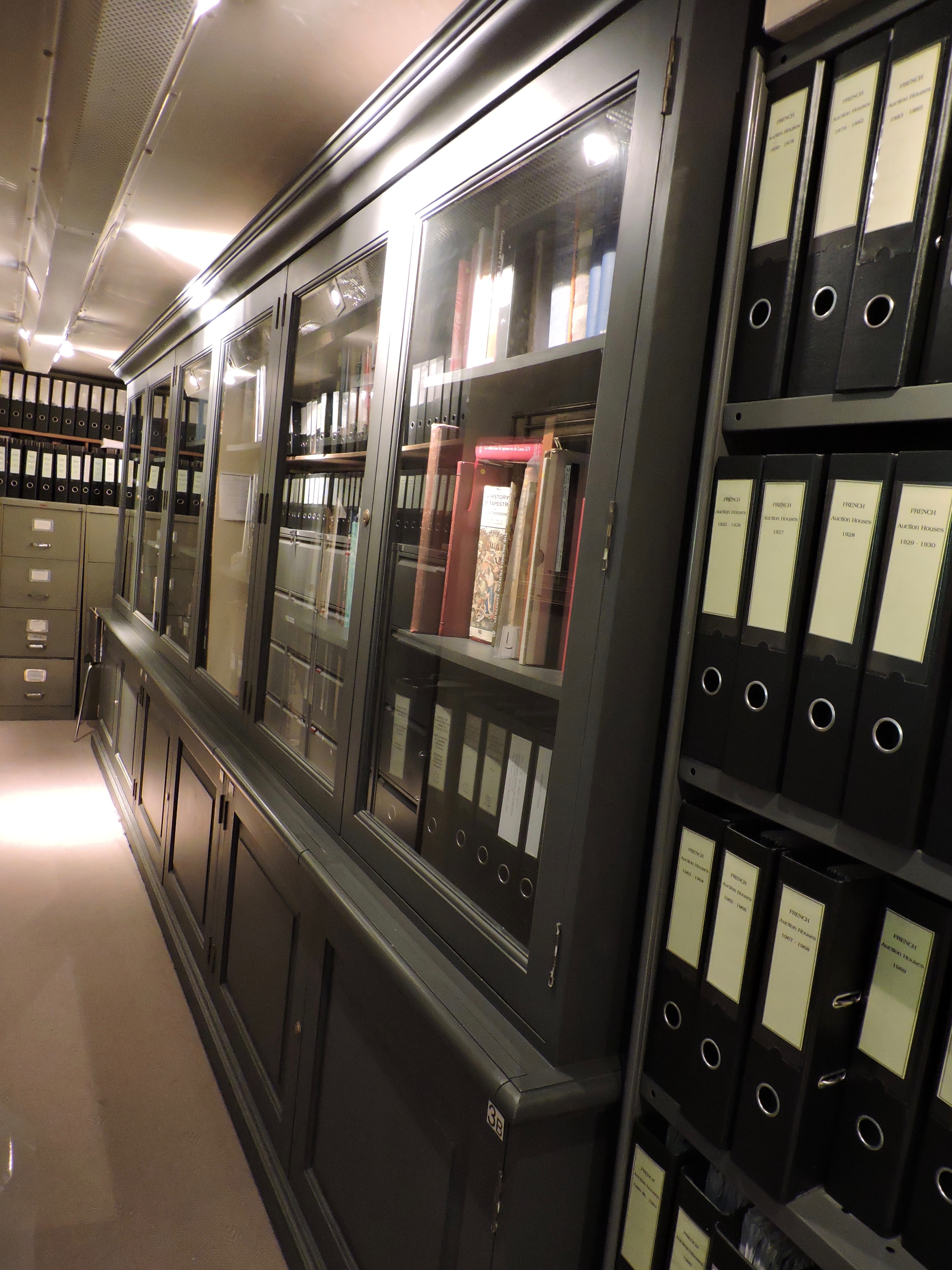
- Interior view of the Franses Tapestry Archive
- Location: St James's, London, United Kingdom
- Type: Research Archive
- Established: 1987

Collection
- Items collected: Visual records of tapestries, books, academic journals, periodicals, sale catalogues
- Size: 270,000+

Access and use
- Access requirements: Research for academic articles, books, exhibitions, research advancing knowledge or appreciation of tapestries

Other information
- Director: Simon Franses

The Franses Tapestry Archive and Library in London is devoted to the study of European tapestries and figurative textiles. It is the world’s largest academic research resource on the subject.

== History ==
Established in 1987, the archive was co-founded by Simon Franses, a director of the Franses Gallery and Tom Campbell, a tapestry scholar. After 7 years of full-time work, Dr Campbell moved to New York to take up a curatorial post at the Metropolitan Museum of Art. He went on to curate two landmark Tapestry exhibitions Tapestry in the Renaissance: Art and Magnificence (2002) and Tapestry in the Baroque: Threads of Splendor (2007). In 2008, he was appointed director of the museum.

The vast collection of images began to be collected by Dr Campbell with a team of research assistants, and was gathered from across Europe and America. The Archive has continued to expand over 29 years. It now holds over 240,000 visual records of European tapestries accessible by subject, date, country of manufacture and place of origin. These records have been collected and catalogued from several hundred museums, libraries, auction houses, trade and private collections, and allows precise identification of individual works (as well as visual reconstruction of dispersed sets of tapestries).

== Mission ==
- To collect images and data on every significant European tapestry and figurative textile.
- To identify, classify, cross-reference and conserve these.
- To increase knowledge by collecting books, related articles, and documentation on design, commissioning, origin, production, use, value, provenance.
- To increase appreciation and understanding of this art form.

== Archive ==
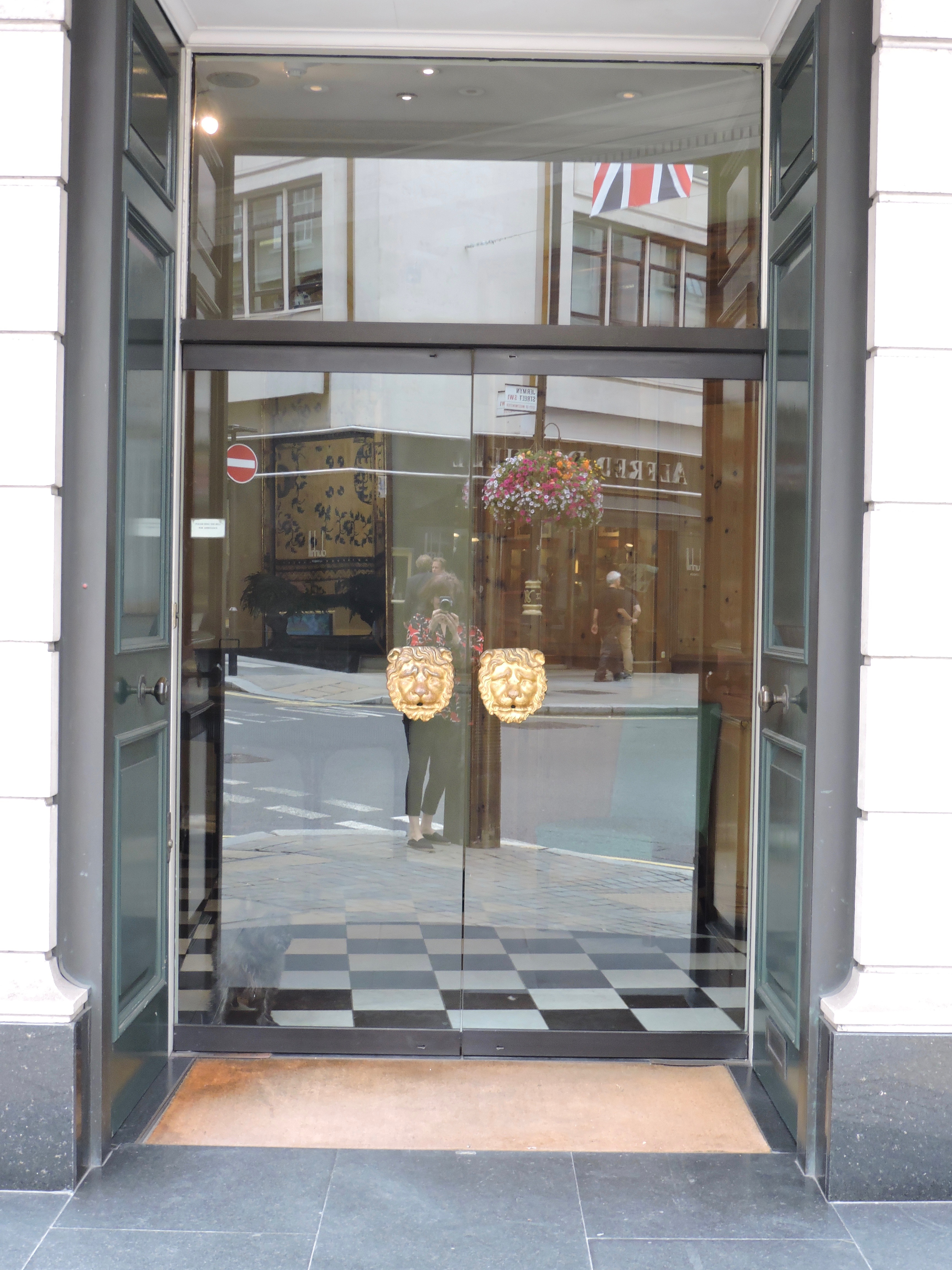
Exterior of the Franses Tapestry Archive

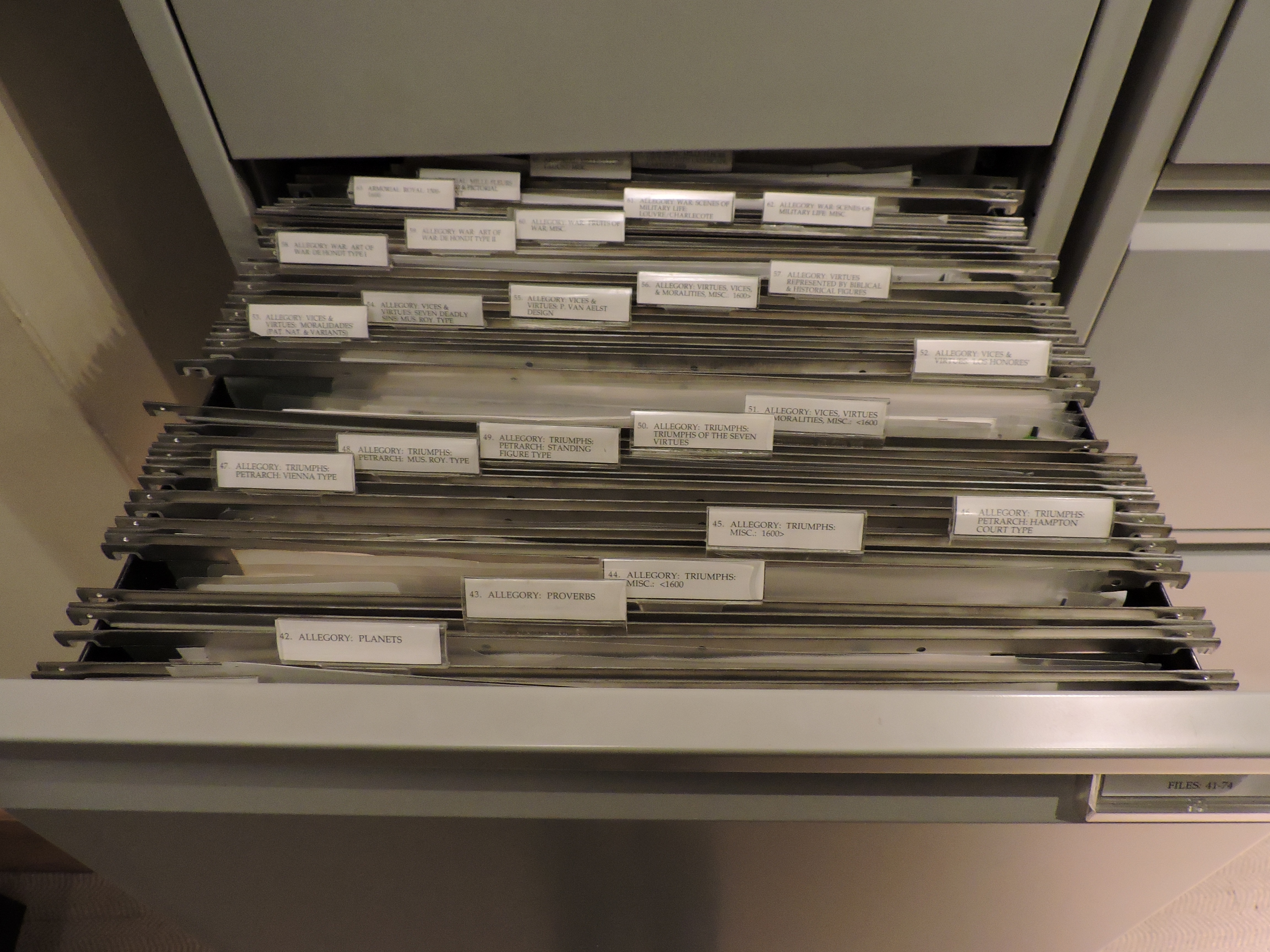
Drawer from the Archive Subject Catalogue

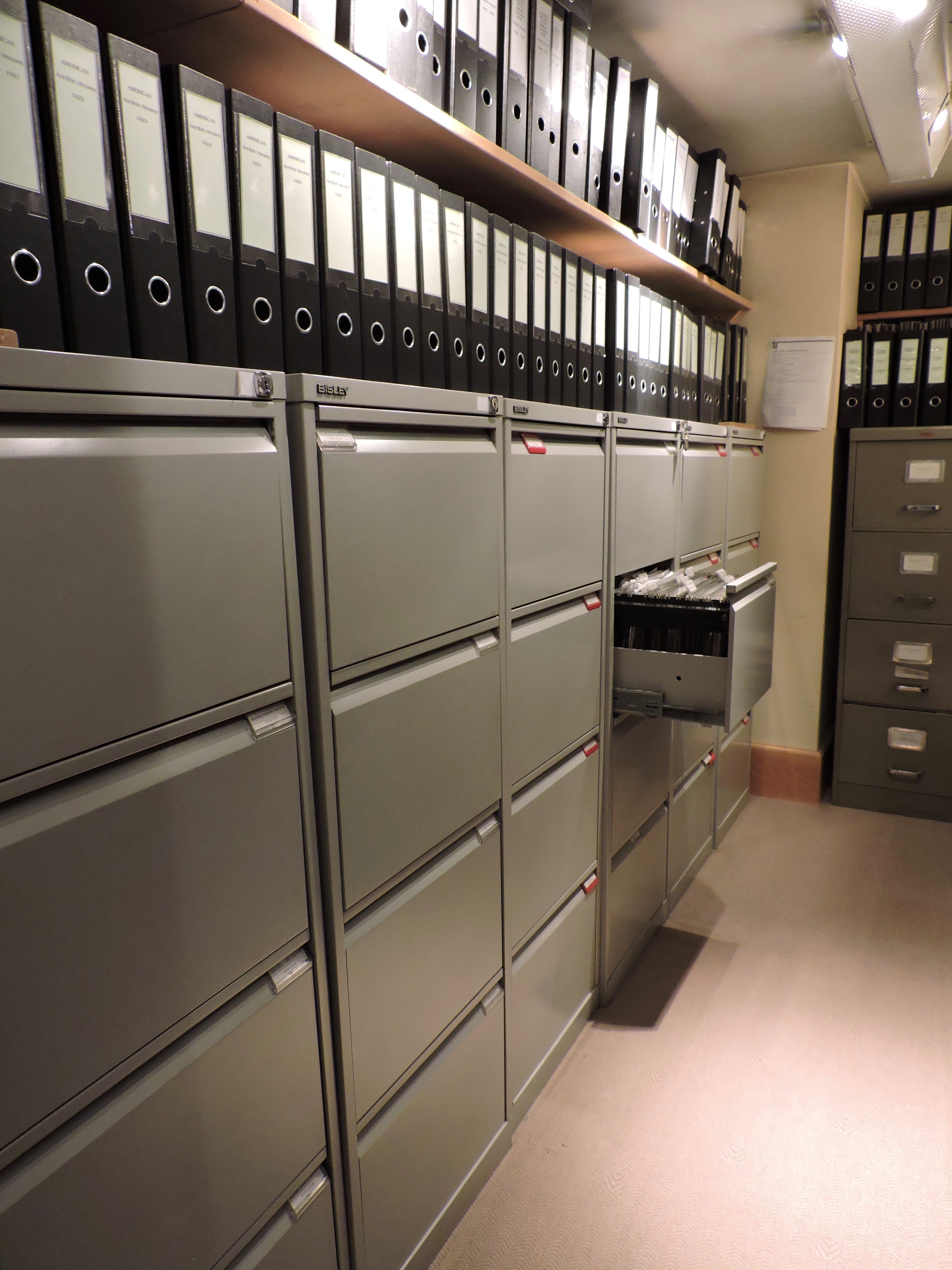
Interior view of the Franses Tapestry Archive showing subject drawers

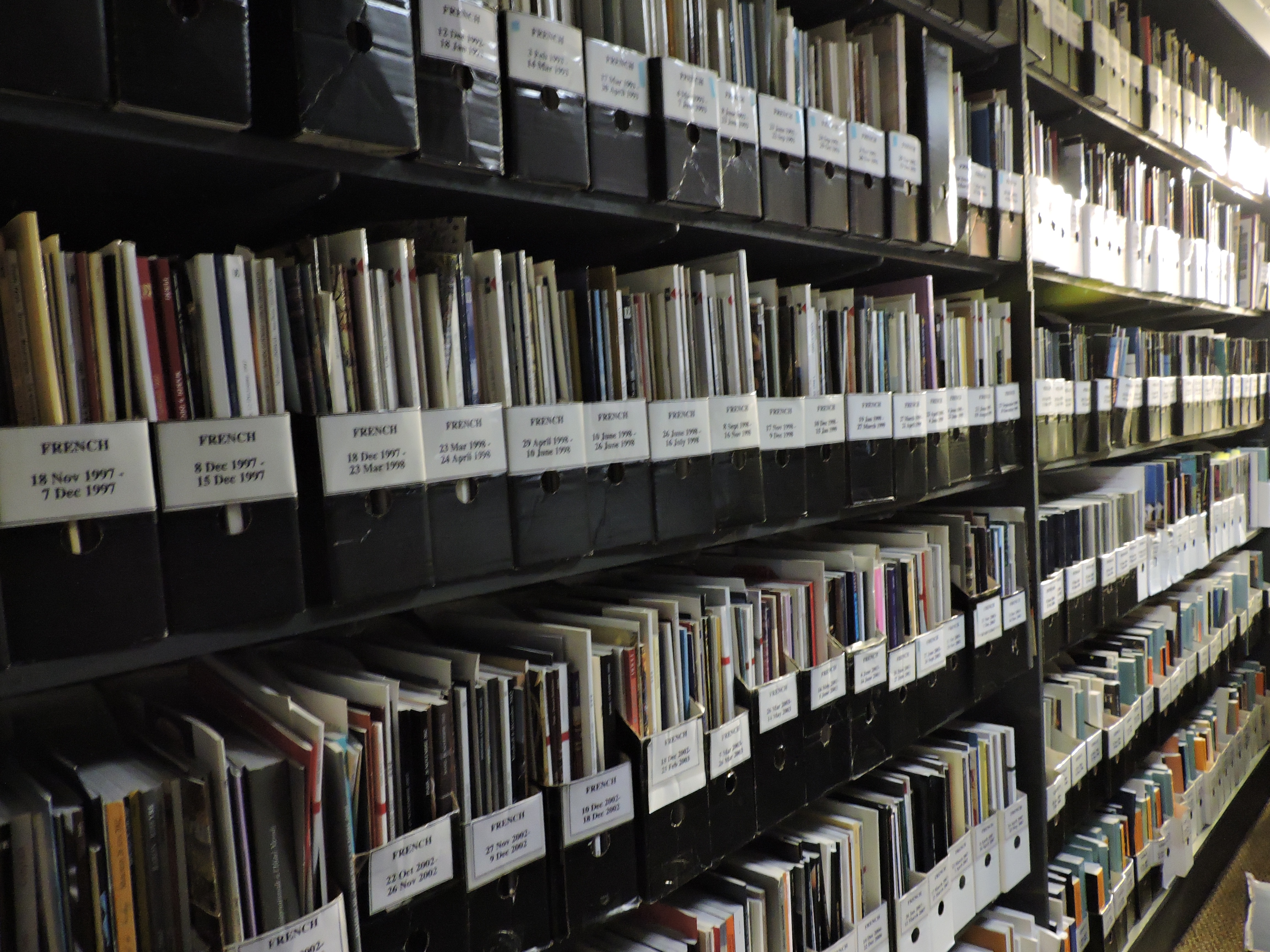
Interior view of the Franses Tapestry Archive showing French Sales catalogues

The images are stored under almost 900 main headings from Landmark Series of European Tapestries to more modest works, altar frontal, table carpets, cushions and upholstery.

Tapestry Series Title	Century	Subject	Archive Ref	Notes
The Beaufort Arms	14th	Armorial	68	
Apocalypse	14th	Religious	434/435	Château d'Angers
Nine Heroes	15th	History/Religious	145	
Saint Piat and Saint Eleutherius	15th	Religious	430/436	Tournai Cathedral
Devonshire Hunting Tapestries	15th	Hunting	305	
The Justice of Trajan and Herkenbald	15th	History	131	Wikicommons
The Caesar Tapestries	15th	History	117	-
Life of Saint Peter	15th	Religious	438	-
History of Troy	15th	History	260	
The Hunt of the Unicorn	15th	Allegory	4	
The Lady and the Unicorn	16th	Allegory	4	
The Honours	16th	Allegory	52	
Acts of the Apostles	16th	Religious	424	Vatican Museums
The Grotesques of Leo X	16th	Mythology	82	Vatican Museums
The Hunts of Maximlillien	16th	Hunting	746	Louvre
The Passion	16th	Religious	407	
Scuola Nouva	16th	Religious	400	Vatican Museums
Deeds of Scipio	16th	History	136	-
The Story of Scipio	16th	History	133	
The Seven Deadly Sins	16th	Religious	54	
The Story of Joshua	16th	Religious	368	
The Story of Joseph	16th	Religious	364	-
The Story of Saint Paul	16th	Religious	440	
The Story of Abraham	16th	Religious	351	
The Jagiellonian Tapestries	16th	Various	Various	Wikicommons
The Battle of Pavia	16th	History	162	Museo di Capodimonte
The Conquest of Tunis|	16th	History	154	
Early History of Rome	16th	History	131	-
Fables of Ovid "Poesia"	16th	Mythology	252	
The Valois Tapestries	16th	Courtly	279	Uffizi
The Armada	16th/17th	History	153	
The Story of Vulcan	17th	Mythology	534	
Hero and Leander	17th	Mythology	530	Wikicommons
The Story of Queen Artemesia	17th	History	675	
The Triumph of the Eucharist	17th	Religious	336	
The Story of Constantine	17th	History	676	
Story of Achilles	17th	Mythology	231	
Decius Mus	17th	History	125	
Stories from the Old Testament	17th	Religious	693	-
The Story of Alexander	17th	History	723	-
The Royal Residences	17th	Hunting	700	-
The Gallery of Apollo	17th	Portraits	727	Wikicommons
The Elements	17th	Allegory	697	-
Histoire du Roi	17th	History	726	-
New Indies	18th	Allegory	730	-
Hunts of Louis XV	18th	Hunting	745	-
Don Quixote	18th	Myth/Literature	275	
Fragments from the Opera	18th	Myth/Literature	742	
Holy Grail Tapestries	19th	Myth/Literature	Morris	

The Collection includes:

- Visual records: 240,000 +
- Reference Books: 2,760
- Articles: 3,600
- Catalogues of major collections: 450
- Sale catalogues and periodicals: 20,000

== Other archives, collections and photos ==
=== Institutions ===
- The V & A Marillier Tapestry Subject Catalogue, fifty volumes of script and photographs, donated to the Nation in 1945
- Musée Royaux d’art et d’histoire, Brussels, Archive of Flemish Tapestries
- The Burrell Collection, Glasgow
- Musée des Arts Décoratifs, Paris

=== Private collections ===
- Donald King, donated by Monique King
- Edith Standen
- Jack Franses

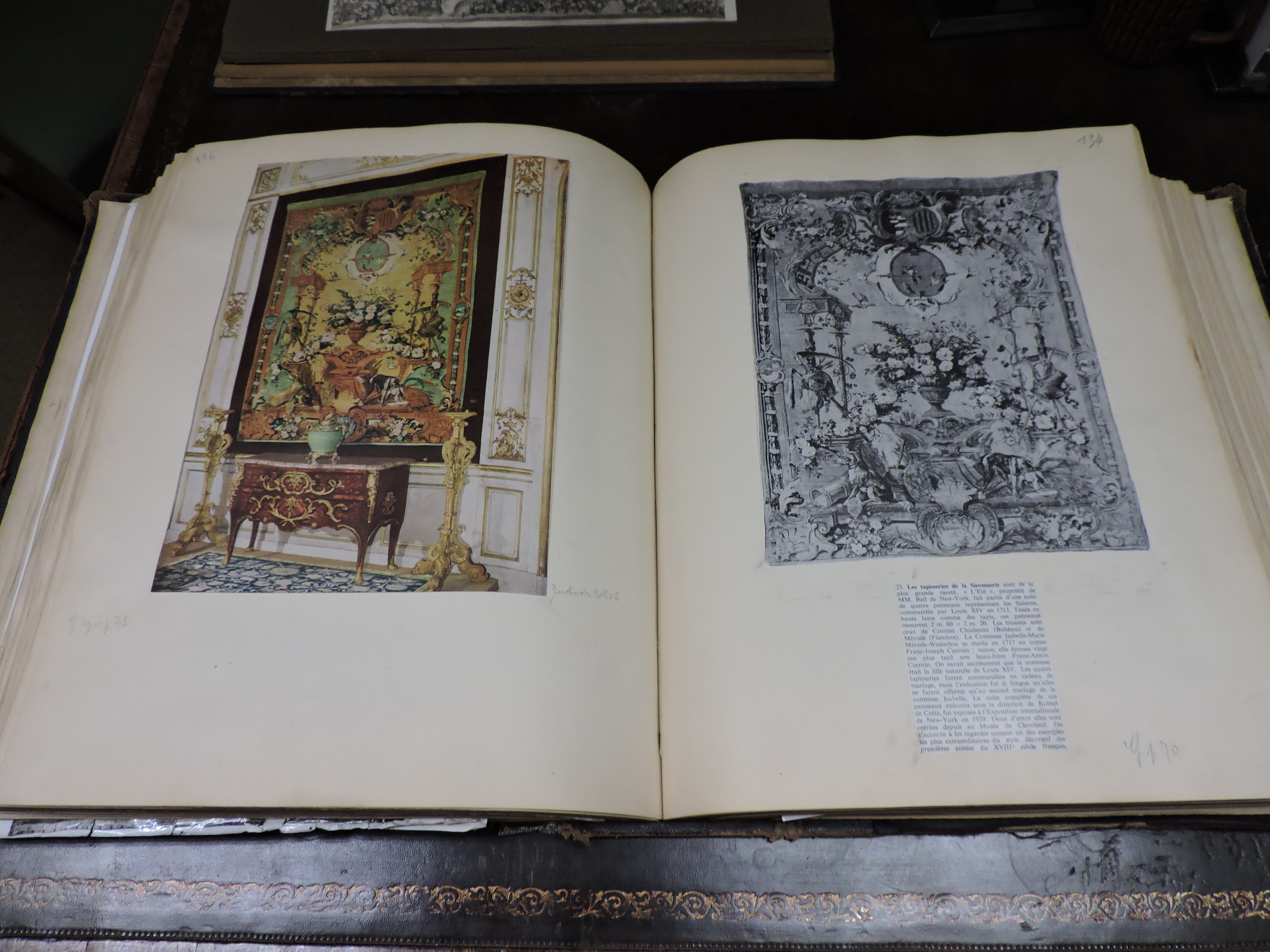
Pages from the former Hamot, Paris Album showing "L'Été" an extremely rare Savonnerie Pictorial Tapestry.

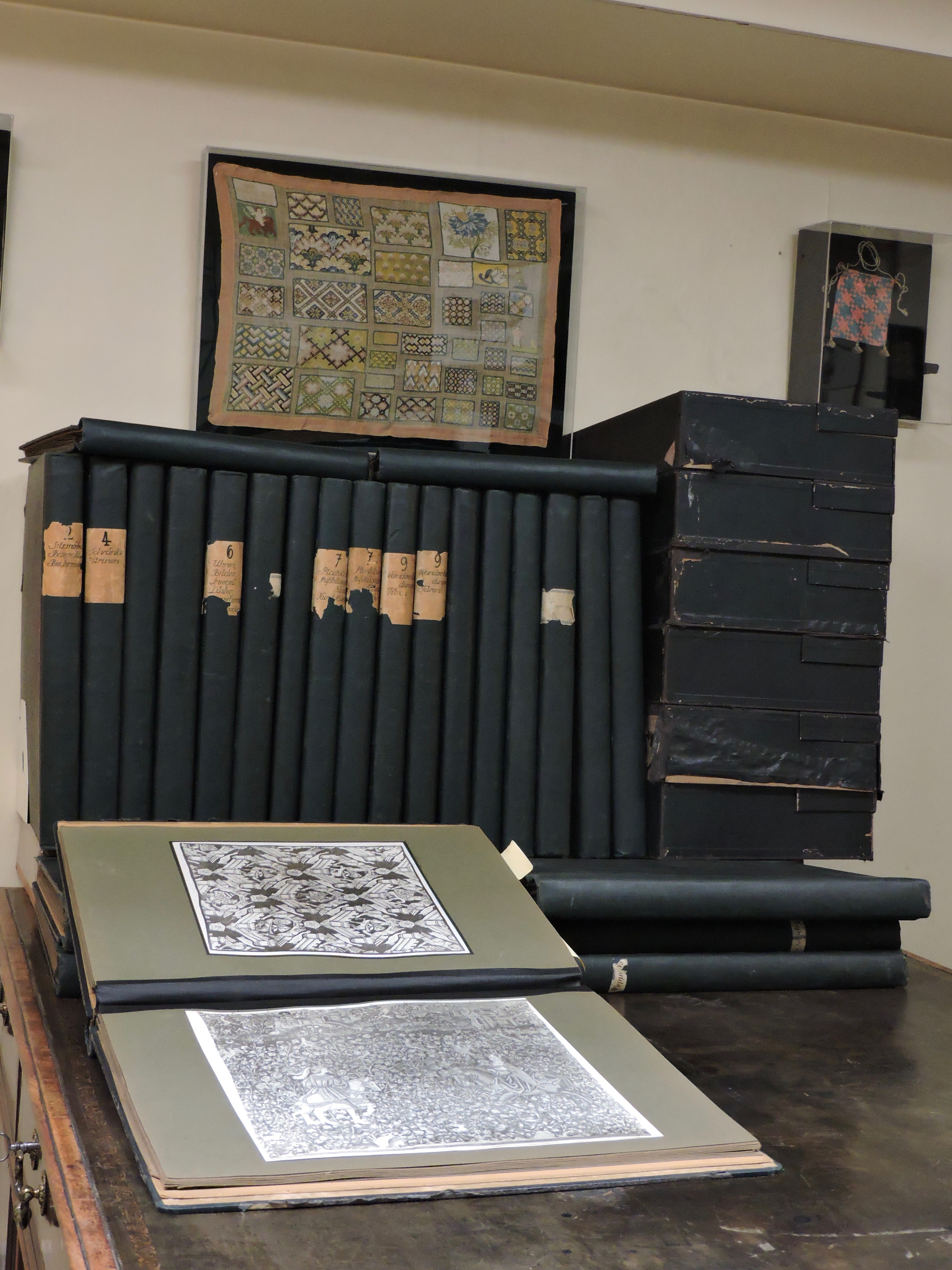
Bernheimer, Munich Archive of Tapestry photographs.

=== Galleries ===
- Bernheimer, Munich
- Duveen, New York
- S Franses, London
- French & Company, New York
- Hamot, Paris
- C John, London
- Mayorcas, London
- Perez, London
- Rosenberg & Steibel, New York
- Seligman, Paris

== Research projects ==
The Archive has undertaken a number of research projects. A joint survey with the National Trust of the Tapestries in their 200 historic houses was carried out. Assistance is given to academics and scholars and where copyright is owned, images are made available for publication.

A project with Glasgow City Art Gallery and Museum assembling documentation from the Archive on Sir William Burrell’s collection of medieval tapestries. The Burrell Collection has appointed two international tapestry scholars to catalogue this Tapestry collection. The archive assisted with the academic research and securing loans for the "History Woven in Threads" an Exhibition of Medieval and Renaissance Tapestries held in 2014 at Palace of the Grand Dukes of Lithuania, Vilnius.

=== Surveys ===
- National Trust Survey
- US Public Collections Survey

== Lost and stolen ==
Several missing or stolen pieces have been recovered through the Archive – in 1993 two Gobelins Tapestries stolen from the Institute of Fine Arts, New York, were located and returned, and a Brussels Tapestry stolen from North Mymms Park, England. In 2001 The Art Loss Register deposited images of missing or stolen tapestries and textiles.

== Other uses of the documentation ==
The documentation is also used to provide appraisals for government indemnity in the case of inter-museum loans, grant-giving bodies and Acceptance in Lieu.
