= Devonshire Hunting Tapestries =

Series of four 15th-century tapestries

The Devonshire Hunting Tapestries
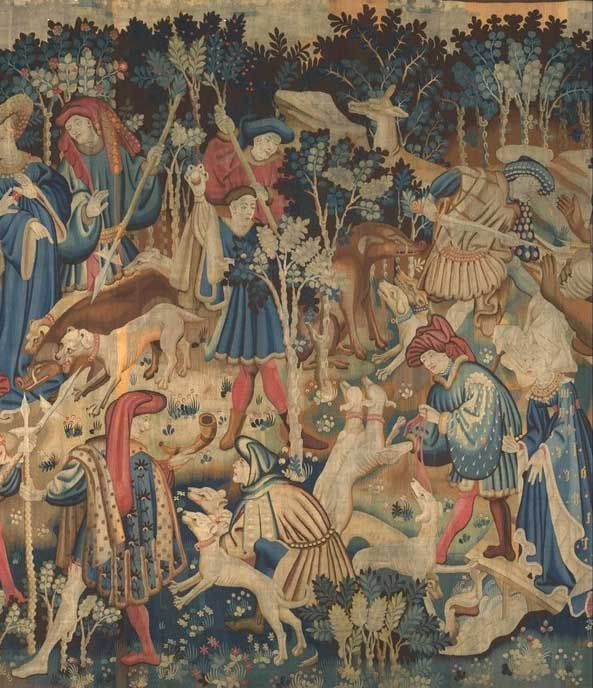
- Detail from the Boar and Bear Hunt
- Year: c. 1420-1450
- Medium: Tapestry
- Dimensions: variable, over 13 ft high and 133 ft wide in total
- Location: Victoria & Albert Museum, London
- Accession: T.204-1957

The Devonshire Hunting Tapestries are a group of four medieval tapestries, probably woven in Arras, Artois, France, between about 1430 and 1450. The tapestries are known as Boar and Bear Hunt, Falconry, Swan and Otter Hunt, and Deer Hunt. These enormous works, each over 13 feet tall and altogether about 133 feet wide, depict men and women in fashionable dress of the early fifteenth century hunting in forests. The tapestries formerly belonged to the Dukes of Devonshire, and were hung on the walls at Hardwick Hall in Derbyshire. In 1957, they became the property of the British Government in the tax settlement after the death of the 10th Duke of Devonshire. The tapestries were then allocated to the Victoria and Albert Museum in London, where they remain. Few fifteenth-century tapestries of this size and grandeur still exist, which is what makes the Devonshire Hunting Tapestries so exceedingly rare.

== History ==
Tapestries were a popular luxury good that used visual imagery to entertain and delight the audiences of aristocratic households. The wealthy used tapestries to cover entire walls, which had a practical use because they aided in insulation during colder months.

The sport of hunting was a common subject in tapestries as well as a favored activity amongst the elite members of society. Hunting was both a stylized sport and an important source of meat highly prized by the nobility. The sport also reinforced aristocratic ideas of class, since the elite form of hunting was only available for the landowner. Hunting was so prized by the nobility that there were forest laws, to protect the landowners's rights against poaching. Any rule-breaking poachers faced expensive fines or worse. In particular, deer and boar were protected by forest law in England, and in Portugal, bears were protected.

Royal hunts were not an everyday occurrence and were more of a performance. Though hunting was primarily reserved for members of the court, they were often not the ones engaging in the act of locating, chasing, and capturing the animals. The nobility often had huntsmen who would routinely hunt and bring back meat for the royals to enjoy, but who also located and corralled live animals for the royals to then hunt. The Devonshire Hunting Tapestries show various animal hunts, but the nobles who take place in them are in their finest dress, which they might not in reality have worn for such an activity. The four hunting tapestries are therefore not the most accurate representation of hunting, but instead depict the fantasy of a noble, leisurely pastime enjoyed by the wealthy. The tapestries reinforce the hierarchy of class and humankind’s dominance over animals.

== Production ==
The tapestries would have been produced by a large workshop of skilled weavers, working to designs made by an artist. Neither the designer nor the workshop can be identified, as is common at this period. Though considered as a set, the four tapestries were created at different times. The specific style of dress in each tapestry can help to identify the time it was made. The Boar and Bear Hunt shows costume c. 1425-30. Both Falconry and the Swan and Otter Hunt show costume c. 1430s. The Deer Hunt primarily shows costume c. 1440-1450, but with two costumes c. 1435, indicating that the piece was likely made in the 1440s. Furthermore, the tapestries all vary in size.

The Devonshire Hunting Tapestries were created on two types of looms: high-warp loom and low-warp loom. Weavers use an illustration, known as a cartoon, as the design reference for the tapestry. For low-warp loom, the cartoon was below the threads, allowing the weaver to easily look at it. For high-warp loom, the cartoon was displayed away from the loom, requiring weavers to be familiar with the work to not constantly be looking away from the tapestry to the cartoon. Low-warp loom can create errors since the weaver has to work in reverse. Such is the case with the Boar and Bear Hunt, considered low-warp, which has errors of reversed inscriptions and two left-handed men, probably unintended. Falconry and Otter and Swan are considered high-warp.

== Description ==
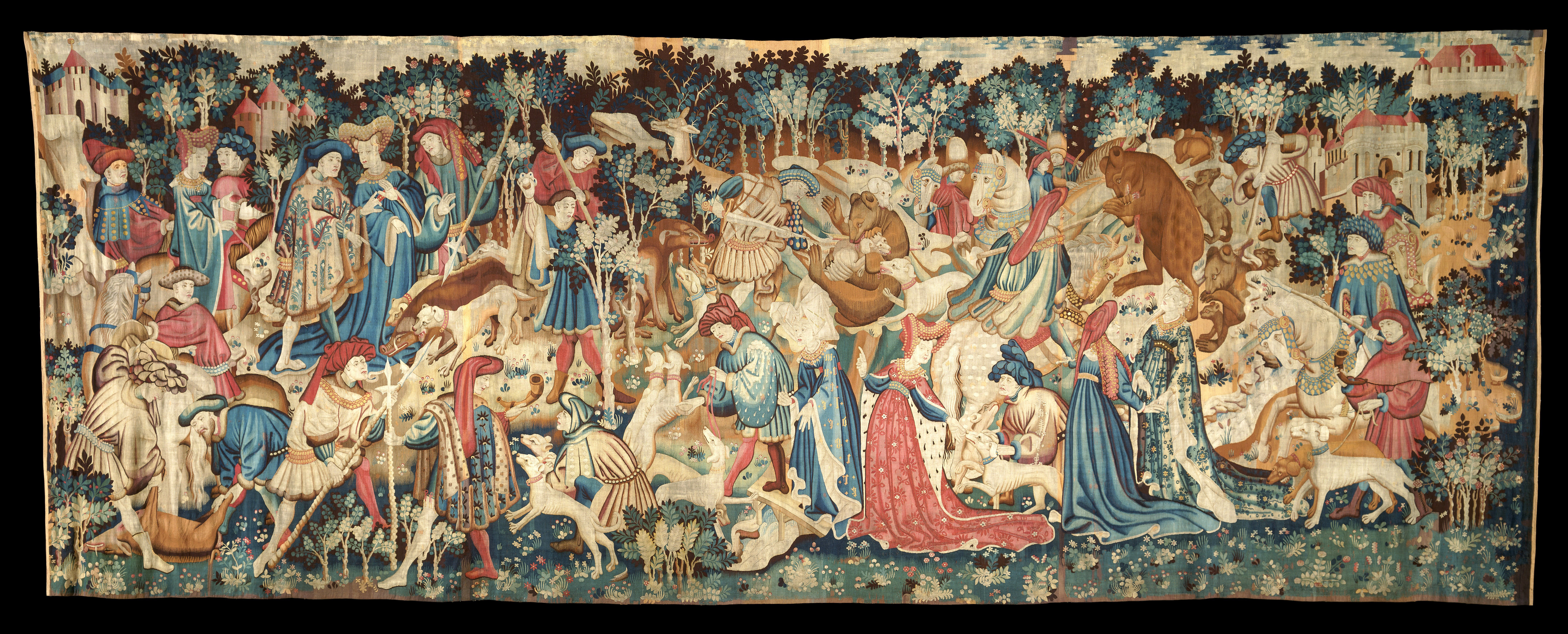
Boar and Bear Hunt

=== Boar and Bear Hunt ===
The Boar and Bear Hunt is 13 ft 3.5 in by 33 ft 6 in. On the left side, the boar hunts take place and in the centre and the right side, the bear hunts take place. The men are shown carrying spears, which have cross-bars designed to stop the charge of the boar and keep its tusks at a safe distance. The bears are also hunted on foot with spears. The lady crossing the stream in the centre foreground has "Monte le Desire" inscribed on her flowing sleeve. However, weaving on a low-warp loom has reversed the letters.

The boar was viewed as the exact opposite of the deer in the Middle Ages, with the boar considered more beastly. Boars were known to attack hunting dogs. Though boar hunting was not as highly regarded as deer hunting, the meat was still desired for banquets and celebrations. Bear hunting was not for meat, but rather to prevent attacks on farm animals, and for fur. Hunters and their hounds might seek out the bear in its cave, as can be seen on the right side of the tapestry where a bear and its cubs reside in a cave. However by this period, bears were rare in Flanders, and extinct in Britain.

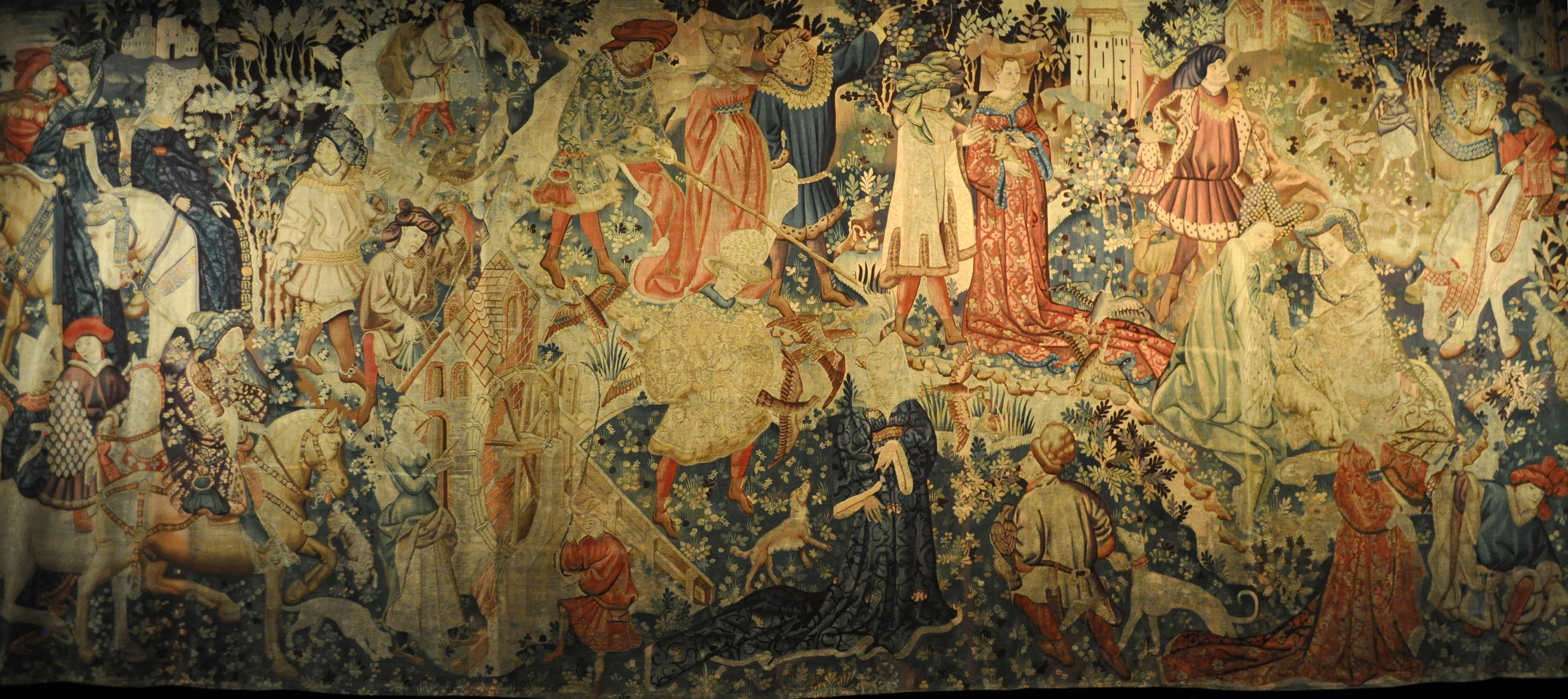
Falconry

=== Falconry ===
Falconry is the tallest tapestry at 14 ft 6 in by 35 ft 3.5 in, and is missing a section on the left. Intended to be read from left to right, the scene shows the sport of falconry and it is the only tapestry of the four that follows on one hunt throughout the piece. On the left, nobles ride horses with hawks perched on arms as they approach a mill.The horses’ trappings have “M” repeated on them, though it is unknown if this was intended to identify the tapestry’s commissioner.

Great attention is given to the etiquette of falconry including the loosing, the flushing out, and the recall. Towards the centre of the tapestry, the nobles take to foot and the falcons are set upon ducks in a stream. This is the loosing, when the falcons are freed from their trappings, such as leashes and hoods, and set upon the prey. The dogs in the tapestry partake in the flushing out of the prey. On the right, the hawks are being recalled. A man towards the top of the composition holds a v-shaped lure in the air to call back the hawk. In the bottom right, another man bends to grab his lure, with a successfully caught duck in his other hand.

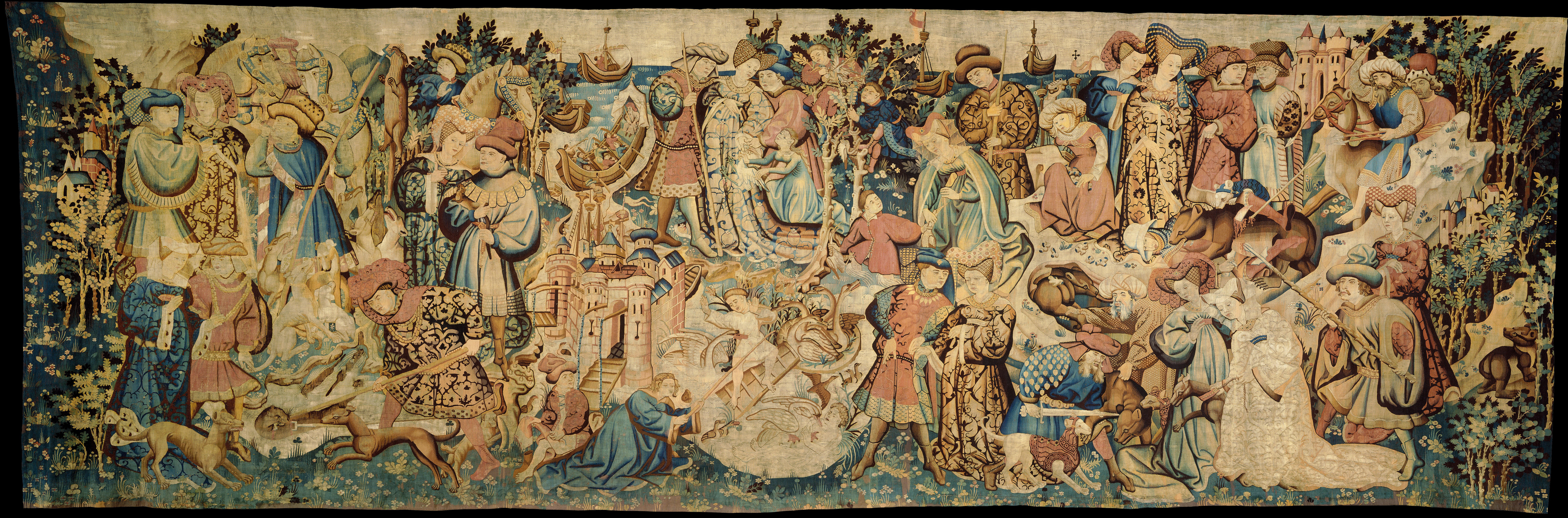
Swan and Otter Hunt

=== Swan and Otter Hunt ===
The Swan and Otter Hunt is the widest tapestry at 13 ft 11 in by 36 ft 7.5 in. The landscape includes both land, in the foreground and middle ground, and sea, in the background. On the left, two otters are hunted: one is pinned to the ground towards the bottom and one is hoisted into the air towards the top. Towards the centre of the composition, next to a small-scale castle that represents a port, young boys plunder a swan’s nest. Directly above, another pair of boys climb a tree to attack a heron’s nest. There is another hunt on the right side of the tapestry involving bears and hunters riding on a camel. These hunters have been identified by the V&A as Saracens and the camel is thought to be a fictional addition.

In the Middle Ages, otters were an annoyance to fishermen and thus exterminated through hunting. Nobles did not necessarily partake in otter hunts nor consume otter meat, but did like to adorn themselves with the furs. Swan meat was consumed by the nobility, especially the meat of young swans, or cygnets. Swans were so highly coveted by royalty that they had special farms to hold swans called swanneries.

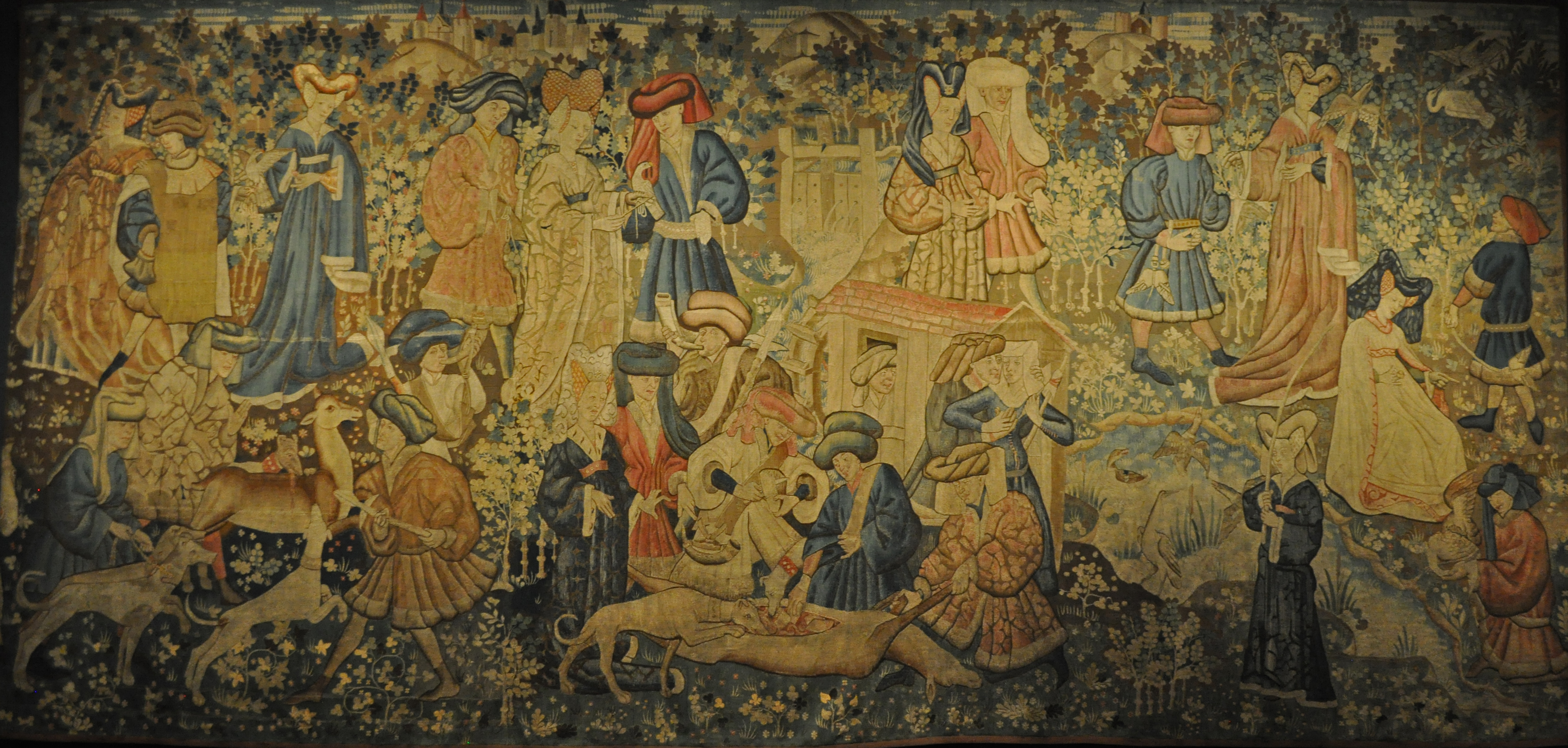
Deer Hunt

=== Deer Hunt ===
The Deer Hunt is the smallest of the four tapestries at 13 ft 4.5 in by 28 ft 5.5 in. Woolley points out that the finished tapestry is the result of several reworkings and additions. The reweaving has diminished the quality of the tapestry. On the left side of the tapestry, a deer is actively being hunted by men and hounds. To the right of that deer in the centre, a recently slain deer lies on its back, with its stomach cut open. The hounds are feasting on the deer as their reward, a hunting ritual called the curée, or cure. A small mill next to a stream divides the tapestry, and on the right there are several figures engaged in the sport of hawking. Also in the centre of the work, next to the cure, is a man of the court flirtatiously wrapped around the wife of the miller. In addition to hunting and hawking, members of the court are socializing in their finest dress, adding to the idealized nature of the scene.

The deer pictured are specifically red deer, which was one of three deer species in medieval England alongside fallow deer and roe deer. At the time the tapestry was created, deer-hunting was restricted to a very few in England.

== Provenance ==
The history of ownership of the tapestries from their creation to the mid-sixteenth century is not known. The Countess of Shrewsbury, Bess of Hardwick, is one of the earliest suggested owners of the set. In the 1590s, Hardwick Hall in Derbyshire was built and became the home for the extremely wealthy widow, whose inheritance passed to the line of her second husband, who eventually became the Cavendish Dukes of Devonshire. Linda Woolley suggests that Bess came to own the tapestries via her last husband George Talbot, 6th Earl of Shrewsbury, who had been married to the countess before he died in 1590. A 1601 inventory identified a set of four tapestries with descriptions matching those of the Devonshire Hunting Tapestries. According to the inventory, the tapestries had been cut into smaller pieces. The Victoria & Albert Museum suggests that the four tapestries remained at Hardwick Hall over the following centuries. William George Spencer Cavendish, 6th Duke of Devonshire used the cut tapestries to insulate the Long Gallery at Hardwick Hall in the 1840s. During a visit to Hardwick in 1899, Arthur Long convinced the seventh Duke of Devonshire to let the Victoria & Albert Museum restore the tapestries. The restoration began in 1900 and ended in 1910. The tapestries were then brought to the main home of the Dukes of Devonshire, Chatsworth House, and exhibited periodically. In 1957, the tenth Duke of Devonshire died and the tapestries passed to the V&A.
