= The Triumph of the Church (Rubens) =

Painting by Peter Paul Rubens

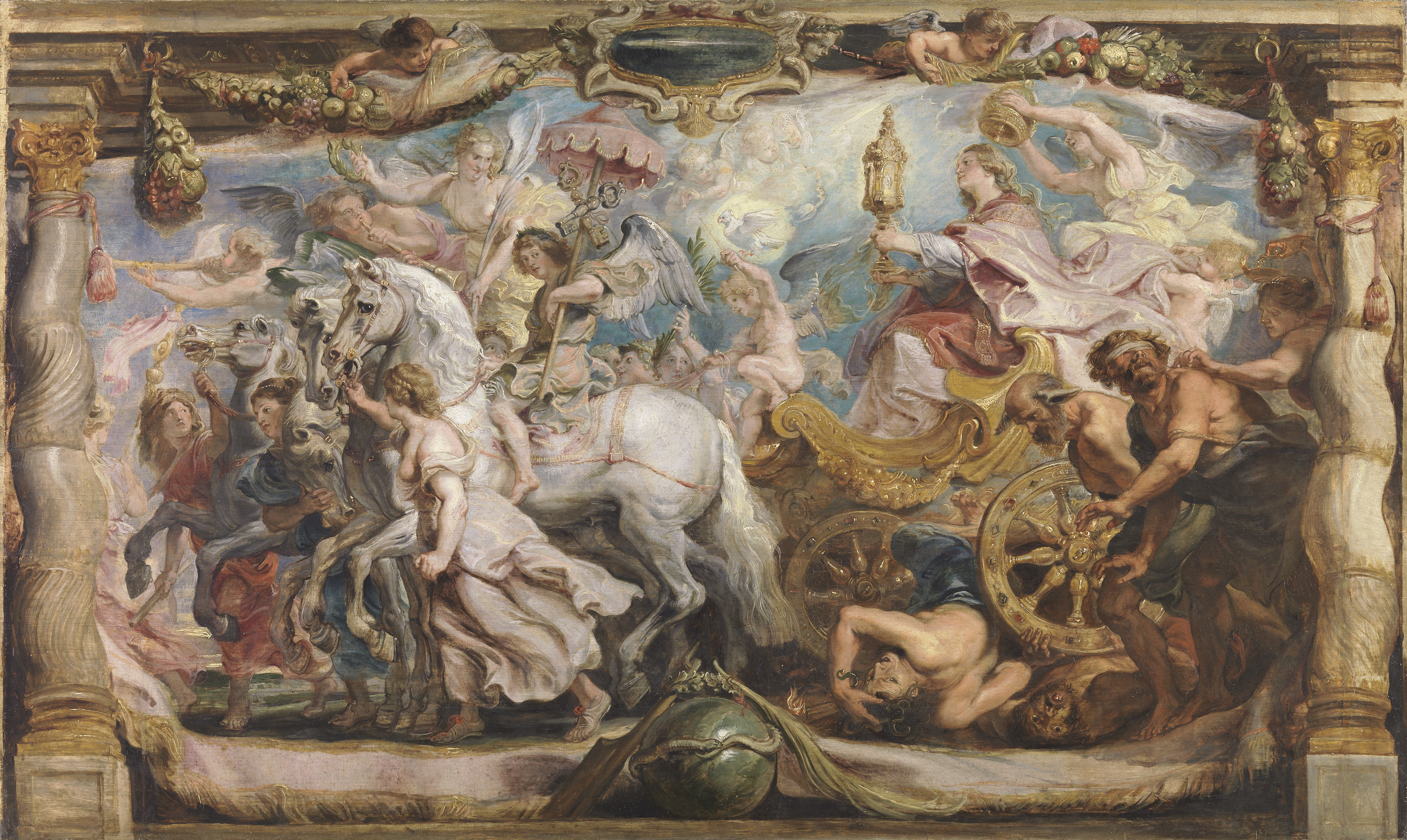
The Triumph of the Church (c. 1625) by Rubens

The Triumph of the Church or The Triumph of the Church over Fury, Discord and Hatred is a c.1625 oil-on-panel painting by Peter Paul Rubens, now in the Museo del Prado in Madrid. Its dimensions are 63.5 cm (25 in) x 105 cm (41.3 in).

== History ==
It forms part of a series of allegorical paintings praising the sacrament of the Eucharist, the Catholic faith and the Counter Reformation and attacking heresy and the Protestant Reformation. They were first conceived as modellos for monumental tapestries to be displayed during major festivals such as Corpus Christi at the Convent of Las Descalzas Reales in Madrid. The paintings, completed between 1622 and 1625, were commissioned by Isabel Clara Eugenia, daughter of Philip II of Spain and governor of the Spanish Netherlands, which was not only Rubens' homeland but also included the Brussels tapestry factories. The tapestries after the paintings were produced between 1627 and 1632 in these factories and in the studio of Jan II Raes, before being sent to the Spanish court. Some of the tapestries show Rubens introduced changes in his final drawings

The other subjects in the cycle were The Triumph of Divine Love, The Meeting between Abraham and Melchizedek, The Victory of Virtue over Heresy, The Victory of the Eucharist over Idolatry and The Defenders of the Eucharist. They were mainly on allegorical themes with strong propagandistic and doctrinal subtext, along with some on Old Testament episodes. The Triumph of the Church was probably one of the central works in the cycle and the resulting tapestry was probably the biggest in the set with the most complex themes and composition.
