= The History of Constantine =

Tapestry by Peter Paul Rubens and Pietro da Cortona

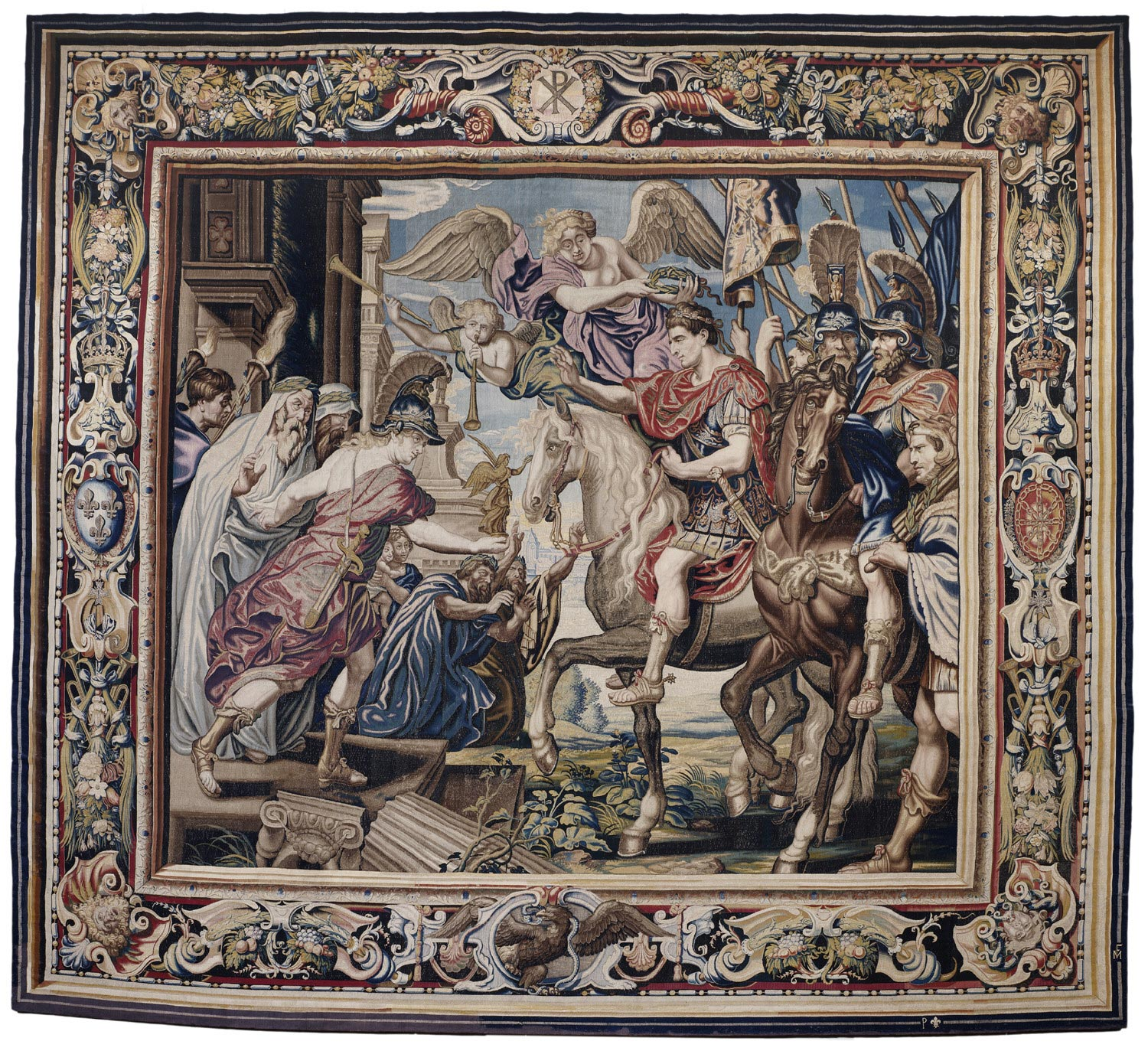
- Artist: Peter Paul Rubens, Pietro da Cortona
- Year: 1622-40
- Type: oil paintings, tapestries

The History of Constantine is a series of tapestries designed by the Flemish artist Peter Paul Rubens and Italian artist Pietro da Cortona depicting the life of Constantine I, the first Christian Roman emperor. In 1622, Rubens painted the first twelve oil sketches that were used as guides, and the tapestries themselves were woven in the workshop of Marc Comans and François de la Planche in the Faubourg Saint-Marcel in Paris by 1625, transforming each small sketch (perhaps two feet per side) into a sumptuous creation of wool, silk, and gold and silver threads that could easily fill a wall. An additional five designs were painted by Cortona in 1630 and woven in the atelier of Cardinal Francesco Barberini in Rome over the next decade.

The tapestries, once separated, are now split between the Philadelphia Museum of Art and Mobilier National, and the oil sketches are widely dispersed, in several countries.

== History ==
The series was commissioned in 1622 when Rubens was in Paris discussing the Marie de' Medici cycle of paintings commissioned for the Luxembourg Palace by Marie de Médicis. Although the popular consensus has long been that the tapestries were commissioned by Louis XIII, based upon a 1626 letter by Rubens, art historians have begun to question this conclusion in recent decades. New evidence, such the fact that the designs were listed as the property of de la Planche upon his death, establishing a weak form of copyright, has muddied the issue. One theory is that Rubens only cited the king as the commissioner of the tapestries in the aforementioned letter in order to increase their perceived importance because his payment was overdue. Financial evidence strongly indicates that Rubens himself ordered the cartoons from which the tapestries would be woven at the personal expense of 500 livres, making him a primary mover behind the project.

Louis XIII's lack of investment in the project is indicated by the fact that he immediately gave the first seven tapestries completed to the papal legate Cardinal Francesco Barberini in 1625, even though Barberini was at first unwilling to accept so princely a gift. Barberini eventually acquiesced, and commissioned an additional five tapestries from Pietro da Cortona, another Baroque master who happened to be the artistic director of Barberini's newly founded atelier. He repeated only one design from the Rubens set, the apparition of the cross. Cortona also designed several smaller tapestries such as portieres and a baldachin to furnish an entire room, and painted the ceiling of the salon where they were displayed. The dossal he designed, featuring an immense golden statue of Constantine, hung behind the throne of Urban VIII, Barberini's uncle.

The life of the first Christian monarch would have special relevance for a king whose own father experienced such a notable conversion to Catholicism. While the subject matter could plausibly have been chosen by Louis XIII himself, it also may have been selected by Comans and de la Planche to appeal to him and earn Rubens a royal appointment. Rubens himself may have had a hand in deciding the theme, since his intense study of the classical era, including the acquisitions of many antiquities, made him very well suited to tackle the historical intricacies of the subject.

Rubens drew on Cardinal Cesare Baronio's Annales Ecclesiastici (1588–1607) for inspiration and historical detail. Baronio based his writings on the contemporary accounts of Eusebius. This third-hand information, coupled with his deep historical knowledge, enabled Rubens to craft scenes that were so accurate that Louis' inspectors lauded him for portraying so precisely "even the nails of the boots".

Rubens' designs proved highly popular and were woven several times by the Comans-La Planche workshop over the next decades, although they tended to evolve away from the originals. Cortona's tapestries were only woven once. The sole complete set remained with the Barberini collection in Rome until 1889. The tapestries were split up and passed through various hands before being reunited by the Samuel H. Kress Foundation and given to the Philadelphia Museum of Art in 1959. The sketches remain widely scattered, many of them in private hands.

== Rubens' designs ==
=== Constantius appoints Constantine as his successor ===
sketch: Sydney, Art Gallery of New South Wales, 14.4" x 11.9" (36.576 x 30.226 cm.)

tapestry: Paris, Mobilier National

Previously thought to be Constantine Investing His Son Crispus with Command of the Fleet, recent research has proved that the identities of those in the panel have been misidentified and that actually the panel represents Emperor Constantius I recognising his son Constantine as his successor.

=== The Marriages of Constantine and Fausta and of Constantia and Licinius ===
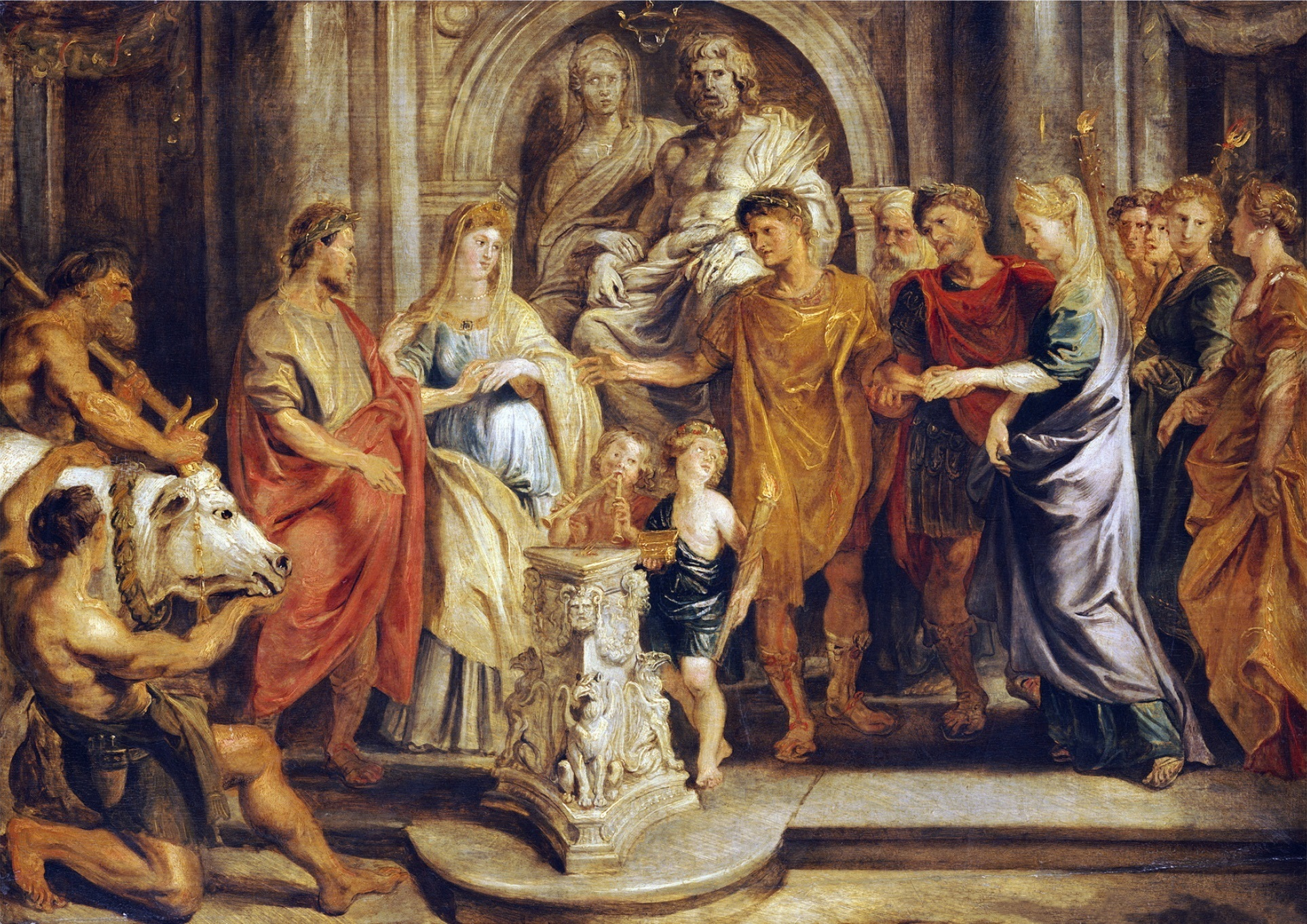
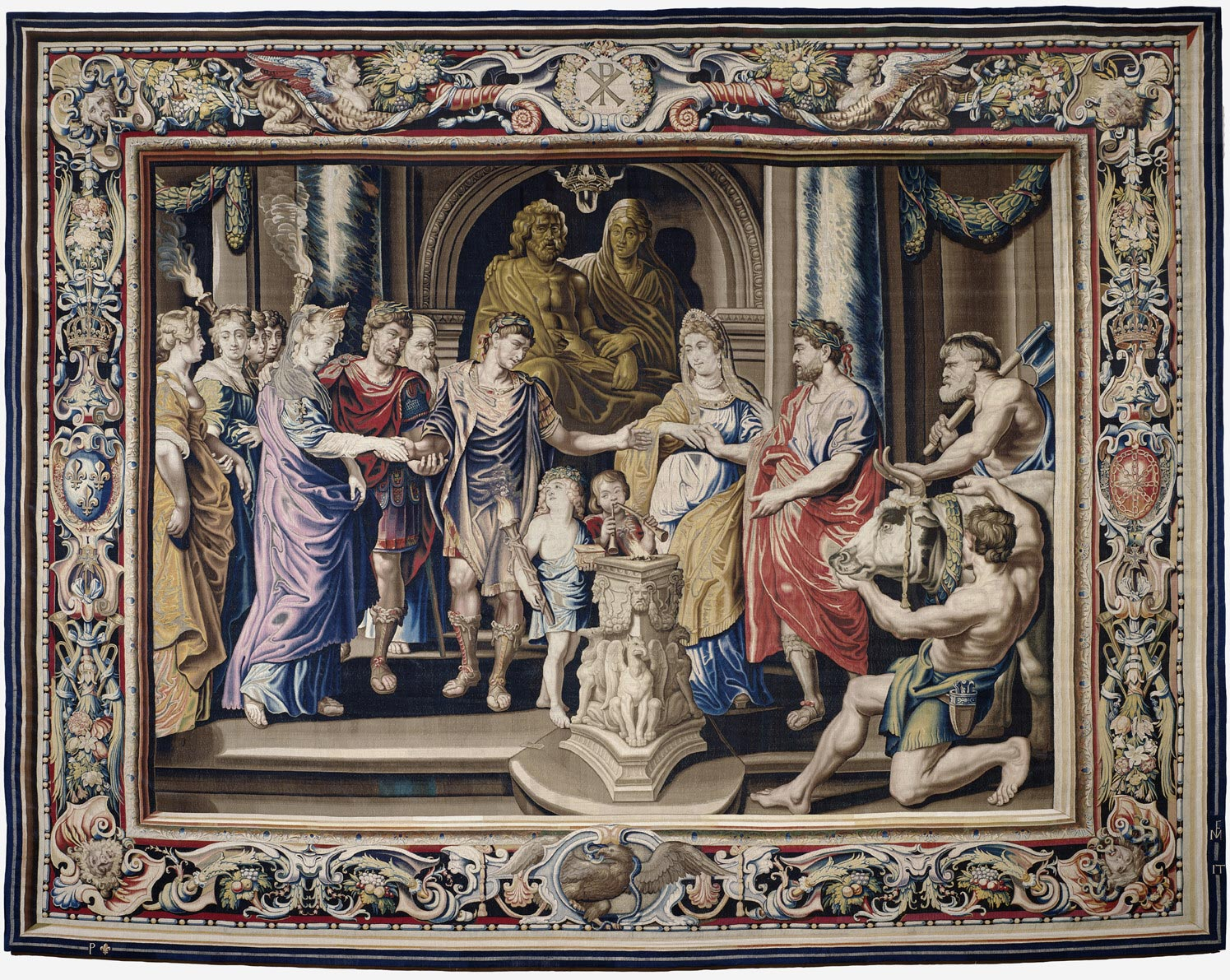

sketch: private collection, 18.625" x 25.375" (47.3 x 64.4 cm.)

tapestry: Philadelphia, Philadelphia Museum of Art 15' 11" x 19' 11.5" (485.14 x 608.33 cm.) (all tapestries unless otherwise noted are held by the PMA)

Although the weddings depicted actually occurred six years apart, most scholars accept the anachronism as an attempt to create a stronger link between Constantine and Louis XIII, whose own marriage to Anne of Austria was a double wedding also featuring the union of his sister to Anne's brother, Philip IV of Spain. The event occurs in a temple of Jupiter and Juno, who preside in the form of statuary. The main difference between the sketch and the tapestry can be seen in the depiction of Jupiter, who wears a stern countenance and brandishes his thunderbolt in the former, quite suitable considering the conflict that would soon arise between the Constantine and Licinius. However, in the final tapestry, Jupiter wears a more beneficent mien and holds his thunderbolt less threatening, as befits the happy union between the royal houses of France and Spain.

=== The Emblem of Christ Appearing to Constantine ===
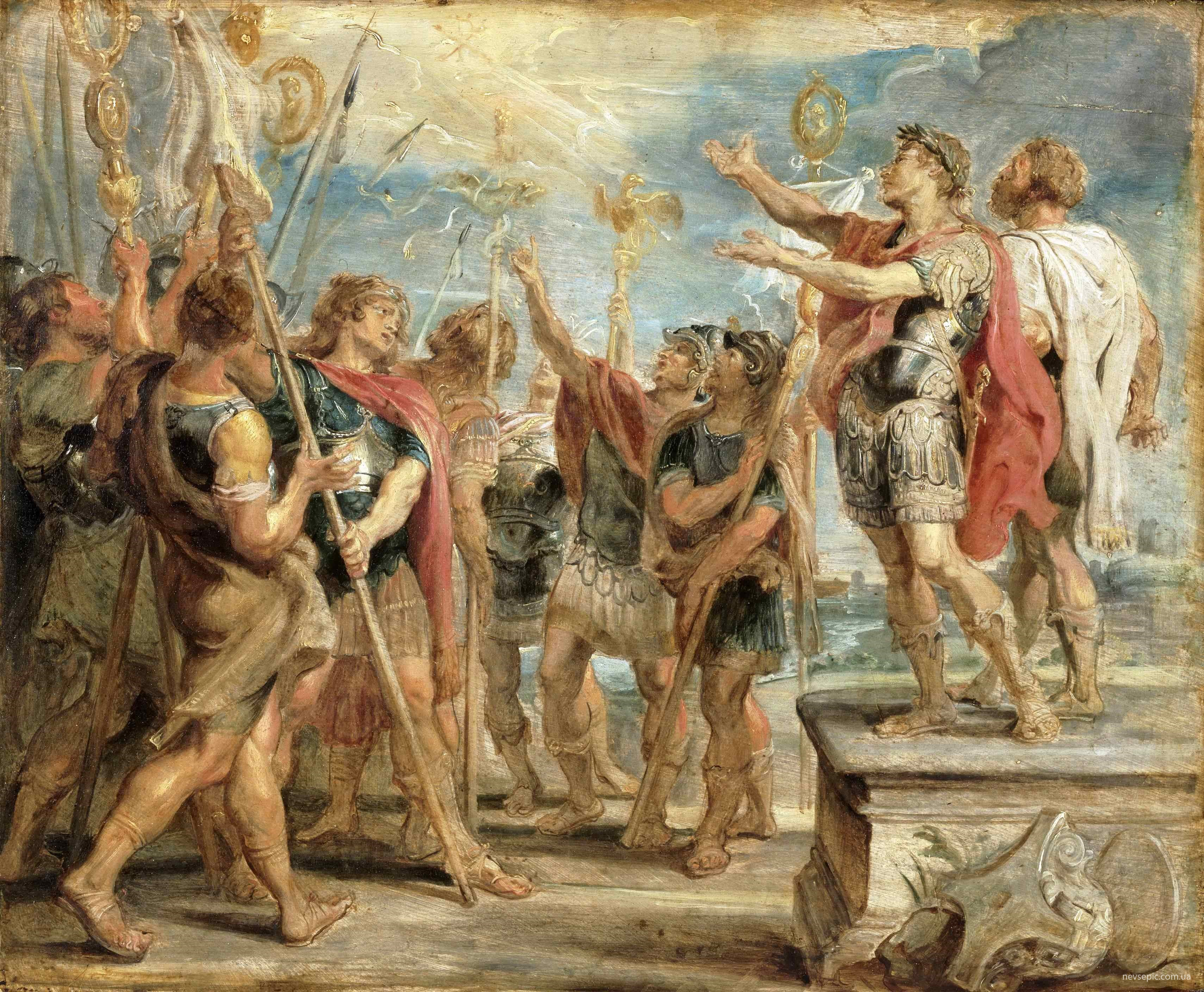

sketch: Philadelphia Museum of Art, 18.186" x 22.063" (46.2 x 56 cm.)

tapestry: Paris, Mobilier National

In this scene, the Chi-Rho monogram of Christ appears before Constantine in the sky at noon just prior to his battle with Maxentius. In a dream, he learns that placing this emblem on his banner assures him of triumph over Maxentius, his co-emperor. Rubens follows Eusebius quite closely, but replaces the flaming cross he described with the monogram in Lactantius' chronicle. One soldier, looking at Constantine rather than the vision, points with the labarum, or military standard, to the next scene.

=== The Labarum ===
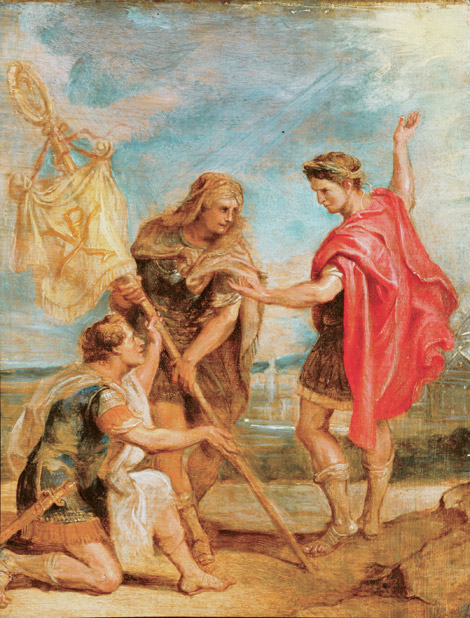

sketch: private collection, 13.9" x 10.8" (35.4 x 27.5 cm.)

tapestry: Paris, Mobilier National

This episode depicts the moments just before the Battle of Milvian Bridge, as Constantine (already crowned with a victor's laurels) presents his labarum. This has been emblazoned with Christ's symbol, as he was instructed. The monogram of Rubens' usual panel maker, Michiel Vrient, is impressed on the back of the panel, along with a branded "A" that indicates the panel was prepared about 1621-22.

=== The Collapse of the Milvian Bridge and the Death of Maxentius ===
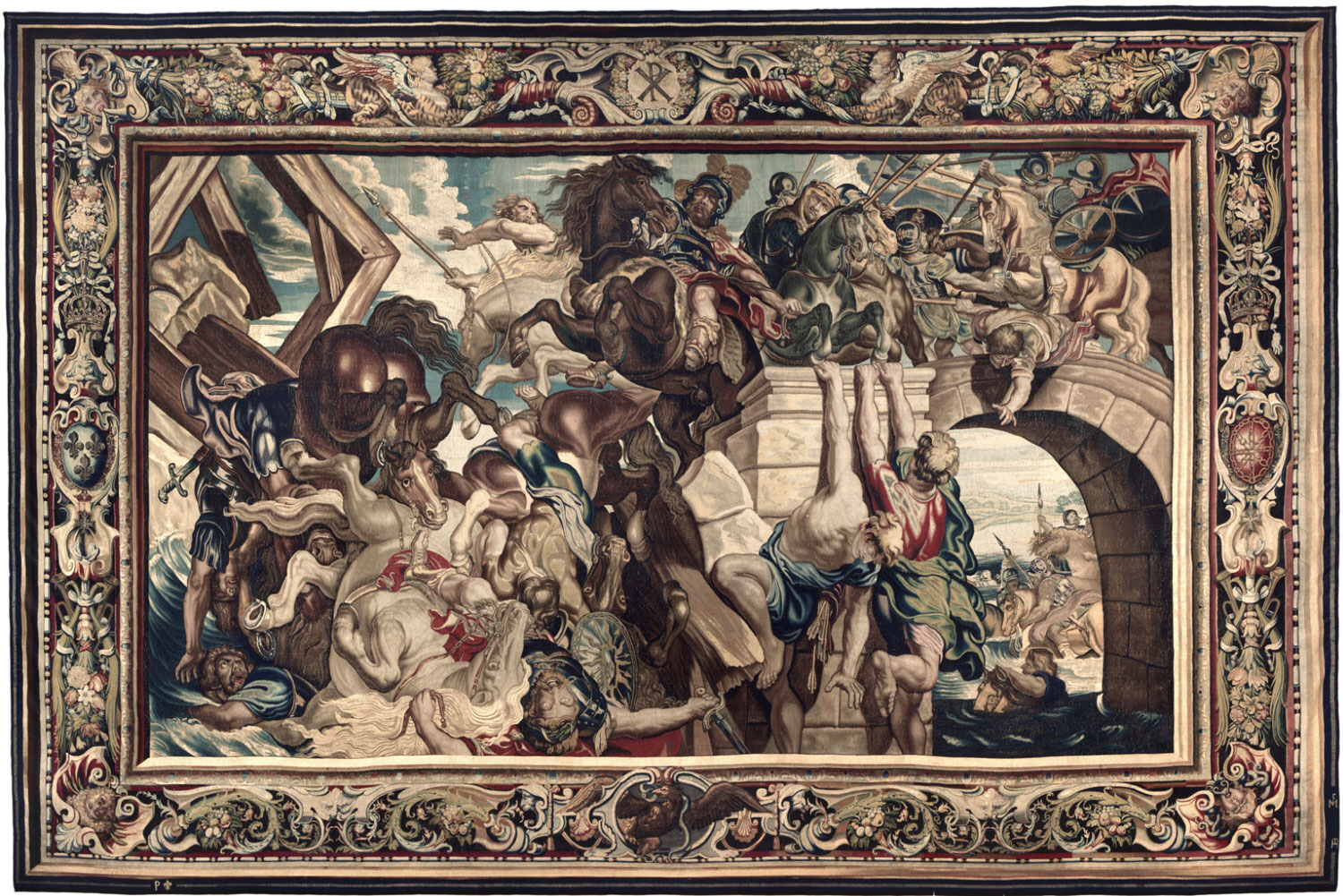

sketch: London, Wallace Collection, 14.5" x 25" (36.83 x 63.5 cm.)

tapestry: 15' 11" x 24' 5" (485.14 x 744.22 cm.)

This tapestry depicts Constantine's defeat of his co-emperor Maxentius in 312 at the Battle of Milvian Bridge. The stone bridge's right arch is interrupted by wooden beams, indicating that Rubens followed Baronio's suggestion that Maxentius tampered with the bridge to trap Constantine. Instead, he was hoist on his own petard when it collapsed early, sending him plummeting into the river, where the weight of his own armor drowned him. Rubens also drew heavily on his own 1615 depiction of the battle of the Greeks and the Amazons, another bridge battle.

=== The Triumphant Entry of Constantine into Rome ===
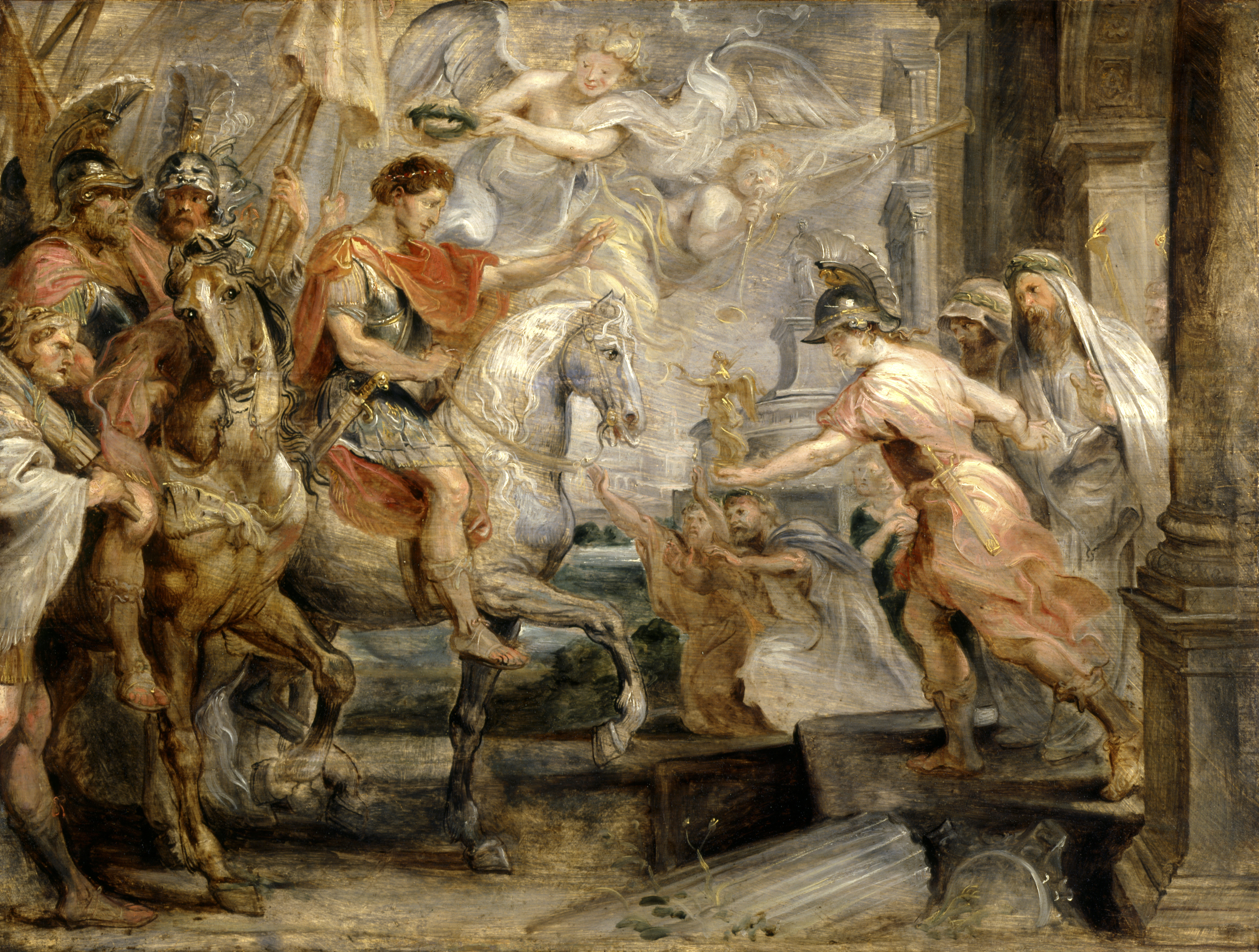
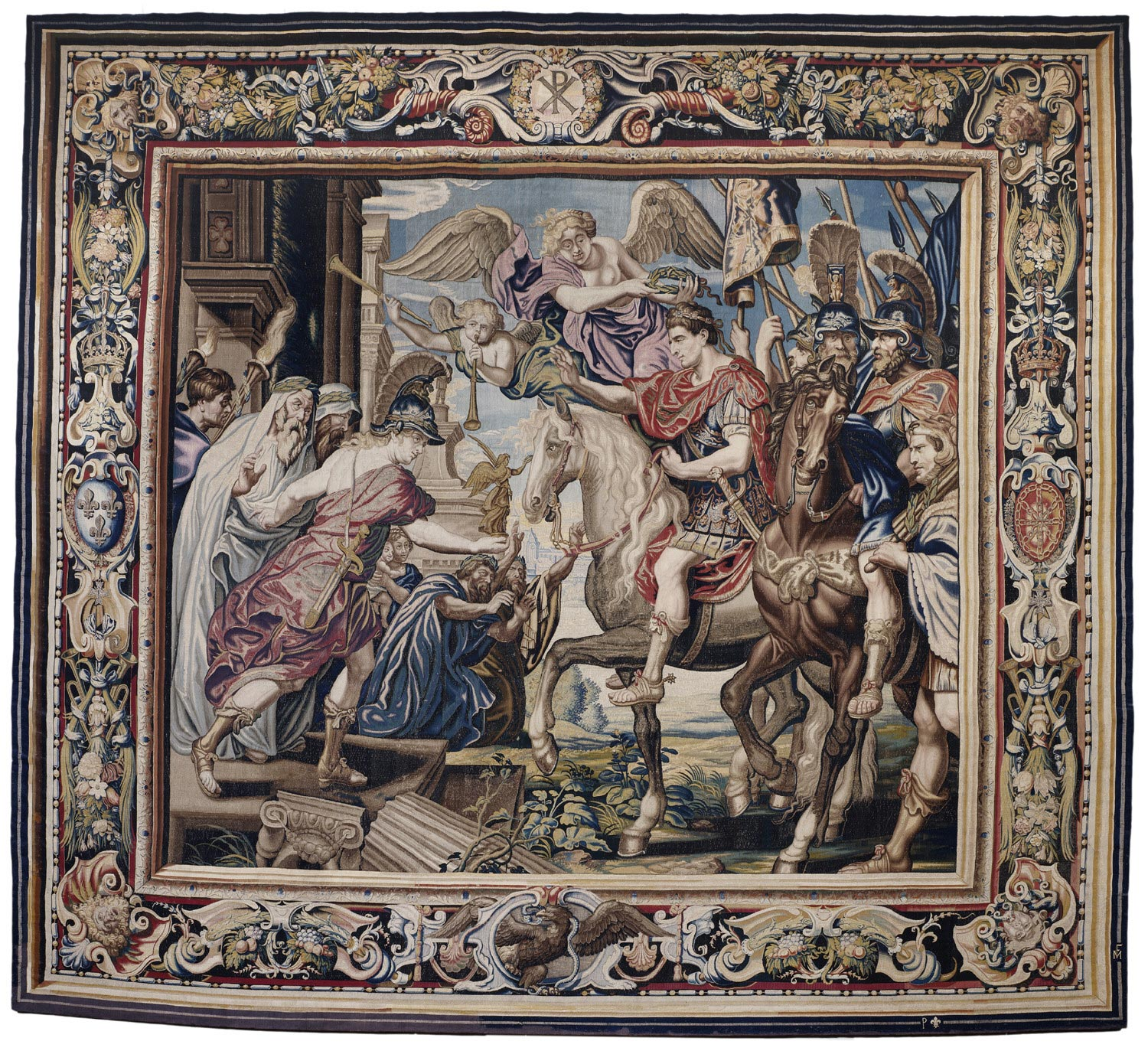

sketch: Indianapolis, Indianapolis Museum of Art, 19" x 25.5" (48.26 x 64.77 cm.)

tapestry: 15' 11.75" x 17' 10.313" (487.054 x 544.355 cm.)

This tapestry depicts Constantine returning to Rome in triumph after defeating his co-emperor, Maxentius. Having called upon the Christian God at Milvian Bridge, Constantine legitimized the Christian religion, offering it new status and protection. Accordingly, the Greek symbol for Christ can be seen on the imperial banner, and pagan priests are pushed aside by a personification of Roma honoring Constantine. Rubens used the Arch of Constantine as inspiration, mimicking the form and presentation of its triumphal procession relief. The semi-derelict state of the architecture may refer to the imminent rebirth of the battered city. Constantine's legitimacy is relentlessly pounded home by the heralding of Fame and Victory, as well as the presence of a lictor bearing the fasces that symbolize his authority. In transforming the work from sketch to tapestry, the composition was horizontally compressed, decreasing the gap between Constantine and Roma and so diminishing the sense of movement. Additional architectural detail and foliage were added.

=== The Trophy ===
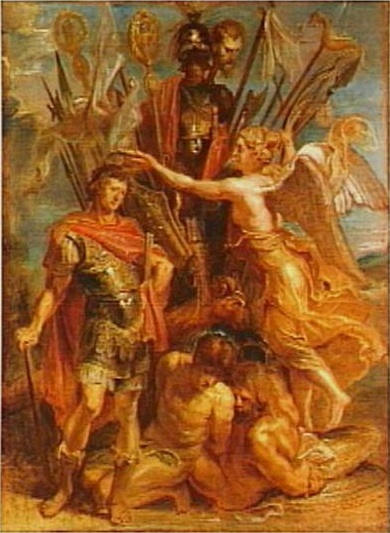

sketch: private collection, 15" x 11.5" (38.1 x 29.21 cm.)

tapestry: Paris, Mobilier National

Again following Eusebius, Rubens depicts Constantine setting up a trophy of victory in Rome after his defeat of Maxentius. A winged Victory crowns him in front of a collection of implements of war. A bearded head on a pole likely is Maxentius himself, whose head was cut off and carried back to Rome on a spear according to Baronio.

=== The Baptism of Constantine ===
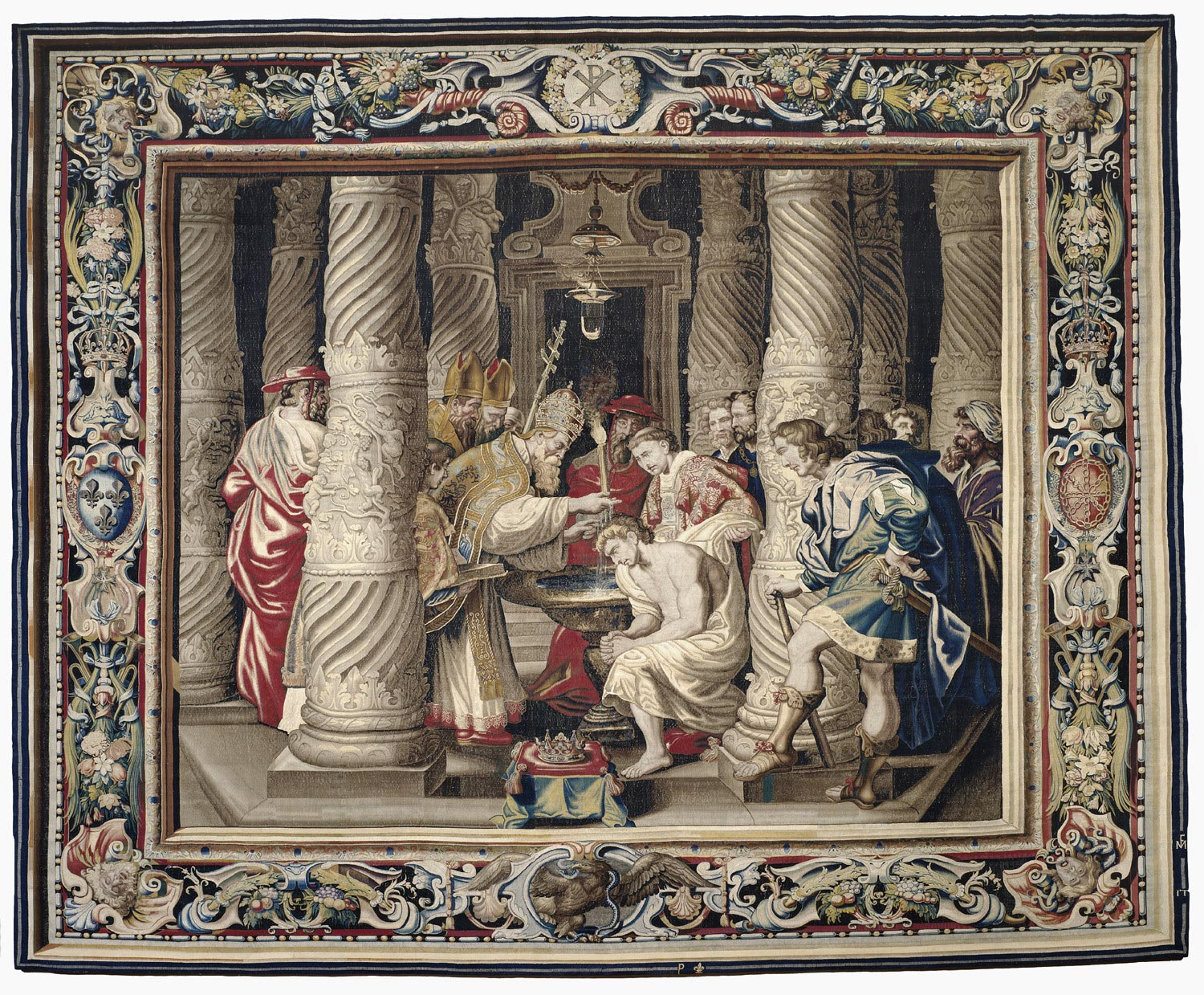

sketch: private collection, 17.75" x 22.813" (45.085 x 57.945 cm.)

tapestry: 15' 8" x 17' 10.75" (477.52 x 545.465 cm.)

In order to maintain a safe distance from the Arian Heresy condemned by the Council of Nicaea, Rubens ignored Eusebius' account for once and instead used the much later Vita Silvestri, a medieval collection of legends. Thus, Constantine is here safely baptized by Pope Sylvester in Rome, rather than Nicomedia as actually occurred. The main difference between sketch and tapestry is the fact that the later includes Constantine's crown on a nearby cushion, a reference to a legend that a spontaneous flame appeared over the baptismal font and would not be extinguished until Constantine removed his crown.

=== Constantine Defeating Licinius ===
sketch: Kansas City, Nelson-Atkins Museum of Art, 14.625" x 22.625" (37.15 x 57.47 cm.)

tapestry: Paris, Mobilier National

Constantine's brother-in-law and co-ruler Licinius was defeated not once but twice by Constantine for continuing to persecute Christians. This tapestry depicts the first battle, fought on land and led by Constantine himself, in a laurel wreath.

=== Constantine Worshiping the True Cross ===
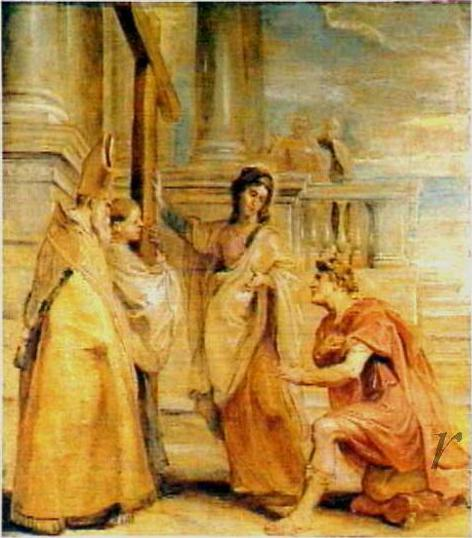
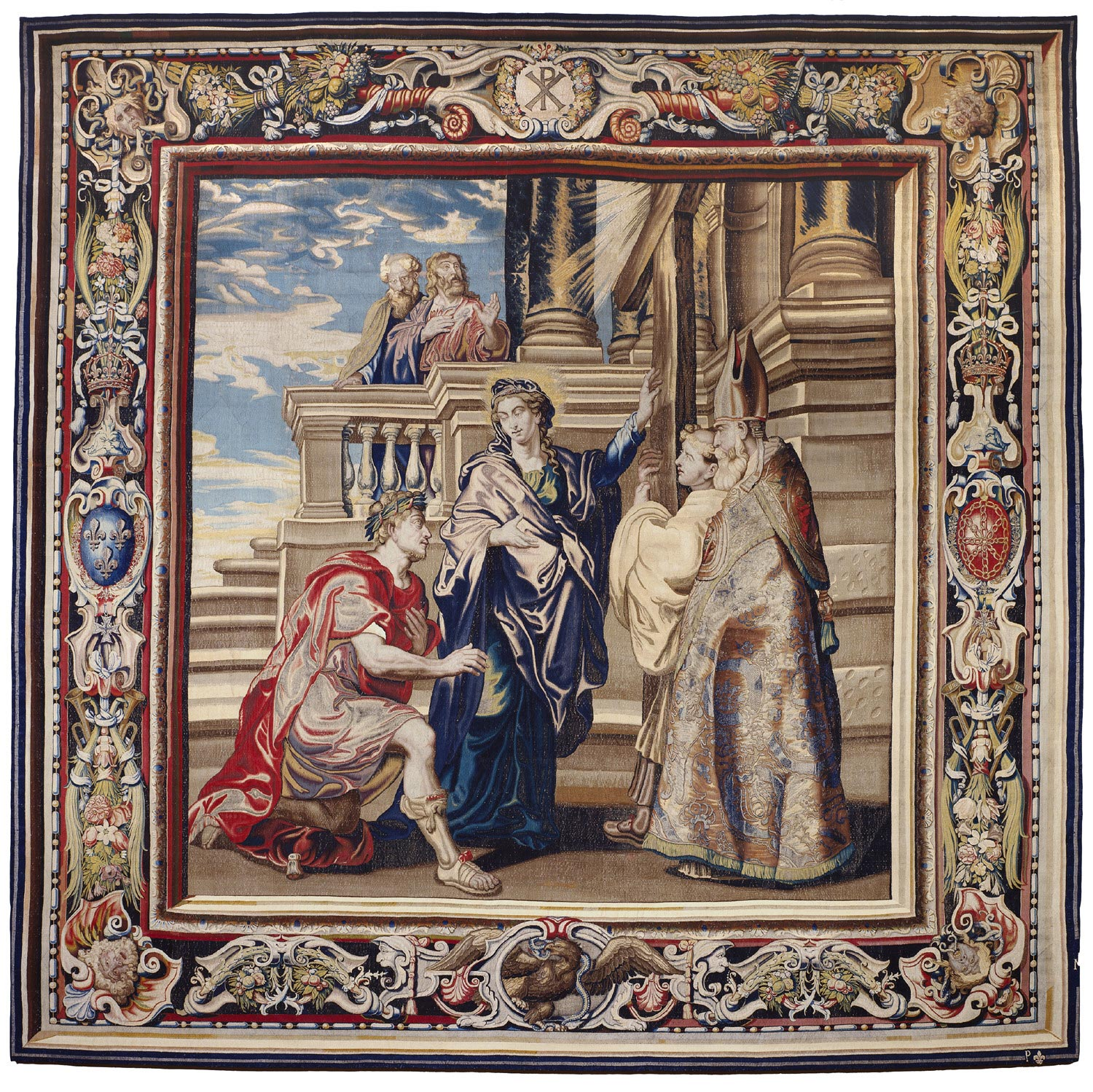

sketch: private collection, 13.9" x 13.3" (35.306 x 33.782 cm.)

tapestry: 16' 3" x 16' 6" (495.3 x 502.92 cm.)

According to legend, Constantine's mother St. Helena discovered the true cross in Jerusalem and was rejuvenated, explaining her youthful appearance in Rubens' depiction. The tapestry differs from the sketch in the enlargement of the background architecture, apparently to give greater emphasis to the environment of the scene.

=== The Founding of Constantinople ===
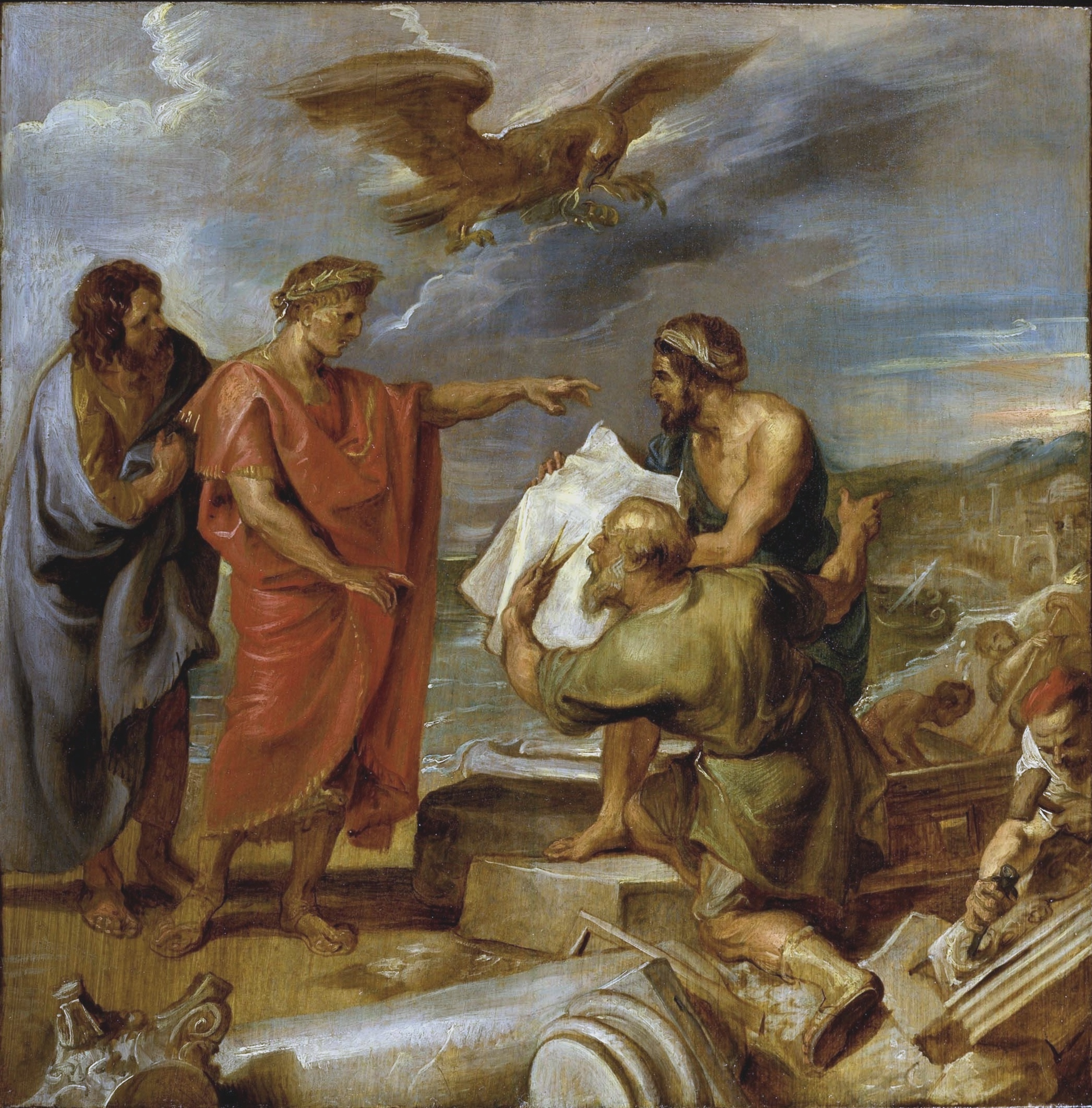
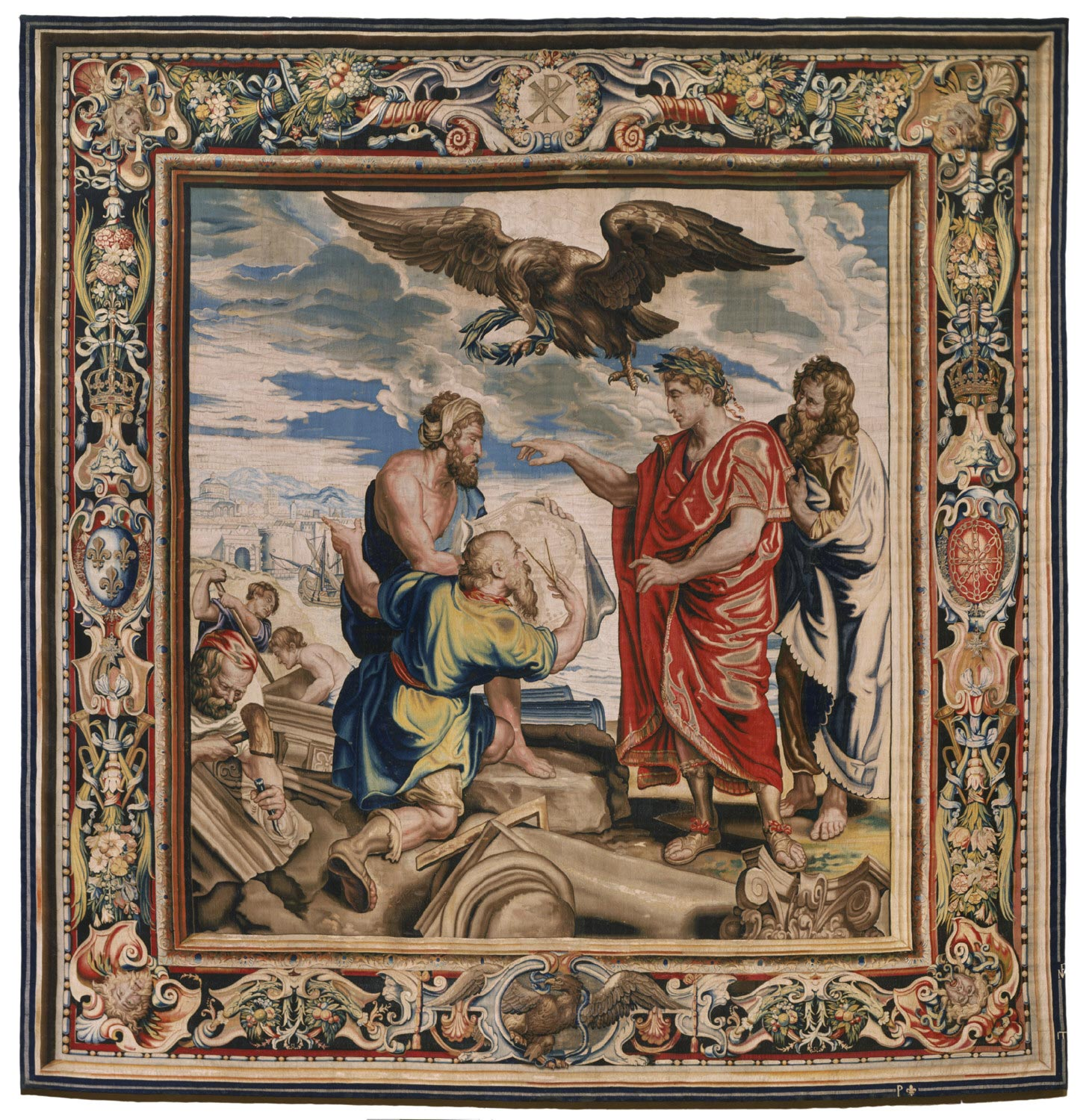

sketch: private collection, 6.3" x 16" (16.002 x 40.64 cm.)

tapestry: 15' 10.5" x 15' 9" (483.87 x 480.06 cm.)

The building of Constantinople occurred 324-330. The eagle flying overhead with a branch of broom depicts the legend of how the emperor chose the site for his city. It was taken as a good omen since broom was used to mark the enclosure of the city. In the sketch, the workman's displayed paper is blank, but the tapestry sketches in the ground plan of the Pantheon.

=== The Death of Constantine ===
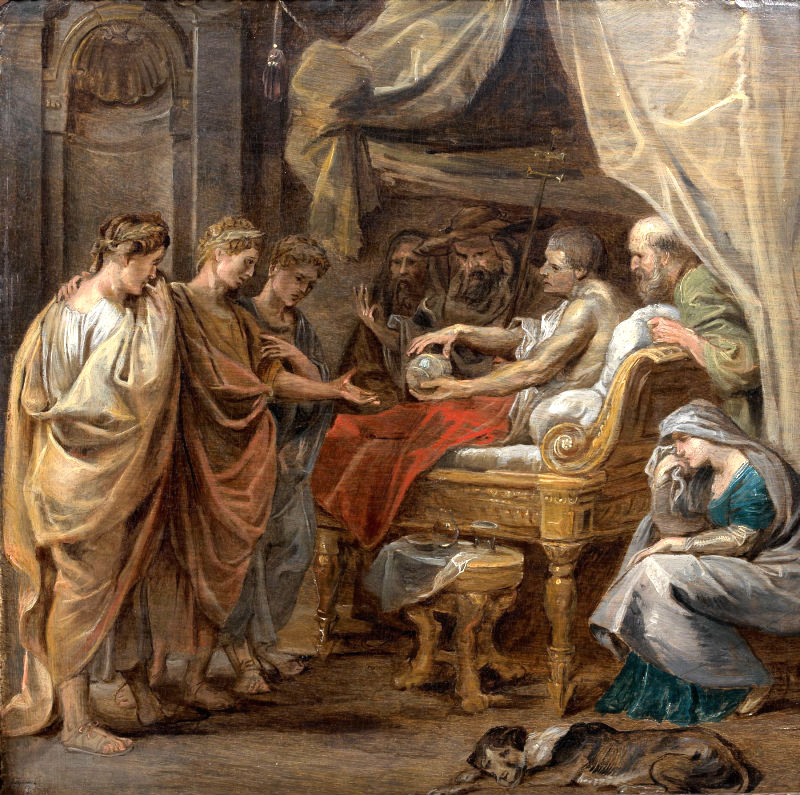
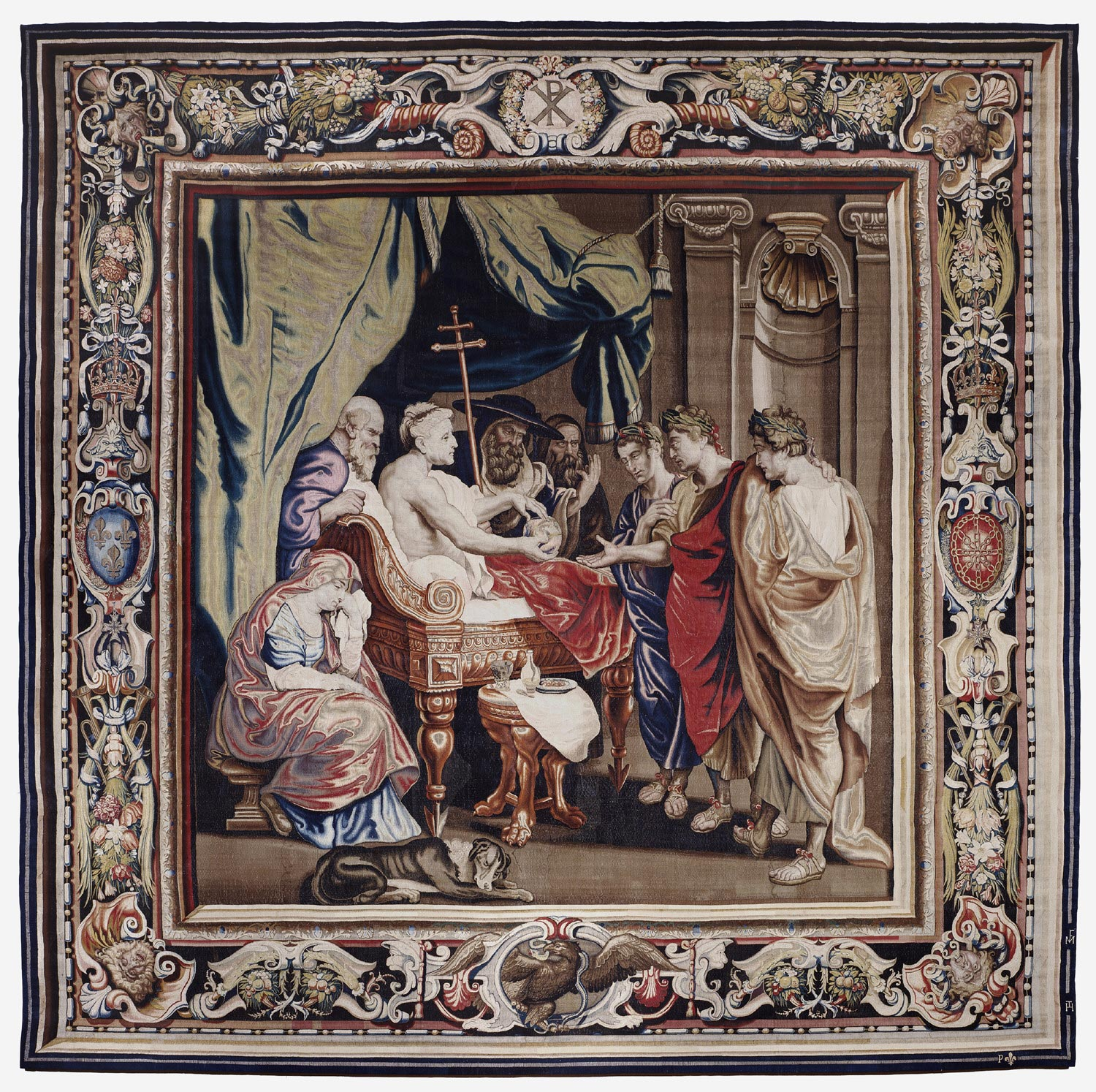

sketch: private collection, 13.4" x 13.2" (34.036 x 33.528 cm.)

tapestry: 16' .5" x 16' 4" (488.95 x 497.84 cm.)

Constantine's death in 337 at Nicomedia, was not in fact attended by any of his three surviving sons Constantius II, Constantine II, or Constans as depicted here. All three did inherit parts of the Roman Empire, represented here by the orb of sovereignty being handed over by Constantine.

=== The Triumph of Rome ===
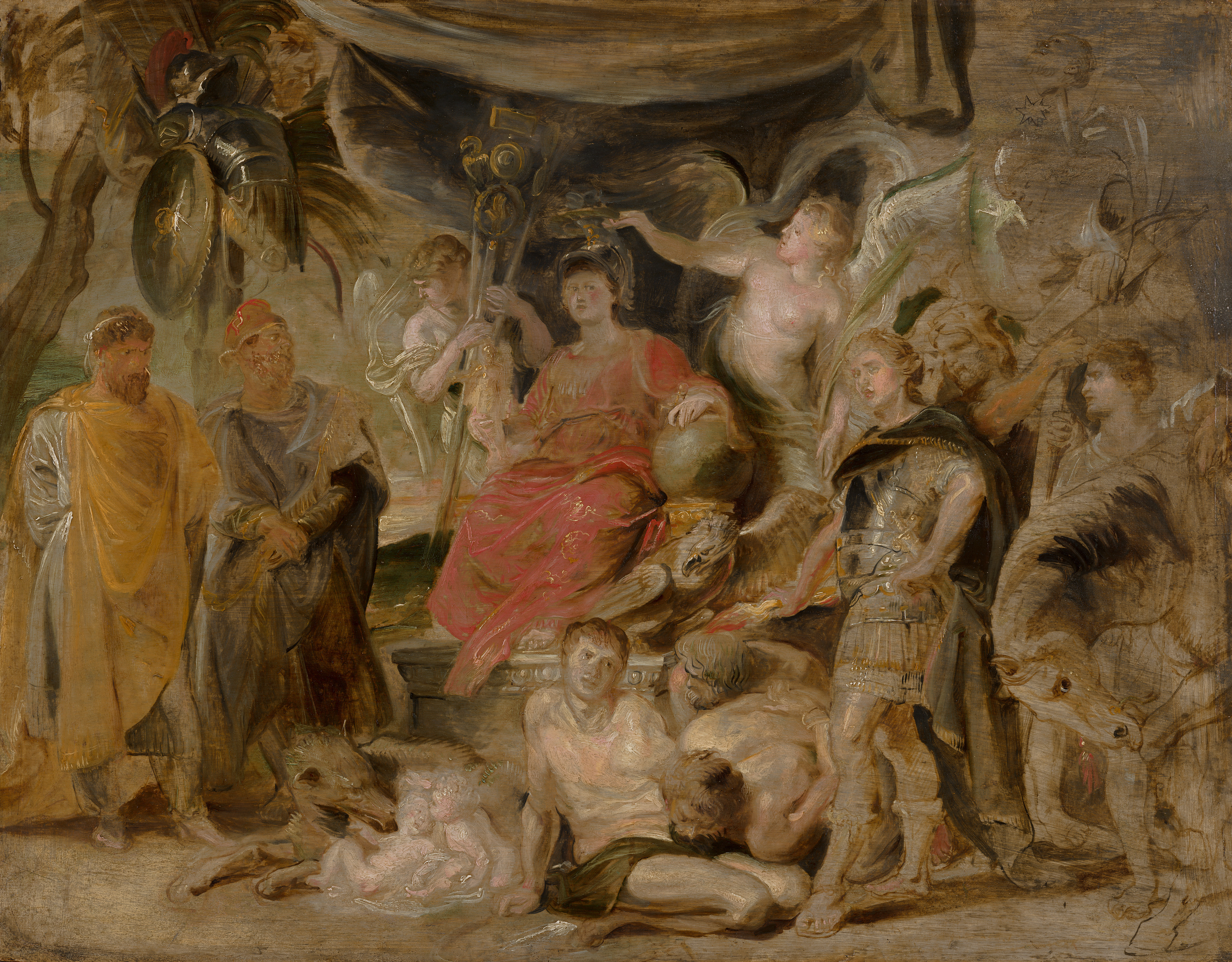

sketch: The Hague, Mauritshuis, 21.3" x 27.2" (54 x 69 cm.)

This thirteenth sketch was completed by Rubens, but replaced by The Death of Constantine when the tapestries were manufactured, having been deemed unsuitable. It is full of allegorical figures, like liberated Rome, two winged Victories, and Romulus and Remus, which is likely why it was rejected in a series focusing on real, historical elements of Constantine's life.

== Cortona's designs ==
Unlike Rubens, Cortona crafted both the initial sketch and the enlarged cartoon from which the tapestries were actually woven. The surviving cartoons are now held in the Palazzo Corsini in Florence.

=== Apparition of the Monogram of Christ ===
tapestry: 16' 2" x 11' 5" (492.67 x 347.98 cm.)

This is the sole repeated incident between the two artists. When depicting the same event as Rubens, Cortona opted to display the fiery cross described by Eusebius instead of the Chi-Rho monogram.

=== Constantine Fighting the Lion ===
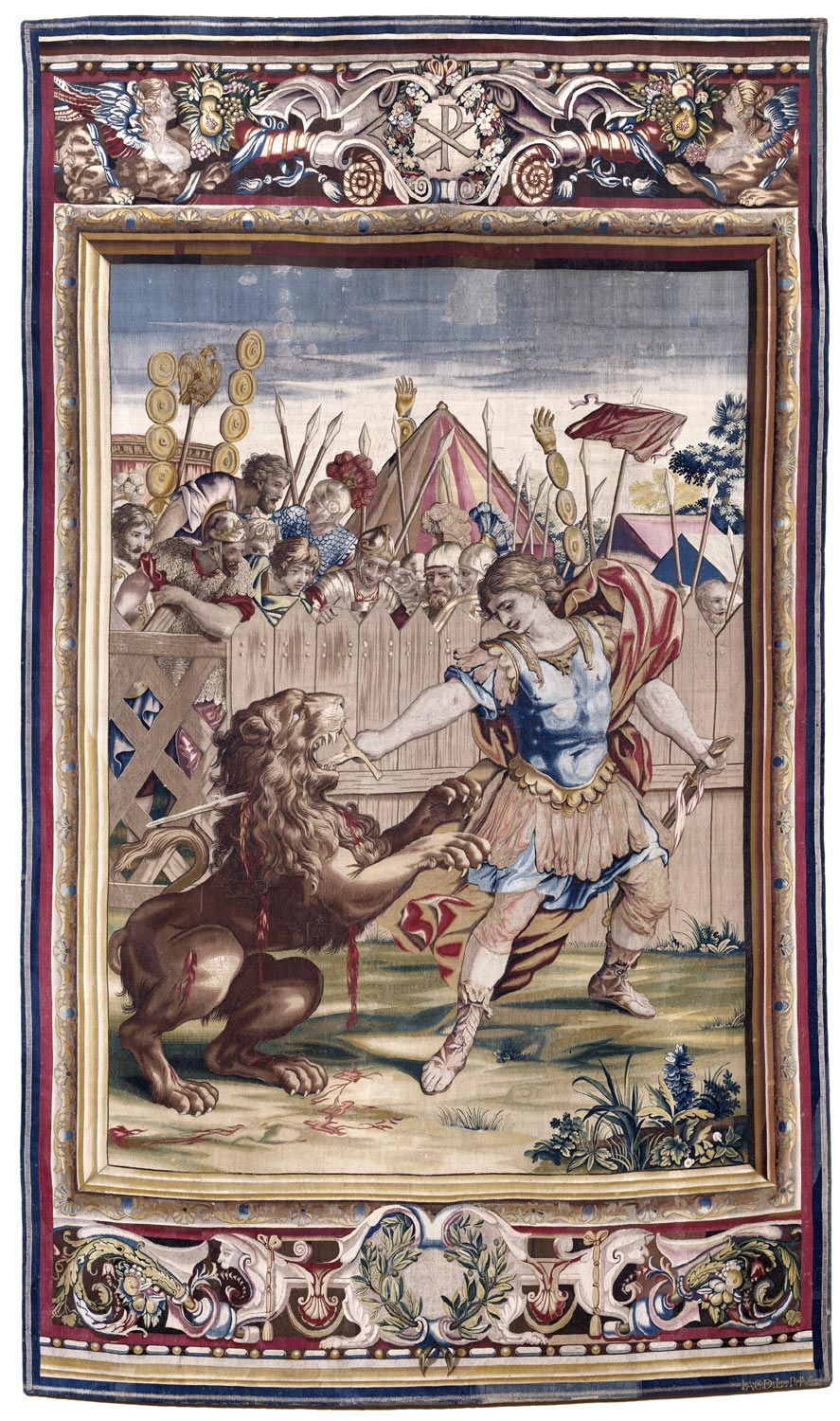

cartoon: 10' 6.375" x 8' 5.5" (320.993 x 257.81 cm.)

tapestry: 16' 5" x 9' 9" (500.38 x 297.18 cm.)

This image of a young Constantine thrusting his sword through a lion's mouth while onlookers admire is based on a legend illustrating his bravery even when a mere boy.

=== Constantine Burning the Memorials ===
cartoon: 10' 9.5" x 10' 4.375" (328.93 x 315.913 cm.)

tapestry: 16' 3" x 15' (495.3 x 457.2 cm.)

This tapestry illustrates the tax concessions instituted by Constantine in favor of the Christian church.

=== Constantine Destroying the Idols ===
cartoon: 10' 5.5" x 7' 5.313" (318.77 x 226.855 cm.)

tapestry: 16' 6" x 12' 4" (505.968 x 375.92 cm.)

During the increased efforts to quash paganism following 323, laws prohibited sacrifices to their gods and ordered their temples destroyed. Here, the violent smashing of pagan statuary is immediately followed by the placement of a statue of Jesus on the vacated pedestal.

=== Campaign Against Licinius, Sea Battle ===
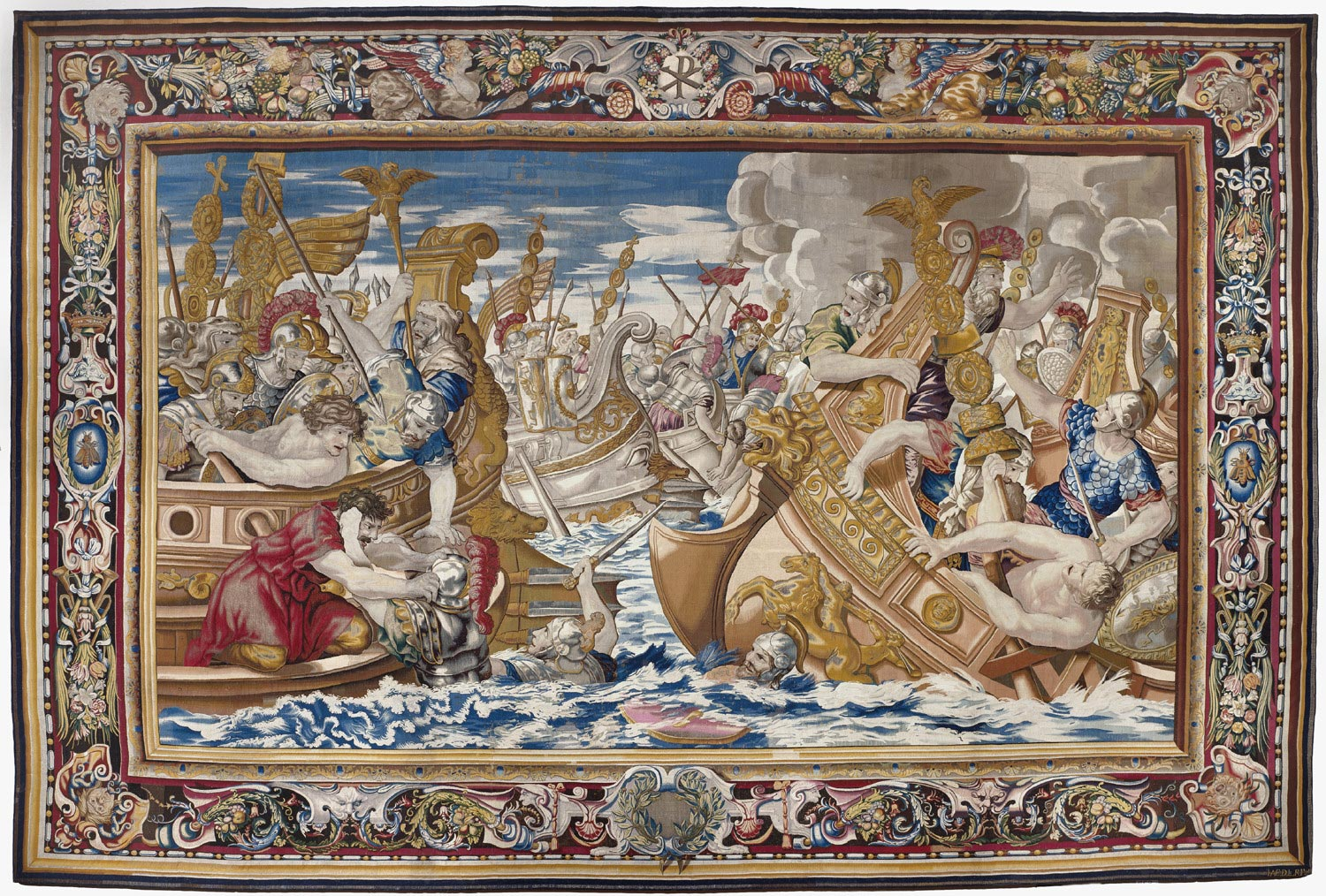

cartoon: 10' 7.5" x 19' 7.25" (323.85 x 597.535 cm.)

tapestry: 16' 8" x 23' 4" (508 x 711.2 cm.)

This tapestry complements Rubens' by depicting the second half of the campaign against Licinius. In this second confrontation, Crispus' victory at sea cemented his father as the supreme ruler in both east and west.

== See also ==
- Marie de' Medici cycle
