= Jean-Baptiste Oudry =

18th-century French Rococo painter

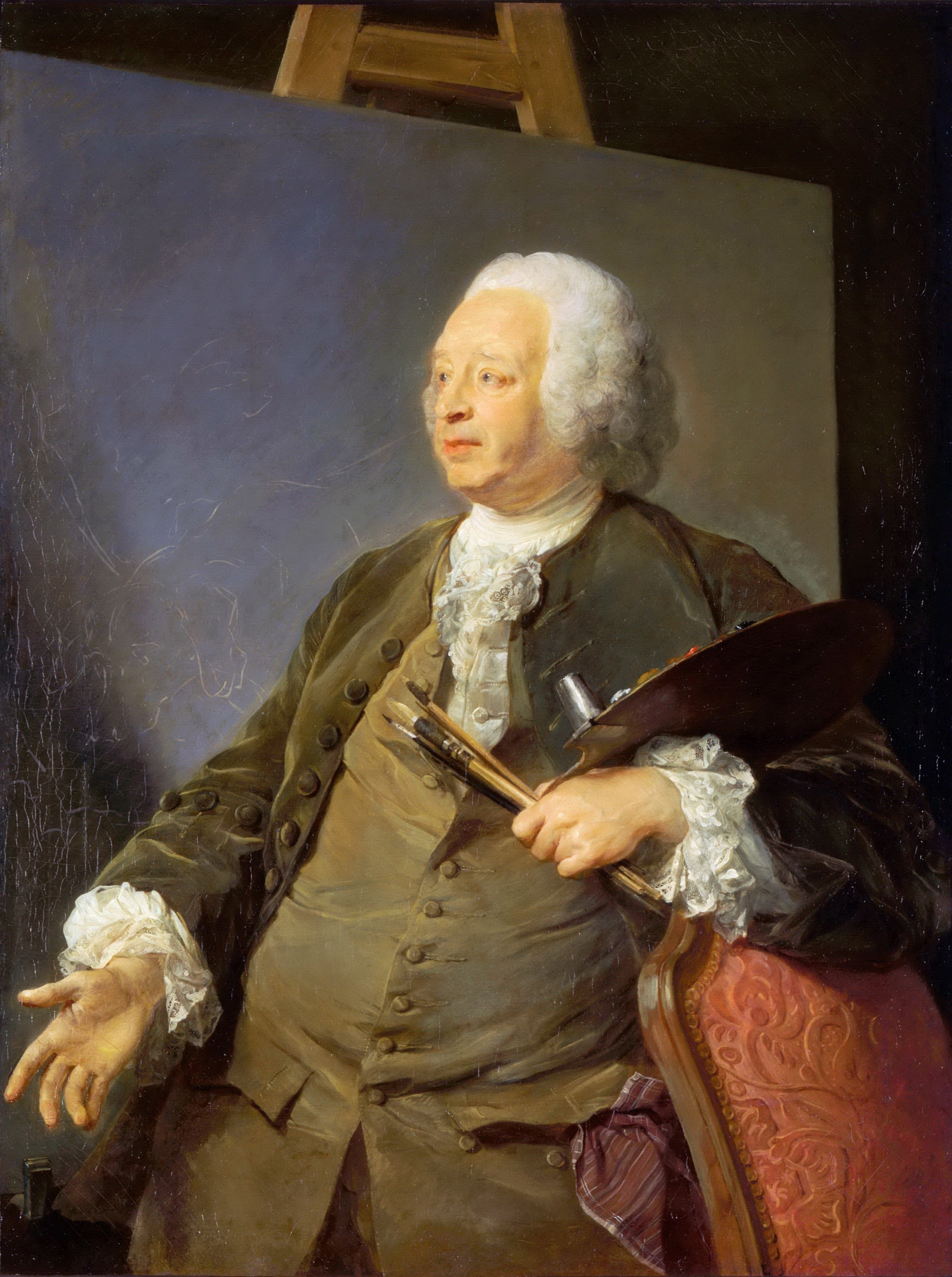
Jean-Baptiste Oudry, by Jean-Baptiste Perronneau.

Jean-Baptiste Oudry (French pronunciation: [ʒɑ̃ batist udʁi]; 17 March 1686 – 30 April 1755) was a French Rococo painter, engraver, and tapestry designer. He is particularly well known for his naturalistic pictures of animals and his hunt pieces depicting game. His son, Jacques-Charles Oudry, was also a painter.

== Biography ==
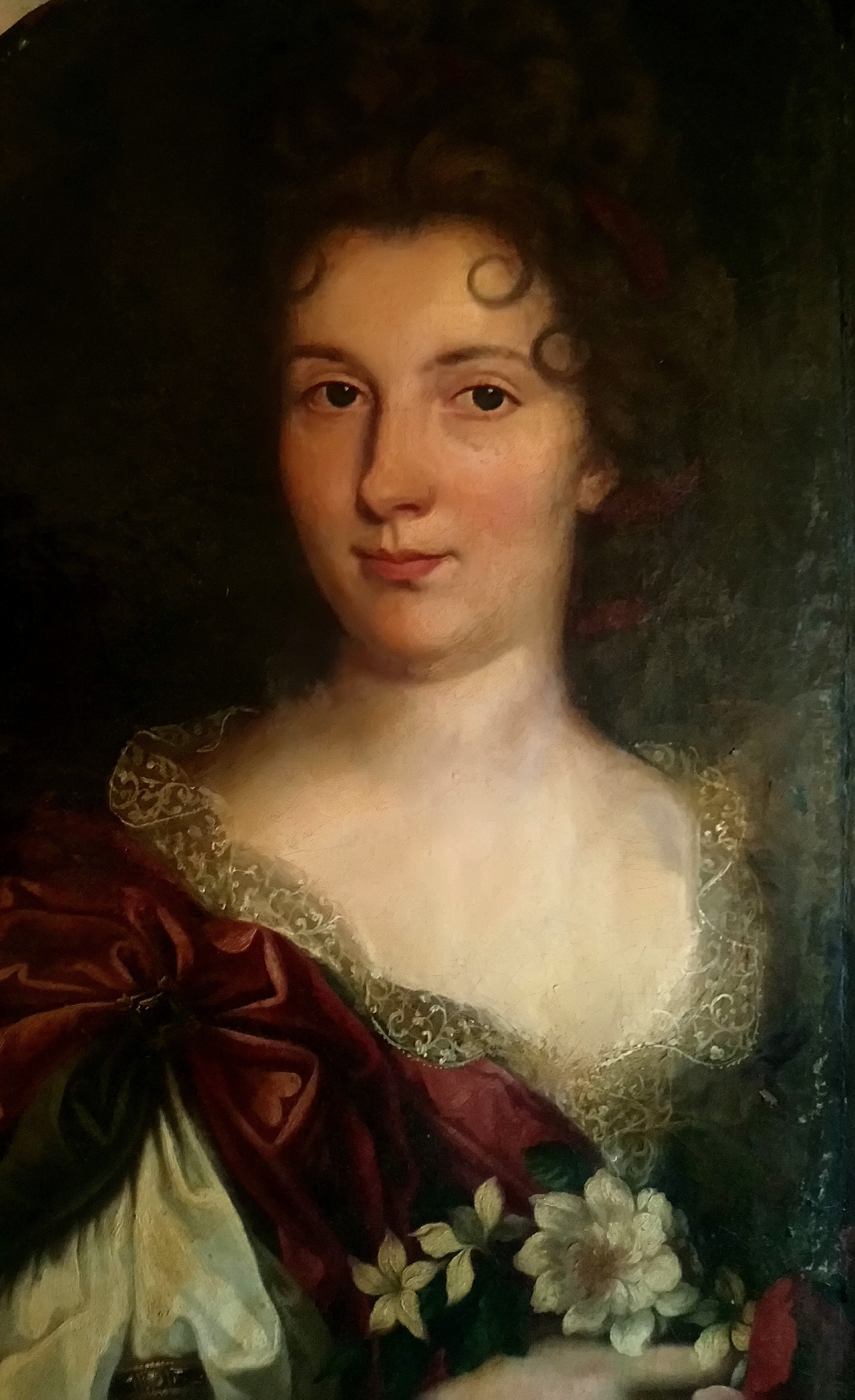
Marie–Marguerite Oudry, the artist's wife

Jean-Baptiste Oudry was born in Paris, the son of Jacques Oudry, a painter and art dealer, and his wife Nicole Papillon, relative of the engraver Jean-Baptiste-Michel Papillon.

His father was a director of the Académie de Saint-Luc art school, which Oudry joined. At first, Oudry concentrated on portraiture, and he became a pupil and perhaps a collaborator of Nicolas de Largillière from 1707 to 1712. He graduated at only 22 years of age, on 21 May 1708, at the same time as his two older brothers. The next year, he married Marie–Marguerite Froissé, the daughter of a miroitier (a mirror-maker) to whom he gave lessons in painting.

Oudry became an assistant professor at Académie de Saint-Luc in 1714, and professor on 1 July 1717. He was inducted as a member of the prestigious Académie royale de peinture et de sculpture in 1719, and was engaged as a professor there in 1743. After producing mainly portraits, Oudry started to produce still life paintings of fruits or animals, as well as paintings of religious subjects, such as the Nativity, Saint Giles, and the Adoration of the Magi.

In the 1720s Oudry was commissioned by Noël-Antoine de Mérou, director of the Royal Beauvais Tapestry Manufactory to create the designs for what has come to be one of the most iconic series of tapestries of the period. The series was called The Pastoral Amusements, or Les Amusements Champêtres.

Through his friend, Jean-Baptiste Massé, a portrait-painter and miniaturist, Oudry was introduced to the Marquis de Beringhen, hereditary master of the royal stables, for whom he painted a pair of paintings in 1727, followed by a suite of landscapes in the Flemish manner. Through this connection, he was commissioned to produce the painting that made his reputation, Louis XV hunting a deer in the Forest of Saint-Germain (1730; now at Toulouse). Subsequently, he was commissioned to produce numerous works for the King, who was passionate about the hunt and appointed Oudry Painter-in-Ordinary of the Royal Hunt, in which capacity he produced portraits of dead game, the day's kill. Oudry was granted a workshop in the Tuileries and an apartment in the Louvre.

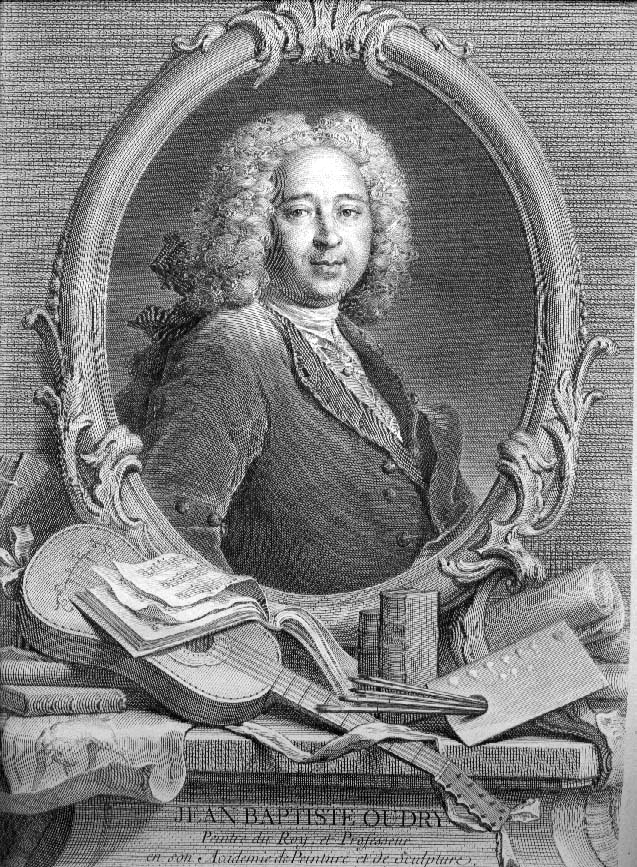
Jean-Baptiste Oudry, by his wife Marie–Marguerite Froissé, etching after a Nicolas de Largillière painting

M. Hultz, an adviser to the Académie de Peinture, commissioned Oudry to produce a buffet, or still-life combining silver plates and ewers, fruit and game; the work was exhibited in the Salon of 1737. Oudry timidly asked for ten pistoles for his work, but Hultz valued it much higher, insisting on paying twenty-five. Oudry was also commissioned to produce a buffet for Louis XV (exhibited in the Salon of 1743), that went to the château de Choisy, the King's favoured hunting residence.

Hultz recommended Oudry to Louis Fagon (1680–1744), an intendant des finances and book collector, and Oudry decorated his houses in Vanves and Fontenay-aux-Roses with arabesques, flowers and birds. Fagon was charged with reviving the fortunes of the tapestry manufactory of Beauvais, which had flourished under Colbert, and he gave the task to Oudry and his associate, Besnier, in 1734. Oudry succeeded in his tasks, becoming wealthy in the process. His success at Beauvais led to a further appointment as inspector at the Gobelins manufactory in 1736, where his works were copied as cartoons for tapestries. Through most of the 1730s, he concentrated mainly on producing designs for tapestries, notably the nine Chasses Royales Gobelins series (1733–46), first woven for the Château de Compiègne (and reunited in Compiègne), for which the cartoons were later framed into the boiseries in an interior decor for Charles X at Fontainebleau, 1828.

Oudry used a camera obscura in an attempt to speed up the process of producing landscapes, but abandoned it when he saw that the perspective and the effects of light and shade did not appear correct.

Although Oudry produced excellent scenes of animals and of hunting, he also painted portraits, histories, landscapes, fruits and flowers; he imitated bas reliefs in monotone tints en camaïeu, drew on blue paper, used pastels, and created etchings. He was often sent examples of rare birds to draw.

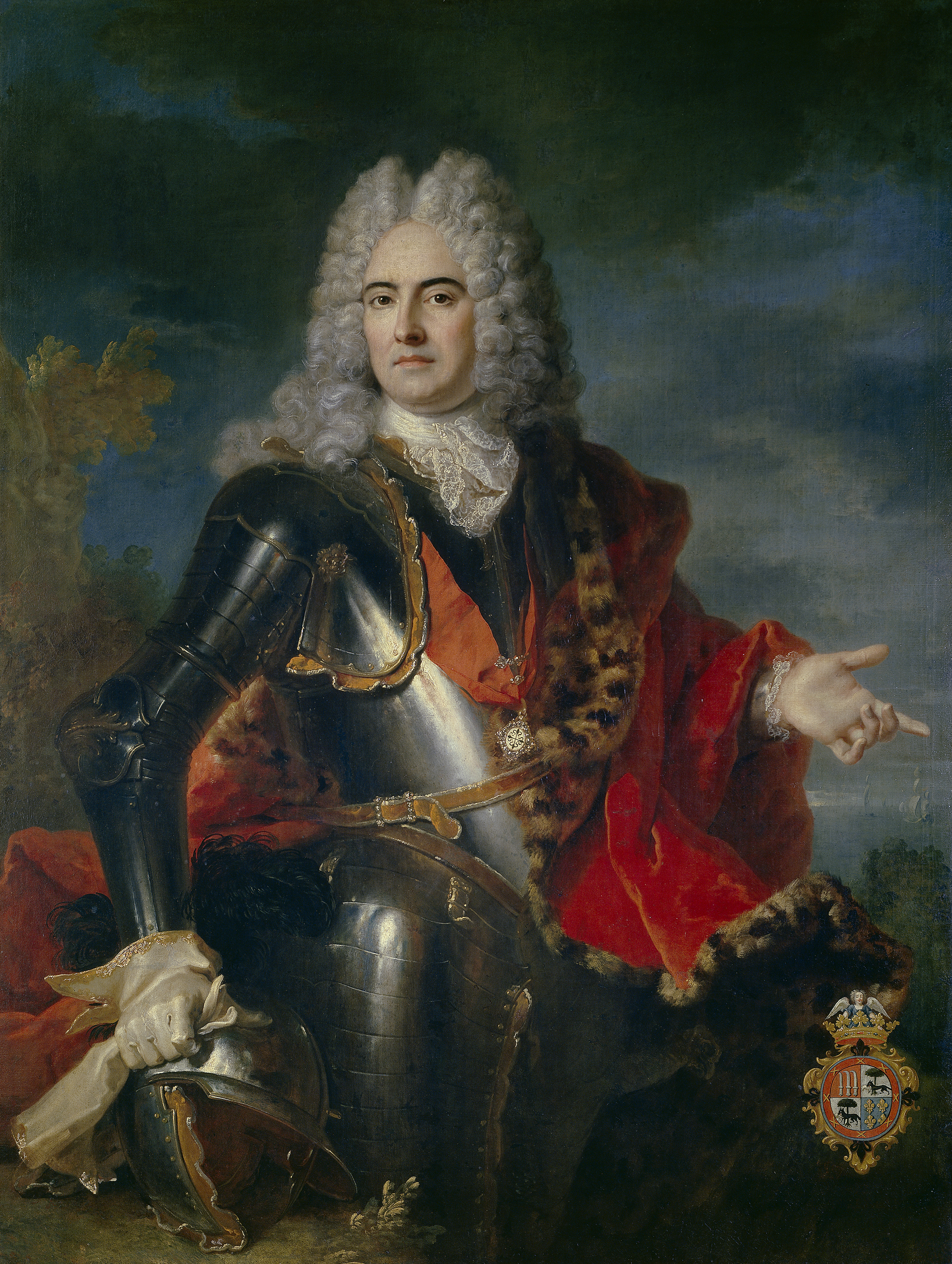
José de Rozas y Meléndez de la Cueva, 1st Count of Castelblanco (ca. 1716), Prado Museum, Madrid.

An important patron was Christian Ludwig II, Duke of Mecklenburg-Schwerin, who commissioned two pairs of paintings from Oudry: Three Does Watching Two Stags Fighting and A Family of Roe Deer; and A Boar Hunt and A Wolf Hunt, both delivered in 1734. He later purchased a series of large paintings of animals from Louis XV's menagerie at Versailles. Oudry's initial motive for painting these works is obscure. When exhibited at the Paris Salon, they had been described as having been painted for the French king; however the commission seems to come through the king's surgeon, François Gigot de la Peyronie, who had engravings made after them, and in a letter to Christian dated March 1750, Oudry wrote that they had become available for sale due to de La Peyronie's death. In addition to the portraits of the animals from the royal menagerie, Christian also bought Oudry's life-size painting of "Clara", an Indian rhinoceros which had been exhibited all around Europe to great public interest. The works are still at Schwerin.

He turned down offers to work for the Czar Peter the Great and the King of Denmark, preferring to remain in France, where he maintained a large studio of assistants.

Oudry lost some of his responsibilities when Fagon was replaced by de Trudaine. He suffered two strokes in quick succession. The second left him paralysed and he died shortly thereafter in Beauvais (in present-day Oise). He was buried in the Church of Saint-Thomas in Beauvais. His epitaph on the stone was lost when the church was demolished in 1795, but was later found and placed in the Church of Saint-Étienne.

Two exhibitions curated by Hal N. Opperman, first at the Grand Palais, Paris, October 1982 – January 1983, and then in a travelling exhibition in the United States, 1983, encouraged a reassessment of this purely French portraitist and genre painter.

== Gallery ==
=== Oil paintings ===
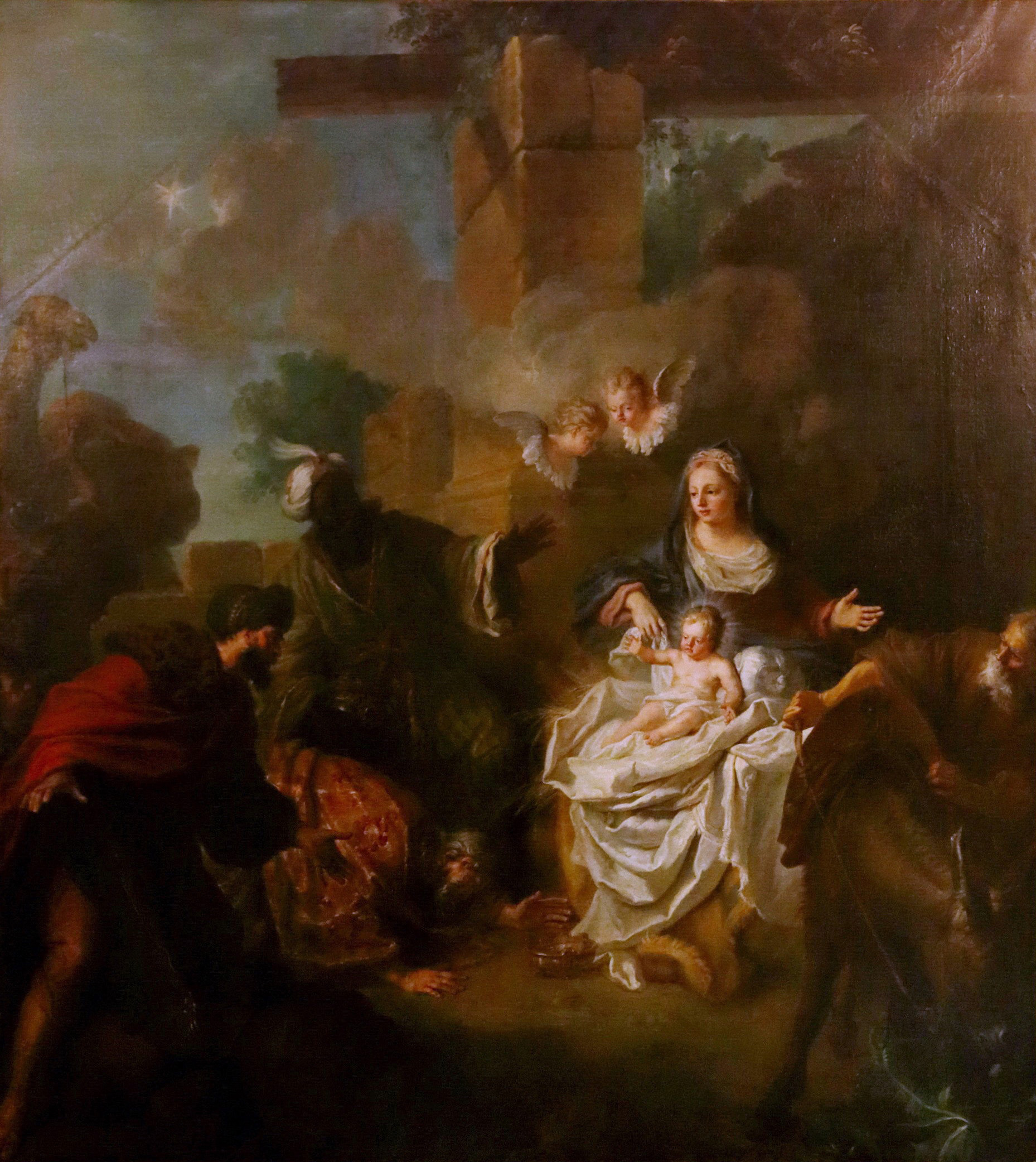
Adoration of the Magi (1717), 290 x 260 cm., Église Saint-Georges

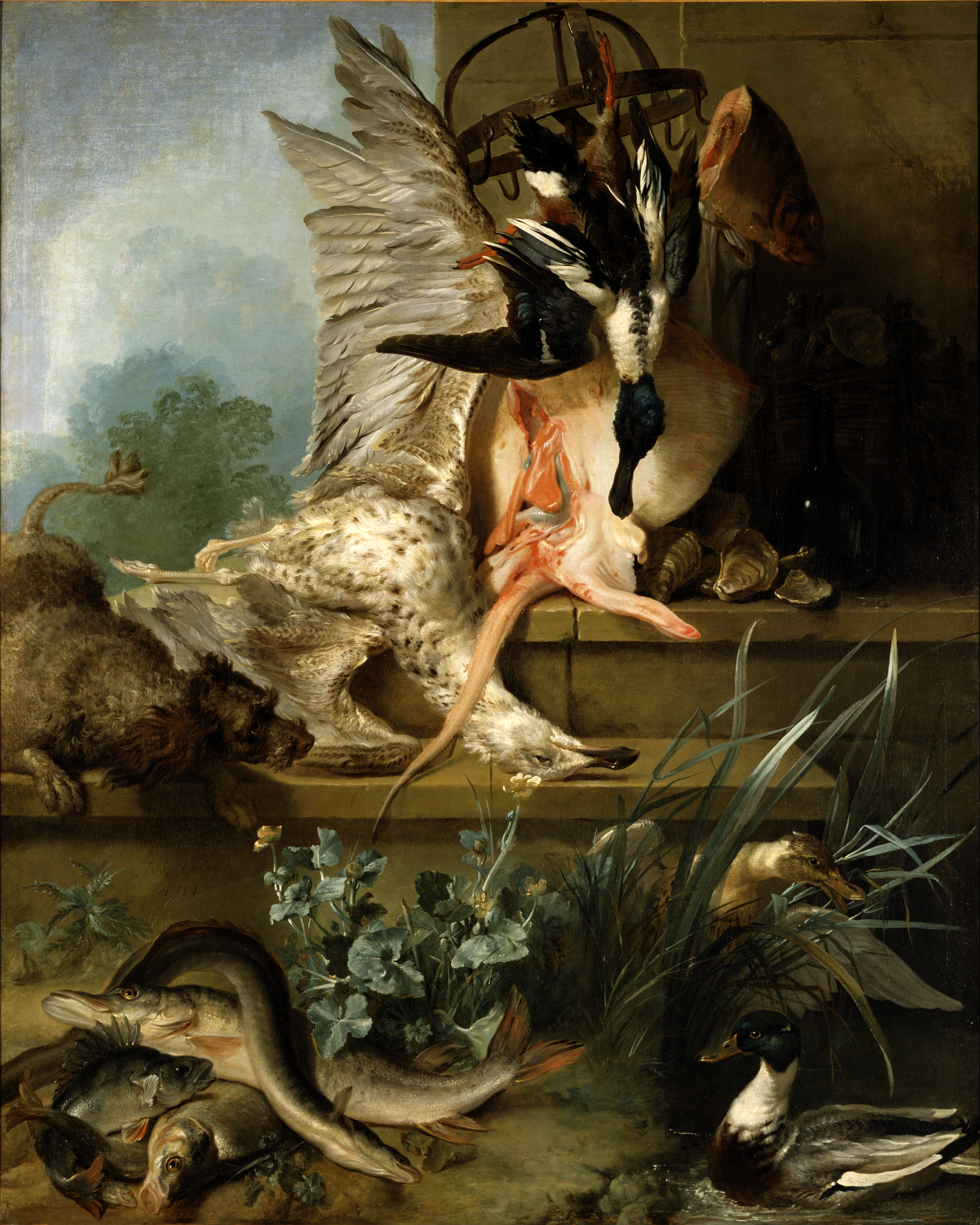
Still Life with a Spaniel Chasing Ducks "Water" (1719), 141 x 114 cm., Nationalmuseum

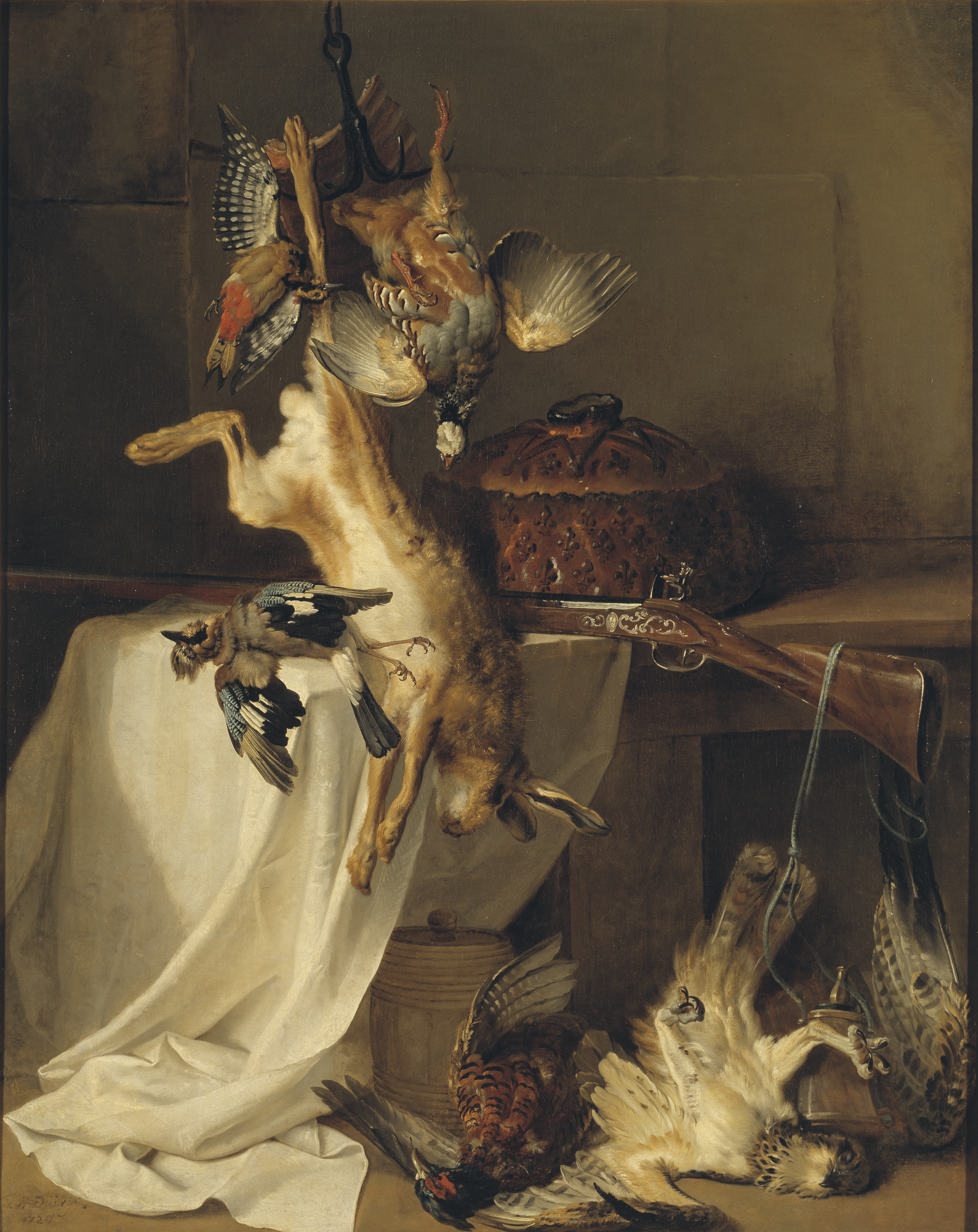
Still Life with a Rifle, Hare and Bird "Fire" (1720), 144 x 116 cm., Nationalmuseum

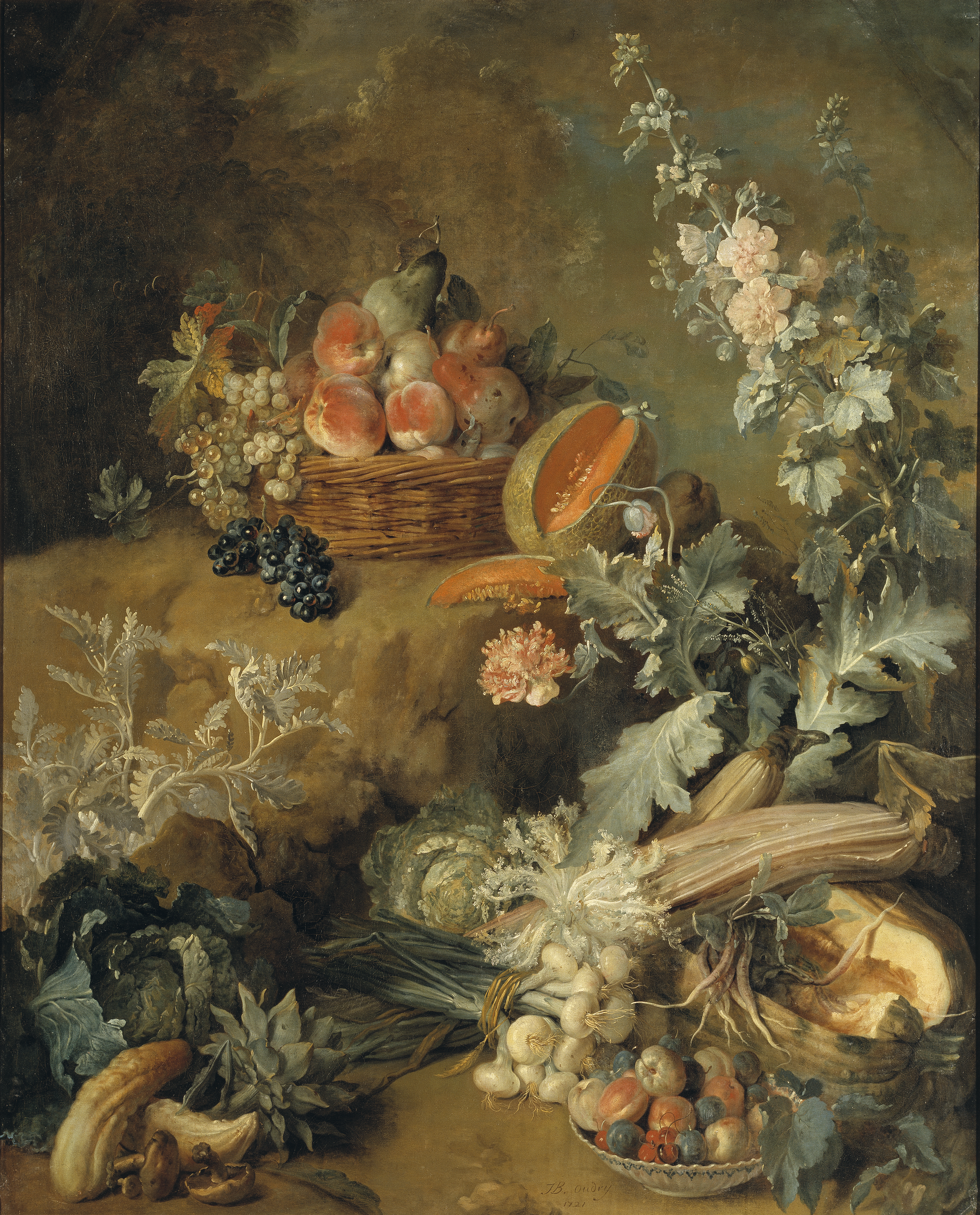
Still Life of Fruits and Vegetables "Earth" (1721), 145 x 113 cm., Nationalmuseum

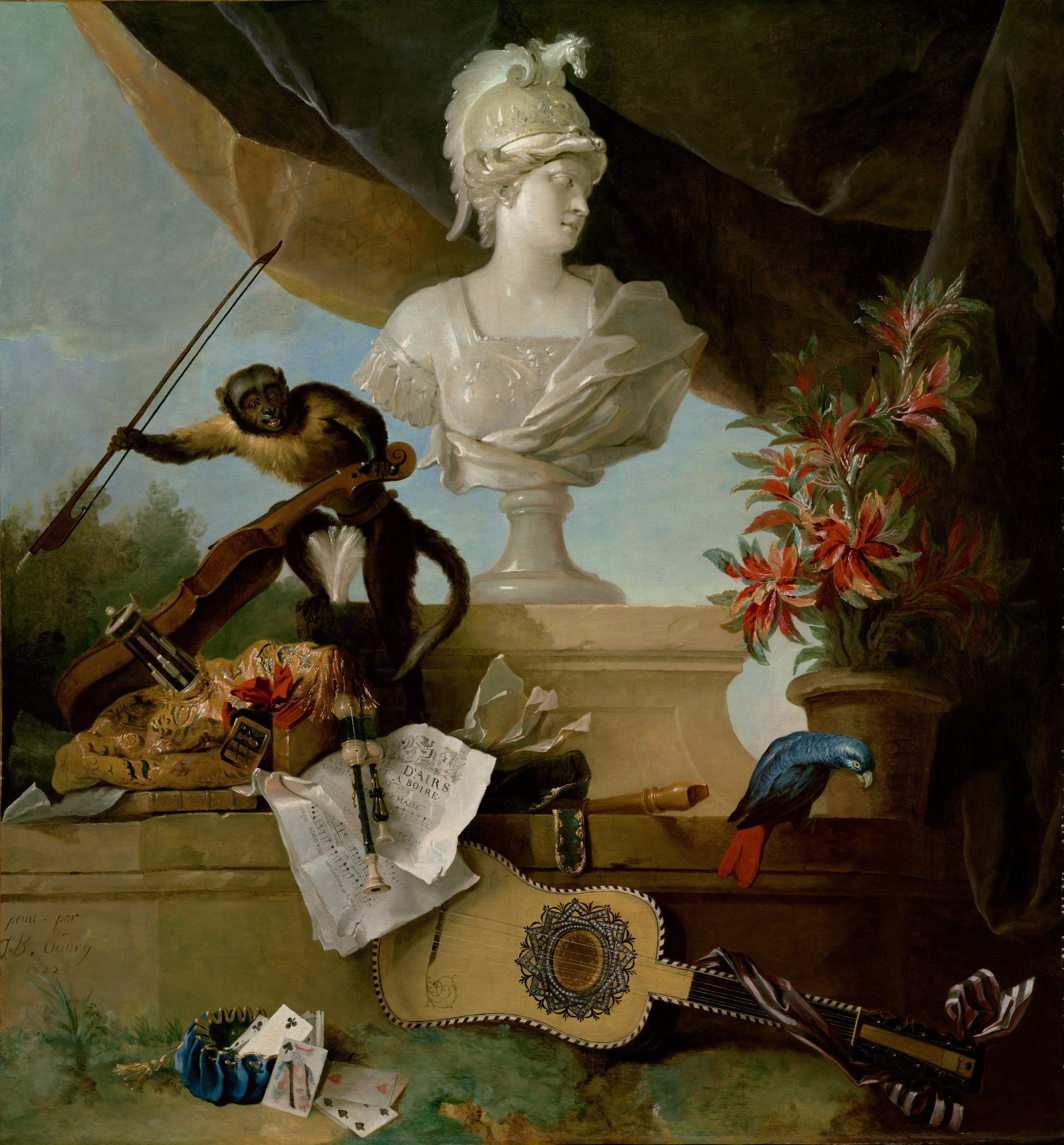
Allegory of Europe (1722), 161.9 × 151.8 cm., Museum of Fine Arts, Houston

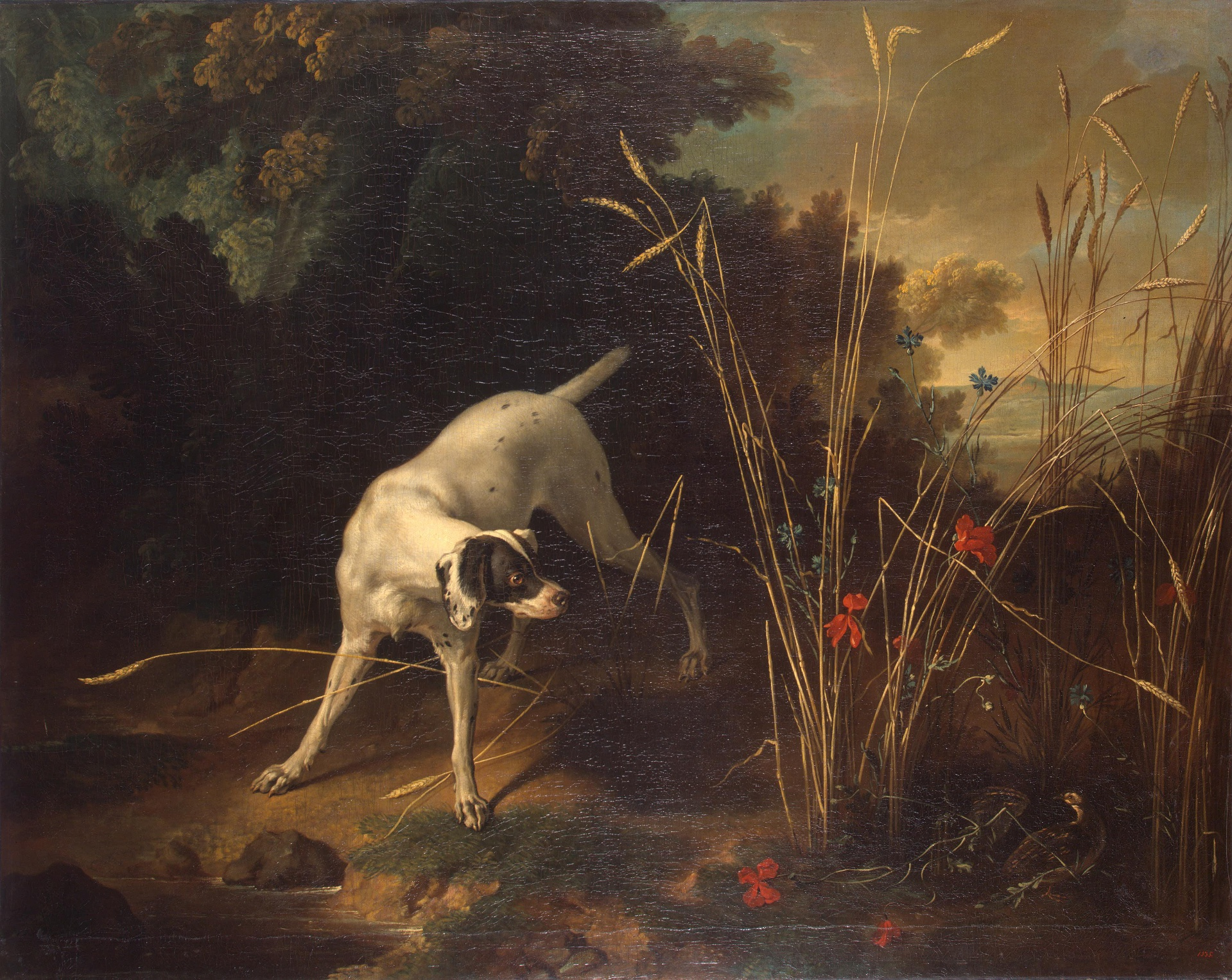
Dog Pointing a Partridge (1725), 129 x 162 cm. Hermitage Museum

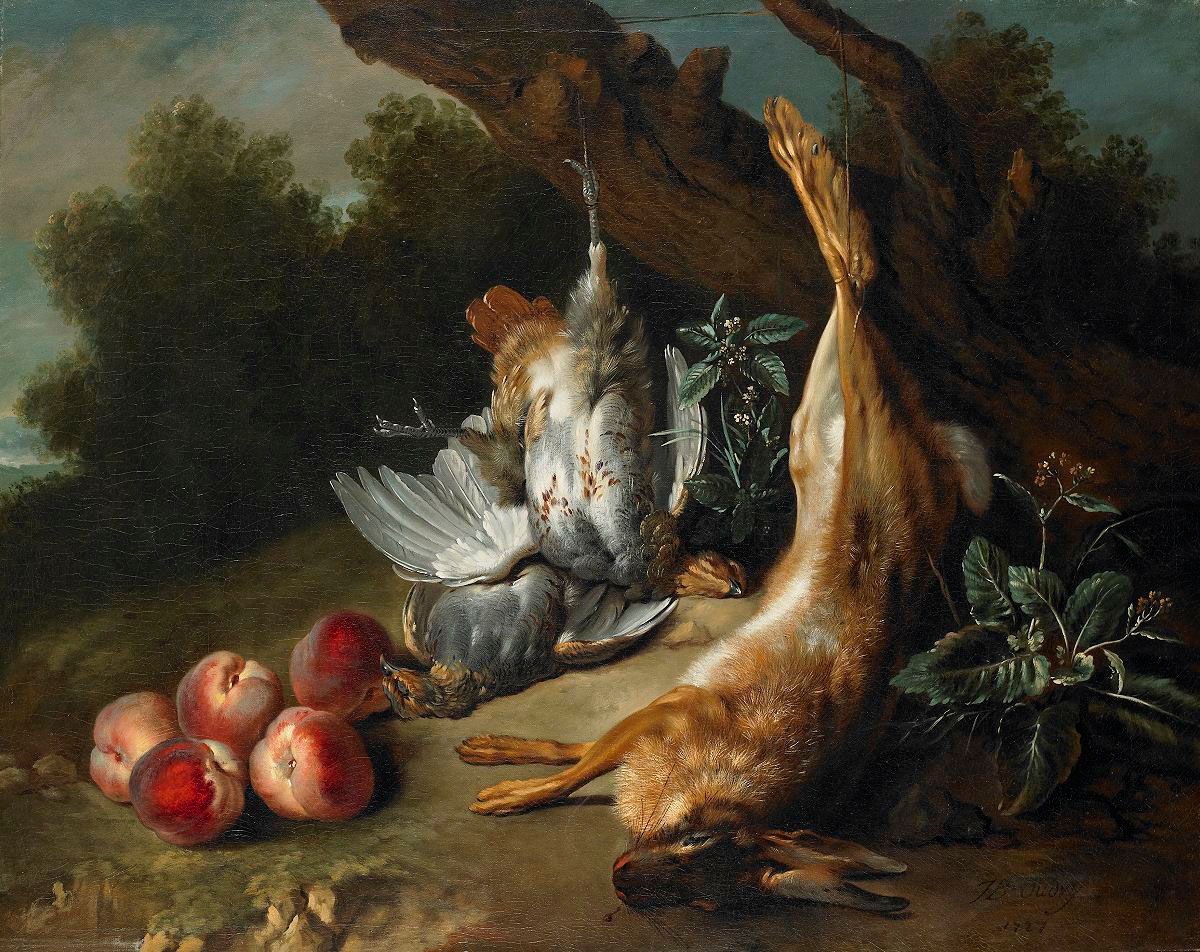
Still Life with Dead Game and Peaches in a Landscape, (1727), 80 x 100.3 cm., Birmingham Museum of Art

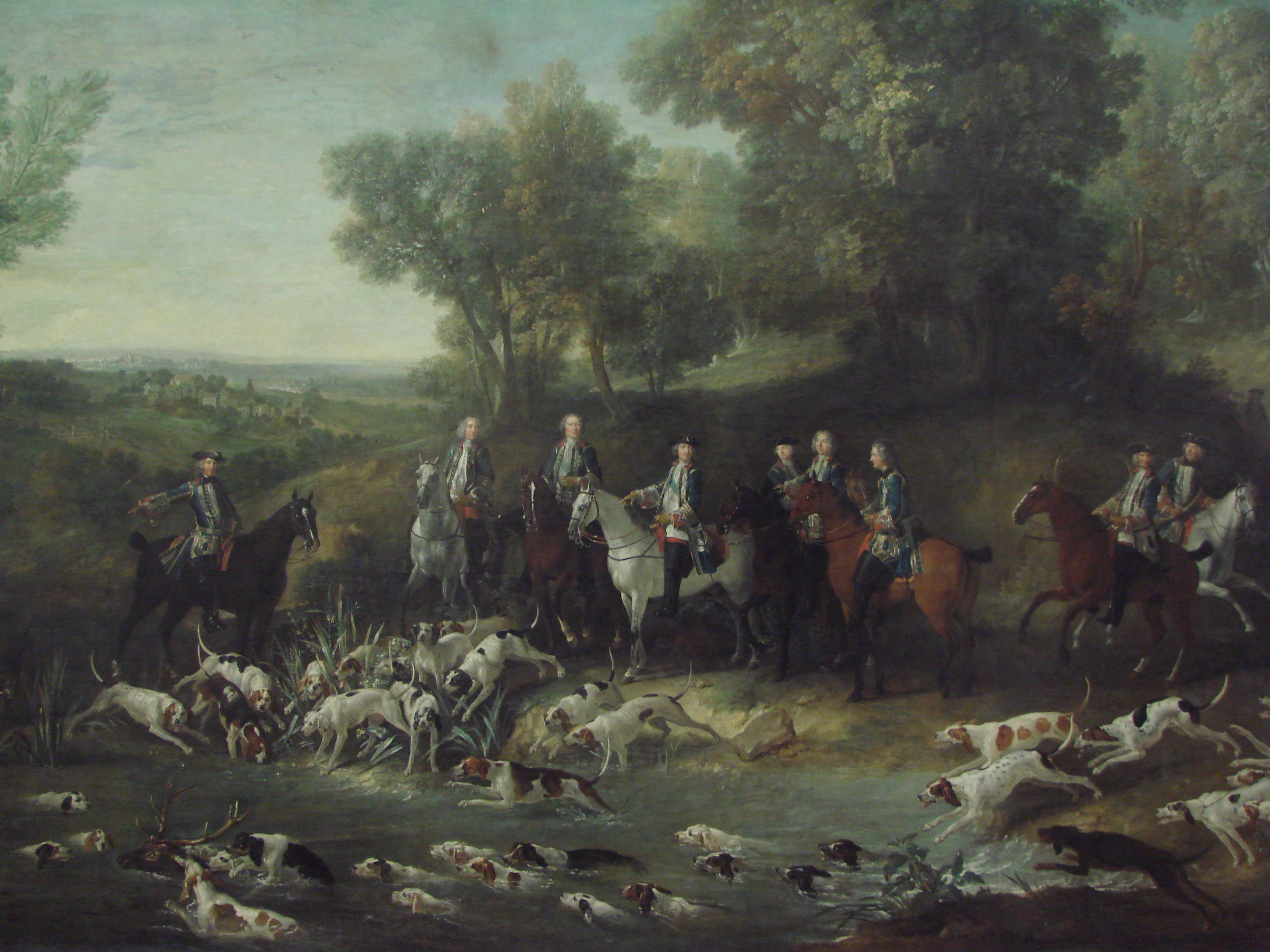
Louis XV hunting deer in the Saint-Germain forest, (1730), Musée des Augustins, Toulouse

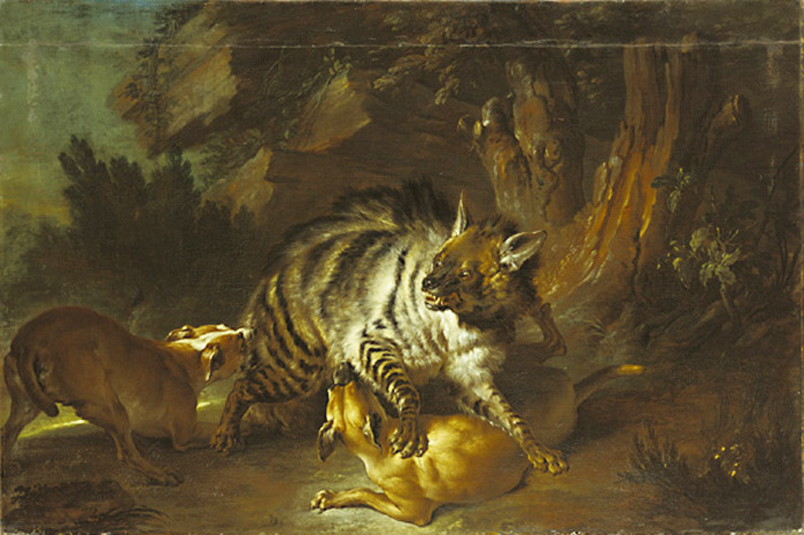
Hyena in the Fight with two Dogs (1739), 130 x 190 cm., Ludwigslust Palace

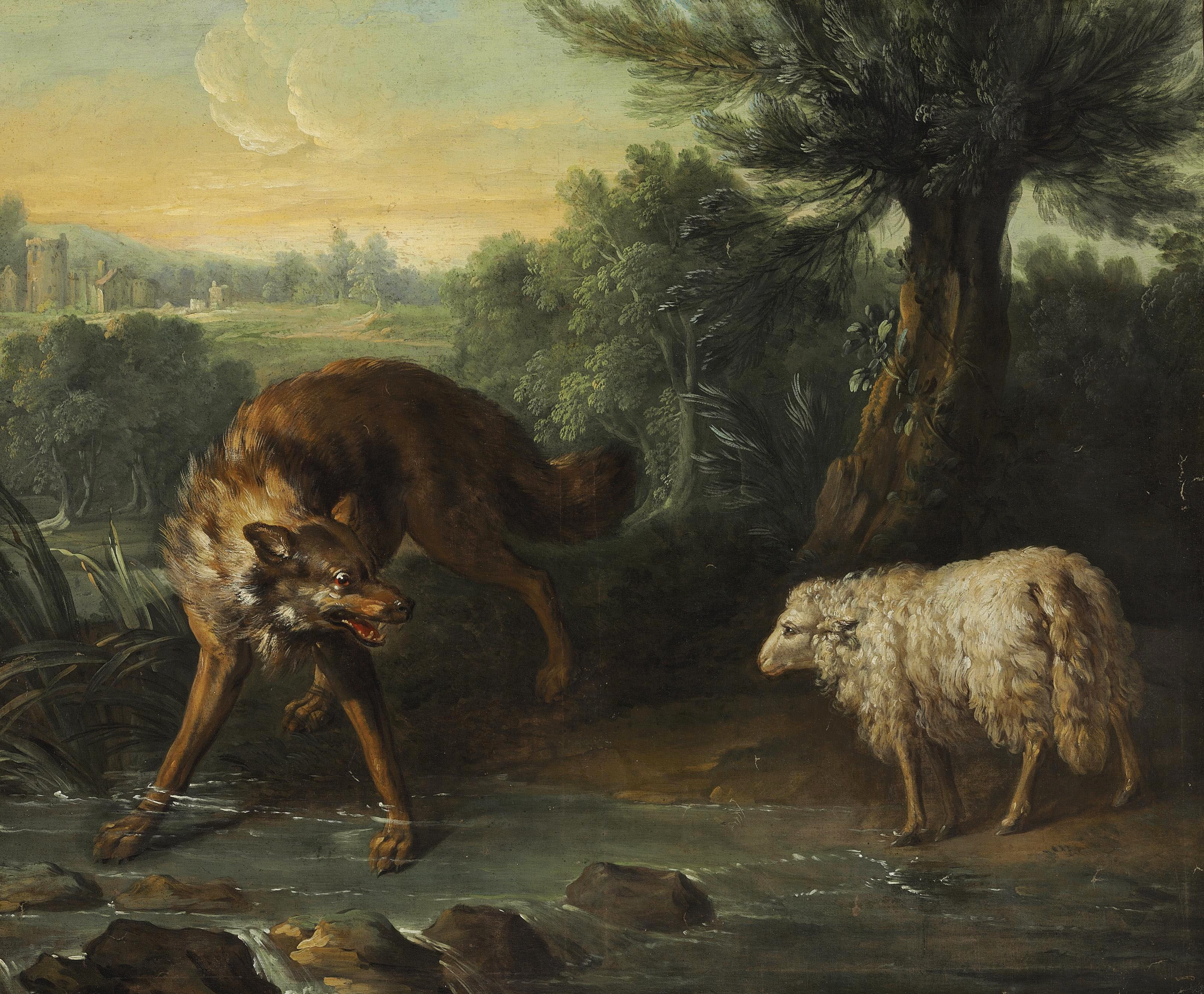
The Wolf and the Lamb. from La Fontaine Fables (no date), 104.1 x 125.7 cm., private collection

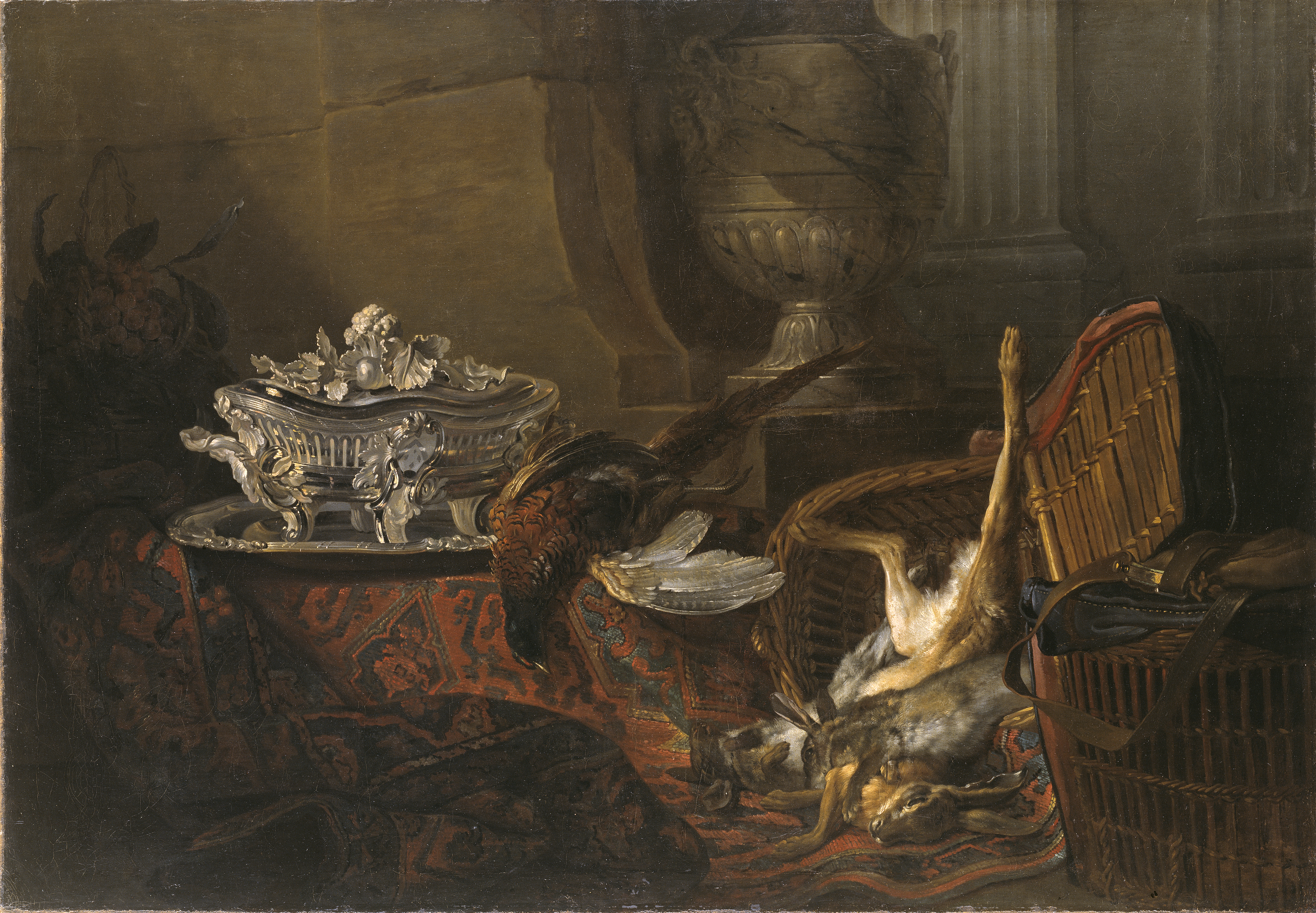
Still Life with Dead Game and a Silver Tureen on a Turkish Carpet (1738), 120 x 171 cm., Nationalmuseum

Dachshound Pehr with Game and Rifle (1740), 135 x 109 cm., Nationalmuseum

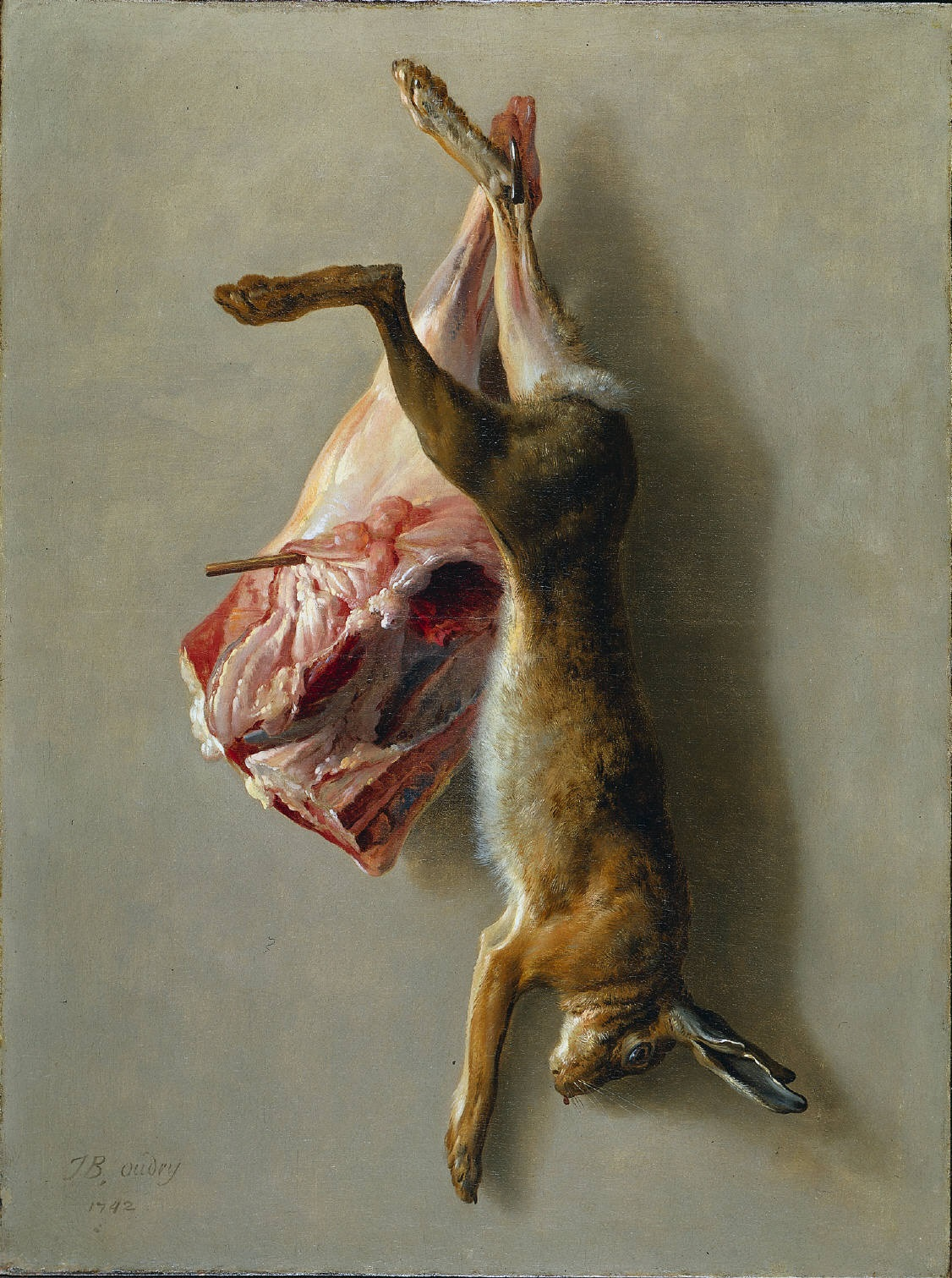
A Hare and a Leg of Lamb (1742), 98.2 x 73.5 cm., Cleveland Museum of Art

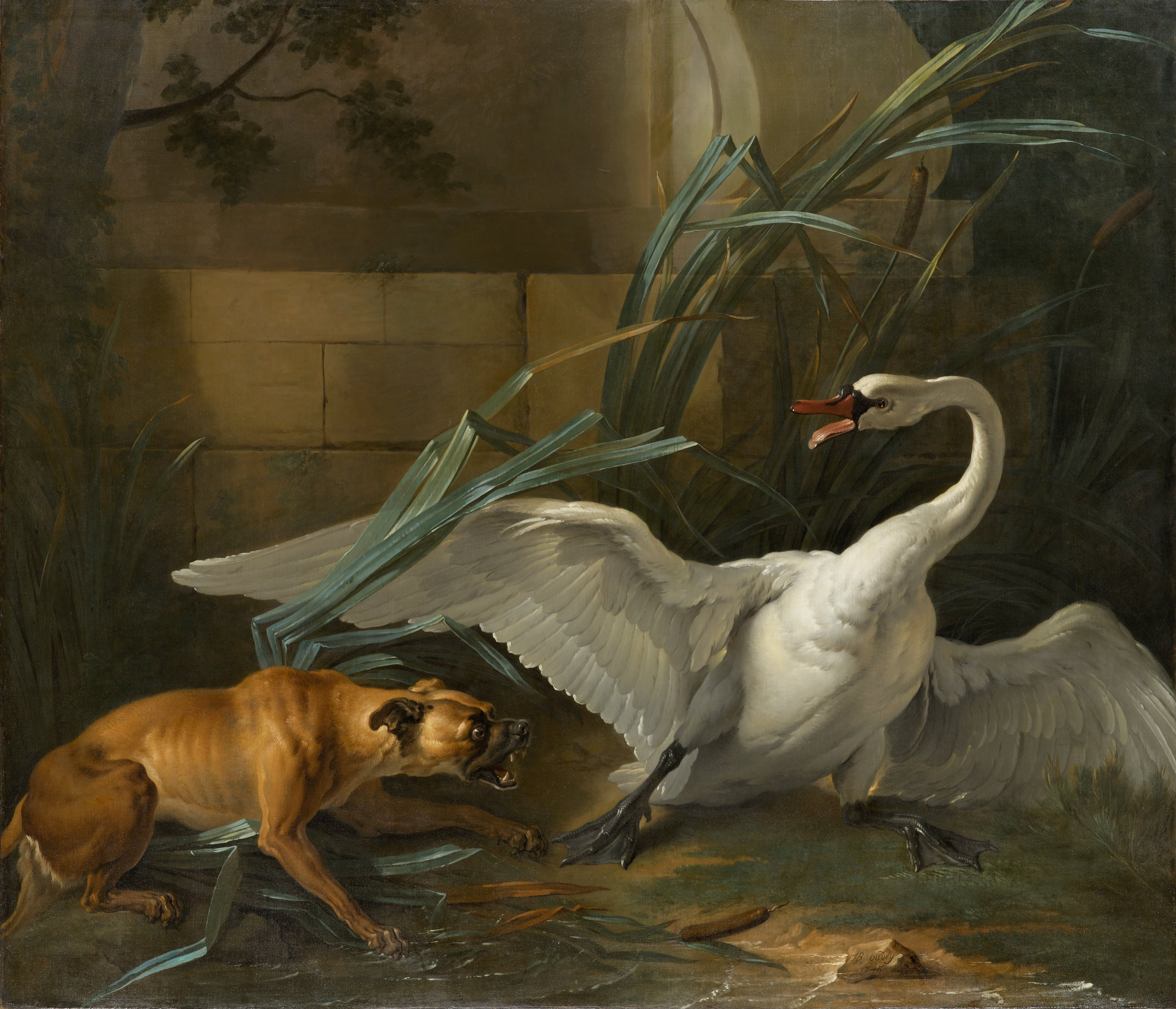
Swan Attacked by a Dog, (1745), 177.8 x 208.3 cm., North Carolina Museum of Art

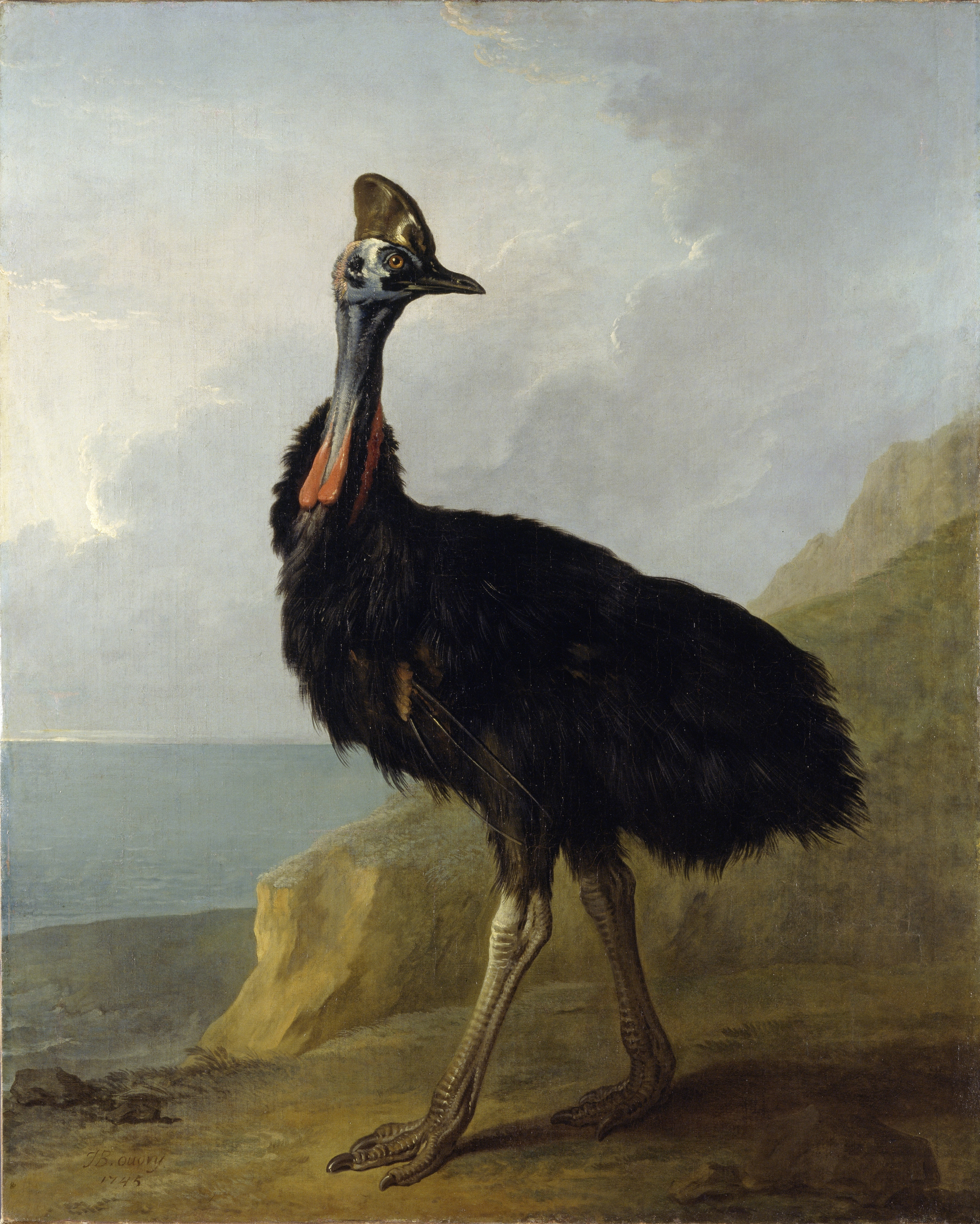
Cassowary (1745), 161.9 x 127.4 cm., Staatliches Museum Schwerin

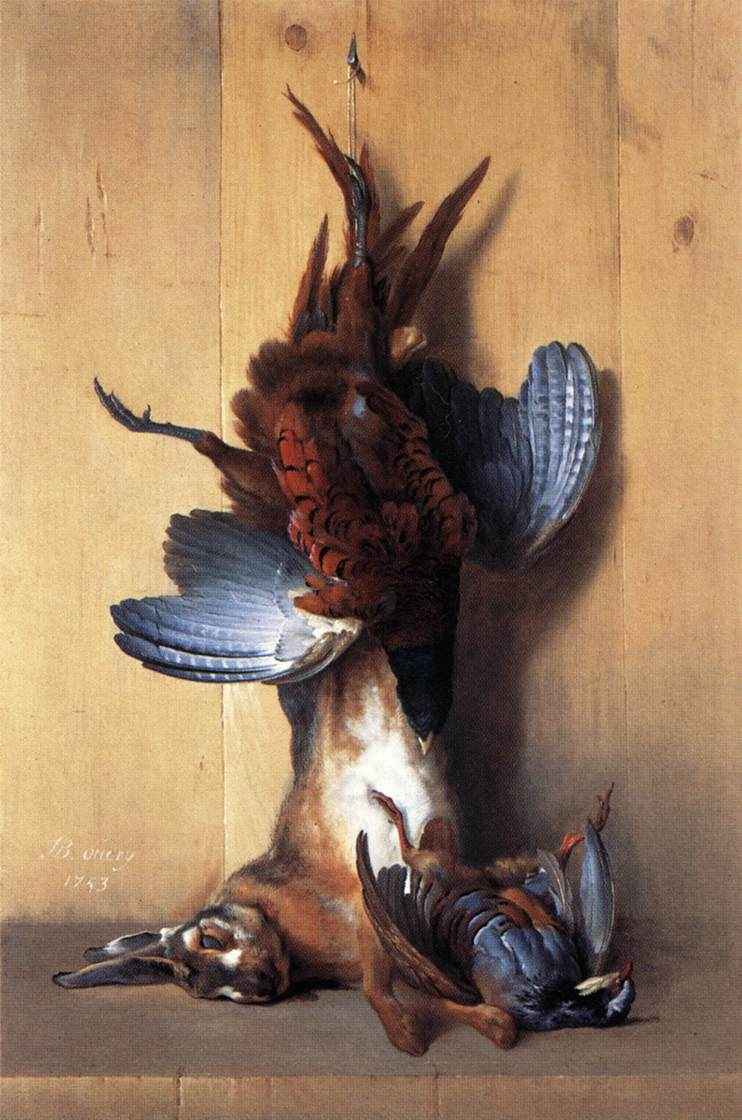
Still-life with Pheasant (1753), 97 x 64 cm., Louvre

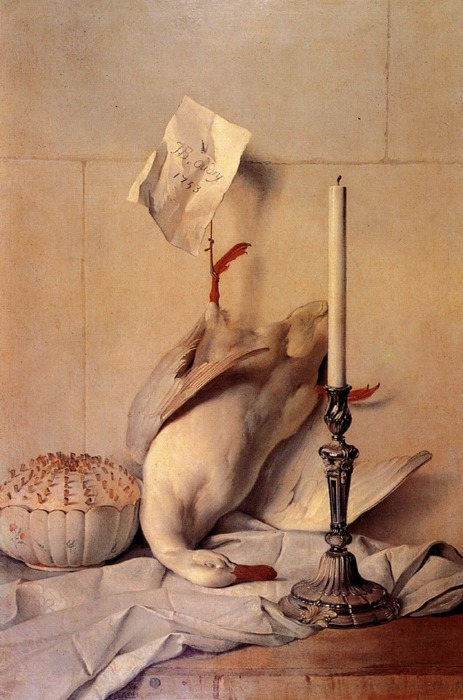
The White Duck (1753), 95.3 x 63.5 cm., Houghton Hall [stolen 1990]

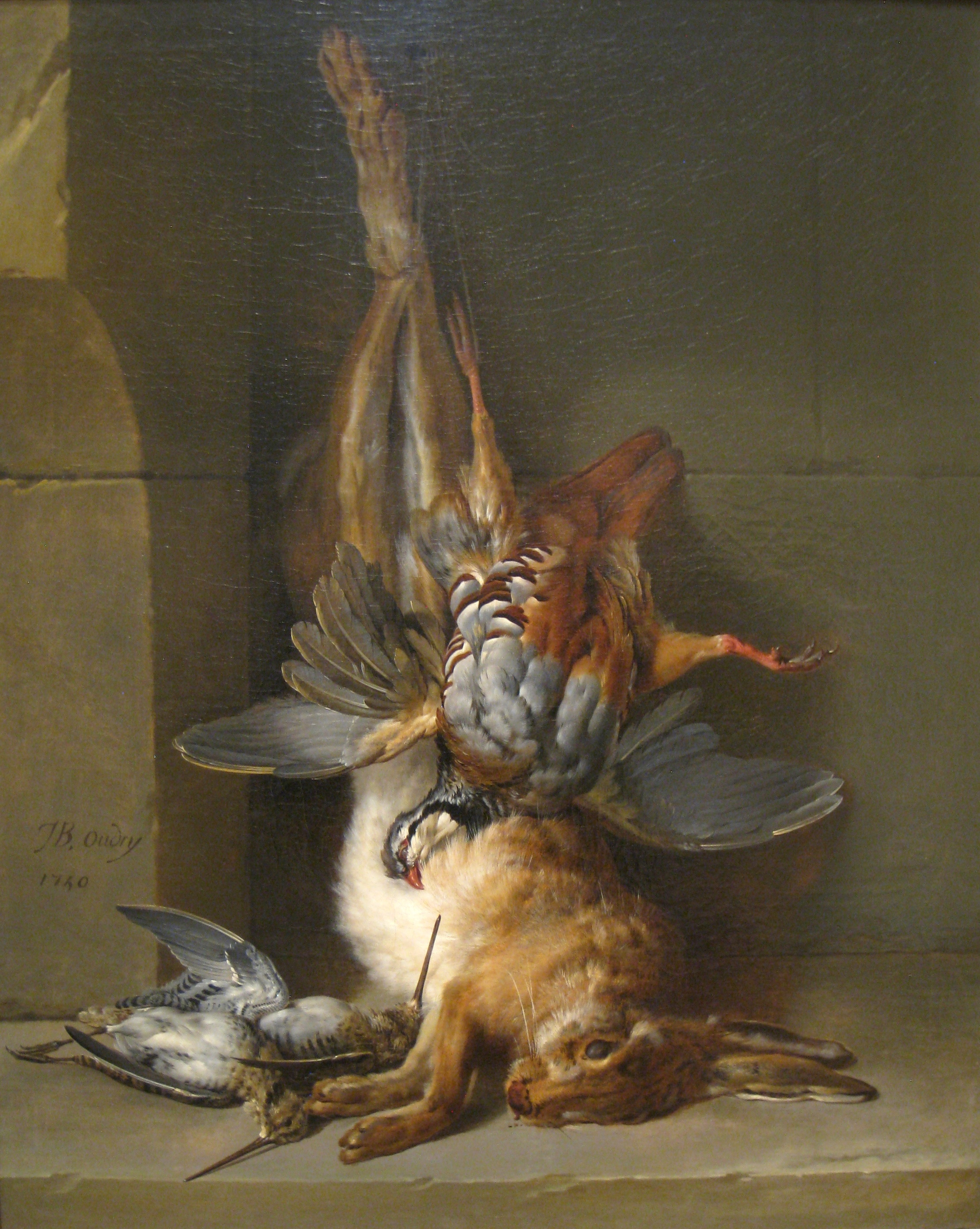
Still-life with Hare, Partridge and Snipe (ca. 1755), 82.2 x 66 cm., Worcester Art Museum

=== Textile designs ===
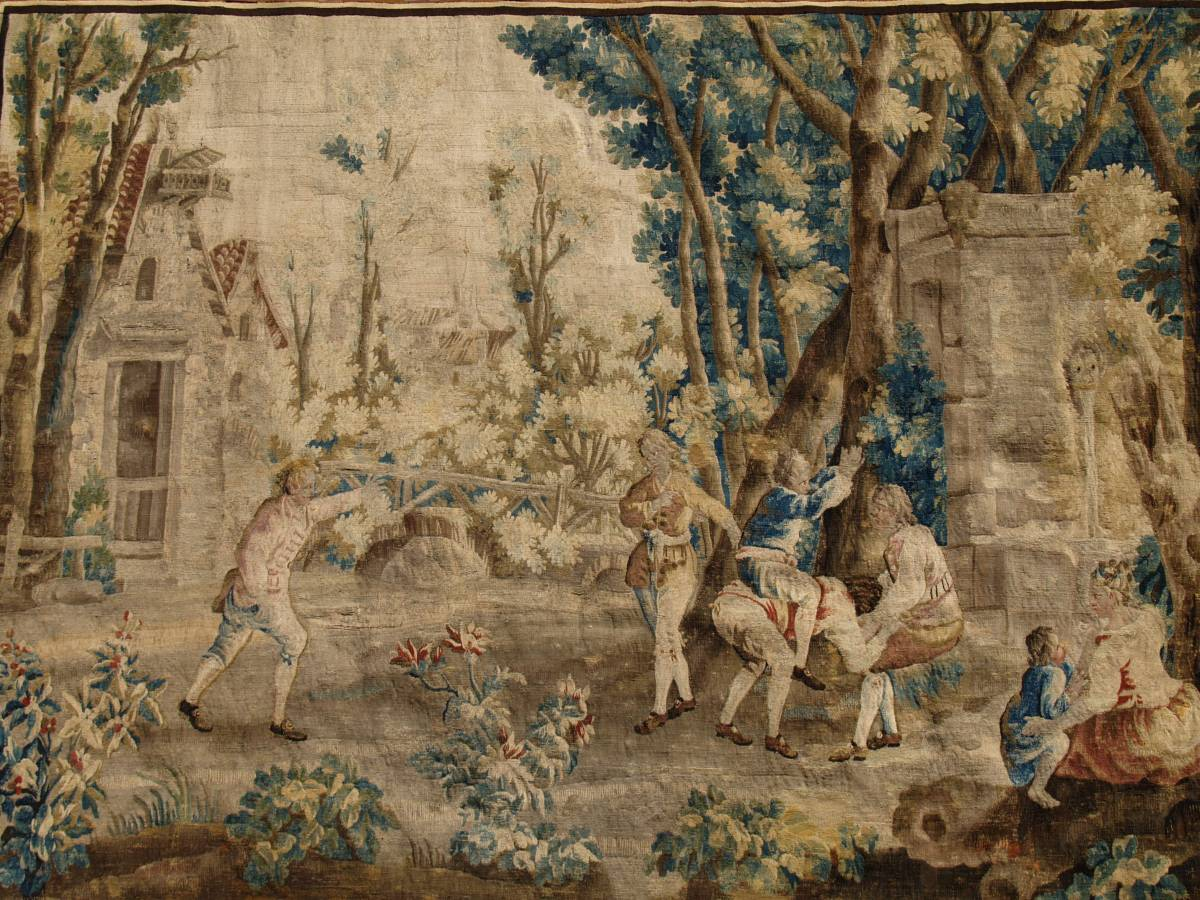
Les Amusements Champêtres: Le cheval fondu tapestry, from the Barlatier de Mas Collection

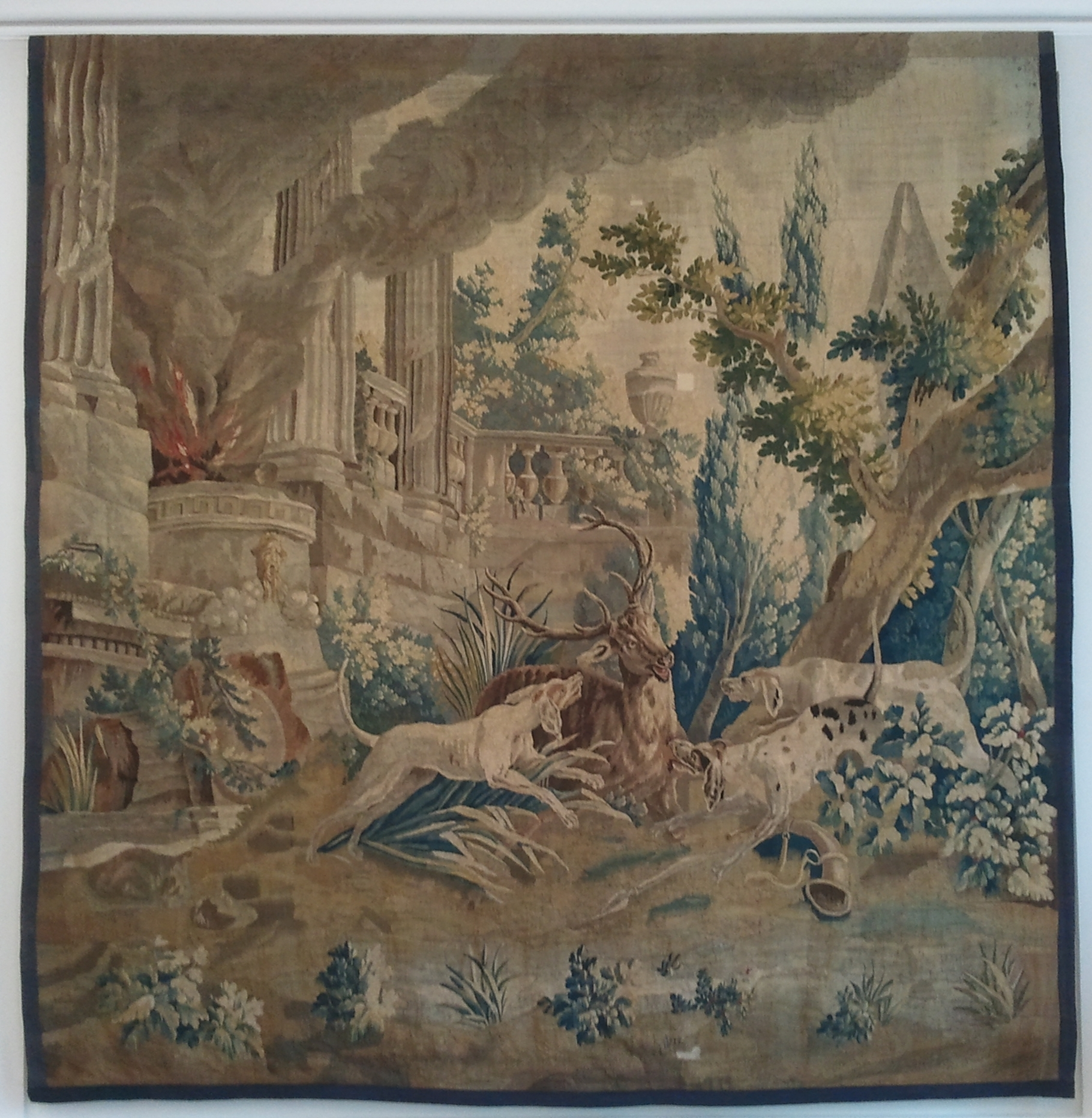
Gobelin "Aktaion" in the "Altes Rathaus" (Old Town Hall) of Bonn, Germany (1750)

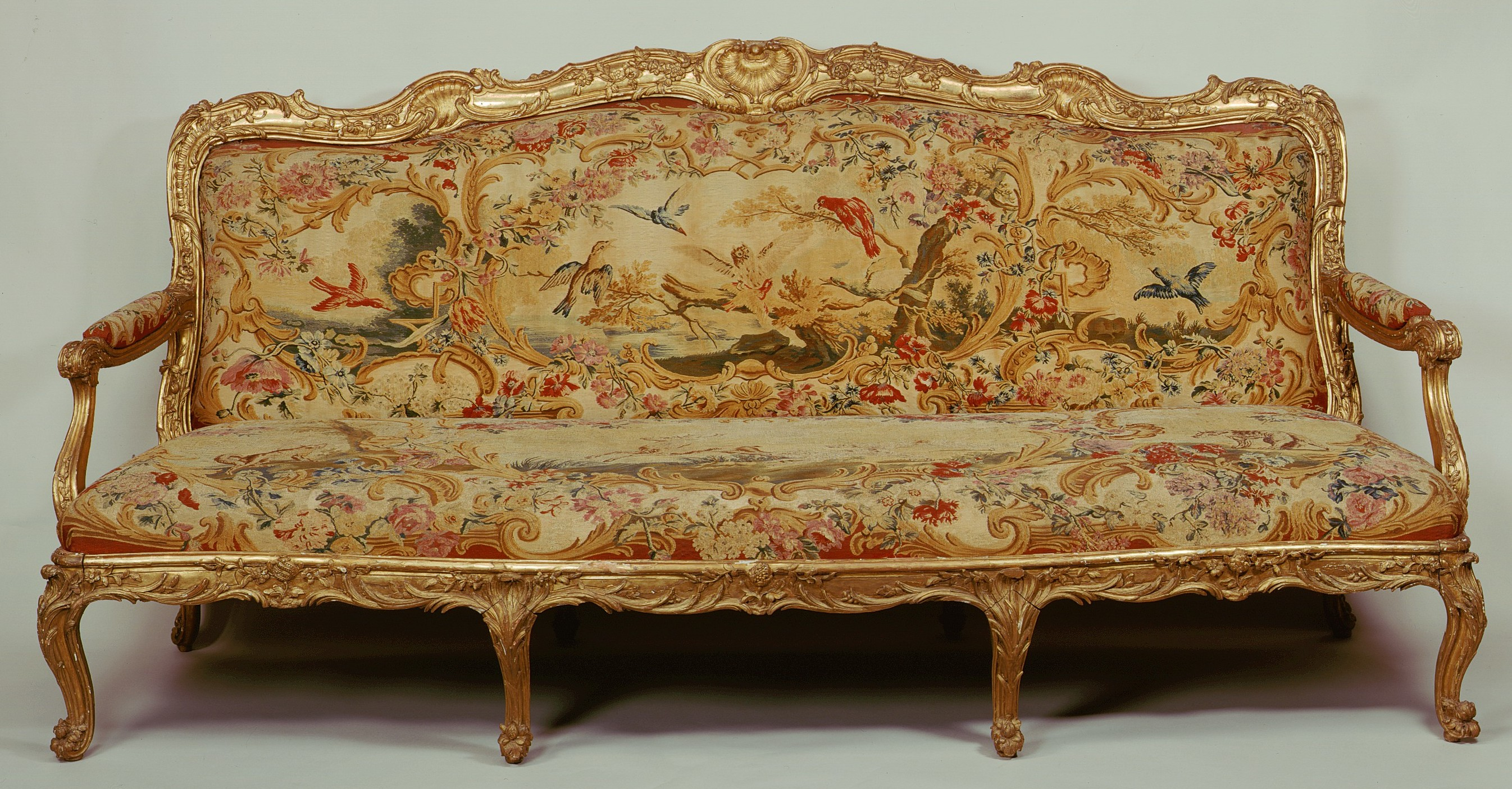
Settee (sofa) (ca 1754 –56), carved and gilded beech; wool and silk tapestry, 111.8 x 235 x 81.3 cm., Metropolitan Museum of Art

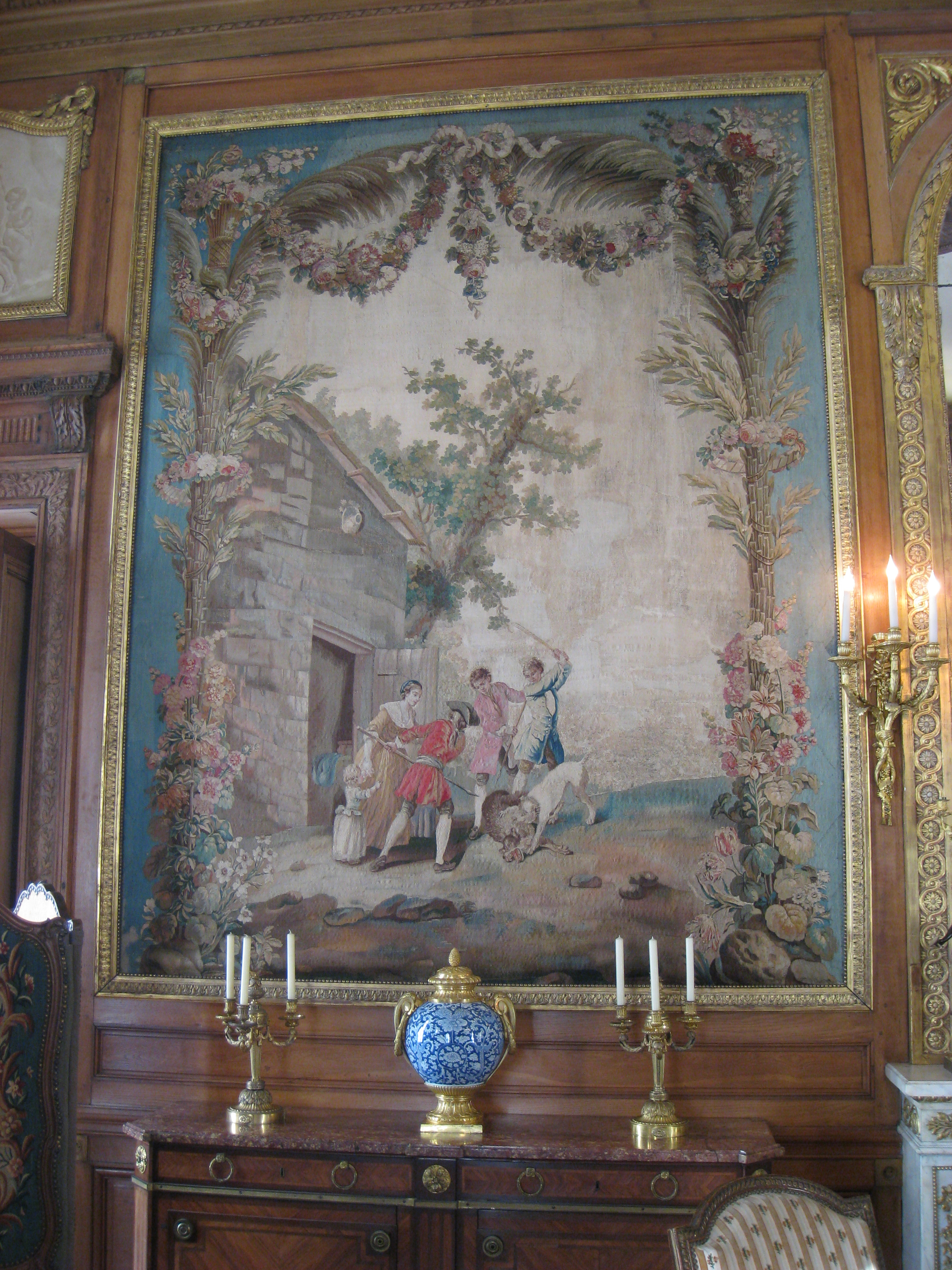
The Lion in Love, Aubusson tapestry (ca. 1775–1780), after J-B. Oudry, Musée Nissim de Camondo, Paris.
