= The Pastoral Amusements =

Tapestry series

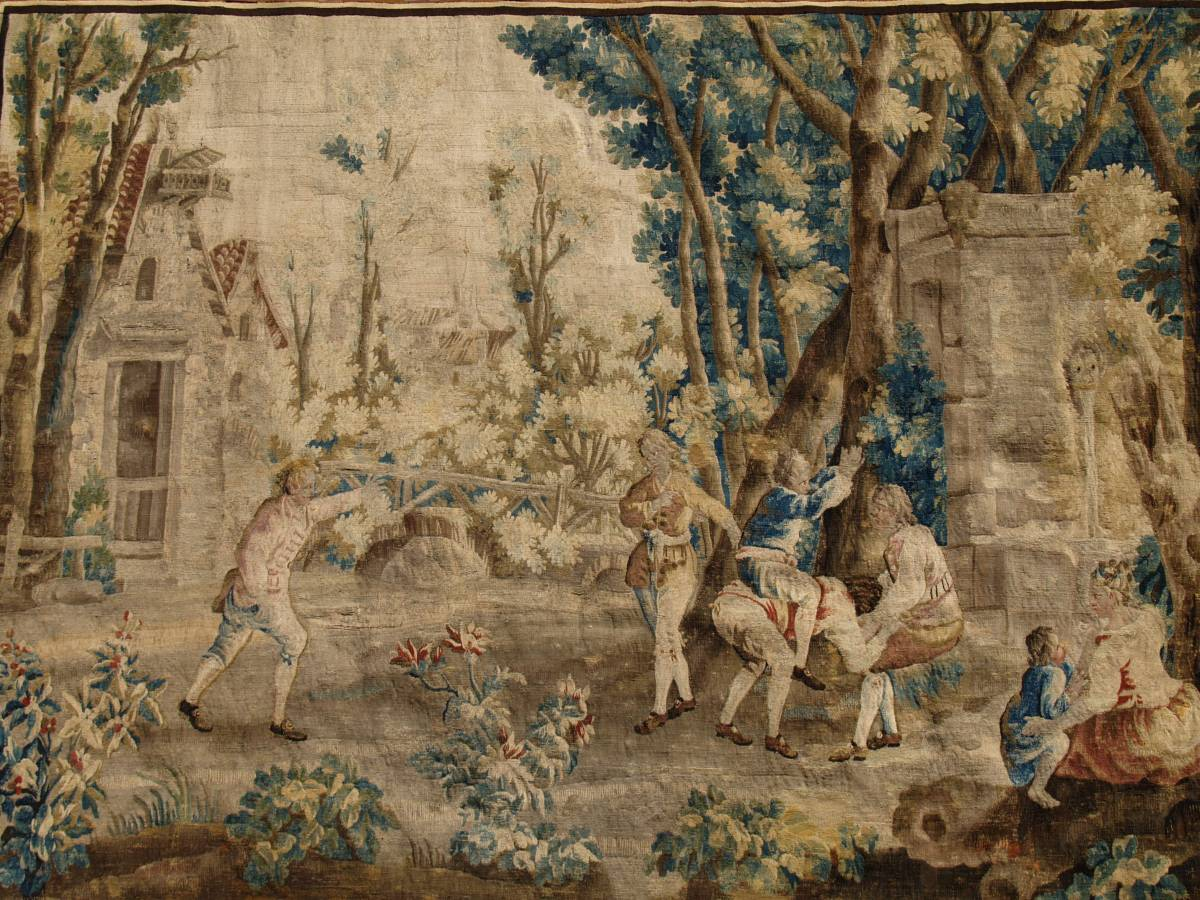
Le Cheval Fondu Tapestry, from the Barlatier de Mas Collection, Sotogrande, Spain

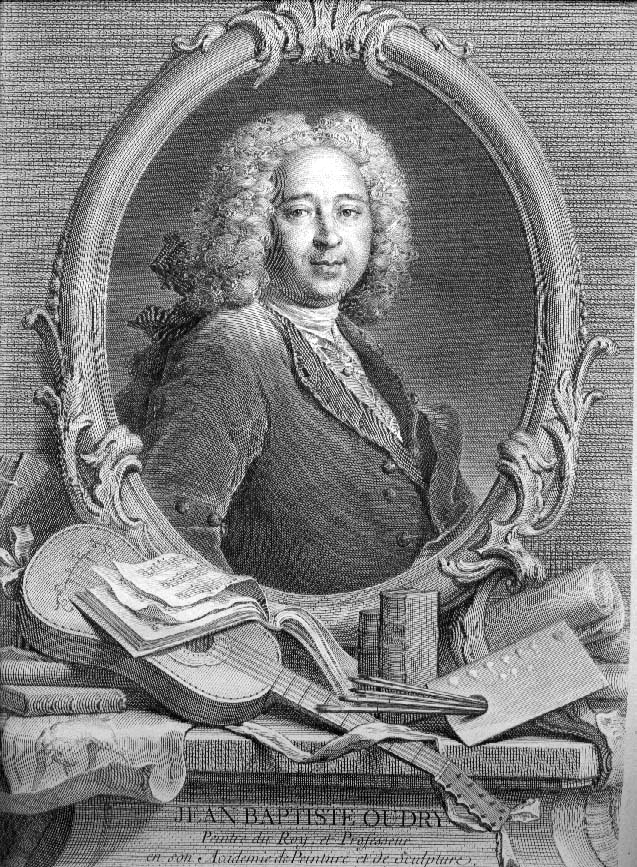
Jean-Baptiste Oudry, etching made by his wife, Marie-Marguerite Froissé, after a painting by Nicolas de Largillière.

The Pastoral Amusements, (French: Les Amusements champêtres) is a series of tapestries designed between 1720 and 1730 by Jean-Baptiste Oudry for Noël-Antoine de Mérou, then director of the Royal Beauvais Tapestry Manufactory. The first production of the designs took place at Beauvais in 1731. After enjoying huge success the series was later adapted and further developed at Aubusson by Jean-Baptiste Huet the elder (d. 1811).

== There are eight designs in the original series ==
1. Le cheval fondu
2. Colin-maillard
3. La Bergère
4. Le pied de Boeuf
5. Le joueur d'Osselets
6. La Balançoire
7. Le joueur de broches
8. Le joueur de musette
