= A Hare and a Leg of Lamb =

1742 painting by Jean-Baptiste Oudry

Un lièvre et un gigot de mouton (A Hare and a Leg of Lamb)
- Artist: Jean-Baptiste Oudry
- Year: 1742
- Medium: Oil on canvas
- Movement: Rococo
- Dimensions: 98.2 cm × 73.5 cm (38.7 in × 28.9 in)
- Location: Cleveland Museum of Art; Cleveland, Ohio

A Hare and a Leg of Lamb (French: Un lièvre et un gigot de mouton) is a 1742 painting by French Rococo painter and engraver Jean-Baptiste Oudry.

== Description ==
The painting employs a trompe-l'œil technique and shows a skinned leg of lamb behind a dead hare, depicted with its eye open and a single drop of blood hanging from the end of its nose. The hare and the leg of lamb are nailed together to a wall.

Oudry was known for his canvases featuring dead game, and A Hare and a Leg of Lamb has been described as, "uncannily real." Others have criticized the canvas as, "lifeless and inert...both highly contrived and utterly dead."

The painting was originally commissioned to be hung in a dining room.
