= Hunting of Birds with a Hawk and a Bow =

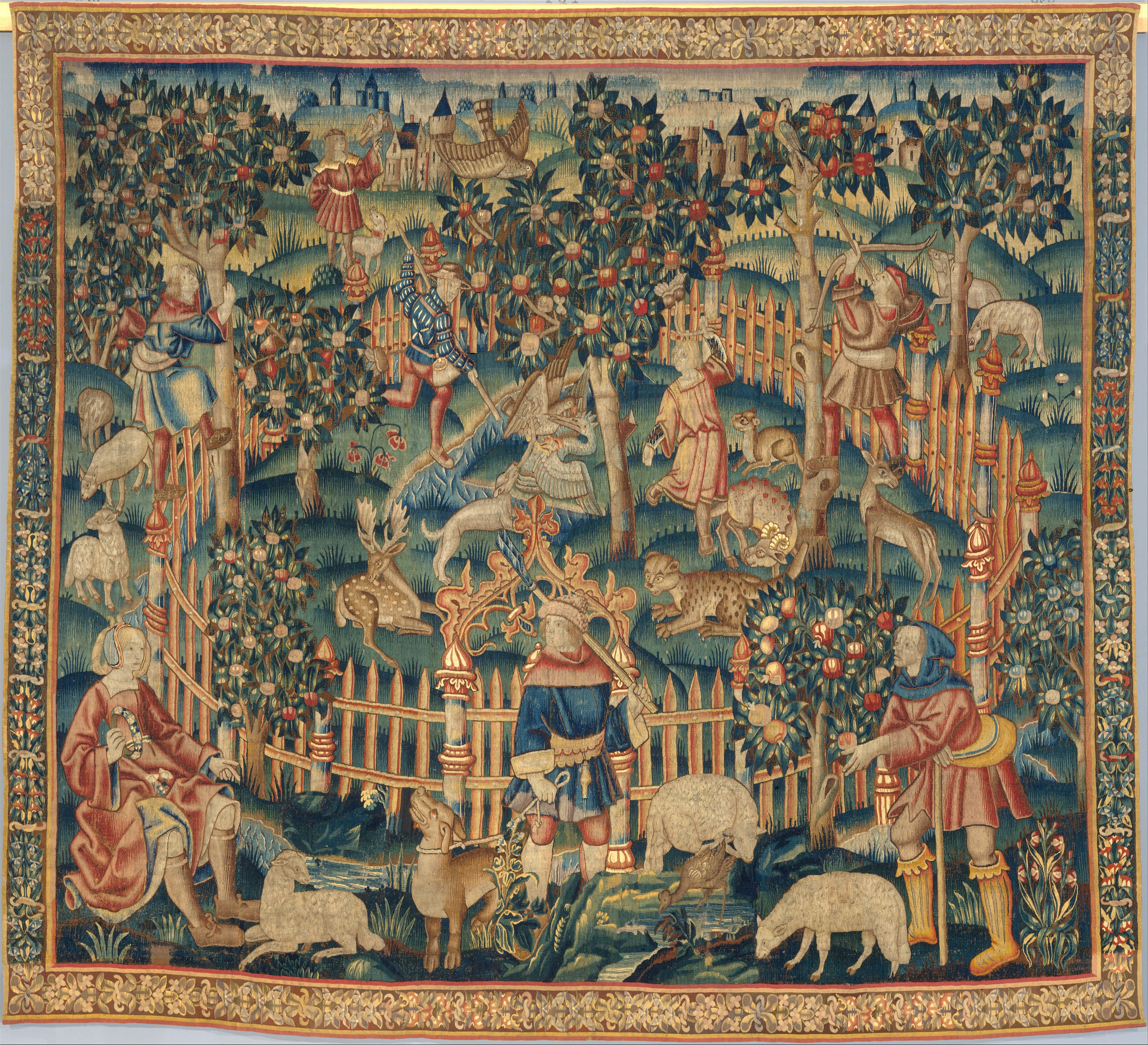
- Medium: c. 1515–1535
- Dimensions: 337.8 cm × 384.8 cm (133.0 in × 151.5 in)
- Location: Metropolitan Museum of Art; New York

Hunting of Birds with a Hawk and a Bow is a 16th-century tapestry in the collection of the Metropolitan Museum of Art. Woven from dyed wool and silk thread, the tapestry is part of a larger series of hunting tapestries attributed to the Southern Netherlands.
