= Affrilachia =

African American residents of Appalachia

Affrilachians
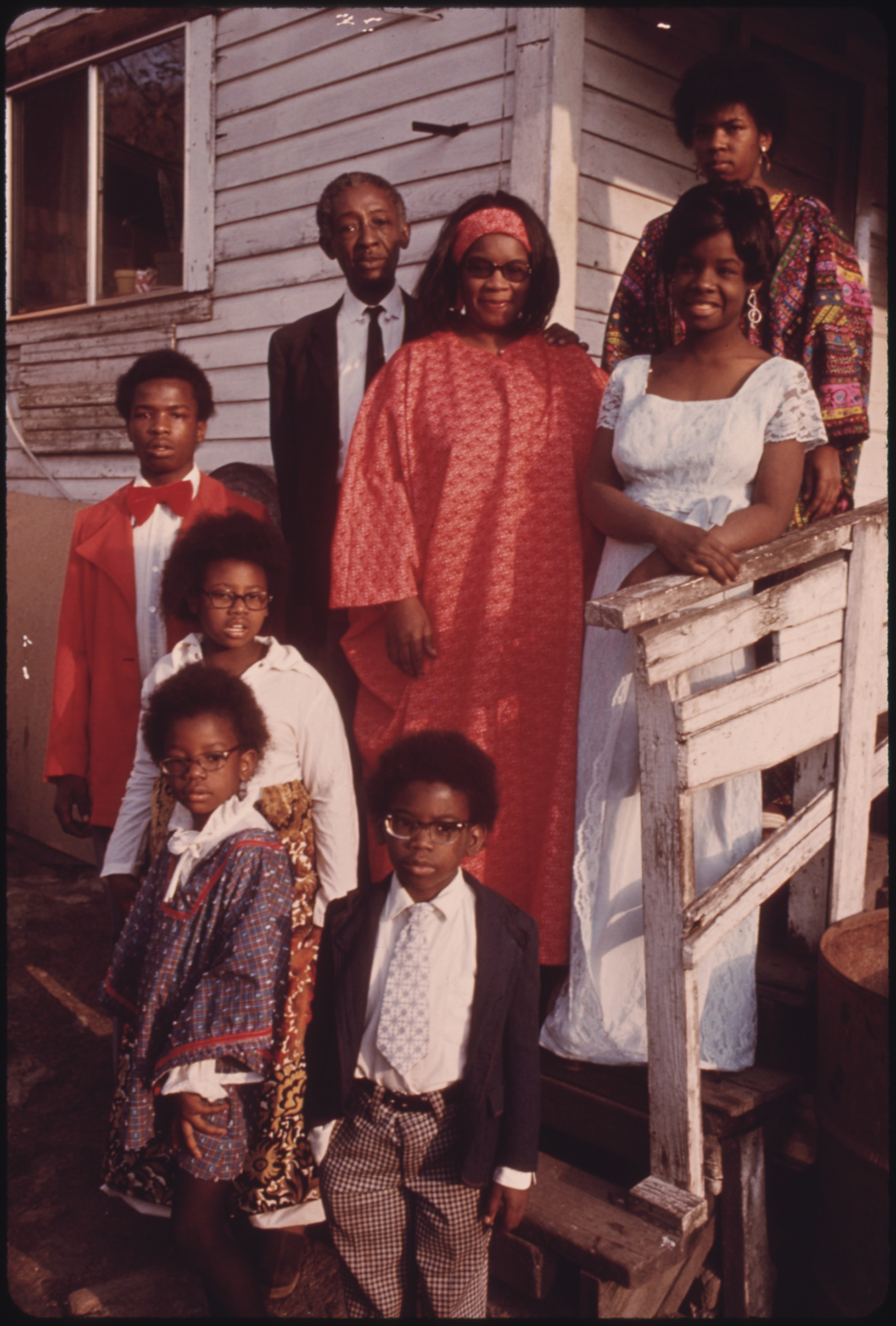
- An Affrilachian family, 1974.

Total population
- around 900,000 (Appalachian Regional Commission, 2024 estimate)

Regions with significant populations
- Blue Ridge Mountains, Central and Southern Appalachia, including West Virginia, Eastern Kentucky Coalfield, SWVA, East Tennessee, WNC, North Georgia

Languages
- English: Affrilachian, Ebonics

Religion
- Baptist, Methodist, Holiness Pentecostalism. A minority are Catholic or practice folk religions (Granny magic, Hoodoo)

Related ethnic groups
- Melungeon, Carmel Indians, Chestnut Ridge people, Black Ozarkers, African-Americans, Appalachians

Affrilachia is a term that refers to the people, the culture and the contributions of Black Appalachian artists, writers, musicians, and residents in the Southern Appalachian region of the United States. The term "Affrilachia" is attributed to Kentucky-based writer Frank X. Walker, who began using it in the 1990s as a way to negate stereotypes of Appalachian culture, which often portrays Appalachians as predominantly white and living in small mountain communities. Affrilachians are an African-American ethnic group, descended from the inhabitants of Southern and Central Appalachia during periods of colonial and US rule. They share a common heritage and culture, often mixing African traditions with those of European settlers and natives Appalachians.

== Etymology ==
The appellation refers to an African American who is a native of, or resident in the Appalachian region. The word "Affrilachia" is included in the second edition of the Oxford American Dictionary.

== History ==
Affrilachians have existed since the early origin of the United States and the establishment of colonial communities within Appalachia. They have resided there both as enslaved and free persons. Affrilachians are sometimes recognized as one of the three groups known for their significant role in the history of Southern Appalachia, the other two being Native Appalachians, like the Cherokee and Yuchi, and the white European settlers, mainly Anglo-Celtic or German.

Affrilachians entered into Appalachia in waves; including those who arrived with white settlers, and those who arrived after 1880 and Reconstruction.

=== Origins ===
Affrilachians are a subset of African Americans. African Americans have origins predominantly in West Africa, Central Africa, Western Europe, and, to a lesser extent, North America. African ethnic groups that are ancestral to African Americans include the Mandinka, Yoruba, Igbo, Fula, Akan, and Kongo, among others. Some African entered the Americas free or as Atlantic Creoles; others entered as slaves. From 1492 to 1880, 12.5 million Africans and up to 5.5 million Amerindians were enslaved in the USA.

=== 16th Century ===
The earliest known Africans who came to live in the southern Appalachian Mountains arrived around the Age of Discovery and Mississippian shatter zone, often with explorers like Spanish conquistadors. Affrilachians and Native Americans have interacted at least since this era.

One of the earliest accounts of African people in Appalachia is seen in Hernando de Soto's expeditions. De Soto forced The Lady of Cofitachequi, whose Mississippian paramountcy bordered the Appalachian Mountains, to be his guide in the Appalachian Mountains. When she escaped, was accompanied by her own Native American servants as well as enslaved people of Africa or Afro-Caribbean descent defecting from de Soto's expedition. One enslaved man returned to de Soto's party and reported that the lady had taken one of the escaped slaves as her lover and partner.

=== Colonial and Revolutionary eras ===
Affrilachians and Native Americans, particularly the Cherokee, had extensive social interactions due to both groups being enslaved by white settlers; this began to decline after the Yamasee War, which lasted from 1715 to 1717. Theda Perdue of the University of North Carolina at Chapel Hill recorded that "In 1763, whites agreed to pay Indians one musket and three blankets, the equivalent of thirty-five deerskins, for each black slave captured and returned."

==== Relationship with the Cherokee ====
By the time of the American Revolution, the Cherokee had begun to participate in the slave economy of Southern America; they were known to capture Black enslaved people from one settler community and sell them to another. Slave raids perpetrated by Native Americans began to diminish after 1794; which was marked by the scalping of the Cherokee slave raider Chief Benge of the Chikamauga, who abducted 2 white women and 3 slaves in Southwest Virginia, before being killed by the Virginia militia under Colonel Arthur Campbell on behalf of Governor Henry Lee.

Colonists actively conspired to disrupt friendly relationships and cause hostilities between the Affrilachians and the Cherokee; Affrilachian soldiers participated in the Yamasee War against the Yamasee (among other Native Americans) and slaveholders were forbidden from bringing slaves into Cherokee towns to prevent any opportunity of cross-racial interactions.

==== Free Blacks and Maroons ====
If any negroes shall run away into the woods from their English masters, the Cherokees shall endeavor to apprehend them and bring them to the plantation from which they ran away, or to the Governor, and for every slave so apprehended and brought back, the Indian that brings him shall receive a gun and a matchcoat.

— The Treaty of Whitehall (1730)

In the colonial era, enslaved African-Americans were known to escape into the Backcountry in search of freedom.

In colonial and revolutionary era Virginia, there was a dichotomy between the Appalachian region, where refuge from slavery and discrimination could be found, and the Tidewater Region, with a plantation-heavy economy. Slaveholders feared that escaped slaves in the Appalachian territory of the Cherokee would form powerful maroon communities. In one effort to prevent this, the Treaty of Whitehall was formed between the English and Cherokee in 1730, which stated that the Cherokee must return escaped slaves in return for compensation.

Affrilachian settlements have been by recorded in western North Carolina since at least 1780 by local Appalachian historians. Texana, one of North Carolina's largest Affrilachian communities, was established at least as early as 1850 in Cherokee Country as an independent, non-slave settlement. It was established by the McClelland family, who migrated from Avery County. The community was named after the original McClelland family's daughter.

Other communities established by free Black people and Maroons in the Antebellum era include Free Hill, Tennessee, Junaluska, North Carolina, and Affrilachian communities at Entry Mountain and Moatstown in Pendleton County, West Virginia.

=== Antebellum Era ===
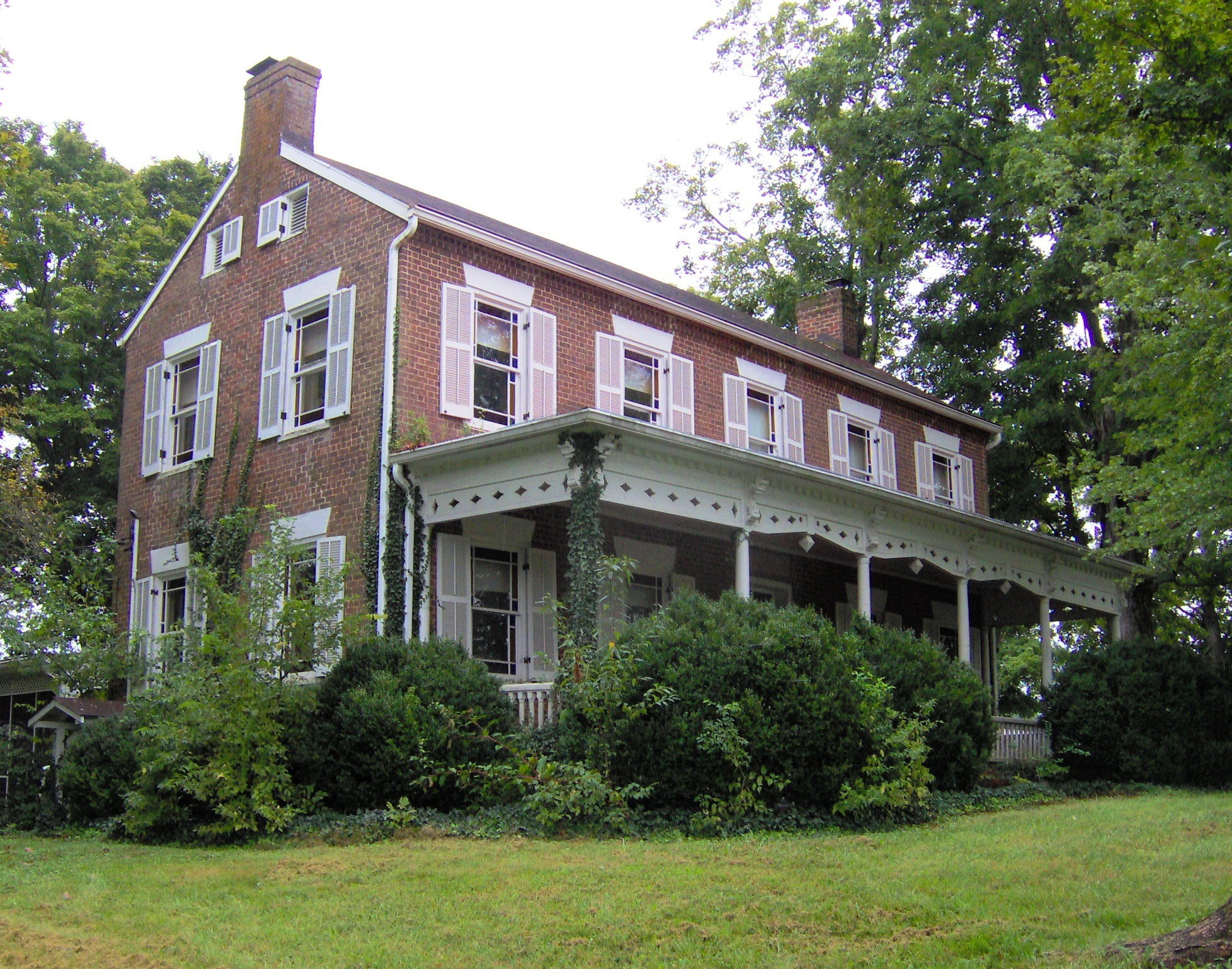
Wheatlands, a plantation in Sevier County, Tennessee

Many Affrilachians were enslaved prior to the Civil War. White Appalachians from all classes benefited from the enslavement of Affrilachians and supported the institution of slavery.

The majority of slaveholders in Southern/Central Appalachia were not plantation owners because competing in the plantation-economy with institutions outside of the mountains was not profitable. More commonly, community professionals and entrepreneurs would own a few slaves and exploit their labor for their wealthy families' chores, small-scale farms, and other habitual tasks. Large-scale plantations in Appalachia were sometimes the result of slaveholders moving their coastal estates upland for new economic opportunities; while large scale plantations were rarer in Appalachia than less mountainous regions of the South, there was generally as least one per county.

Enslaved people in Appalachia had no legal, personal, social, or economic rights. Enslaved Affrilachians could find more leniency from their lack of autonomy if they lived far from large plantations or were skilled in a particular trade; they could have more choice in their social arrangements or could work without their enslavers supervision. Unskilled enslaved Affrilachians had to do more difficult or dangerous tasks, like farming, mining, or laboring in forestry.

=== After the Civil War ===
Liberia, South Carolina was founded immediately after the Civil War as a freedom colony in Pickens County, on the border with Western North Carolina.

== Demographics ==
Map of Affrilachia by population and frequency of inclusion in cultural Appalachia: (Note: Large population is defined as over 2500 residents, medium is 500-2500, and small is less than 500. Gathered from 2000 Census data.)
Always incl., large pop.
Always incl., mid pop.
Usually incl., large pop.
Usually incl., mid & small pop.
within the ARC; not cultural Appalachia
.

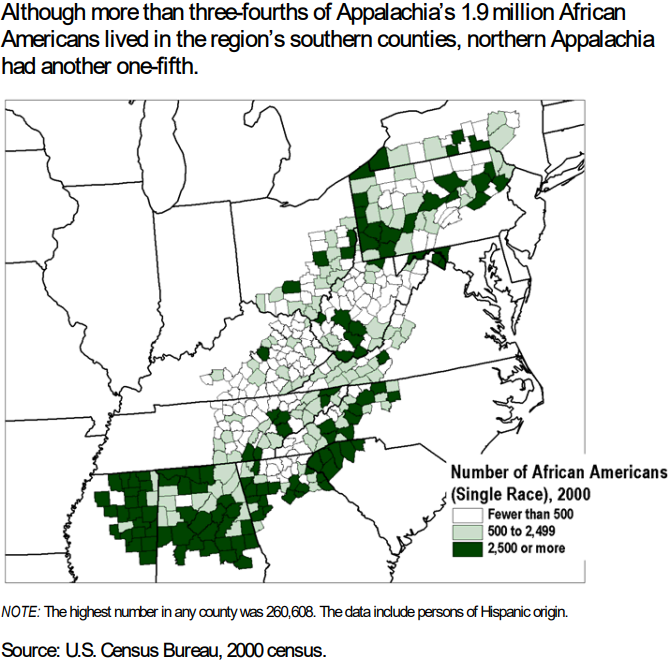
The African-American population within the entire ARC's jurisdiction. This includes the Affrilachians of central and southern Appalachia as well as other groups, such as Black Southerners.

=== Demographic history ===
In the 1790 census, Affrilachians both free and enslaved totaled approximately 6% of Appalachian population (19,000 people out of a 307,000 total). This rose by the 1860 census, which saw Affrilachians comprising 10% of the overall Appalachian population of 5.4 million residents.

In the 1990 census, Appalachia racial diversity had shrunk to pre-Civil War levels, with 7% of its population now being Affrilachian, at approximately 1.6 million people within the Appalachian Regional Commission's (ARC) jurisdiction. Also at this time, ethnic minorities constituted approximately half of new births. From 1990 to 2000, Affrilachian continued to be the largest ethnic minority within the ARC's zone. Instead of rurality, Affrilachians today are more likely to be urban residents.

=== Enslavement ===
Slavery was particularly evident in the parts of Alabama which are sometimes considered Appalachia. It was common for a given Appalachian country to have at least one site where over 20 slaves where held. However, most usually, Appalachian slaveholders owned 1-5 slaves for their households and acreage.

== Culture ==
=== Literature ===
Booker T. Washington was a prolific writer, authoring works such as The Future of the American Negro, Character Building, and The Negro in the South.

Frank X Walker wrote Isaac Murphy: I Dedicate This Ride (2010), Masked Man, Black: Pandemic and Protest Poems (2020), Black Box: Poems (2006), and Affrilachia: Poems by Frank X Walker (2000).

Crystal Wilkinson is the author of the books The Birds of Opulence (2016), Water Street (2011), Blackberries, Blackberries (2000), and Perfect Black (2021).

In 2018, Affrilachian poets celebrated 25 years since the term was created in the book, Black Bone: 25 Years of the Affrilachian Poets edited by Bianca Lynn Spriggs and Jeremy Paden, published by The University Press of Kentucky. This book had contributions from Frank X Walker himself along with other prominent members of the Affrilachian literary community.

Nikki Giovanni is another prominent Affrilachian poet from Knoxville, Tennessee.

==== Scholarship ====
Scholar Jason Hockaday noted that, when reviewing identity-centric works on Appalachian Studies, he found less usage of self-indigenizing rhetoric related to Black Appalachian people, when compared to white ones. He suggests that these works offer a method of expressing Appalachian identity while simultaneously racially dividing Appalachians and avoiding the self-indigeniazation of Affrilachians. He writes that Western Carolina University obscures Black people from its public presence, instead elevating an individual African-American woman who worked for the university.

=== Religion ===
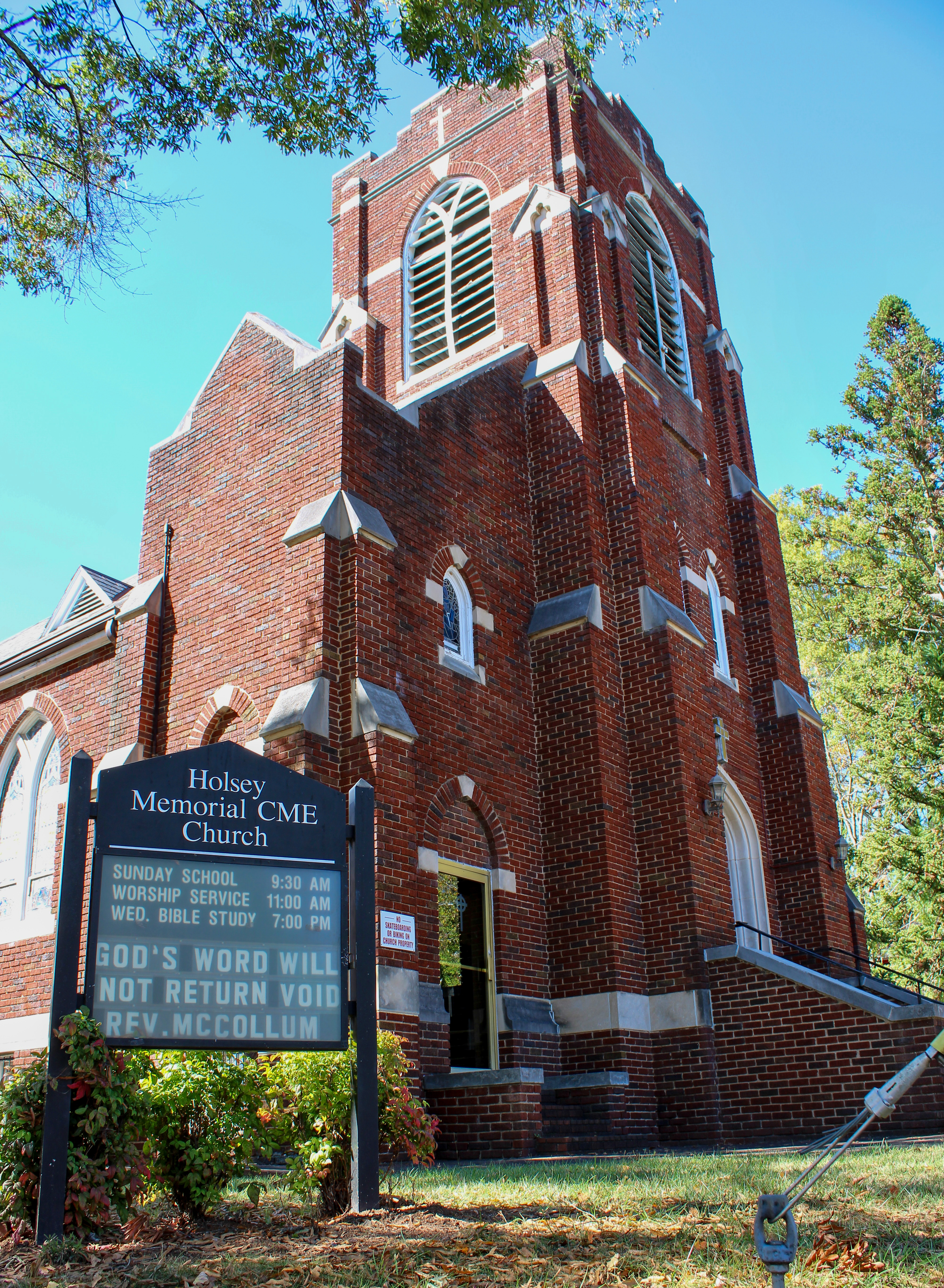
Holsey Memorial CME Church in Iredell County, NC, a congregation that is part of the Christian Methodist Episcopal Church

A number of Affrilachians belong to various Christian denominations, particularly those of the Methodist tradition (including those of the holiness movement), as well as those of the Baptist and Holiness Pentecostal faiths. Throughout the summer Methodists hold camp meetings during which the two works of grace—the new birth and entire sanctification—are preached; revival services are held throughout the year for the same purpose. Affrilachian Methodists are found in various Methodist denominations such as the African Methodist Episcopal Zion Church, Bible Methodist Connection of Churches, Christian Methodist Episcopal Church, and Free Methodist Church, among others.

==== Spirituality ====
Affrilachians have historically practiced Afro-diasporic religions, like Hoodoo, and local folk practices, like Granny magic. Ginseng, and the foraging practice of "digging seng", was popular among Affrilachians; ginseng was sold at the local market and used in Hoodoo practices.

=== Language ===
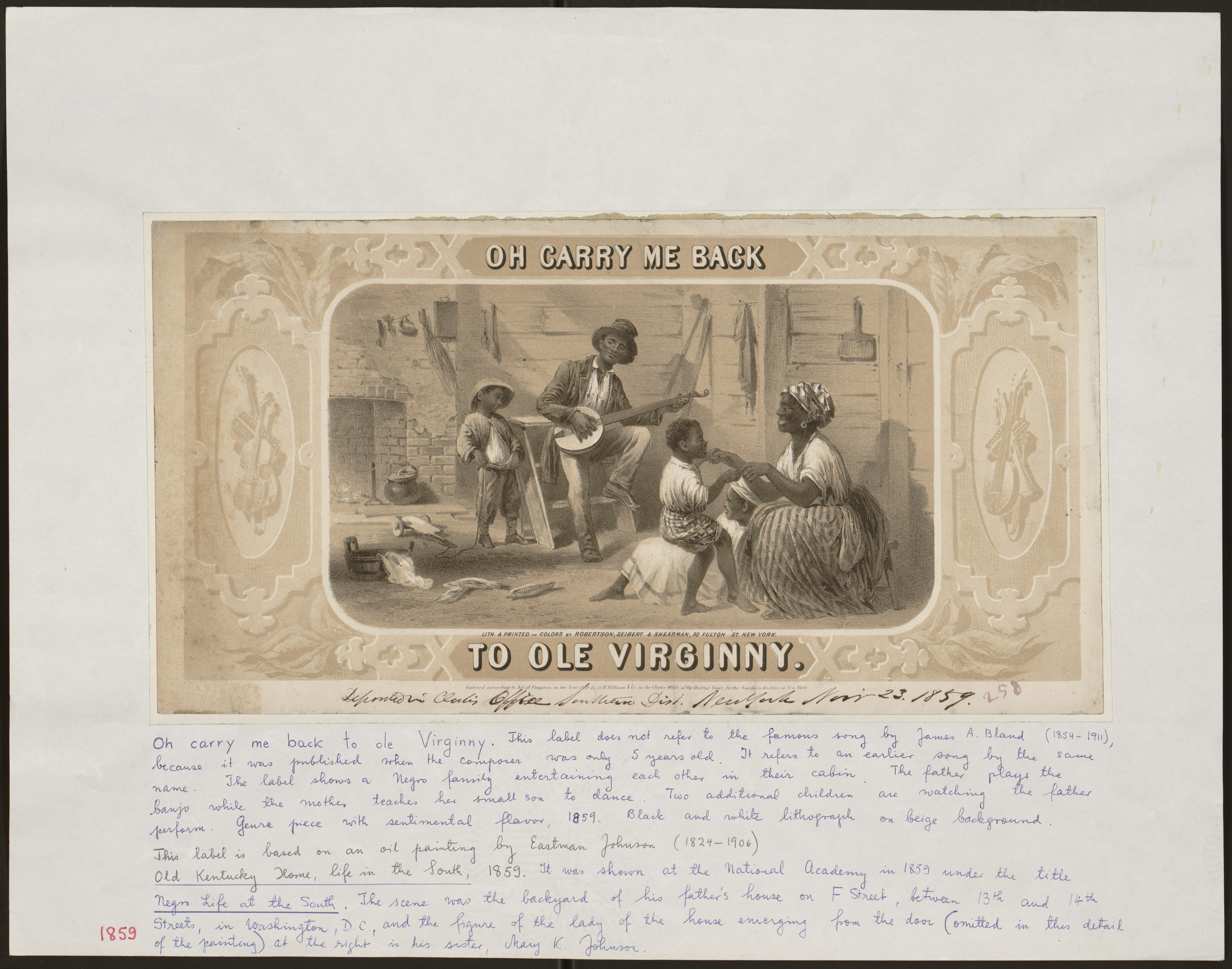
Affrilachian music and dialect

Many Affrilachians speak African-American Appalachian English (AAAE), which is often considered to be a regional variety of African American Language (AAL). In comparison to other groups speaking African-American Language, Affrilachians have been reported as increasingly adopting an Southern Appalachian or Southern dialect commonly associated with White Appalachians. AAAE is observed to evolve features and phonology independently, outside of the norm for other varieties of AAL. These similarities include an accent that is rhotic, the categorical use of the grammatical construction "he works" or "she goes" (rather than the AAVE "he work" and "she go"), and Appalachian vocabulary (such as airish for "windy"). However, even African-American English in Appalachia is diverse, with African-American women linguistically divided along sociocultural lines.

Despite its distinctiveness, AAAE shares many features with other varieties of Appalachian English, including the use of nonstandard pronunciation, grammar, and vocabulary. AAAE also shares features with other varieties of African American English, particularly those spoken in the South. For instance, a study of African American communities in the Appalachian region of Virginia found that the dialects of these communities shared many features with both African American English and Southern White English. Features of AAAE include the interchangeable usage of "was" or "were"; the attachment or absence of the third person singular "-s" for verb forms; the use of habitual "be"; and the use of completive "done", among other features.

=== Visual arts ===
Appalachia is also home to vibrant African American art communities. In 2011, artist, educator, and curator Marie Cochran started the western North Carolina–based Affrilachian Artist Project to combat the common perception of Appalachia as a racially homogeneous, white region. She co-curated the Affrilachian Artist Project's inaugural exhibition at the August Wilson Cultural Center in Pittsburgh, Pennsylvania. A traveling version of the exhibit, which includes work by LaKeisha Blount, Victoria Casey-McDonald, and Rahkie Mateen, has been hosted by galleries throughout Appalachia.

=== Music ===
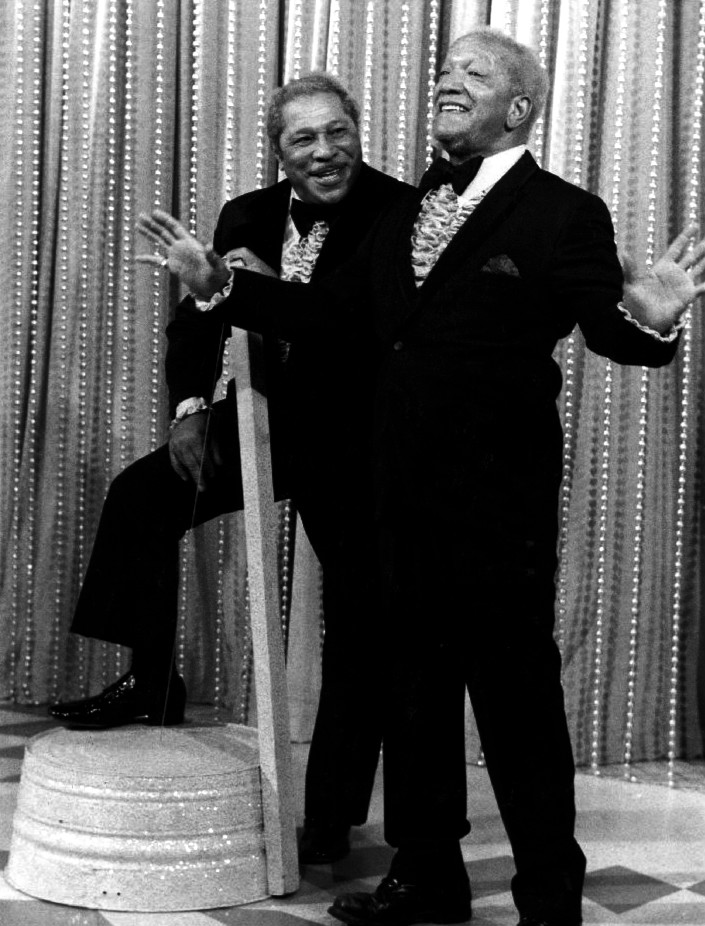
Affrilachian musical instruments, from Top left to right: the Banjo, the Washtub bass or Gutbucket, and the Washboard.

==== History ====
African Americans, including those who identify as Affrilachian, have had a significant impact on the sound of Appalachian music over the years. The start of African American influence on Appalachian music began when individuals were forcefully brought from West Africa to the United States put into slavery. Along with West African enslaved musicians came various stringed instruments made from gourds, such as the ngoni, that would later become the banjo, an instrument that is common in Appalachian music. Often associated with Appalachian and Old-Time music, other iconic instruments with origin in the Black and Affrilachian community include the washboard and the washtub bass.

African Americans continued to influence Appalachian music on plantations, where work songs and spirituals were frequently sung, and into the 19th and early 20th centuries. By this time, string music began to be associated with minstrelsy and black-face performances, so African American musicians distanced themselves from it. Some modern string bands, however, such as the now-disbanded Carolina Chocolate Drops, have worked to reclaim Appalachian music for the Affrilachian community. With members including Rhiannon Giddens and Dom Flemons, the Carolina Chocolate Drops won a Grammy for Best Traditional Folk Album in 2011.

==== The banjo ====
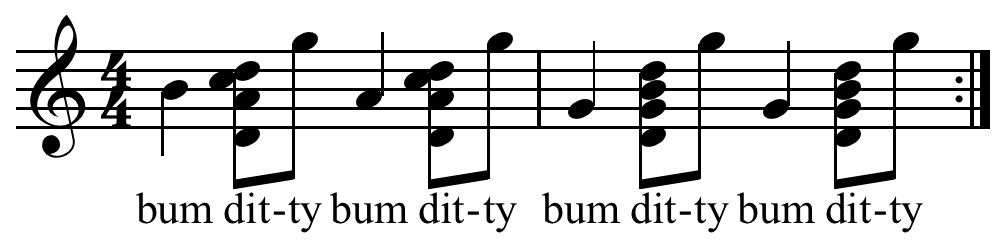
Clawhammer bum-ditty

The banjo is fundamental to Affrilachian music and culture, being used in a variety of secular and religious music genres. The banjo has its origins in Africa, the name coming possibly from a corruption of Mandinka banjul, Kimbundu mbanza, or Spanish bandore. The enslaved West African musicians played stringed instruments using a unique picking technique called "clawhammer", which has become a popular banjo style in the Appalachian region, as well as important in Old-time music. Fusional instruments of the banjo with others instruments also exist, including: the ganjo, the banjolele, the dulcijo, the banjolin, the banjocello, and the banjeaurine.

==== Affrilachian fiddling ====
Affrilachians developed their own style of fiddling, dating back to at least the seventeenth century, which many of its features European-derived, African-derived, or local innovations. Uniquely Affrilachian fiddling and performance is built upon many techniques, including off-beat phrasing, "bended" notes, and greater emphasis on percussion, among other features.

==== Affrilachian jazz ====
Affrilachian jazz is a sub-genre of Jazz. Affrilachian jazz is not one unified body, but several distinct styles; styles include one based in Knoxville and Chattanooga, and another centered around Asheville into Winston-Salem.

==== Affrilachian blues ====
Affrilachian blues is a sub-genre of the Blues. Affirlachian blues has four major styles: Vaudaville, boogie-woogie (piano), dance (string-band), and down-home (guitar and harmonica). Due to their melancholy lyricism and fusion with traditional mountain ballads, Affrialchian blues have also been called "ballad-blues".

Stick McGhee was an Affrilachian blues musician from Knoxville. Other Affrilachian blues artists include John Jackson, Bill Williams, J.C. Burris, Brownie McGhee, Archie Edwards, Carl Martin, Lesley Riddle, Etta Baker, brothers Marvin and Turner Foddrell, John Tinsley, and Estil C. Ball. Some Affrilachian blues musician overlap with Piedmont blues musicians from the neighboring region. Likewise, some artists who lived bordering or outside of Appalachia have been cited as Appalachian, Piedmont, and/or Country blues artists. These include Pink Anderson, Reverend Gary Davis, Ted Bogan, Peg Leg Sam, Josh White, Charles Henry "Baby" Tate.

The blues and its Affrilachian musicians were precursors of and contributors to the creation of Bluegrass.

=== Cuisine ===
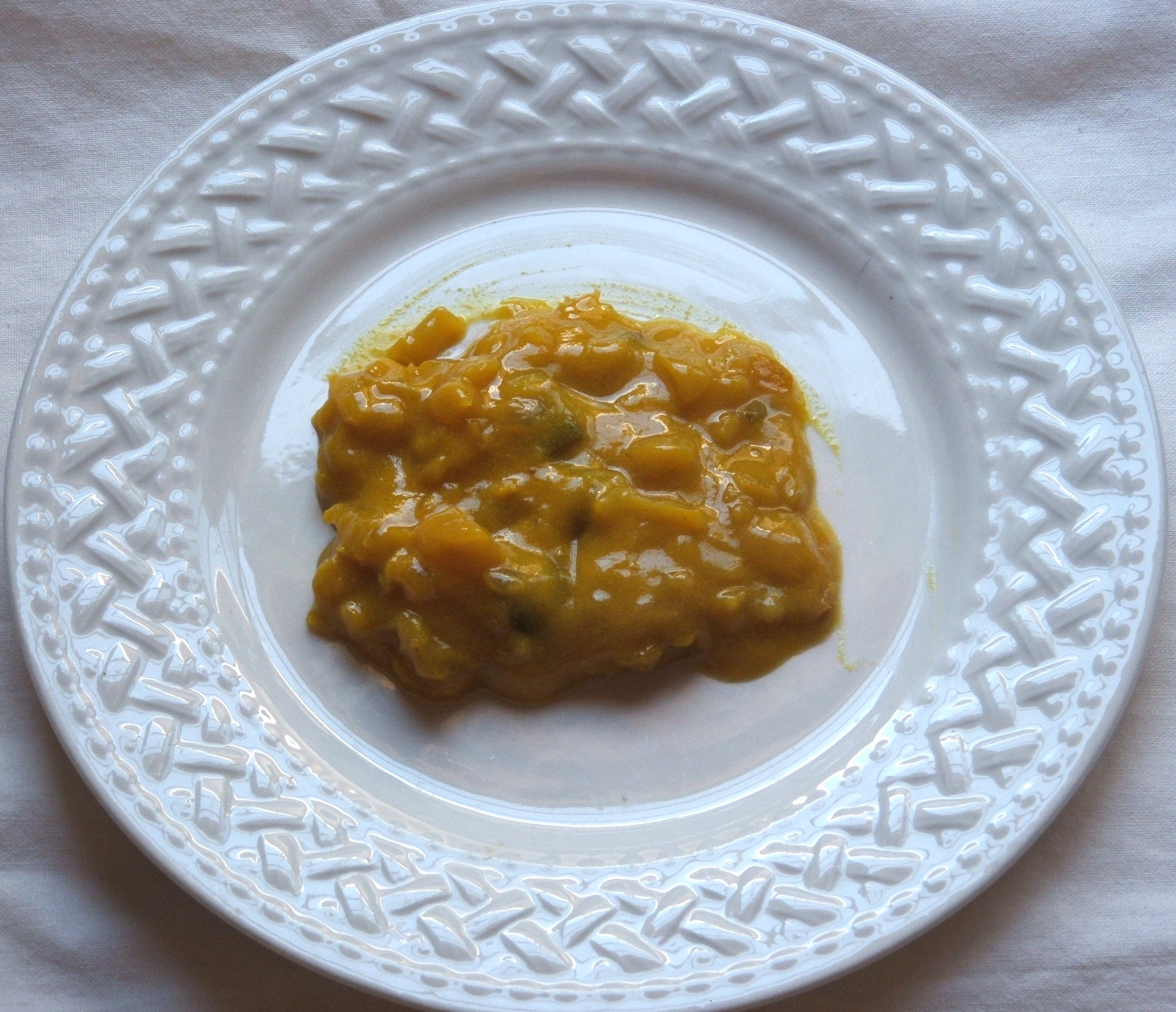
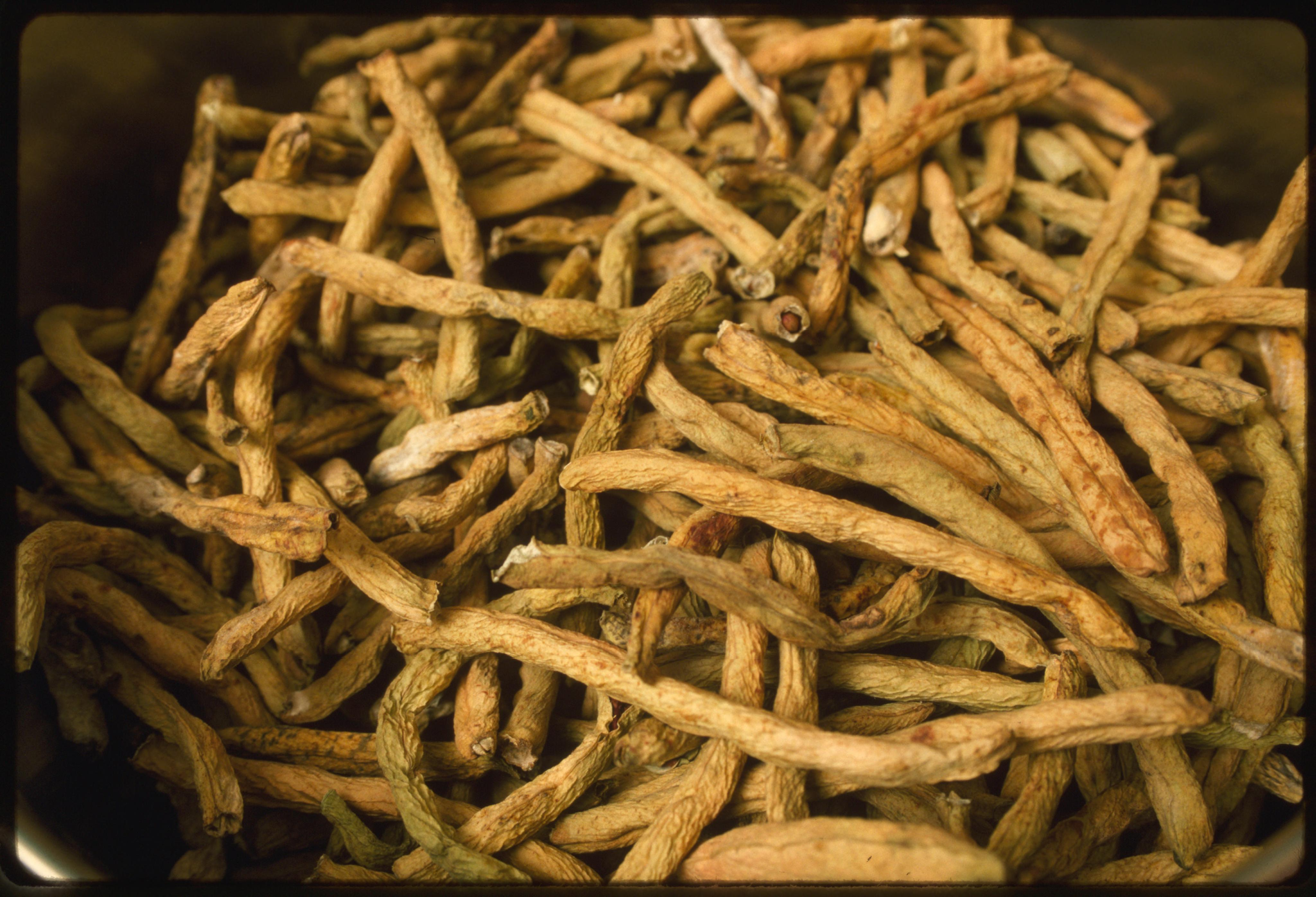
Affrilachian cuisine, from Top left to right: Chow-chow, Okra, Leather Breeches, Sweet Potato, Black Eye Peas, and stewed Collards.

Affrilachian cuisine has slight variations from region to region, just like the rest of Appalachian culture. Some of the staples across Affrilachian cuisine are the practices of preserving produce through pickling, fermenting, and canning as well as drying out other crops such as beans and corn. Much of the food that is eaten in the various Appalachian regions has historically included the crops that families could grow themselves or trade for at local markets. Another Affrilachian staple is the style of pan-frying many different dishes using butter as opposed to neutral oils—a technique also common in French and Creole cooking. Rufus Estes has differentiated his fried chicken from many others using the "pan-fried in butter" method.

Molasses and sorghum are frequently used in baking and as sweeteners. Vegetables such as okra, kale, collard greens, sweet potatoes, vegetable oysters, and cabbage are prevalent in Affrilachian cooking as are a variety of beans grown in the region. Cornbread is a common side dish. Fruit cobblers and sweet potato pies are popular desserts.

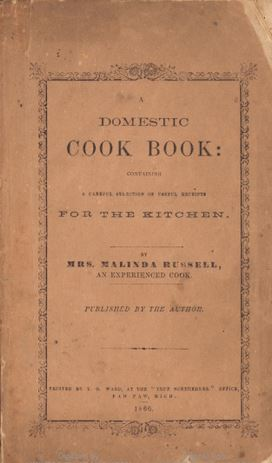
Malinda Russell's Cookbook

Malinda Russell has been called an influential member of Affrilachia because of the cookbook The Domestic Cookbook: Containing a Careful Selection of Useful Receipts for the Kitchen that she published and her "Washington Cake" that gained fame from its combination of citrus and spiced flavors. Russell was born and raised in East Tennessee. Russell's cookbook includes many forms of pickles (chow chow), jellies, tarts, puddings, condiments, and sauces (tomato catsup, clarified sugar, green tomato preserves). She writes about seafood and meat dishes like catfish, fried oysters, chicken salad, pressed beef, forced streak, pickled roast pig and meat pies (mutton chop, chicken, mince, turkey pot). Rice is used in fried rice cake, rice batter cakes, rice pudding, rice milk, burst-up rice, and rice omelet, among others. Breads (soft ginger bread, sally lun, boiled trifle, fried rusk, Indian meal batter bread, jambles) and cakes (white mountain cake, gold cake, flannel cake, sweet tea cake) are also recorded.

Russel's cookbook also includes instructions for non-food items, such as hygienic materials or magical workings. These include: magnetic oil, black ointment, hair oil, magic oil, cologne, elixir paregoric.

== Affrilachian Artist Project ==
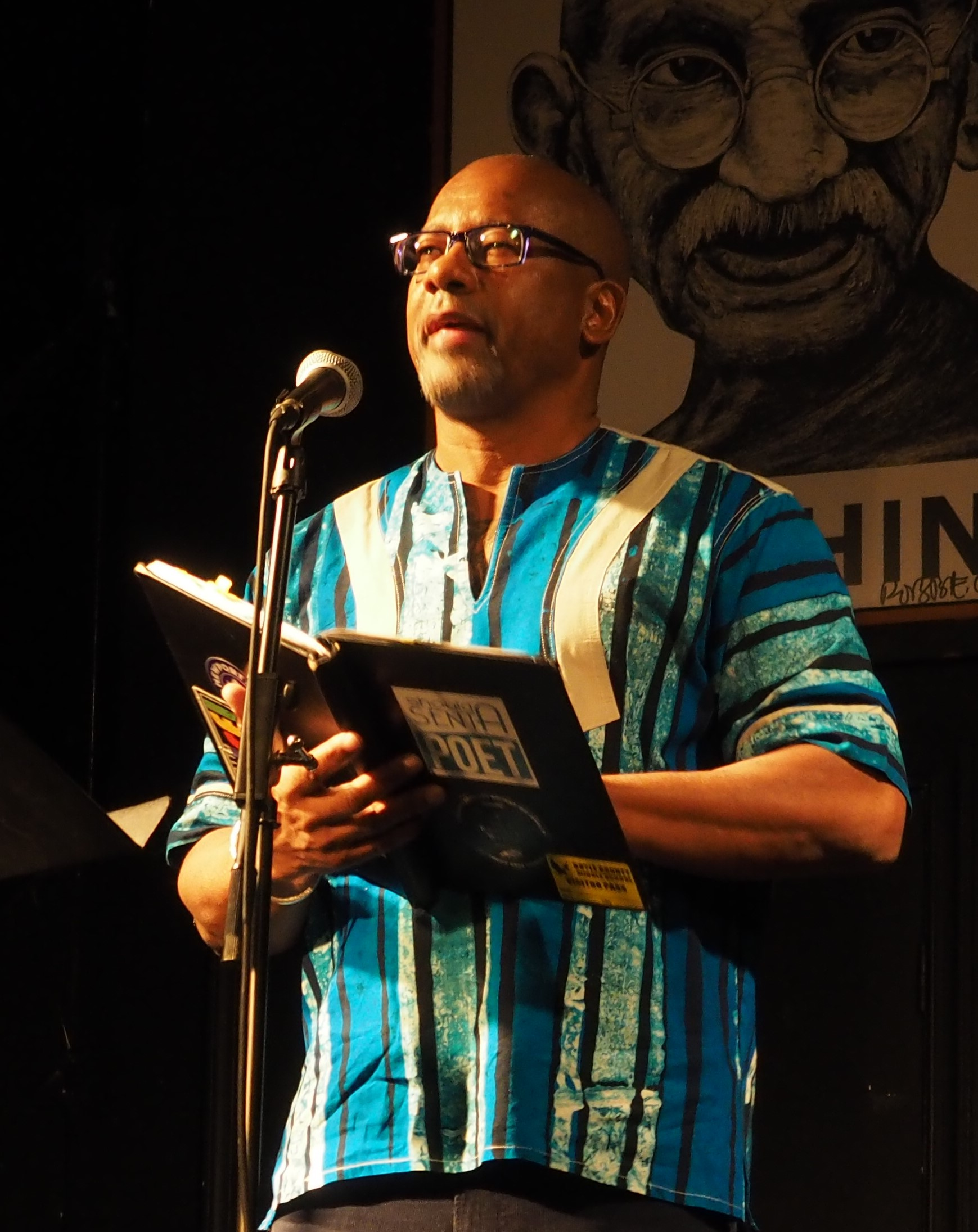
Frank X Walker

Frank X Walker co-founded the Affrilachian Poets, and in 2009 created The Affrilachian Journal of Arts and Culture. He is a graduate of the University of Kentucky, currently serving as an associate professor in the UK Department of English. His partnership with the University of Kentucky allowed him to create and teach an educational program on African-American and Africana studies, which further contributed to and raised awareness of Affrilachian art, culture, and history. Affrilachia is also the title of Walker's 2000 book of poetry, published by Old Cove Press.

In 2011, Marie T. Cochran created the Affrilachian Artist Project with the goal of building a sustainable collaborative network among the region's artists and community organizers. Today, the project has over 2,000 members and has organized several Affrilachian-themed art exhibitions.

The Appalachian region has more than thirty prominent art community members who identify with the term Affrilachian, including writers, musicians, and artists such as Frank X Walker, Nikky Finney, Kelly Norman Ellis, Mitchell L. H. Douglas, Crystal Wilkinson, Parneshia Jones, Ricardo Nazario y Colón, Ellen Hagan, and Keith S. Wilson.

As of March 2022, 3,400 people followed the Affrilachian Artist Project's Facebook page.

== Gallery ==
=== Lifestyle ===
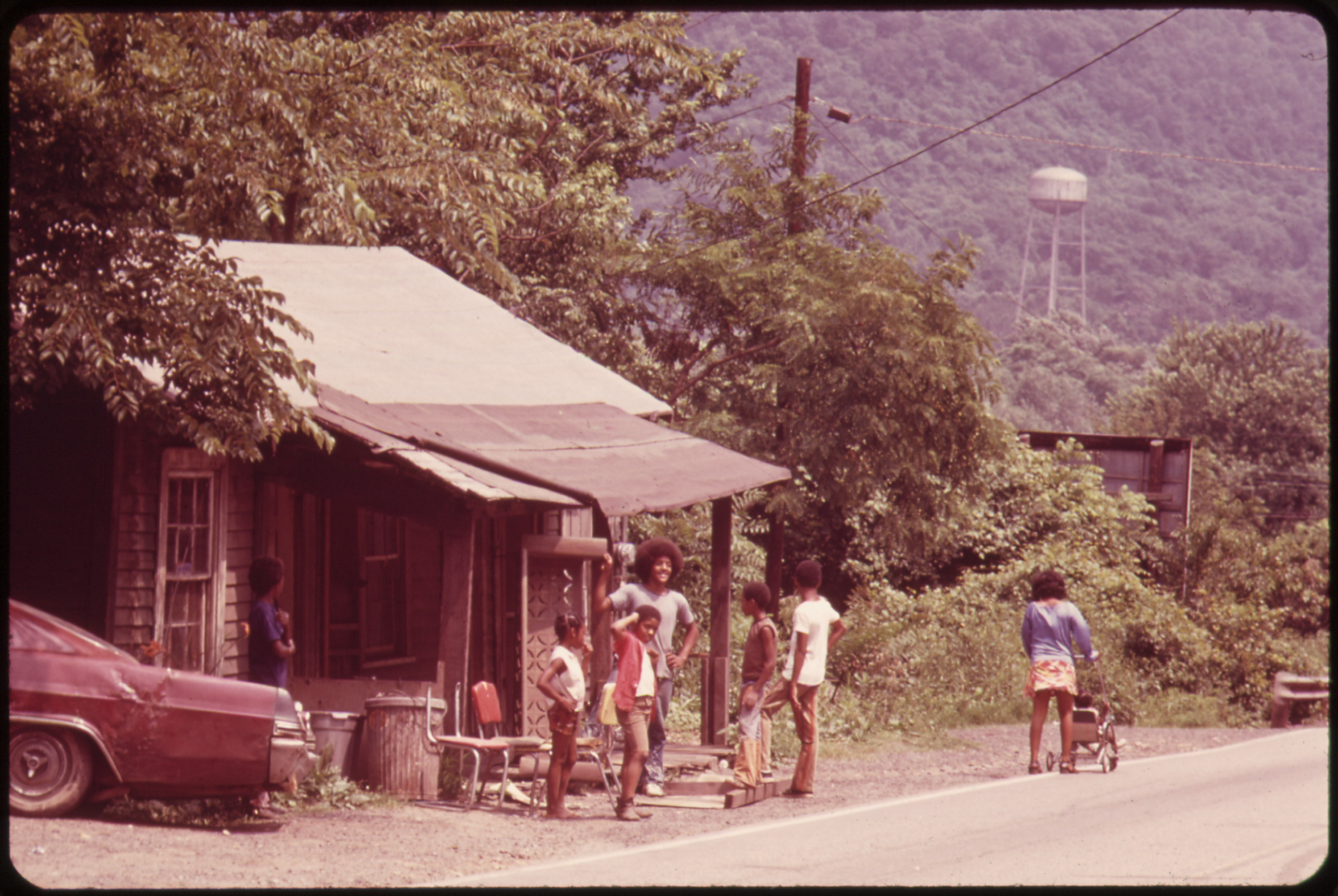
Affrilachian community in the Kanawha valley region

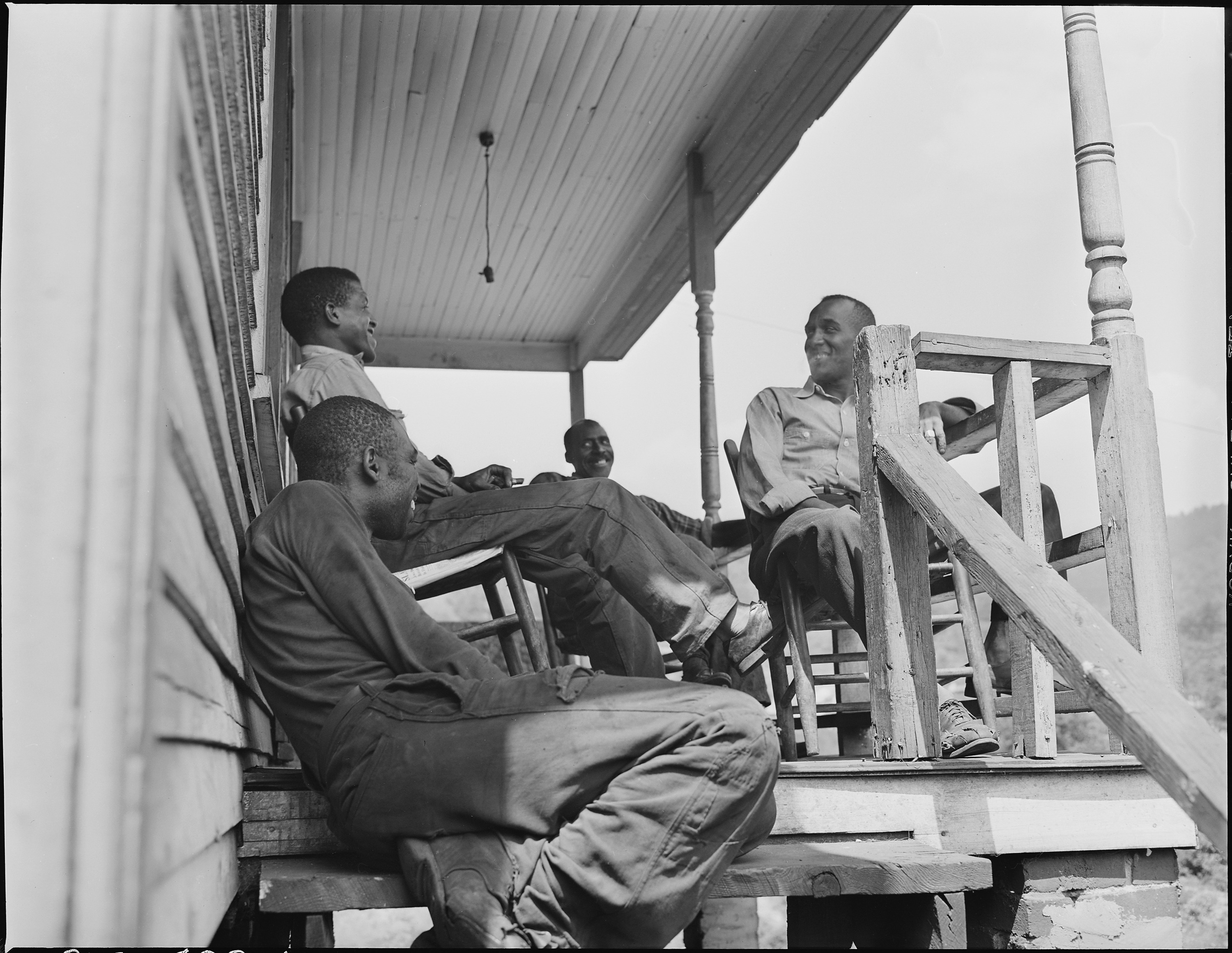
Affrilachian men, West Virginia

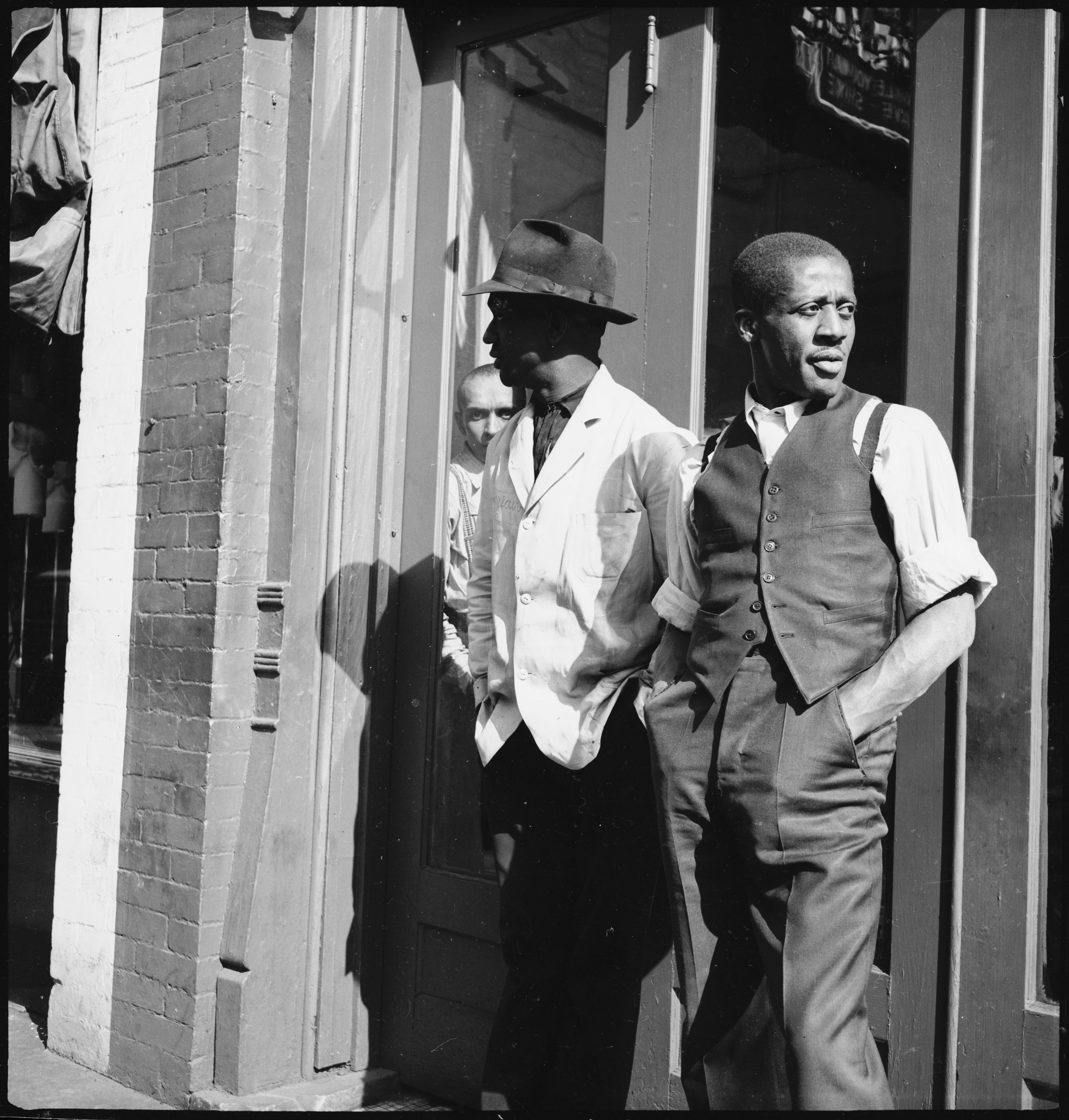
Affrilachian men, Knoxville, Tennessee

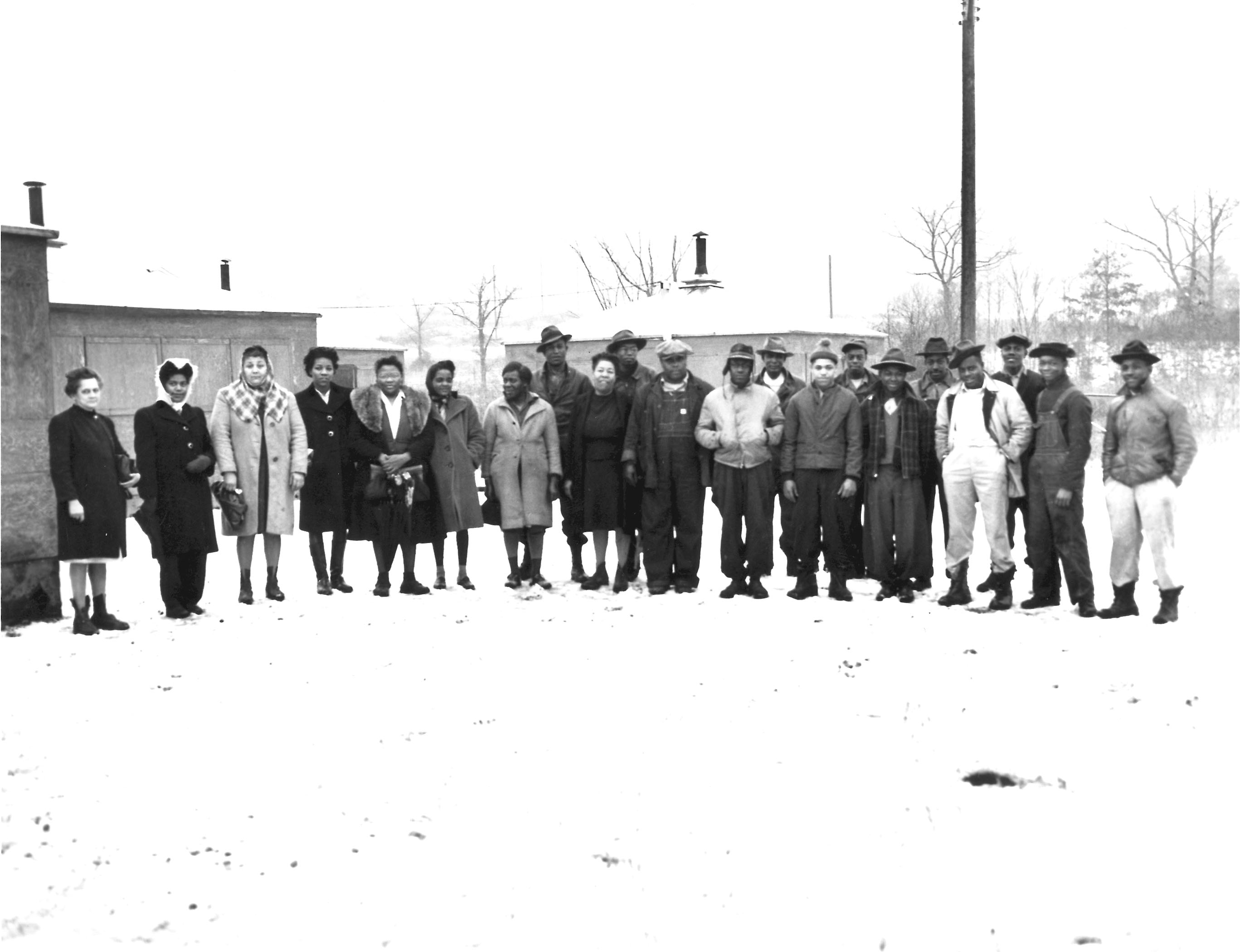
Affrilachian Winter

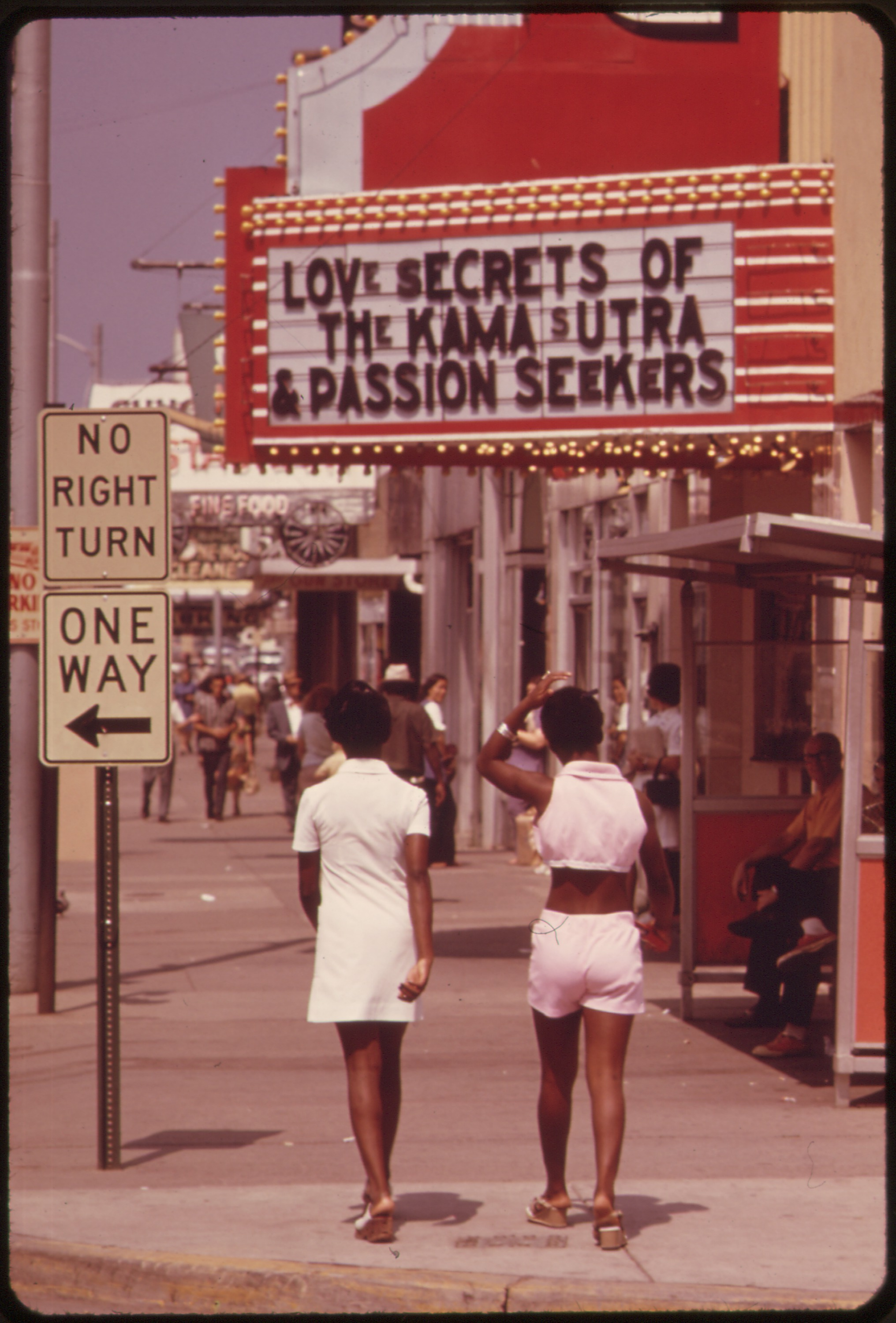
Walking in Charleston, WV

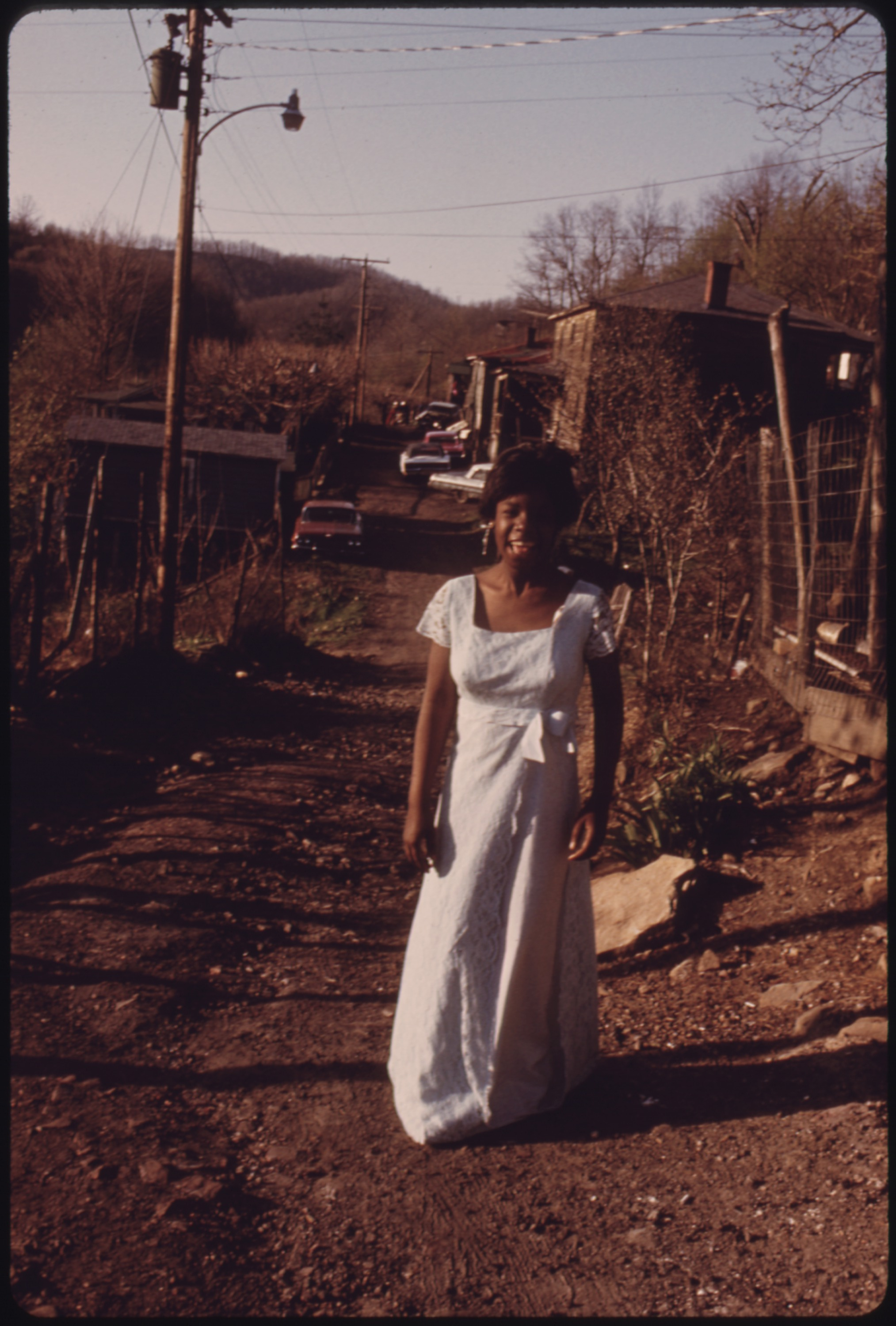
Woman near Beckley, West Virginia

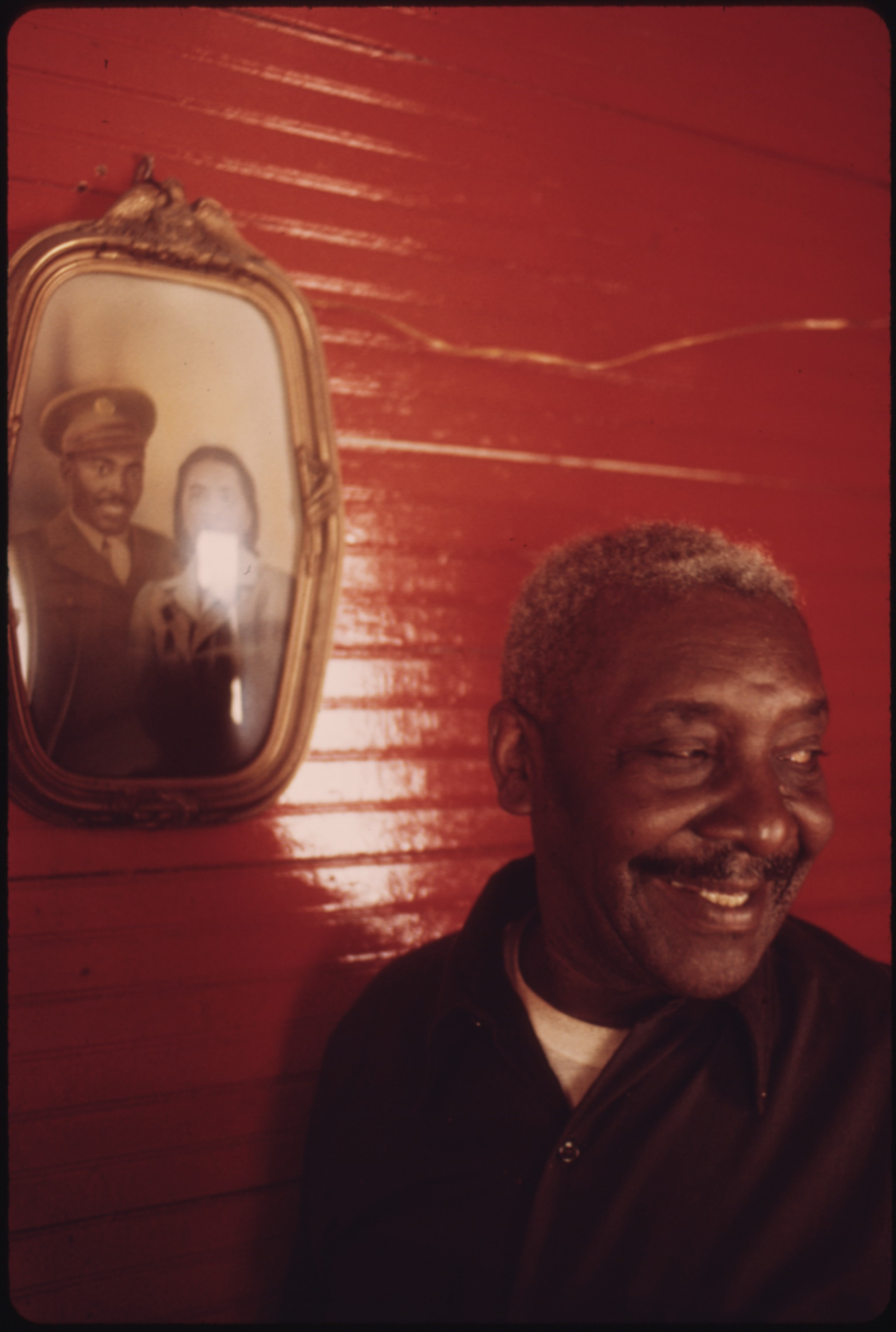
Man near Beckley, West Virginia

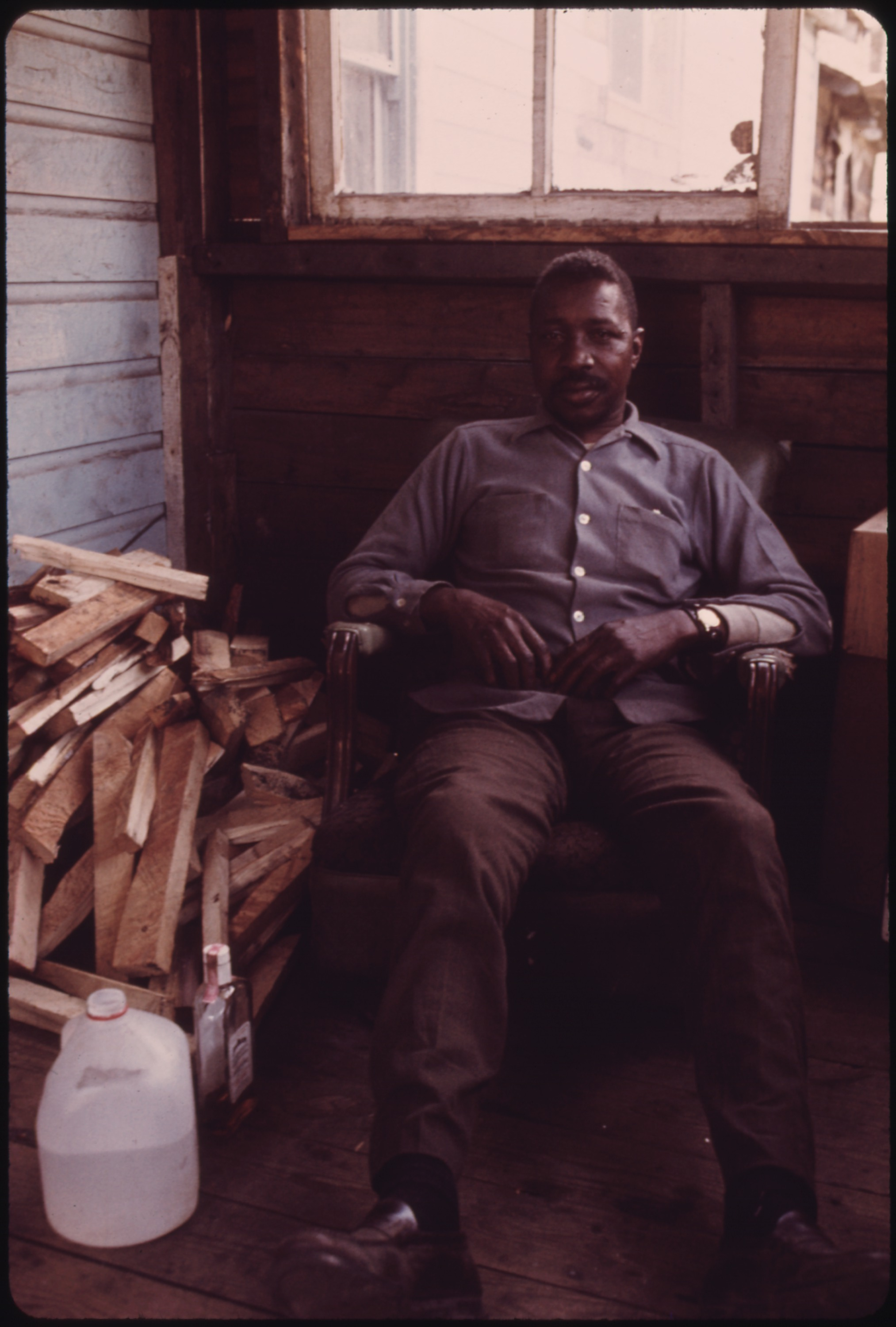
Man near Rodell, West Virginia

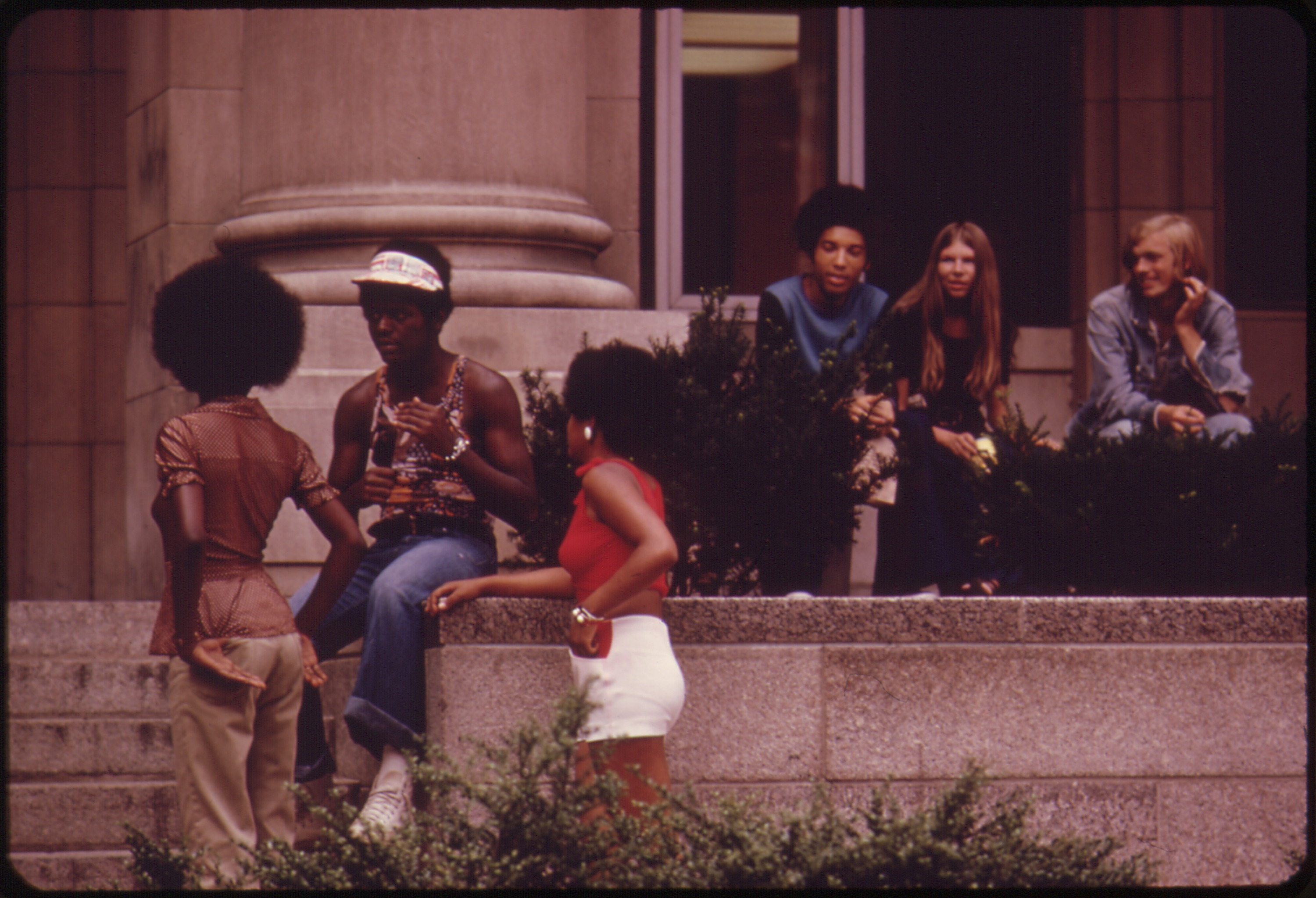
At the public library, Charleston, West Virginia

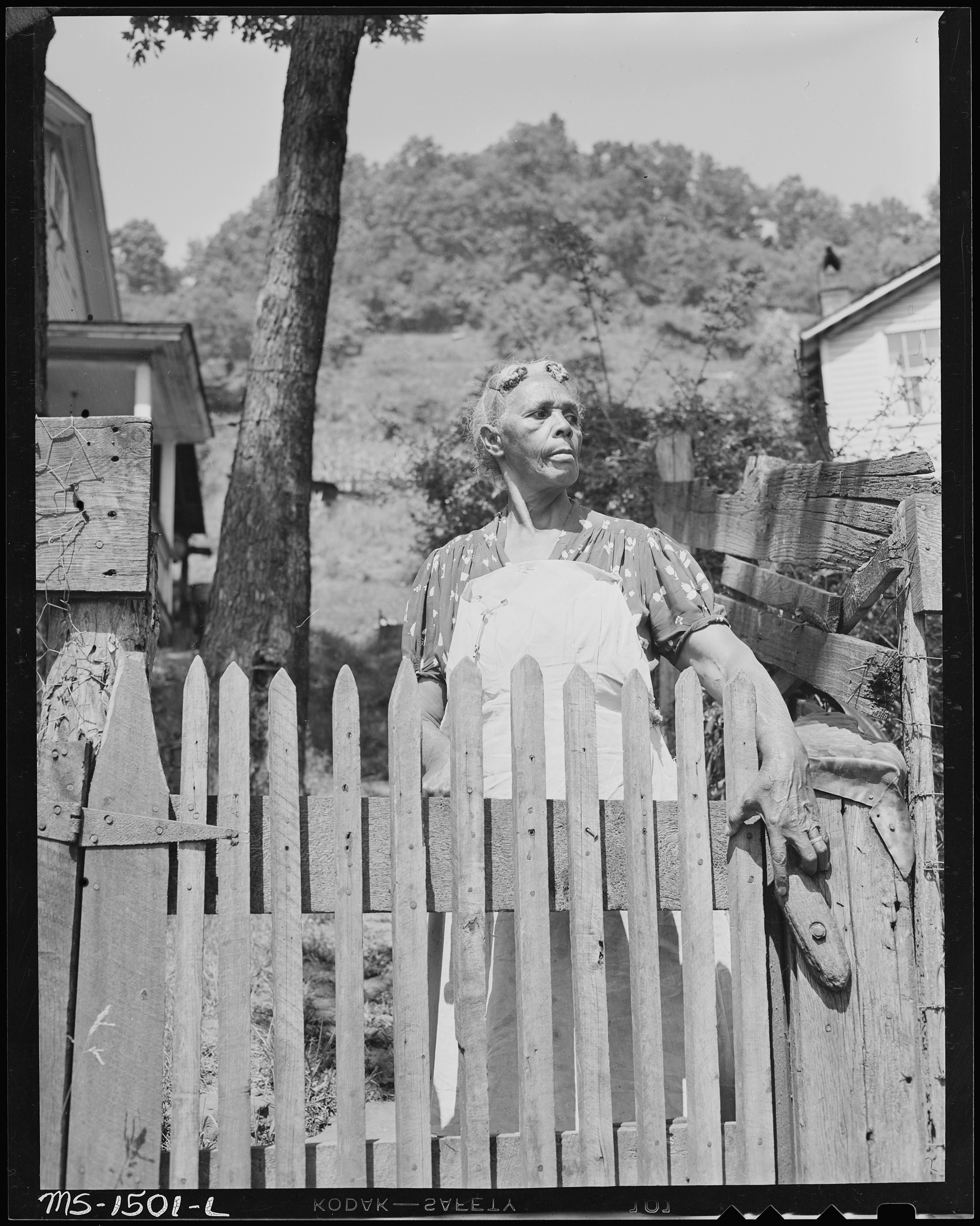
Affrilachian widow

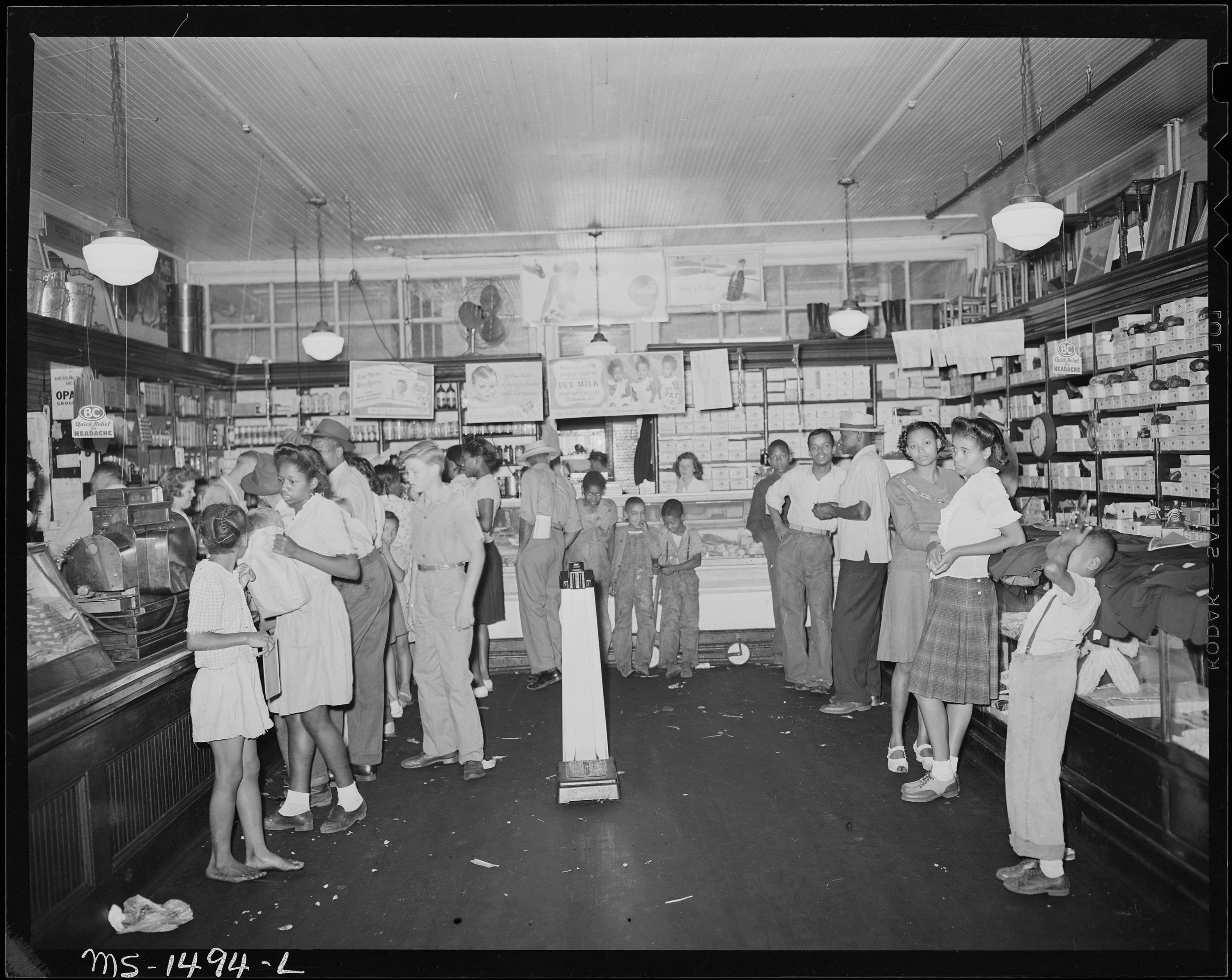
Affrilachian company store

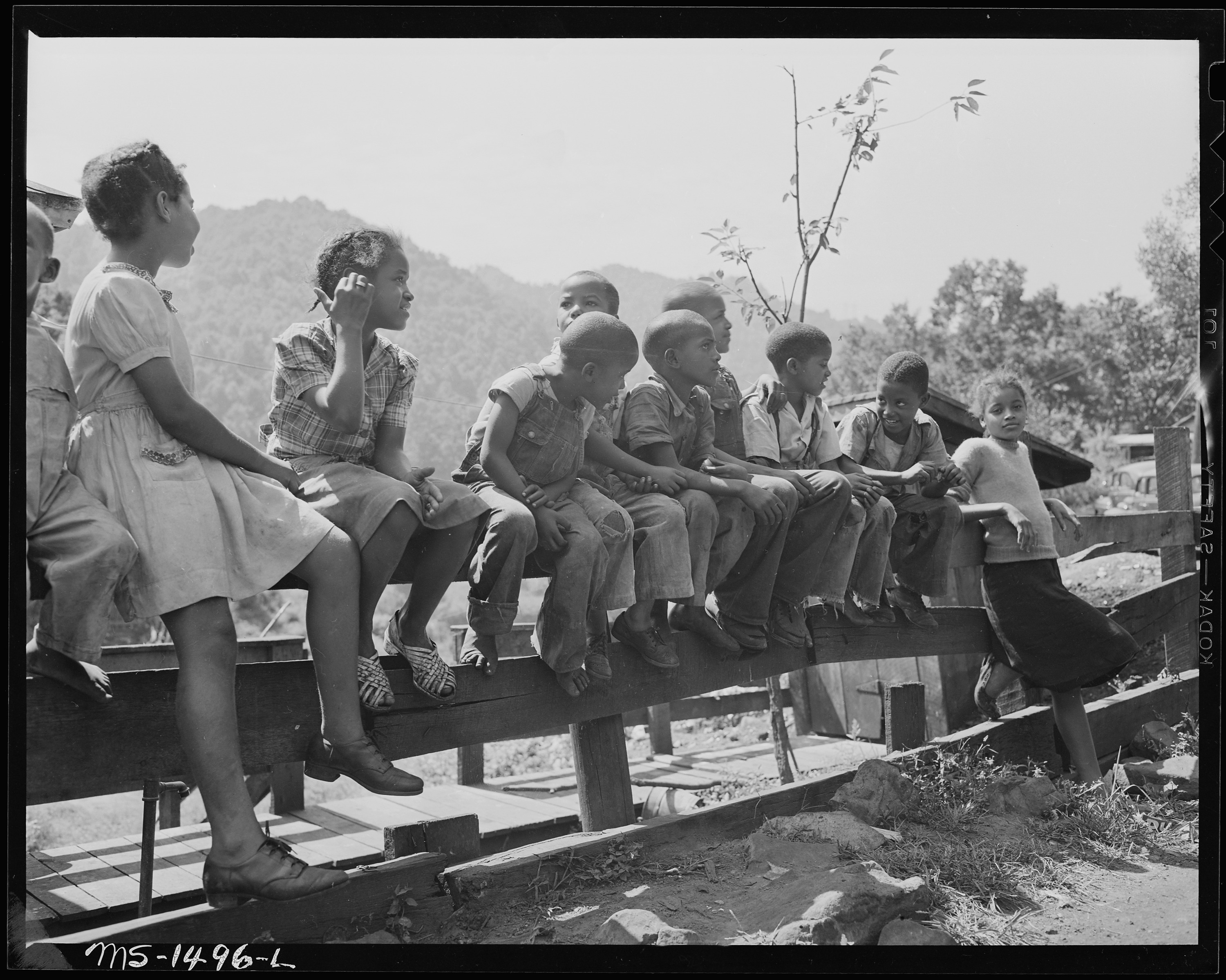
Affrilachian children of miners

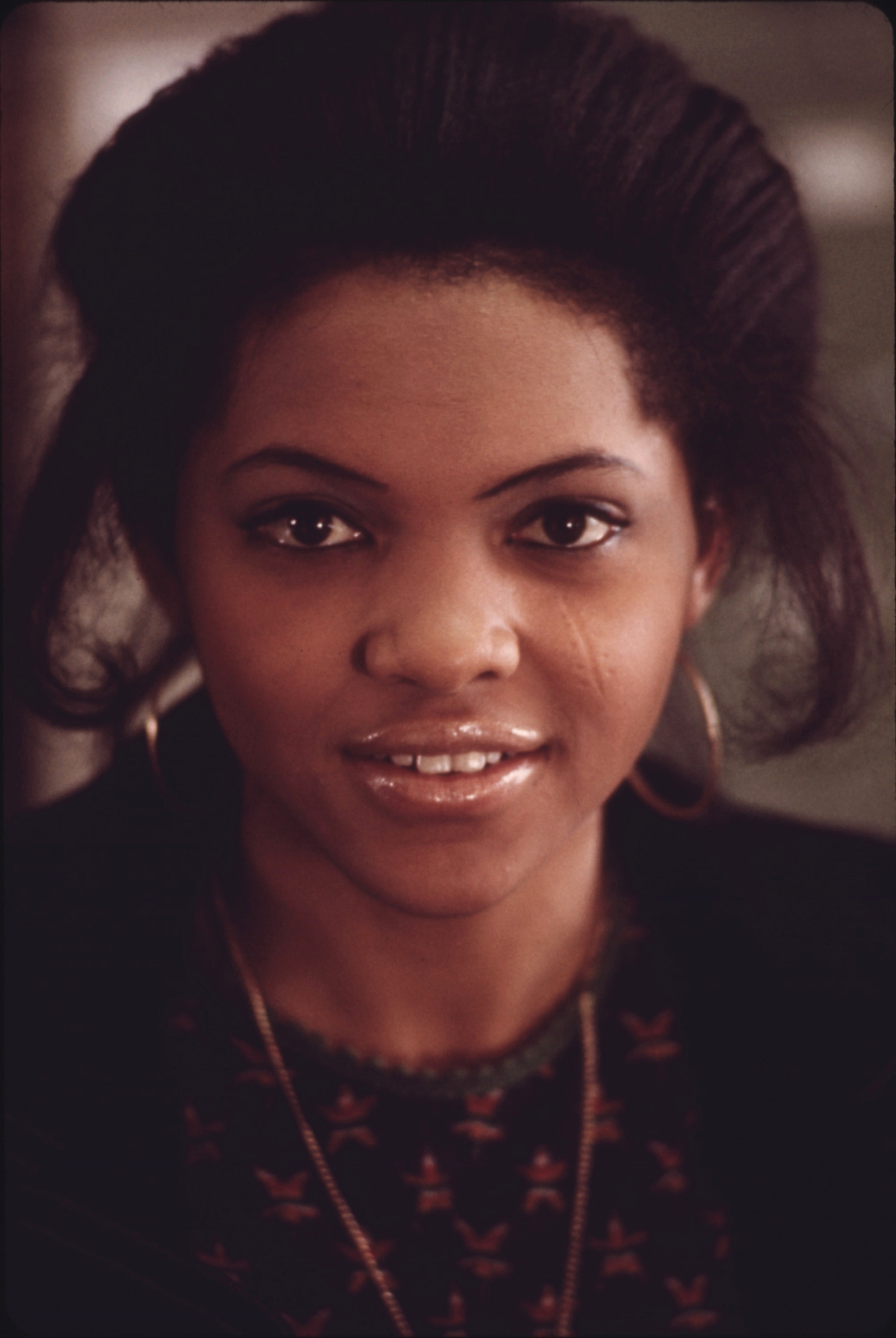
Woman (Clarice Brown) near Charleston, West Virginia

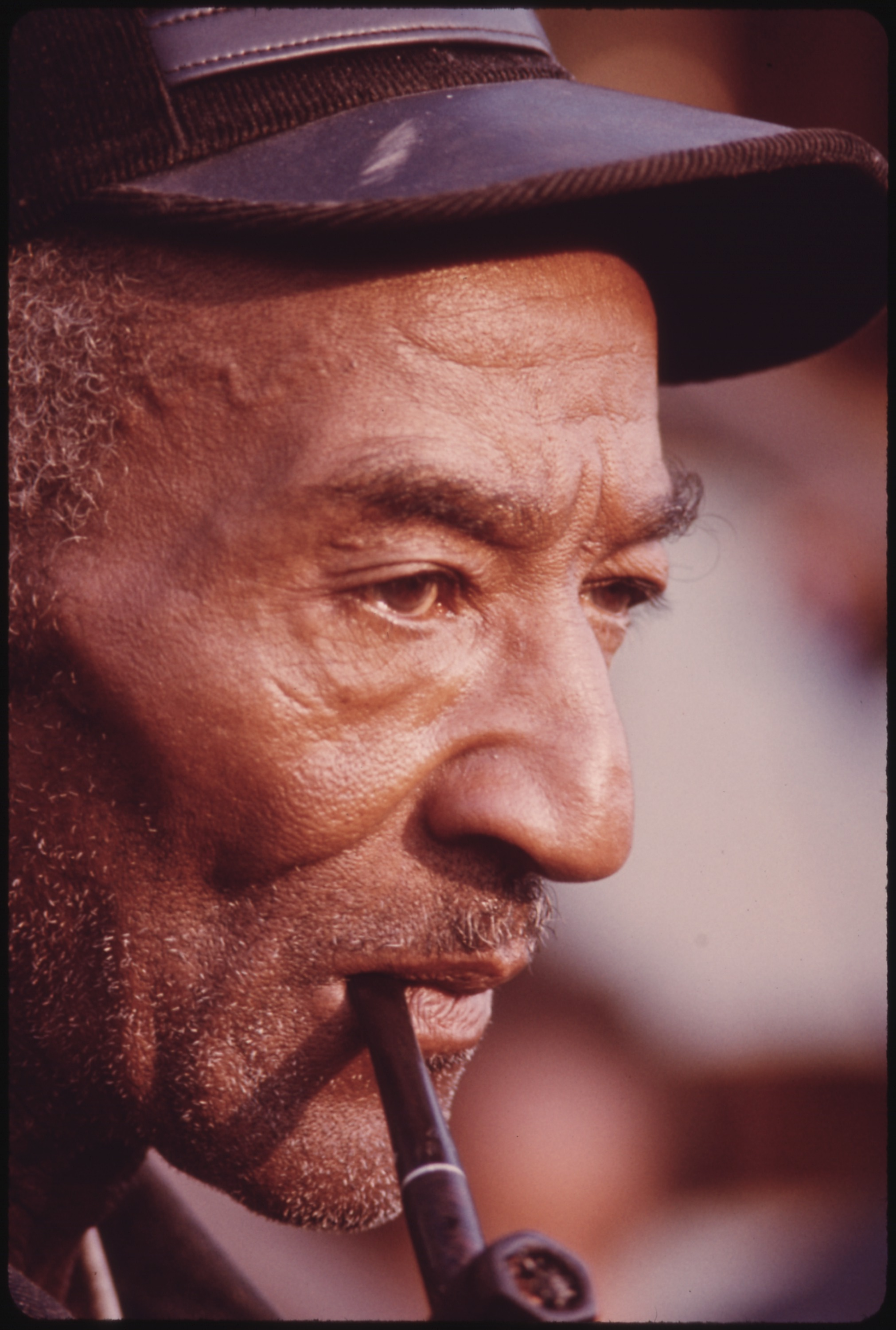
Man (Edward Austin) in Raleigh Co., West Virginia

=== Work and occupation ===
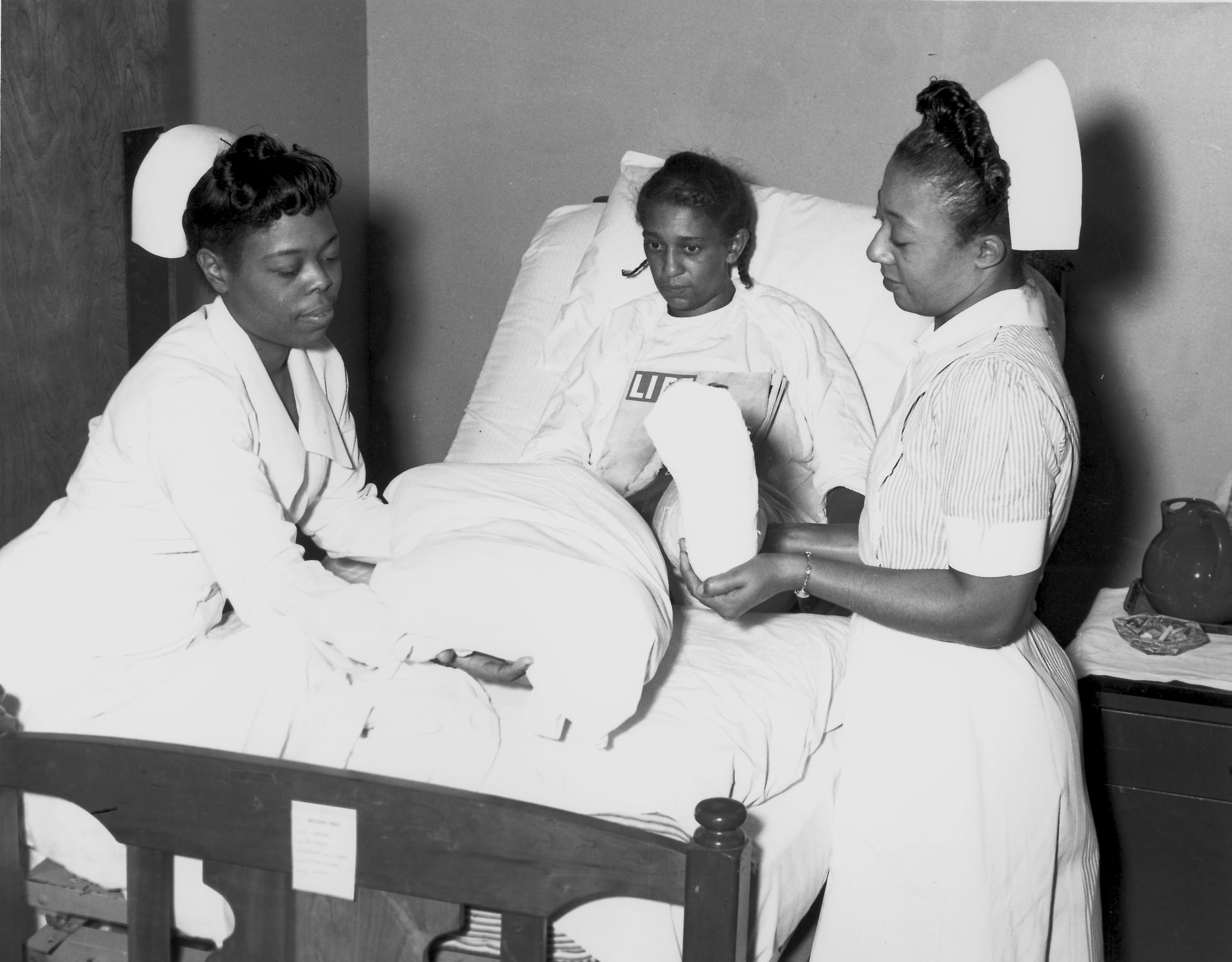
Nurses

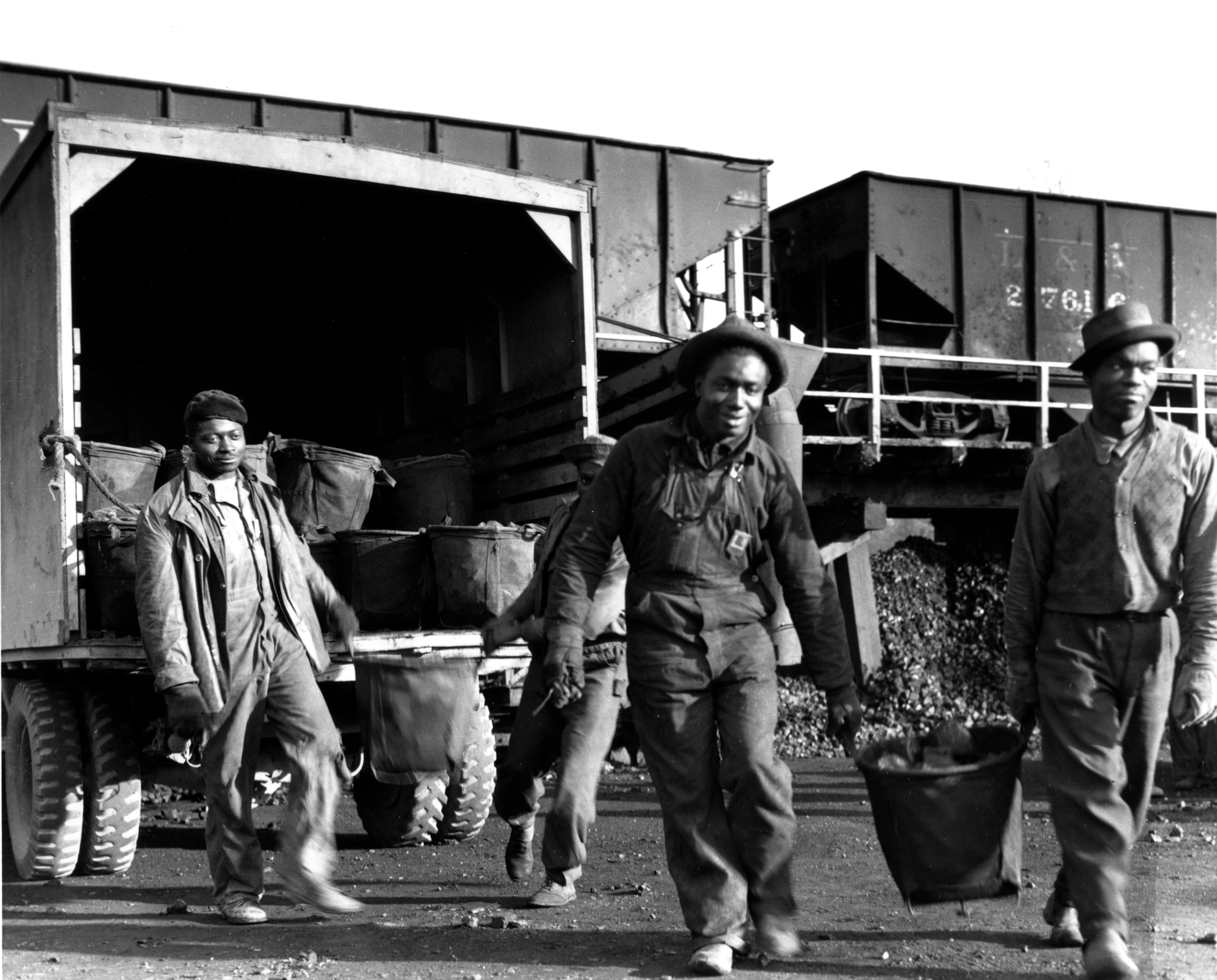
Miners working

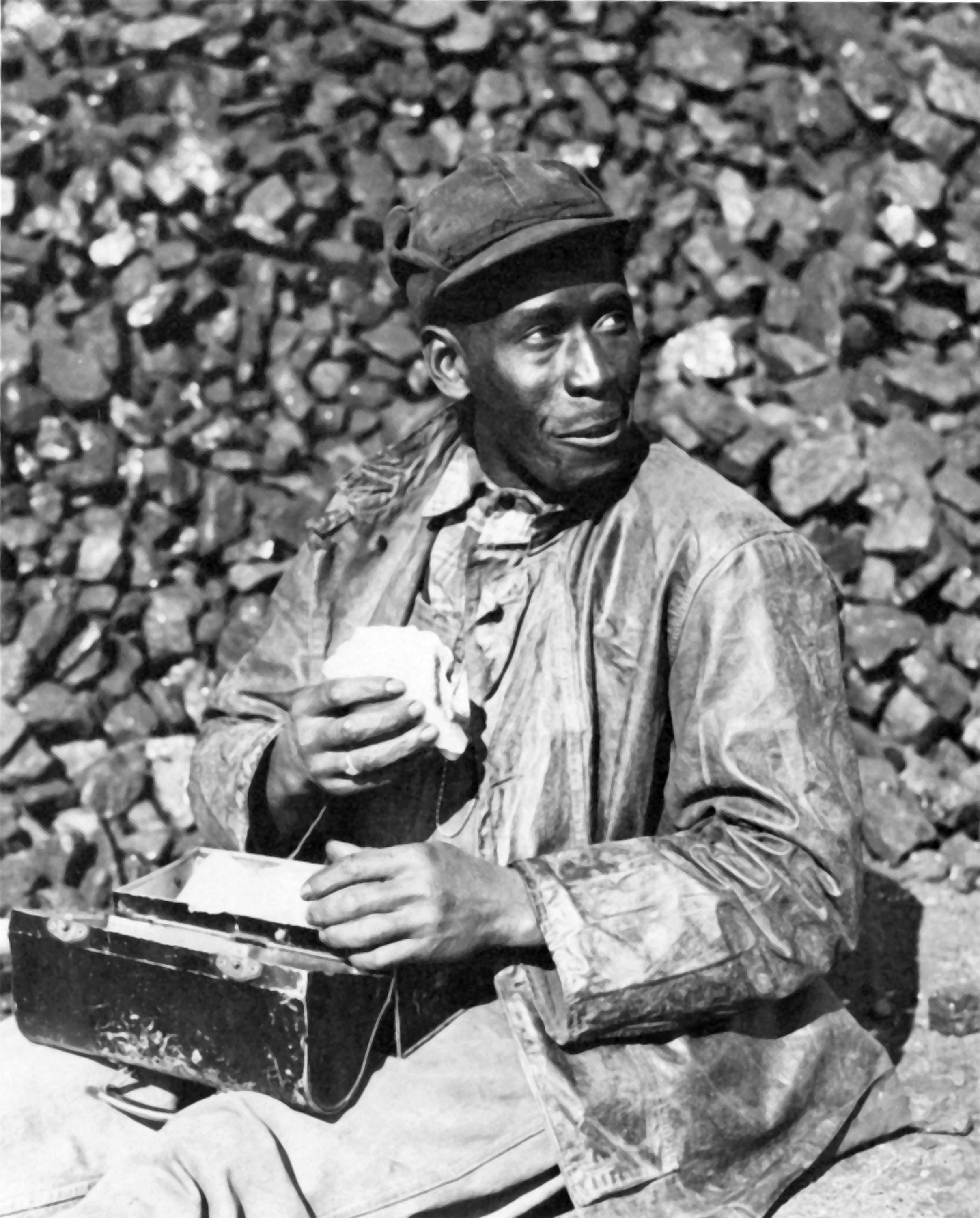
Worker eating

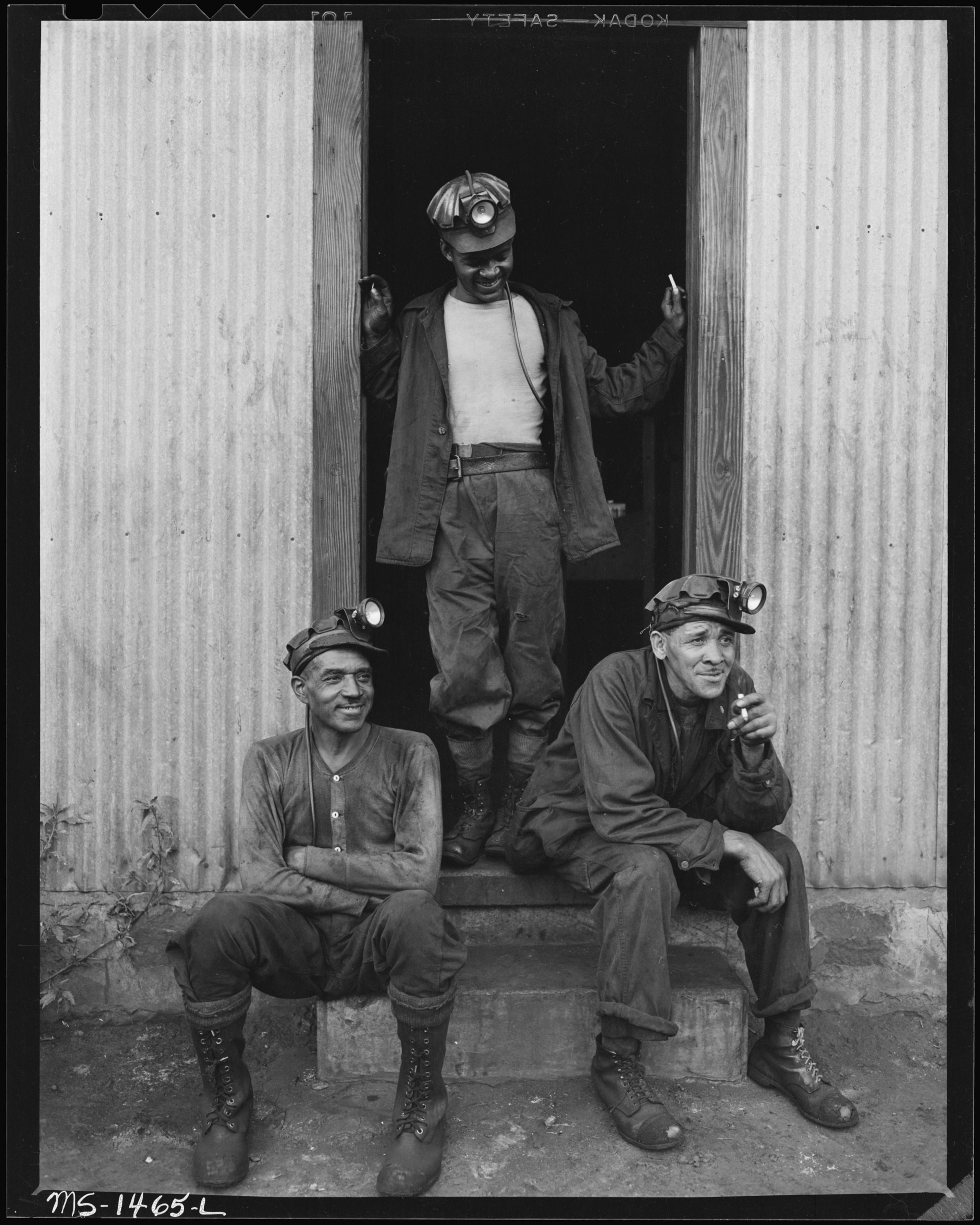
Miners in West Virginia

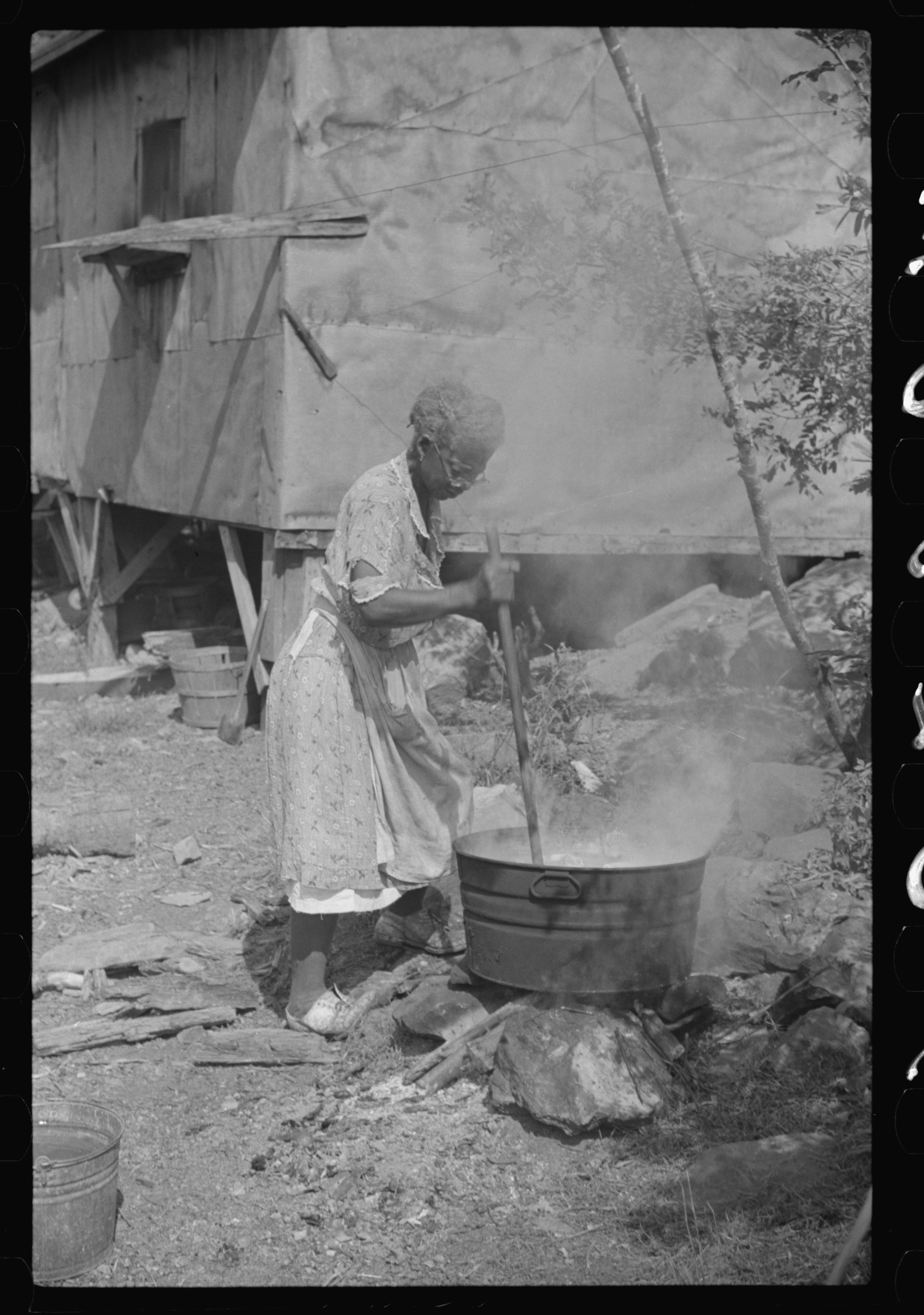
Affrilachian woman washing clothes

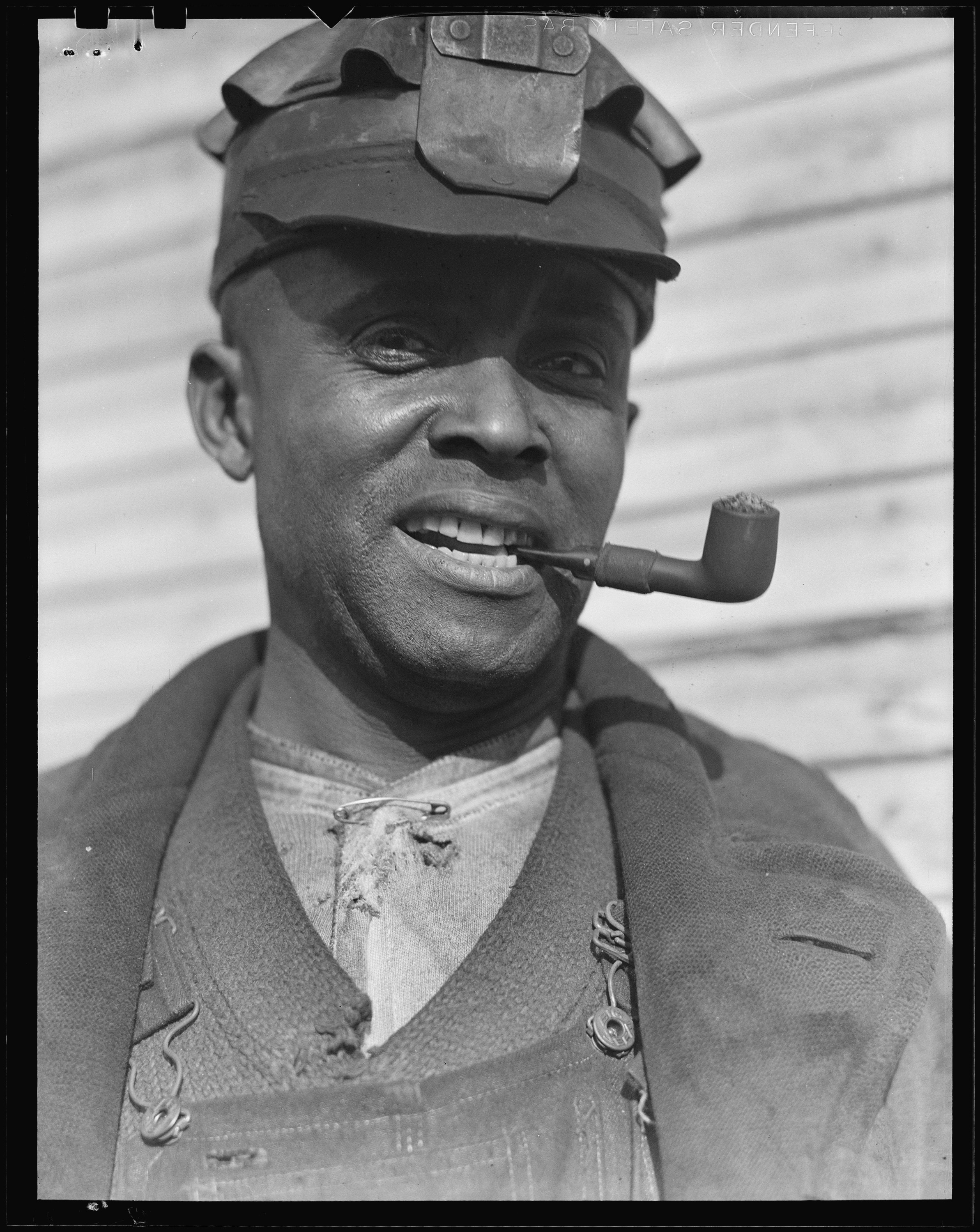
Affrilachian miner

=== Culture ===
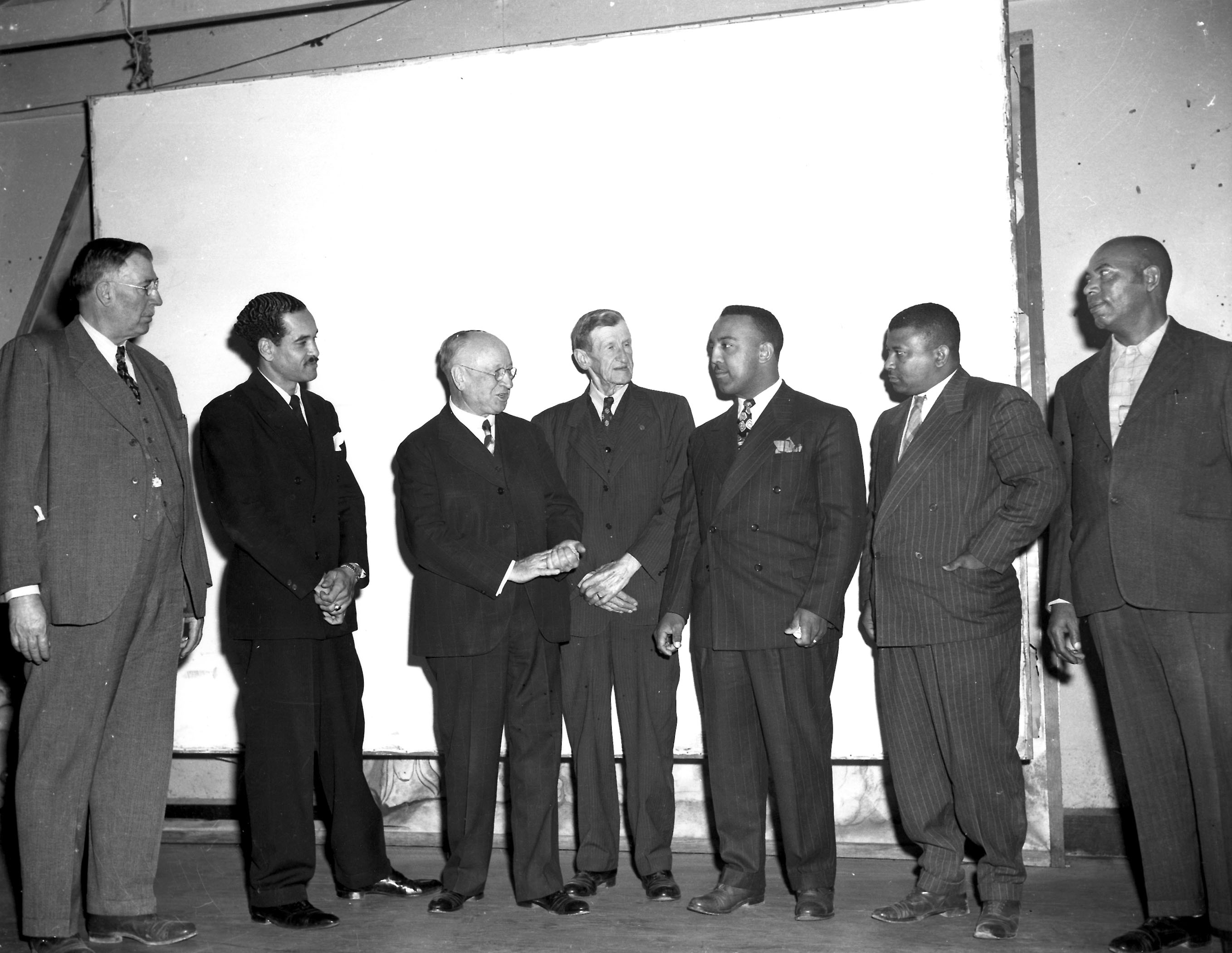
Affrilachian leaders, Oak Ridge

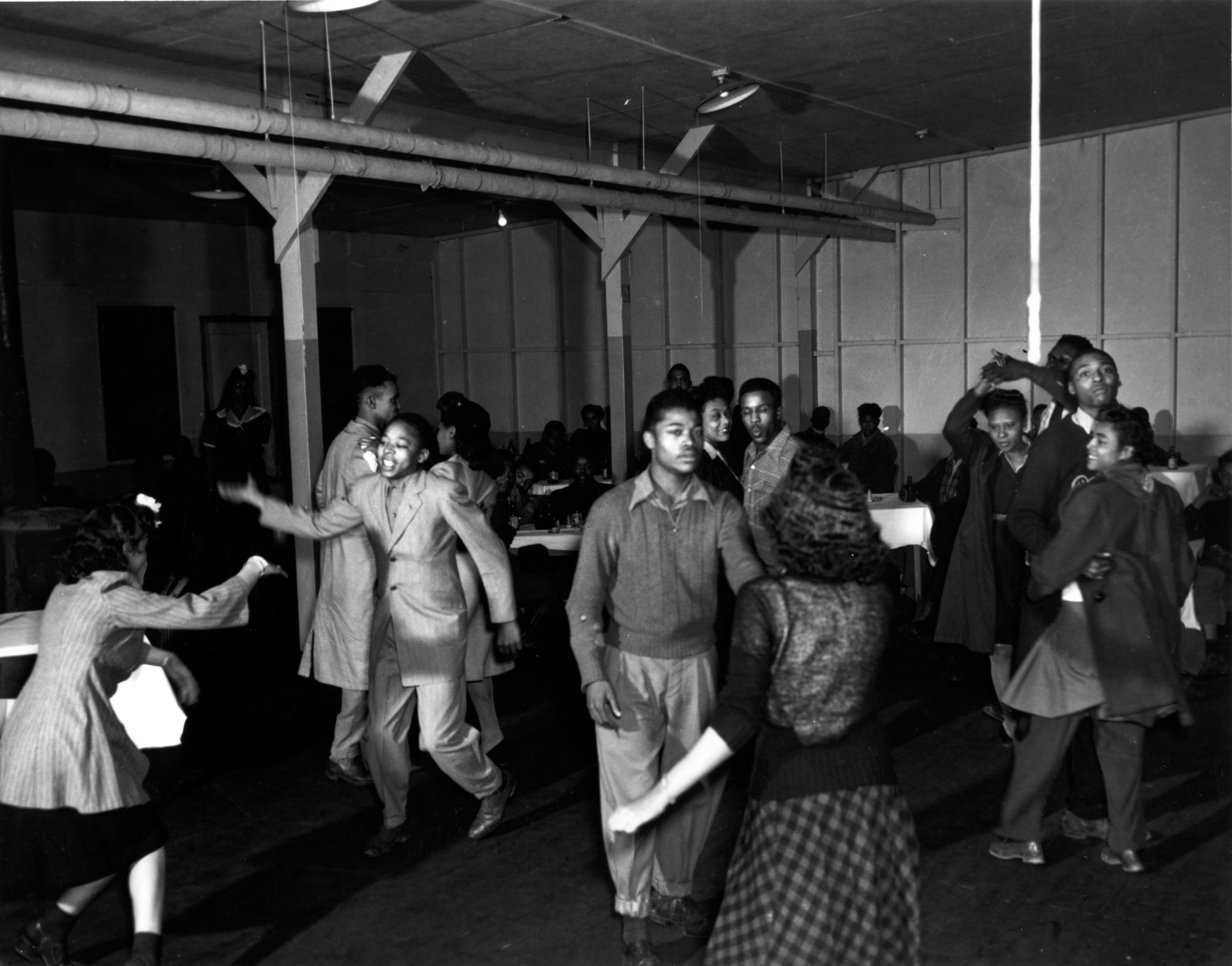
Leisure and dance, Oak Ridge

The Oak Ridge Bombers

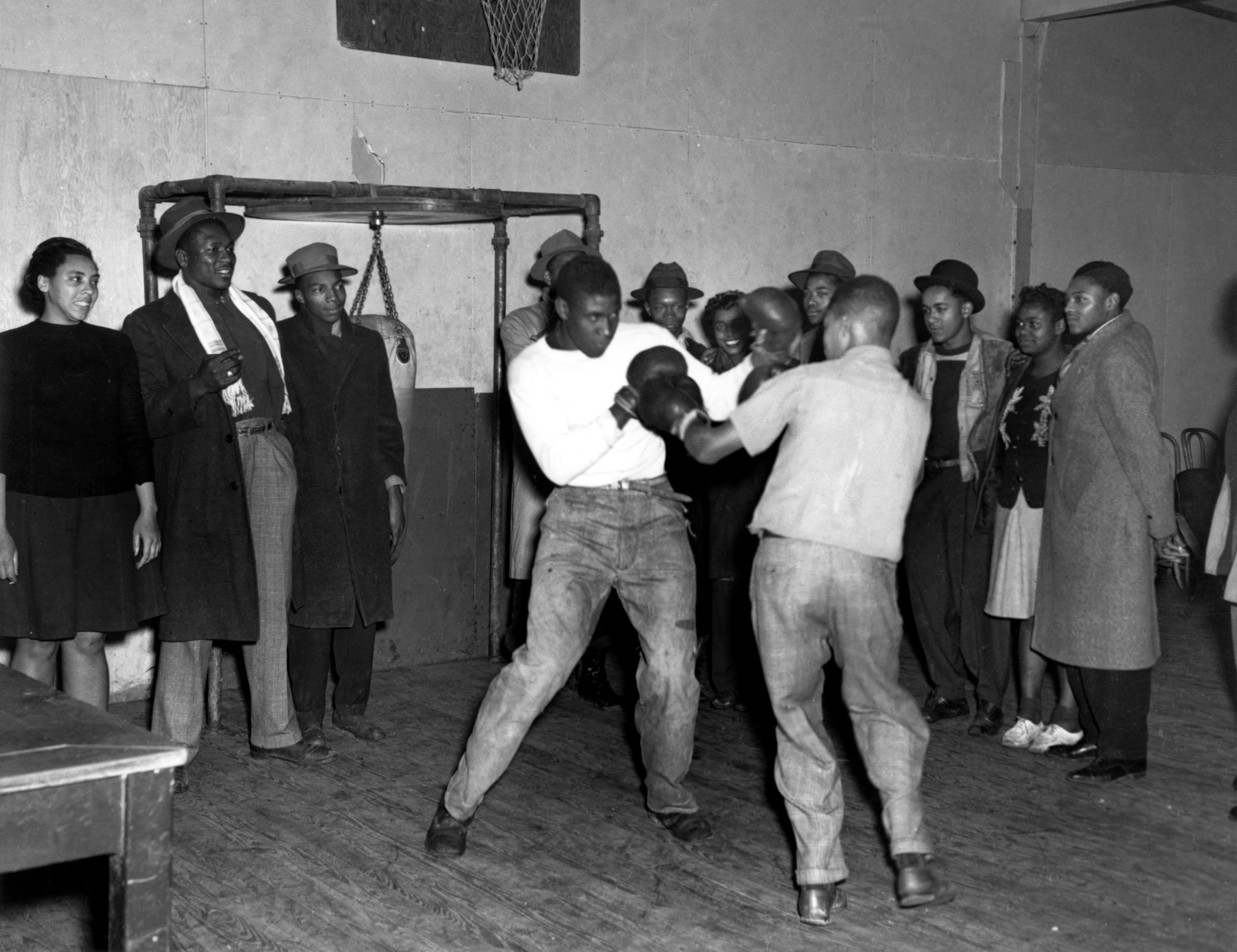
Boxing event

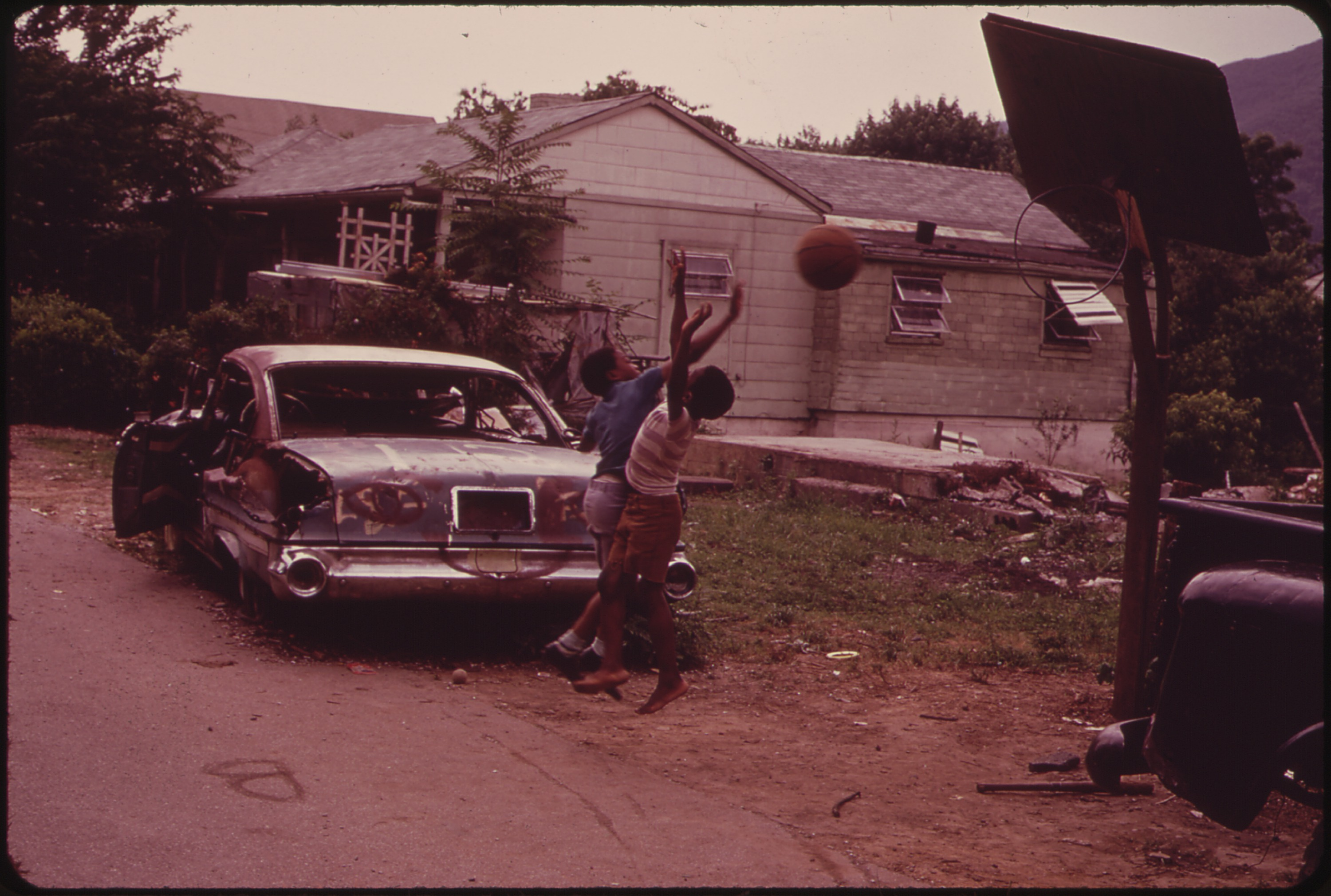
Basketball in Rand, West Virginia

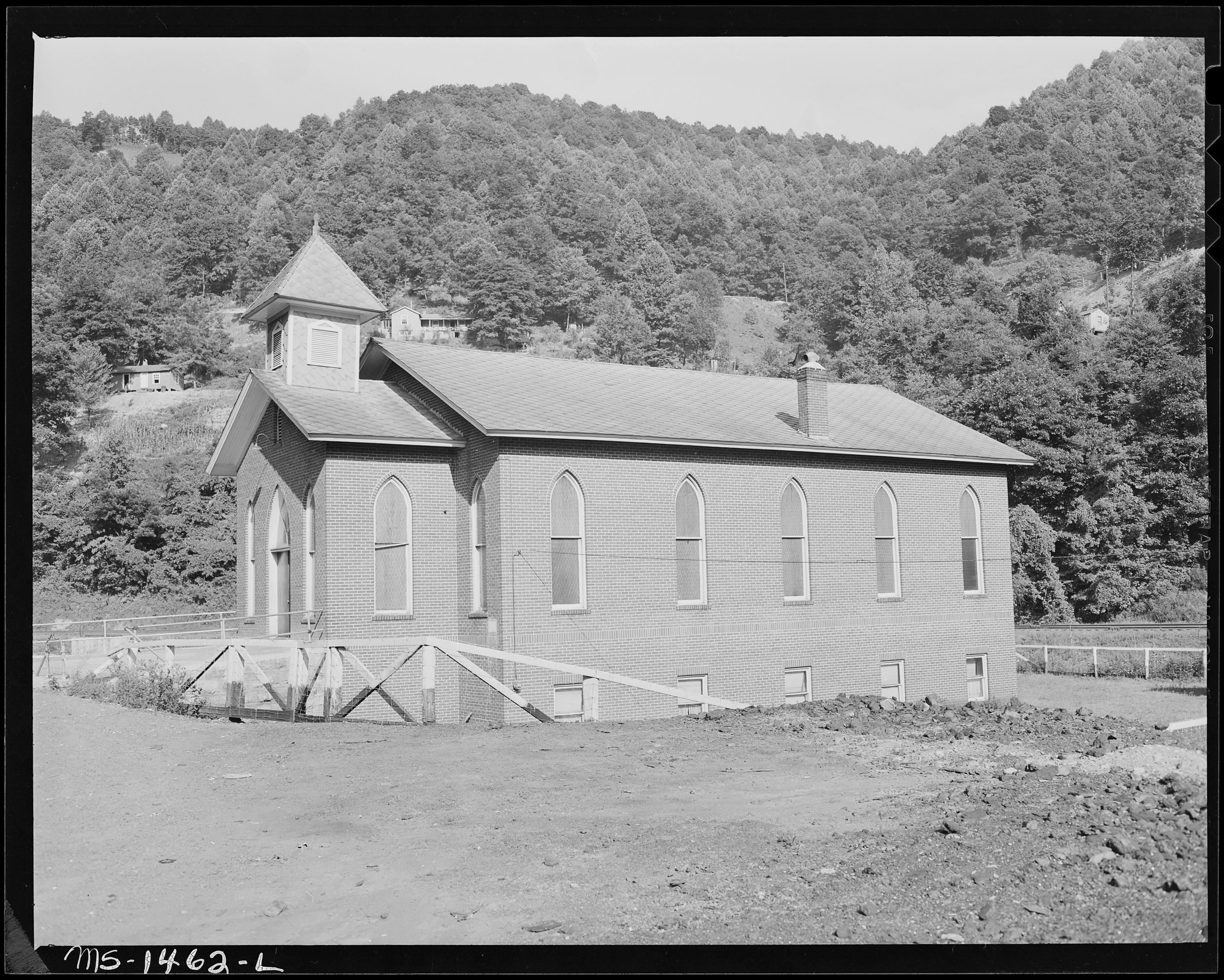
Affrilachian church

Woman preparing a poke salad

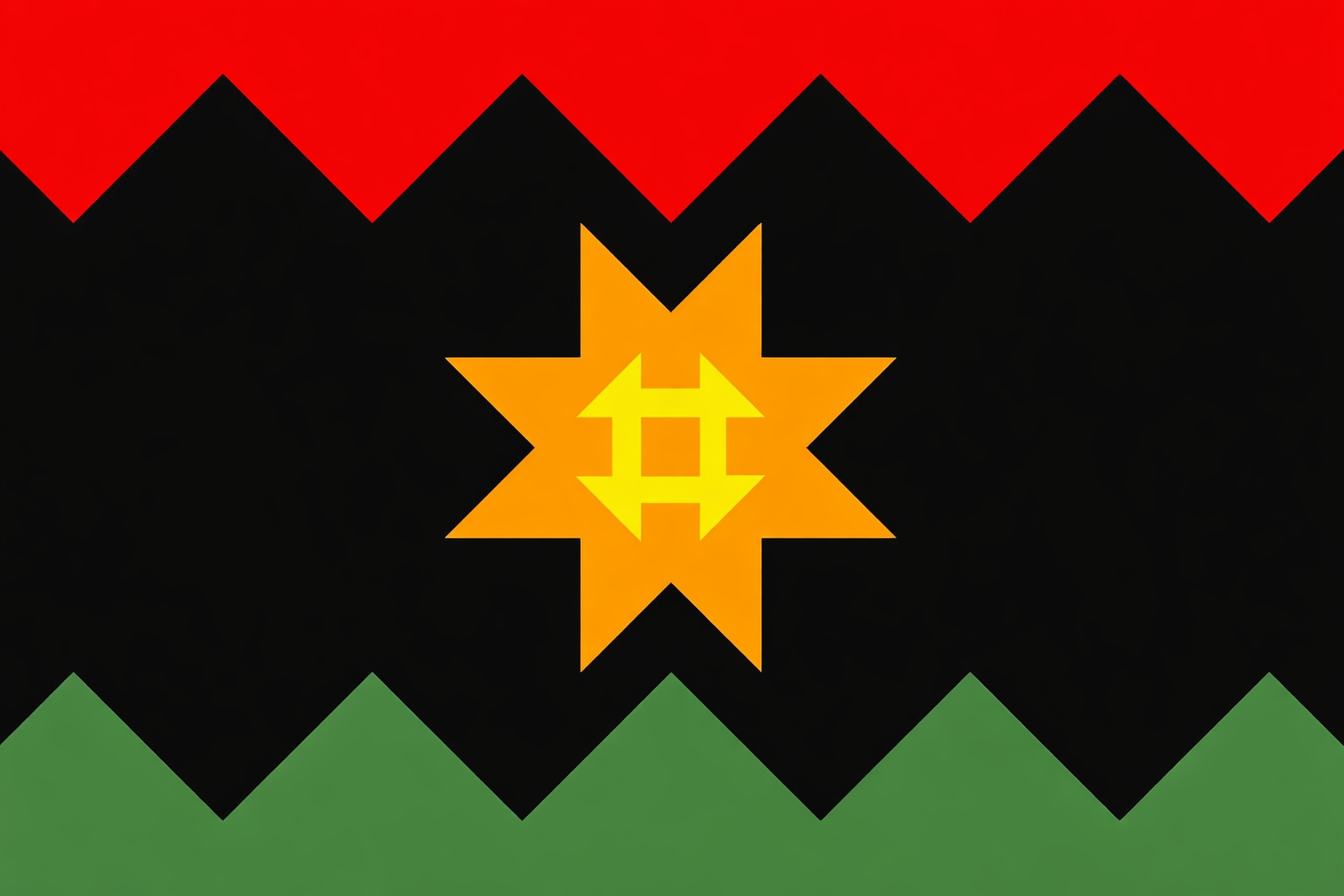
An Affliachian flag

=== Mixed-race groups ===
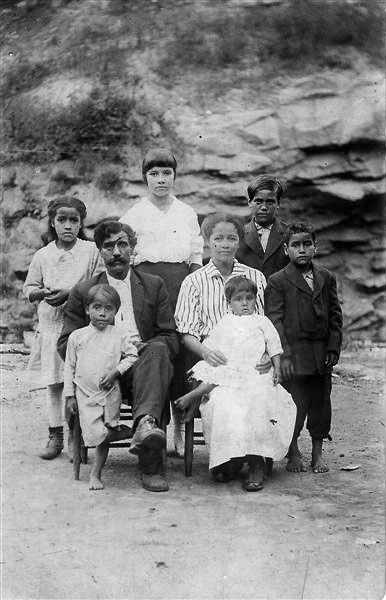
Melungeons

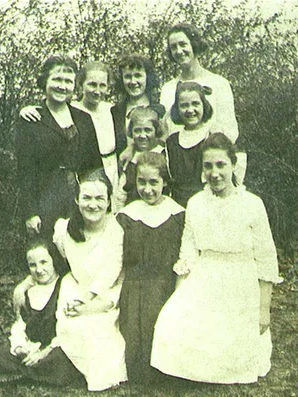
Melungeons in Asheville

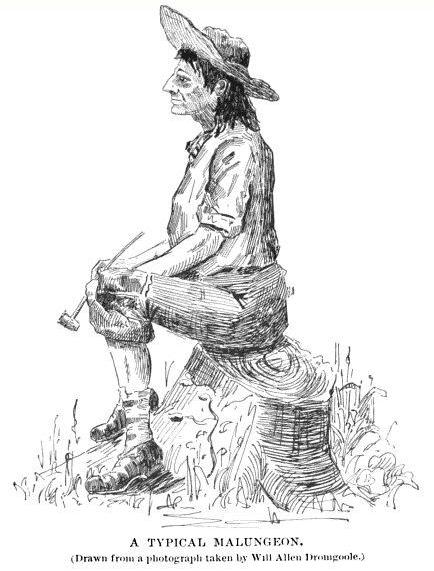
Depiction of a Melungeon

=== Notable people ===
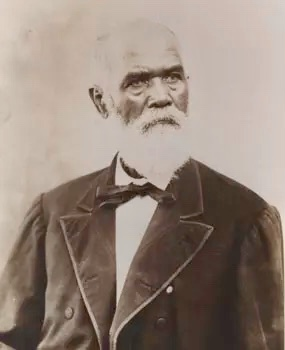
Sam Johnson, laborer, carpenter and musician

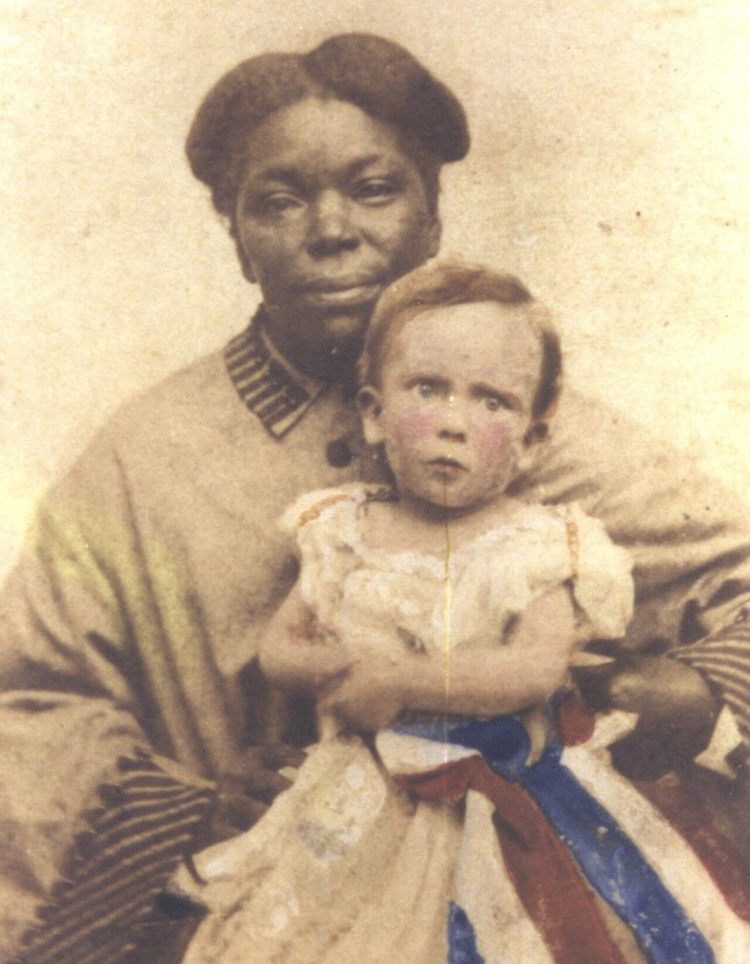
Dolly Johnson (Aunt Dolly), small-business owner and chef

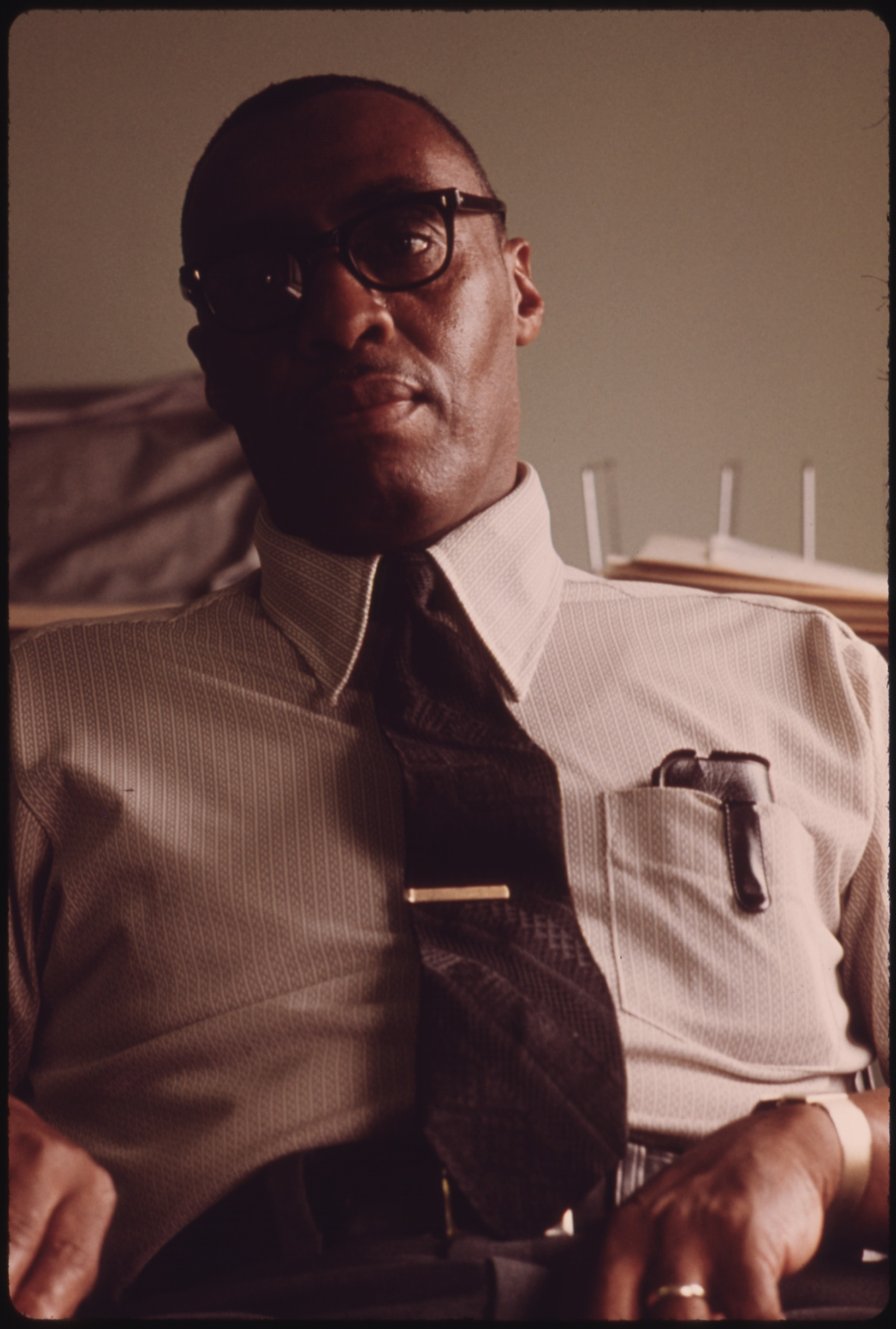
Levi Danials, director of field services for the United Mine Workers of America

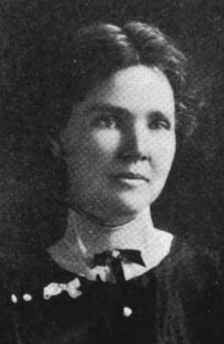
Celeste Brackett Newcomer, educator at Storer College

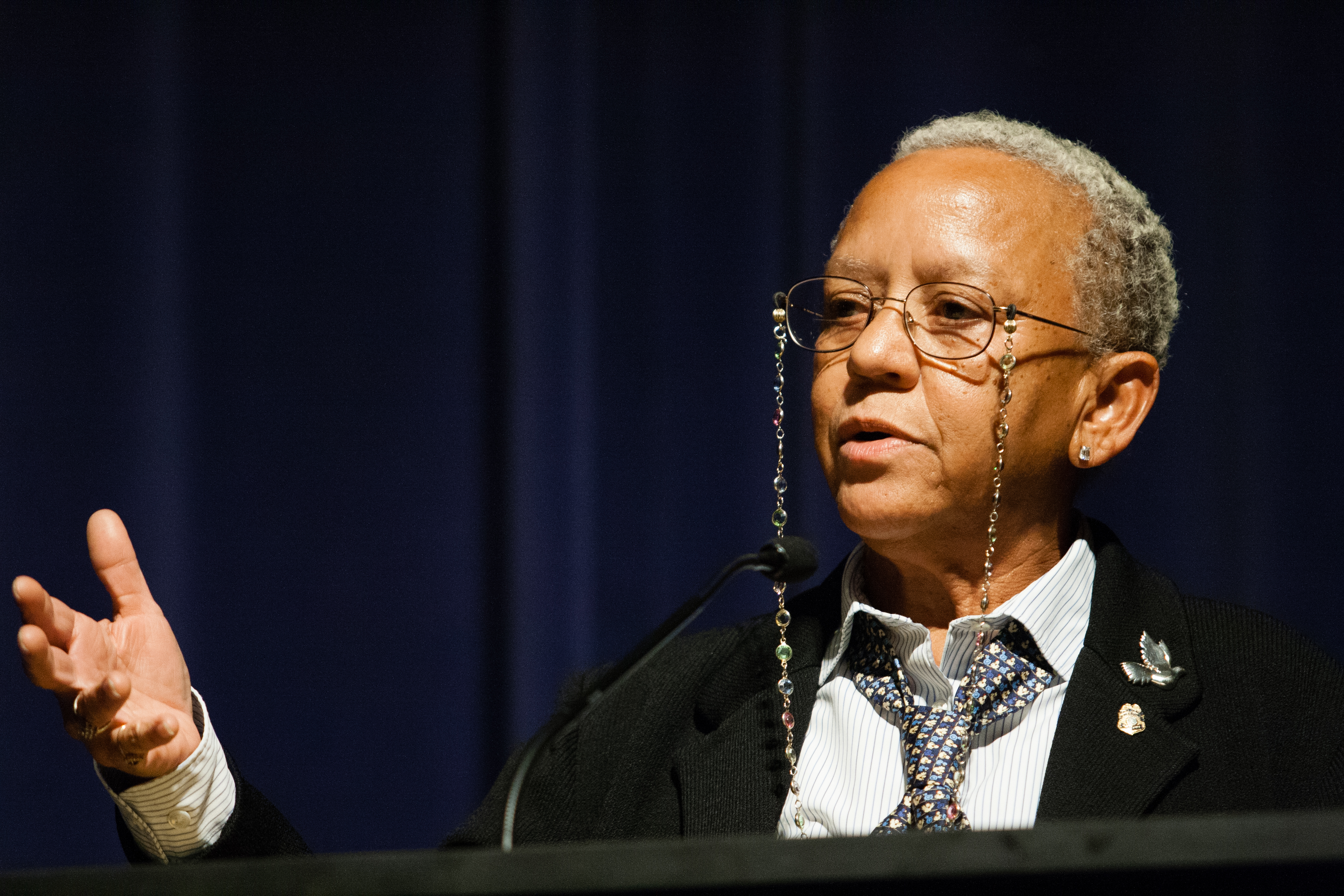
Nikki Giovanni, poet

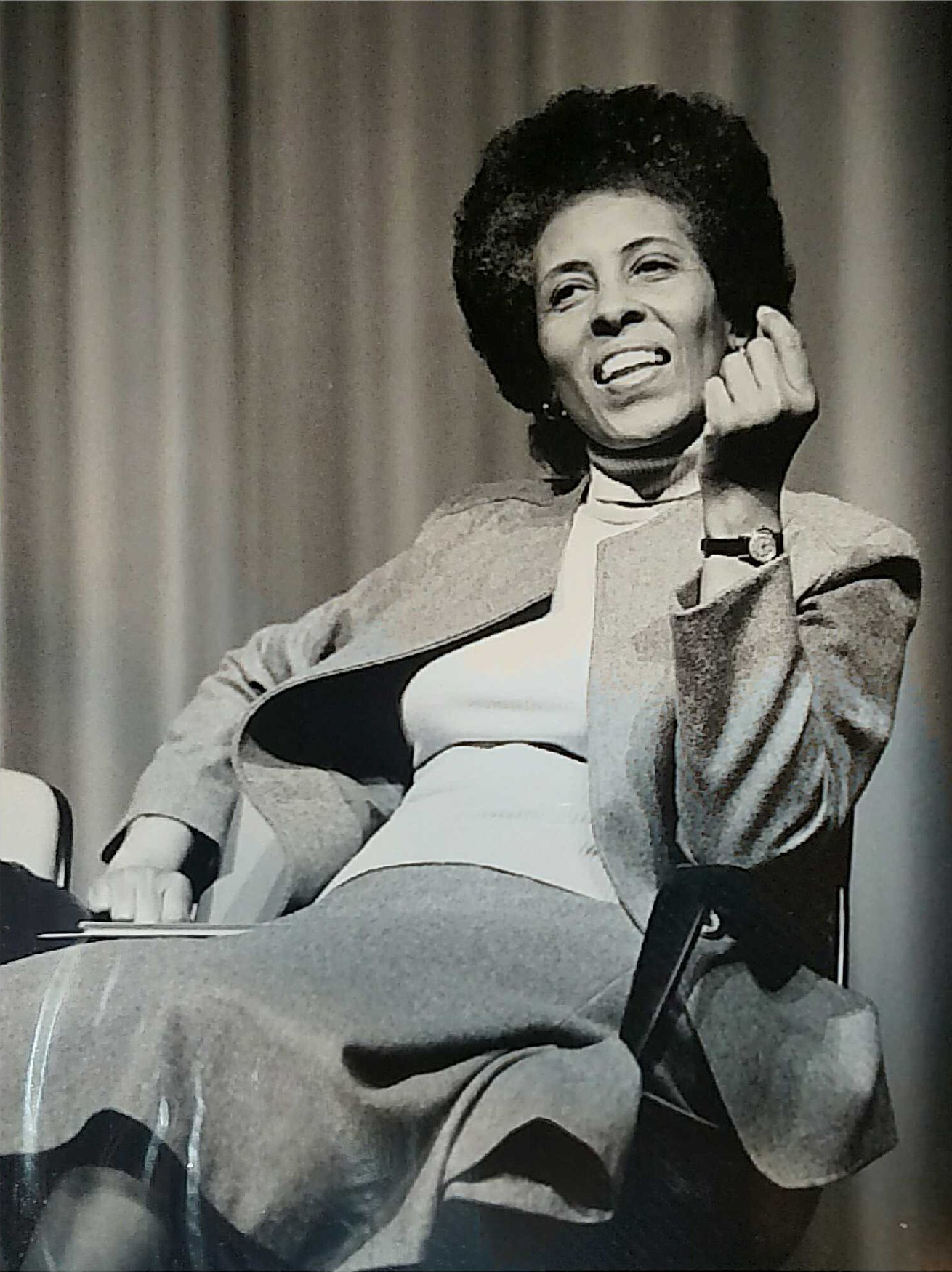
Ancella Radford Bickley, historian

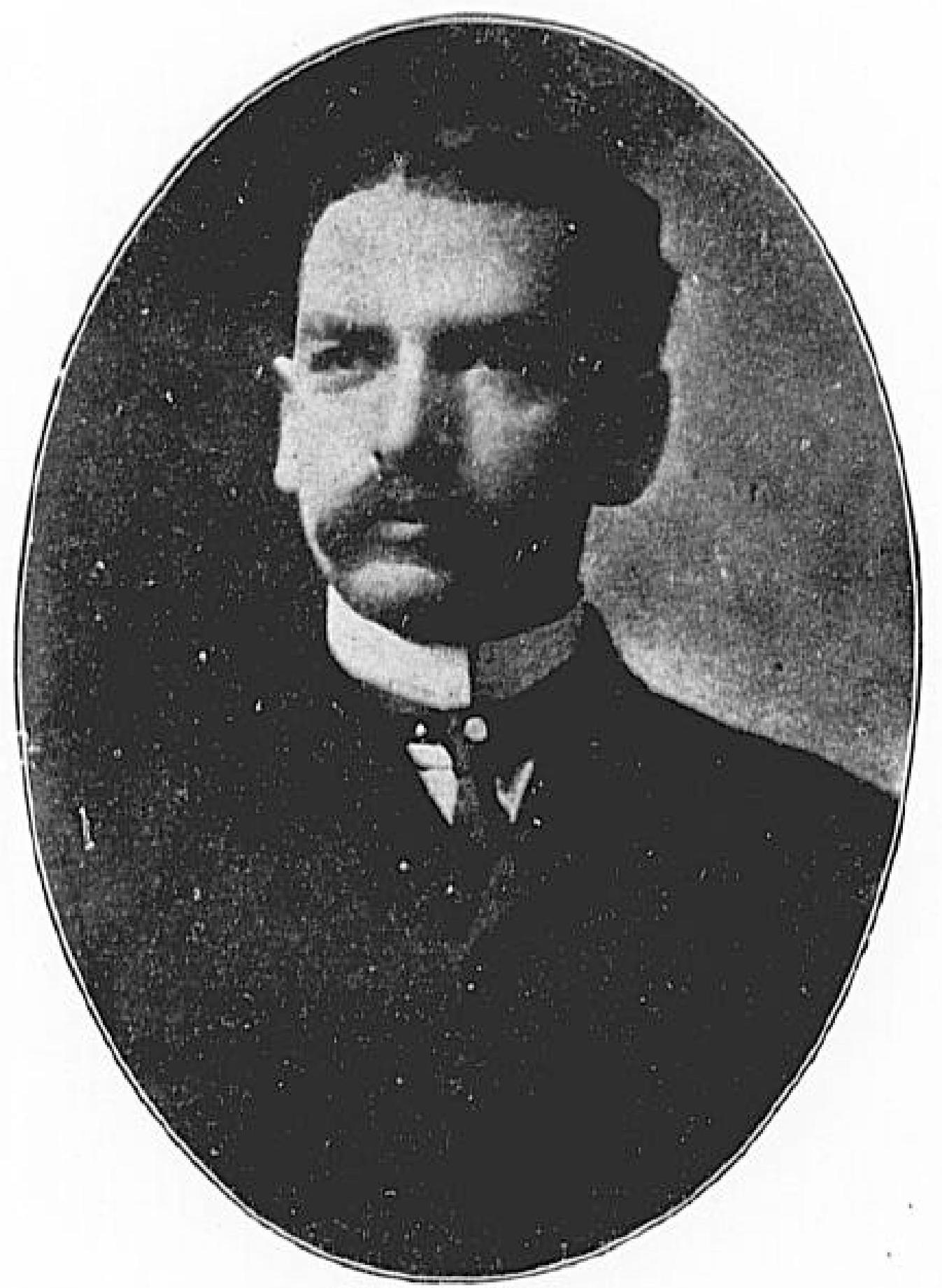
Samuel W. Starks, fraternity leader and librarian

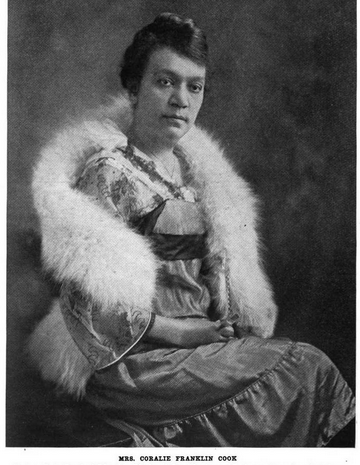
Coralie Franklin Cook, women's rights activist and orator

== Stereotypes ==
Affrilachians have long faced a history of erasure, seldom being depicted in representations of Appalachia. Both socially and academically, Affrilachians have been considered a neglected racial minority.

=== Homogeneous myth ===
As an erroneous generalization, Appalachia has been characterized as a place lacking in diversity, where Native Americans were entirely pushed out and whose inhabitants are entirely white, mainly of Scotch-Irish, Anglo, or German stock. White supremacist fictions of racial purity supported the visibility of White Appalachians and the invisibility of Affrilachians and other minority groups. The mono-racial myth is also fueled by the incorrect assumption that slavery was less relevant in Southern Appalachia than in other parts of the South; while larger scale plantations were less common in Southern Appalachia, slavery was still ubiquitous.

=== Minstrel shows ===
Blackface minstrelsy was the first uniquely American form of theatre and the first large-scale appropriation of Black culture by white Americans. Minstrel shows were used to portray African Americans as unintelligent, superstitious, or lacking in moral character. The banjo, a central aspect of Affrilachian musical culture, was used as a mainstay in minstrel bands.

== Notable people ==
- Jovan Adepo, actor
- Lovie Austin, bandleader
- BbyMutha, rapper
- Chris Chalk, actor
- Cylk Cozart, director and actor
- Cleavant Derricks, singer and actor
- Jermaine Dupri, music executive
- Elizabeth Harden Gilmore, activist
- Nikki Giovanni, poet
- Mr. Mack, rapper
- Isaiah Rashad, singer
- Valaida Snow, jazz musician
- Clyde Stubblefield, drummer
- Leon Sullivan, minister and activist
- Frank X Walker, poet
- Booker T. Washington, educator and author
- Nina Simone, composer, concert pianist, singer, songwriter, Civil Rights activist

== See also ==
- Melungeons, a mixed-race group of Affrilachians and White Appalachians
  - Carmel Melungeons
  - Chestnut Ridge people
- Black Ozarkers, commonly descended from Affrilachians
- Creoles of color
- Gullah people
- Black Southerners
- Appalachian Americans
- Cherokee Freedmen
