= Marie (given name) =

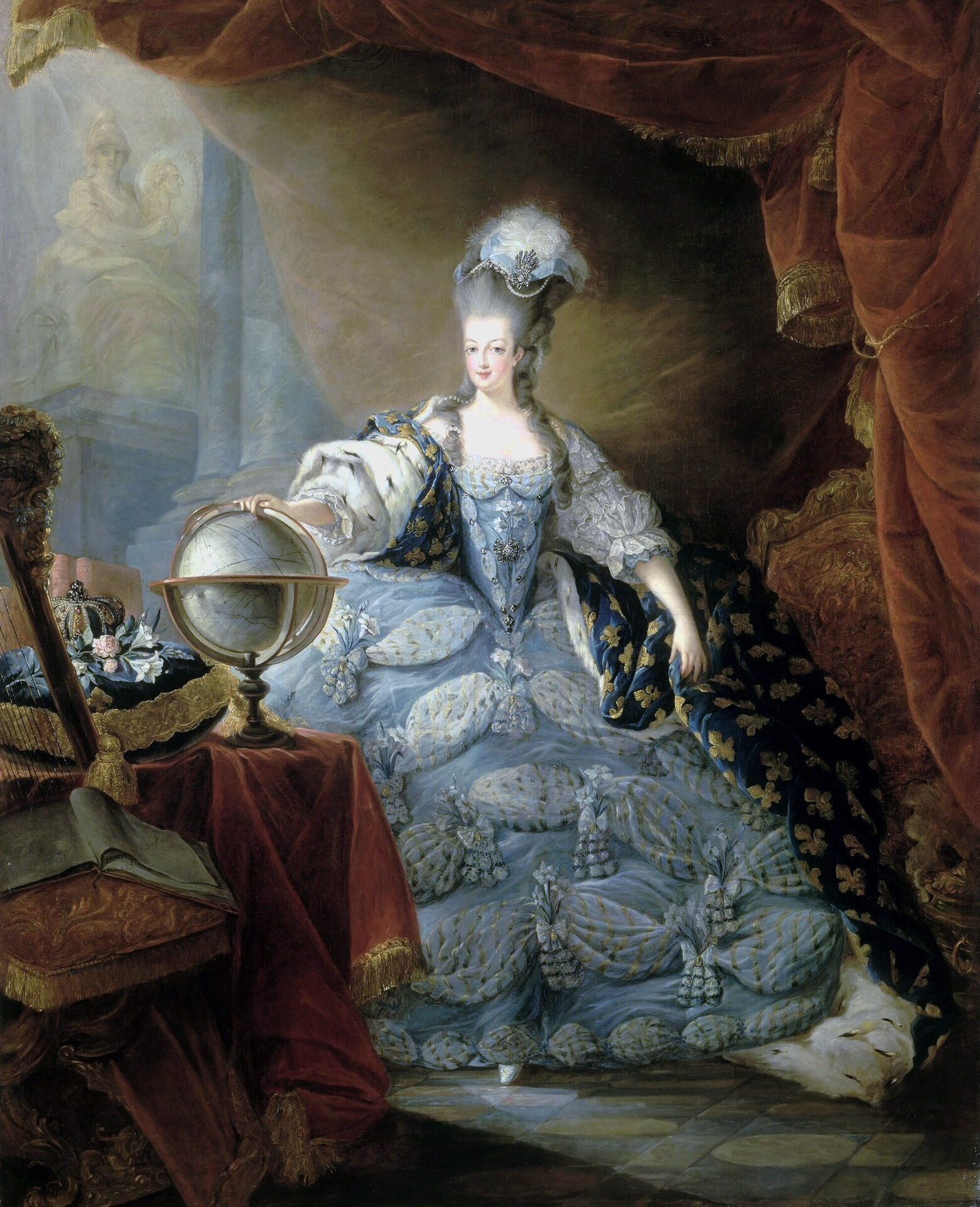
- Marie Antoinette, the last Queen of France prior to the French Revolution
- Pronunciation: French: [maʁi] Czech: [ˈmarɪjɛ] English: /mæˈriː, məˈriː/
- Gender: Female

Origin
- Origin: Biblical Hebrew, via Syro-Aramaic, Greek, Latin

Other names
- Related names: Maree, Maarja, Máire, Marié, Maria, Mariah, Mary, Elmarie

Marie is a variation of the feminine given name Maria.

It is also the standard form of the name in Czech, and is also used in Danish, English, German, Norwegian, and Swedish.

Marie, Marié or Mariê (真理絵、万里絵、麻里絵、まりえ、マリエ) is also a feminine Japanese name.

== Compound names ==
=== Feminine ===
- Marie Adelaide
- Marie-Agnès
- Marie-Aimée
- Marie-Alice
- Marie-Amélie
- Marie-Andrée
- Marie-Ange
- Marie-Angélique
- Marie-Anne
- Marie-Annick
- Marie-Antoinette
- Marie-Bernadette
- Marie-Catherine
- Marie-Cécile
- Marie-Chantal
- Marie-Charlotte
- Marie-Christine
- Marie-Claire
- Marie-Claude
- Marie-Clementine
- Marie-Denise
- Marie-Dominique
- Marie-Ernestine
- Marie-Eugénie
- Marie-Ève
- Marie-Félicité
- Marie-France
- Marie-Francine
- Marie-Françoise
- Marie-Gabrielle
- Marie-Geneviève
- Marie-Georges
- Marie-Hélène
- Marie-Jeanne
- Marie-Jo
- Marie-José
- Marie-Julie
- Marie-Laure
- Marie-Laurence
- Marie-Léontine
- Marie-Line
- Marie Louise
- Marie Luise
- Marie-Luce
- Marie-Lucie
- Marie-Madeleine
- Marie-Marguerite
- Marie-Michèle
- Marie-Nicole
- Marie-Noëlle
- Marie-Odette
- Marie-Odile
- Marie-Paule
- Marie-Pauline
- Marie-Pier
- Marie-Pierre
- Marie-Rosalie
- Marie Rose
- Marie-Soleil
- Marie Sophie
- Marie Thérèse
- Marie-Victoire
- Anne-Marie

=== Masculine ===
French Marie, just as Italian Maria and Spanish María, is traditionally also used in masculine compound names.

- Marie-Alphonse
- Marie-Charles
- Marie-Joseph
- Marie-Théodore
- Alphonse-Marie
- André-Marie
- François-Marie
- Jacques-Marie
- Jean-Marie
- Louis-Marie
- Paul-Marie
- Pierre-Marie

== See also ==
- Marie (disambiguation)
- Princess Marie (disambiguation)
- Duchess Marie (disambiguation)
- Maria (disambiguation)
