= Marie-Odile =

Marie-Odile is a French feminine given name, composed of Marie and Odile. It may refer to:

- Marie Odile Bonkoungou-Balima (born 1961), Burkinabé ambassador
- Marie-Odile Bouillé (born 1950), French politician
- Marie-Odile Cordier (born 1950), French computer scientist
- Marie-Odile Marceau, Canadian architect
- Marie-Odile Raymond (born 1973), Canadian cross-country skier
- Marie-Odile Soyer-Gobillard (born 1939), French biologist
- a character in the 1998 film Madeline
