= Maria Pope =

Maria Pope may refer to:

- Maria Ann Campion (1775–1803), Irish actress and second wife of actor Alexander Pope
- Maria Sophia Pope (1818–1909), New Zealand shopkeeper and businesswoman
