= Marie-France =

Marie-France is a French feminine given name. Notable people with the name include:

- Marie-France (actress) (born 1943), French actress
- Marie-France Alvarez, French actress
- Marie-France Banc (1876–1965), French nun, Righteous among the Nations
- Marie-France Bazzo, Canadian broadcaster
- Marie-France Beaufils (born 1946), member of the Senate of France
- Marie-France Boyer (born 1938), French actress and singer
- Marie-France Cohen, French fashion designer
- Marie-France Curtil, French slalom canoeist
- Marie-France Dubreuil (born 1974), Canadian ice dancer
- Marie-France Dufour (1949–1990), French singer
- Marie-France Gaite (1941–1968), French singer
- Marie-France Garaud (1934–2024), French politician
- Marie-France Garcia (born 1946), French singer and actress
- Marie-France van Helden (born 1959), French speed skater
- Marie-France Hirigoyen (born 1949), French psychiatrist, psychoanalyst and psychotherapist
- Marie-France Lalonde (born 1971), Canadian politician
- Marie-France Larouche (born 1980), Canadian curler
- Marie-France Lorho (born 1964), French politician
- Marie-France Loval (born 1964), French sprinter
- Marie-France Mignal (born 1940), French actress
- Marie-France Morin (born 1976), Canadian ice hockey player
- Marie-France Pisier (1944–2011), French actress
- Marie-France Plumer (born 1943), French actress
- Marie-France Sagot (born 1956), director of research of INRIA
- Marie-France Stirbois (1944–2006), French National Front politician
- Marie-France Vignéras (born 1946), French mathematician

== See also ==
- Marie (given name)
- France (name)
