= Marie-Louise-Adélaïde Boizot =

French engraver

Marie-Louise-Adélaïde Boizot (French: [maʁi lwiz adelaid bwazo]; 1744, Paris – 1800, Paris) was a French engraver whose works have been on exhibition around the world.

== Biography ==
Marie-Louise-Adélaïde Boizot was the second of the seven children born to the painter Antoine Boizot (1702–1782) and Jeanne Flottes (1715–1762). Her older brother was the designer and sculptor Louis-Simon Boizot (1743–1809). She hailed from an artistic family as her father's first wife, who died, was Marie Oudry (daughter of the engraver Marie-Marguerite Oudry (1688–1780) and the painter Jean-Baptiste Oudry (1686–1755)).

She learned drawing under her father's direction before becoming a student of Jean-Jacques Flipart in engraving.

== Works ==
Boizot's works have been housed and exhibited at the Metropolitan Museum of Art, the National Gallery of Art in Washington, D.C., the Statens Museum for Kunst, and the Victoria and Albert Museum.

== Expositions ==
- Marie-Antoinette, Paris, Grand Palais, March-June 2008.

== Gallery ==
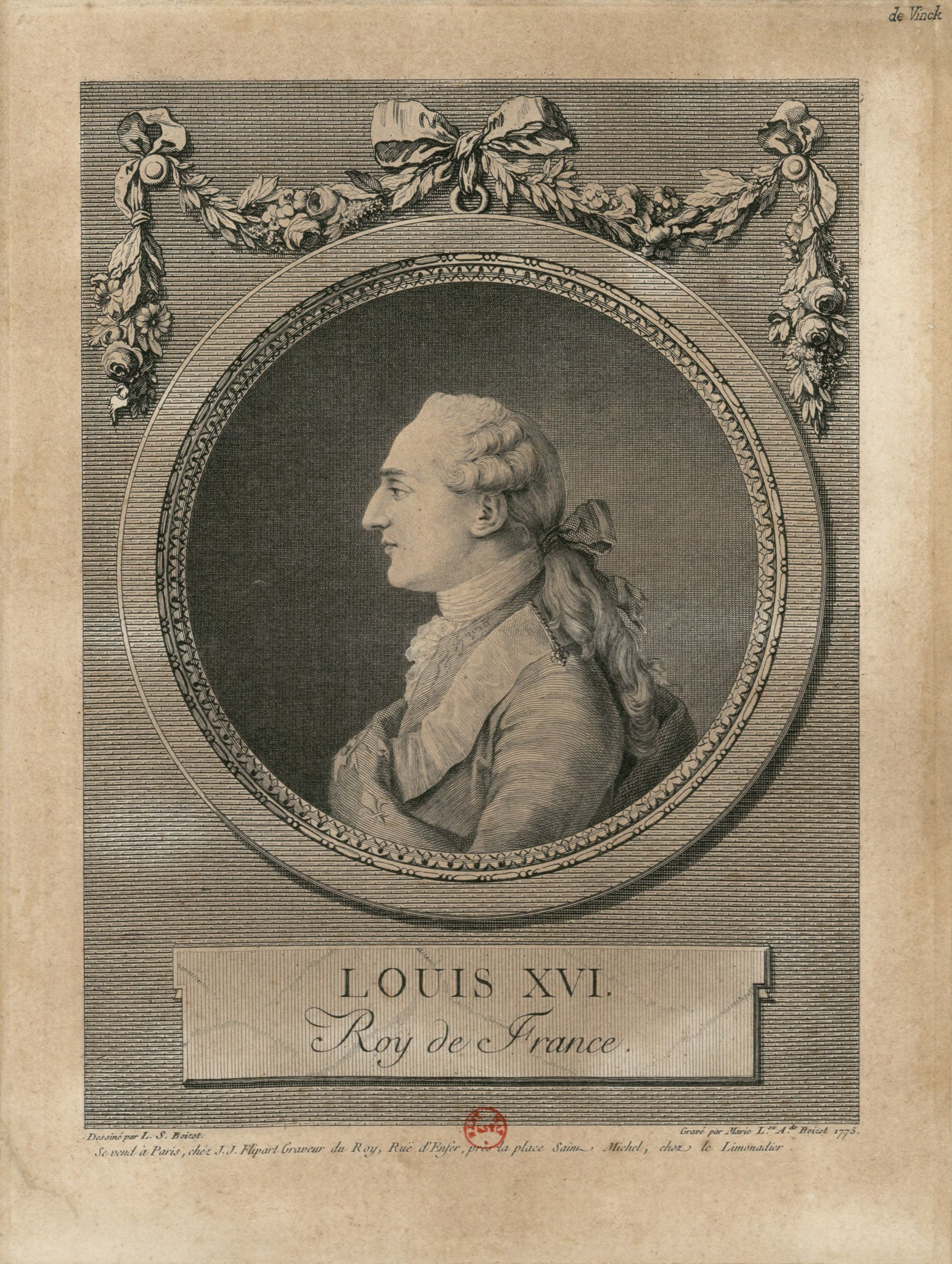
Louis XVI (1775)

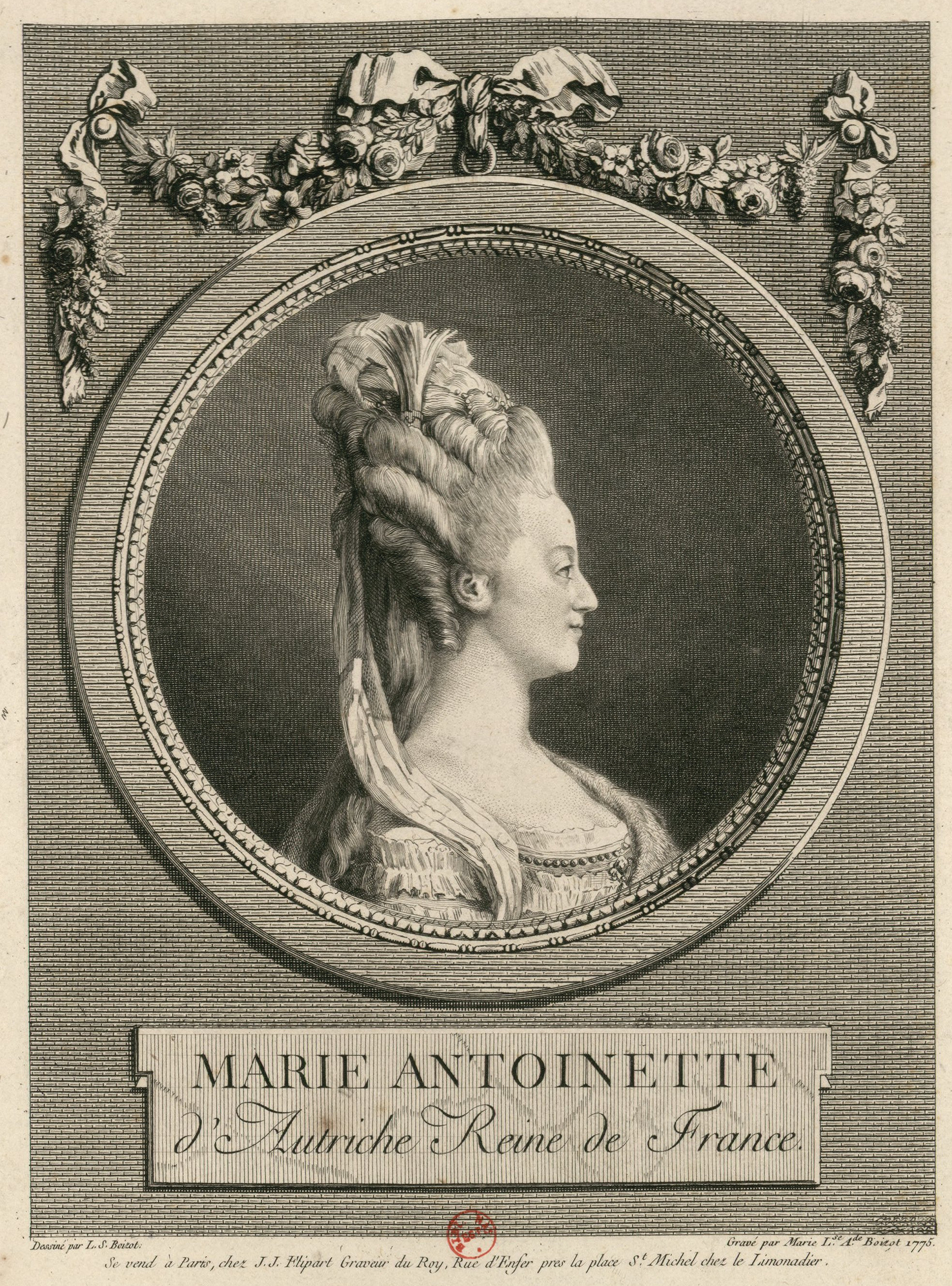
Marie-Antoinette (1775)

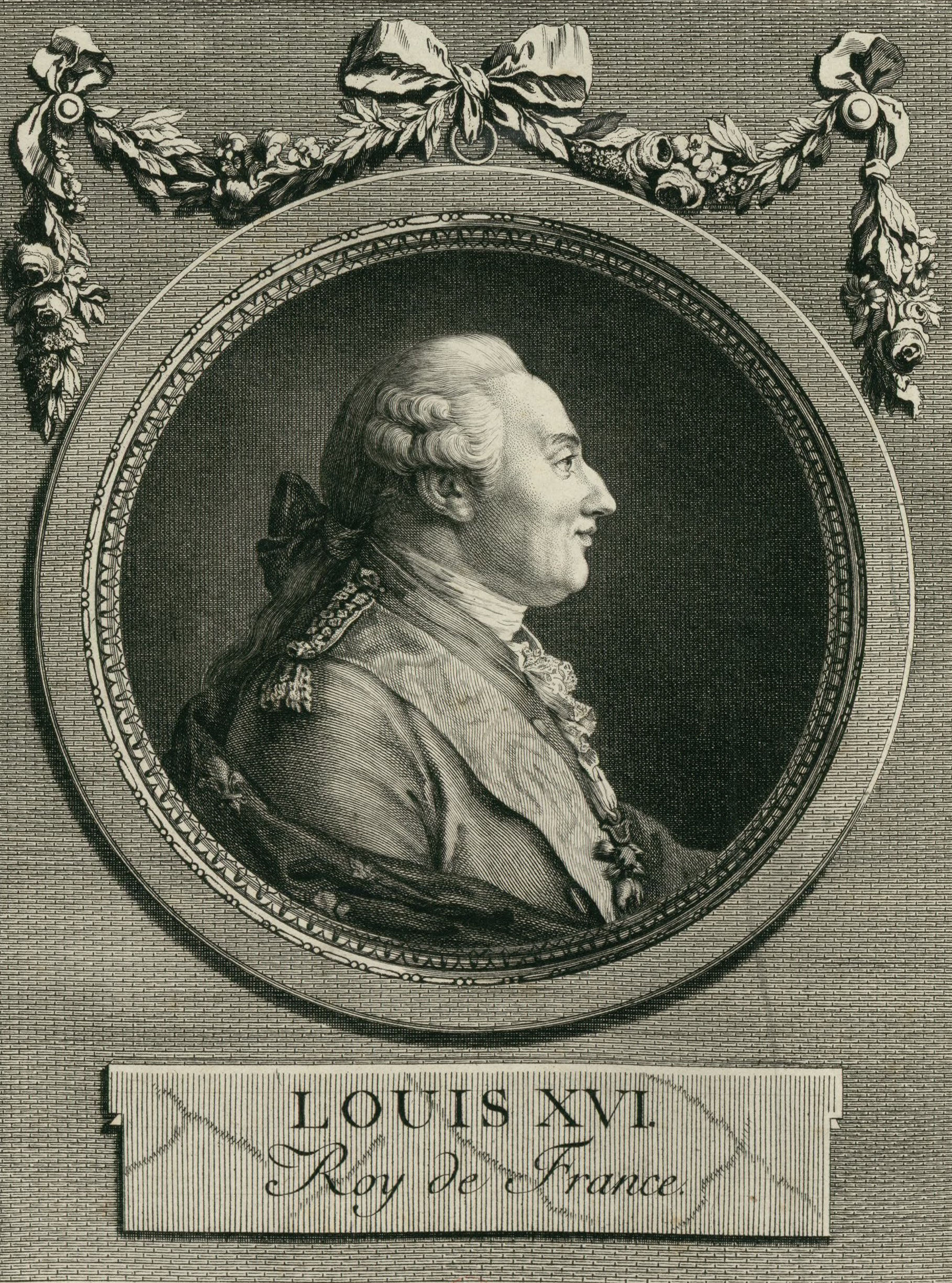
Louis XVI (1781)

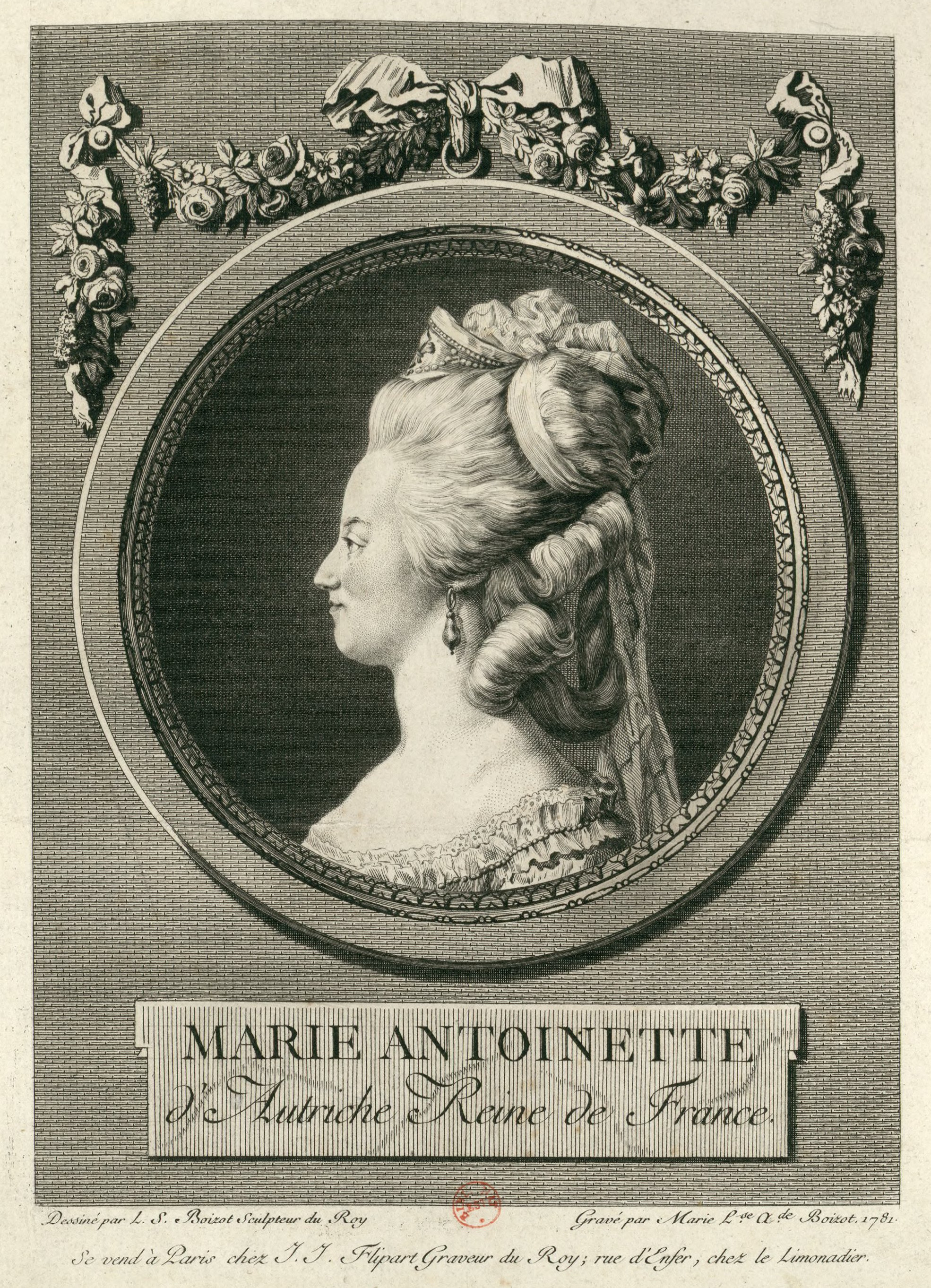
Marie-Antoinette (1781)

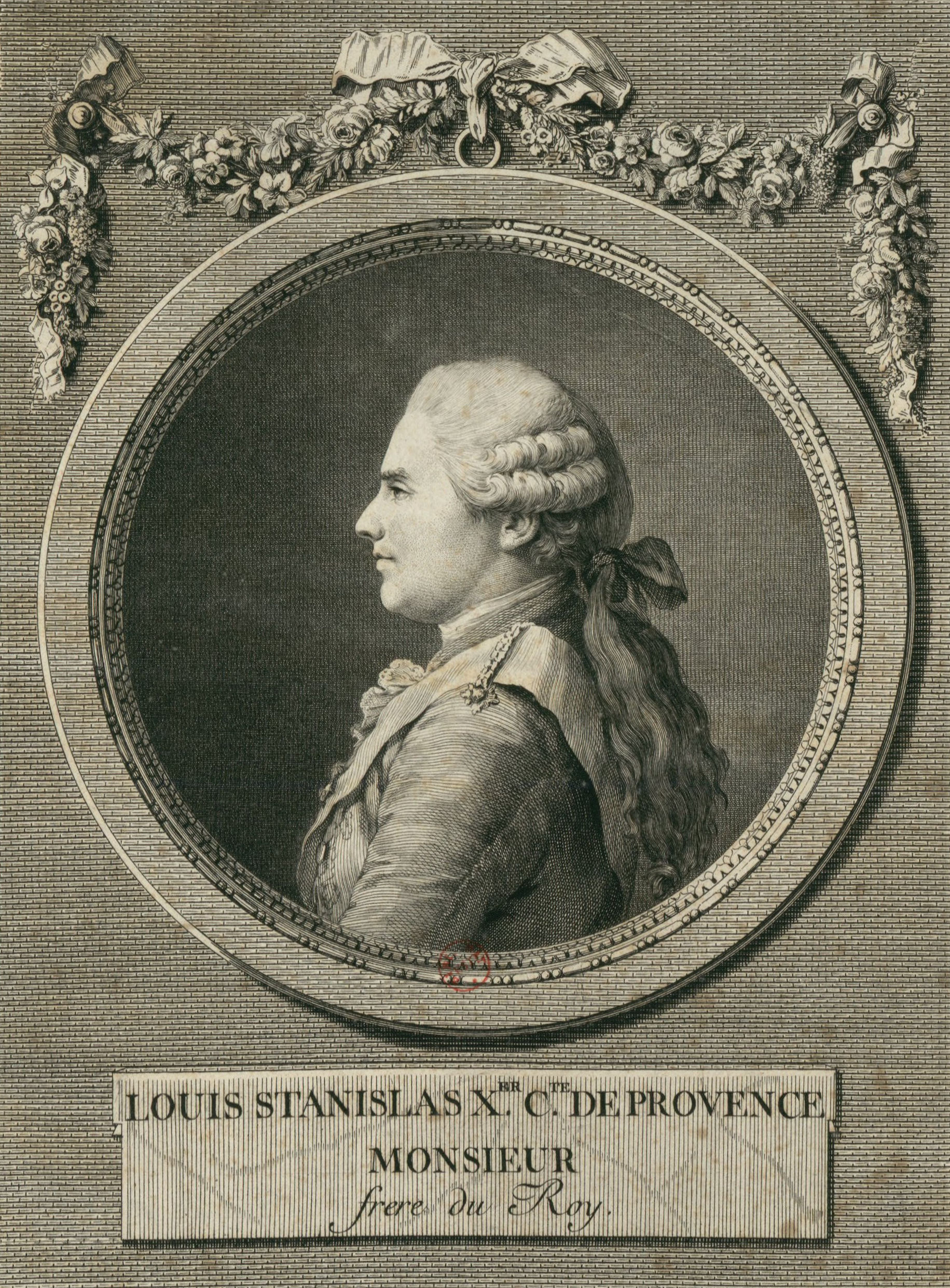
Louis Stanislas Xavier, Comte de Provence

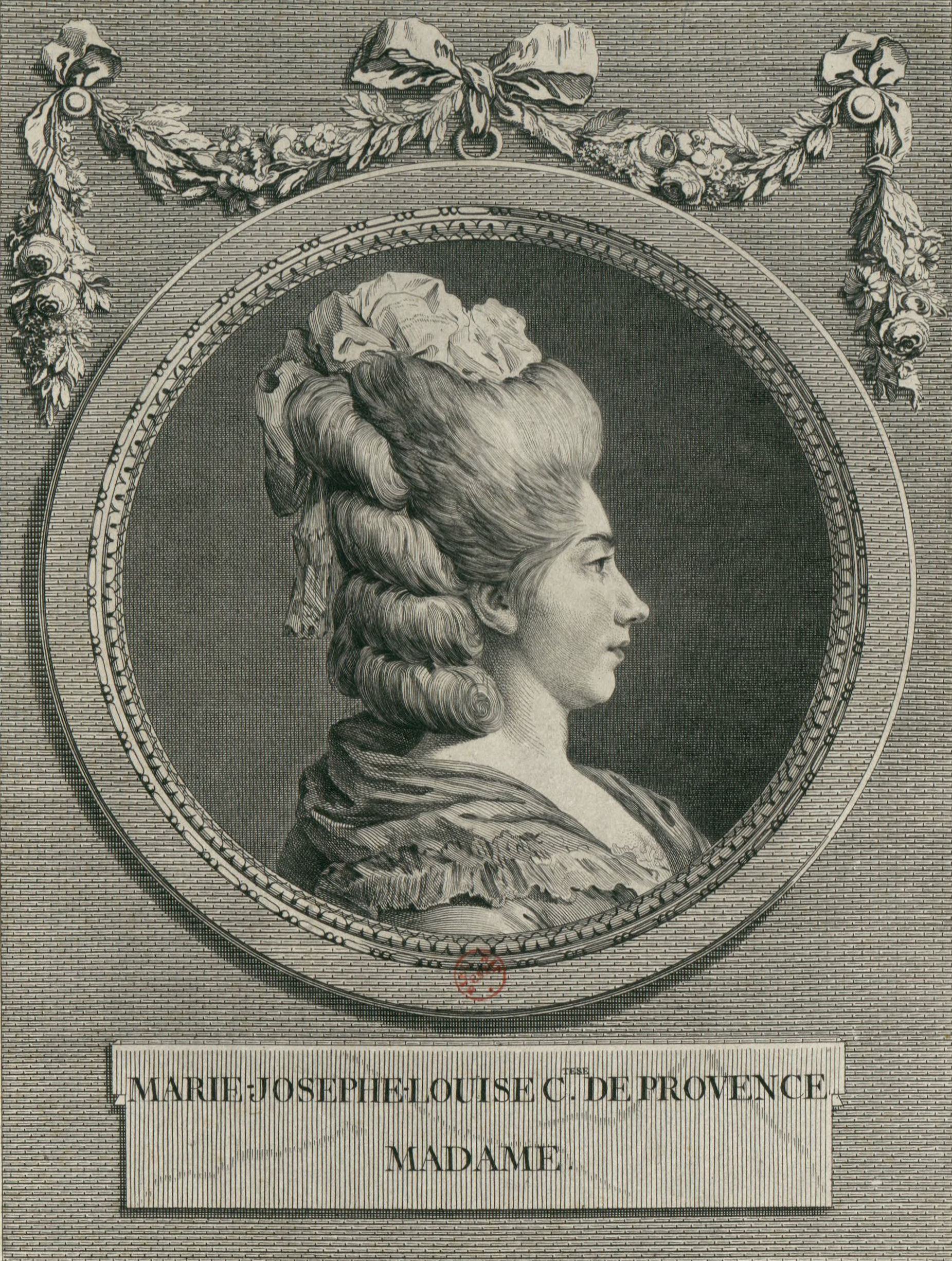
'Marie Joséphine of Savoy'

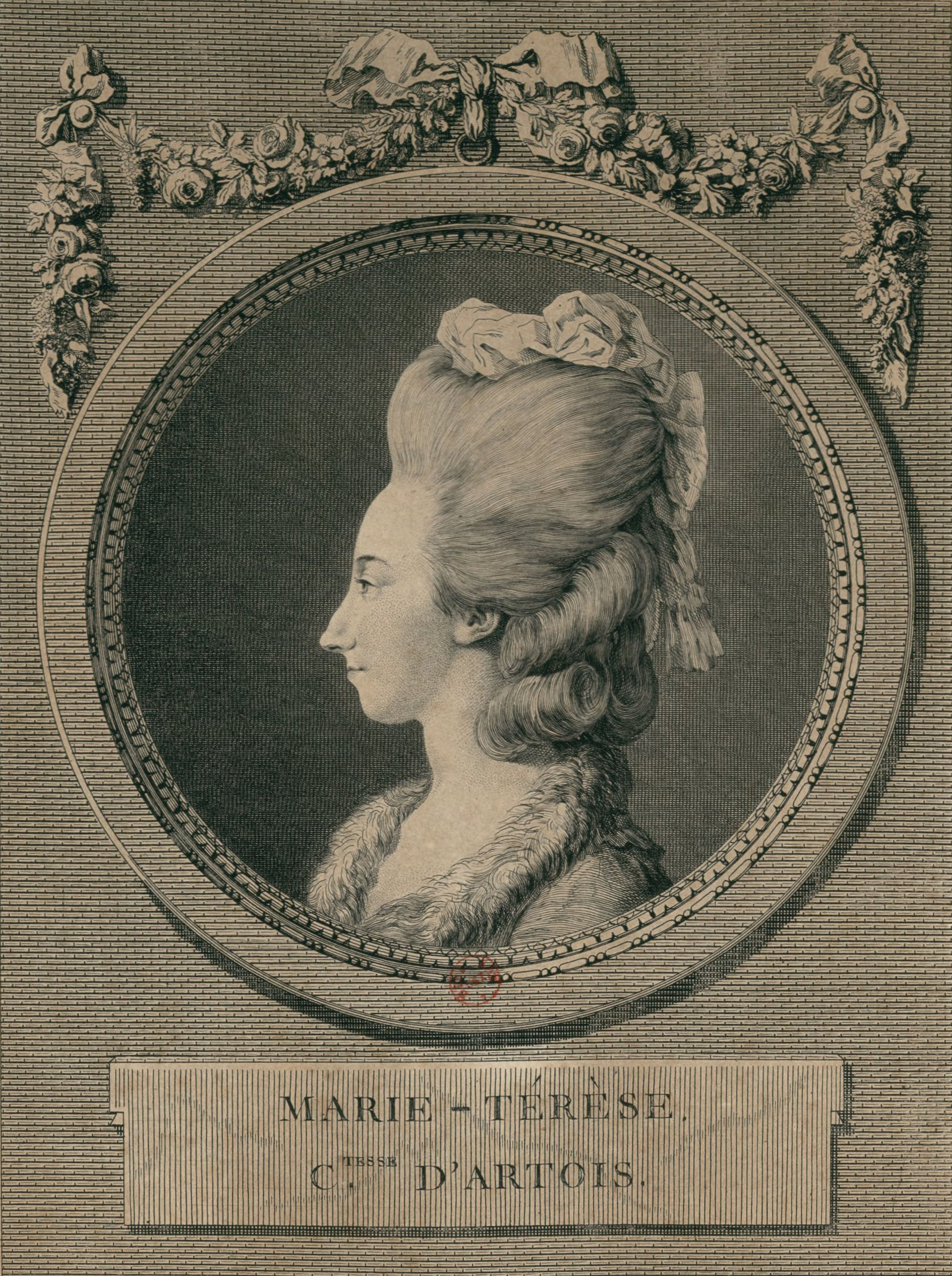
Maria Theresa of Savoy

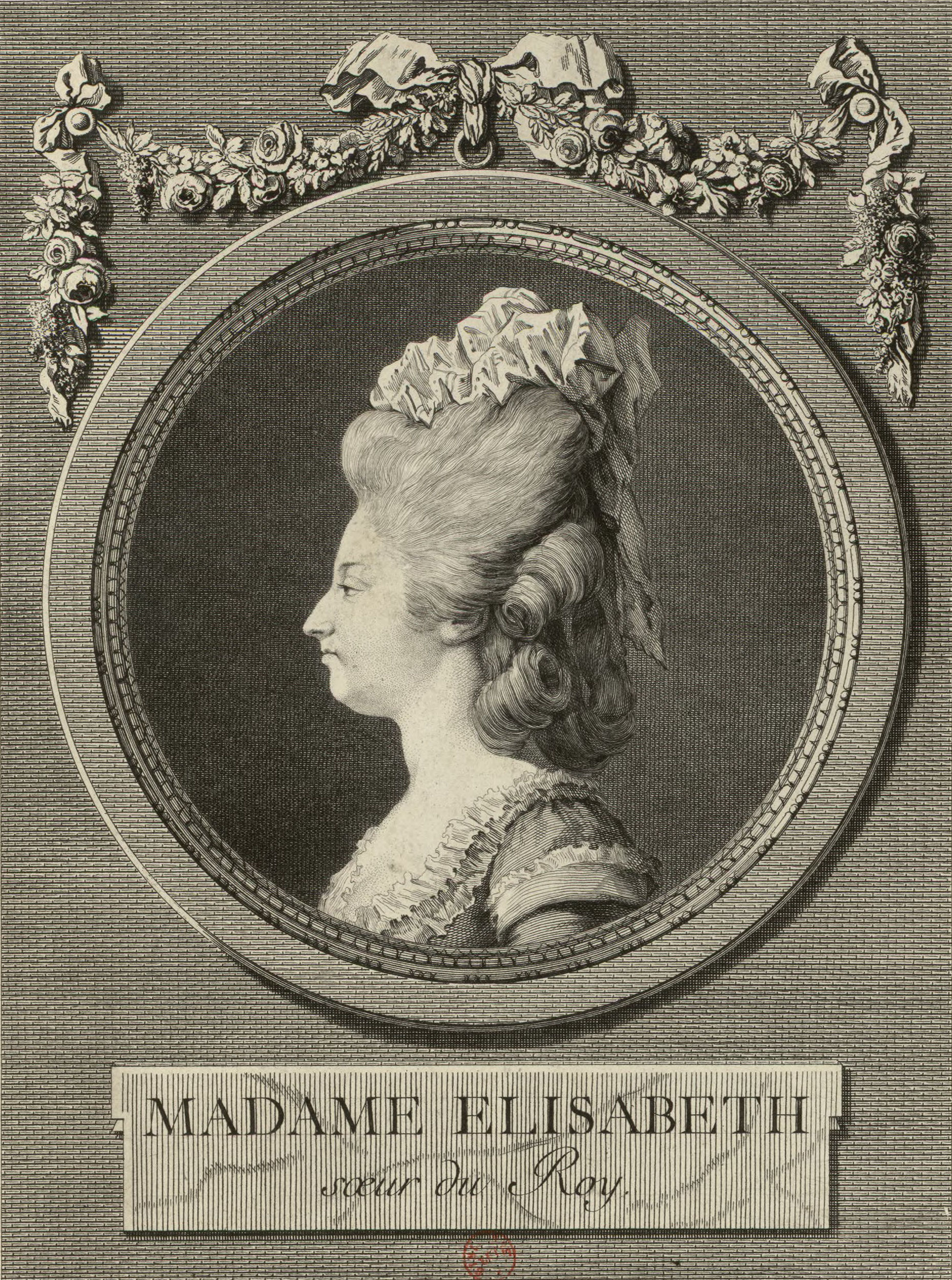
Élisabeth of France

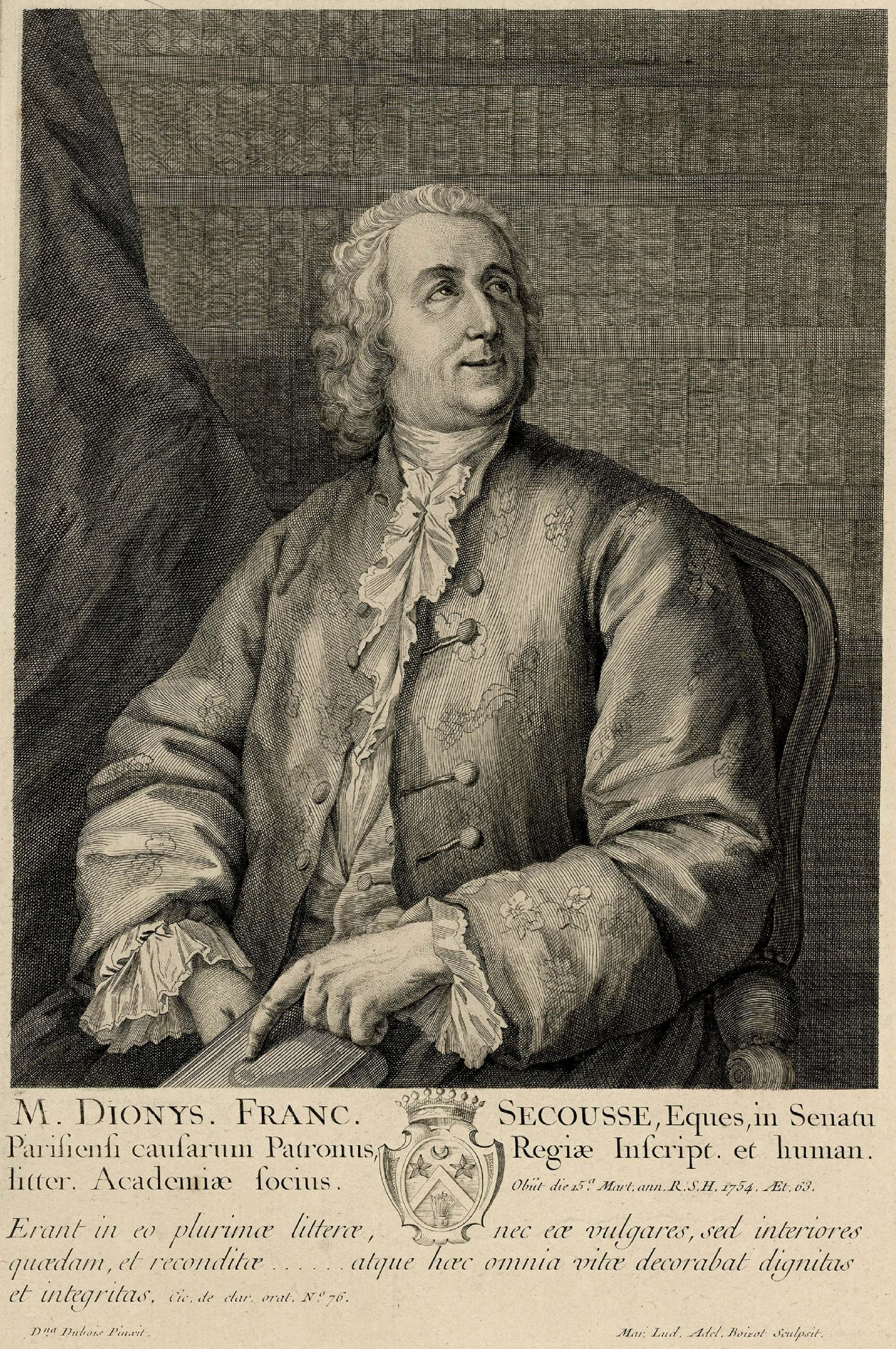
Denis-Francois Secousse
