= Julie-Marie =

Julie-Marie is a compound given name. Notable people with the name include:

- Julie-Marie Parmentier (born 1981), French actress
- Julie-Marie Strange (born 1973), British historian

== See also ==
- Marie-Julie, another compound given name
