= Marie-Angélique =

Marie-Angélique or Marie Angélique is a feminine compound given name which may refer to:

== People ==
- Marie-Angélique Allais (1767–1827), French engraver
- Marie Angélique Arnauld (1591–1661), French abbess and Jansenist
- Marie-Angélique de Bombelles (1762–1800), Marquise de Bombelles, French court office holder and letter writer, maid of honour and confidante of Princess Élisabeth of France
- Marie-Angélique Brûlon (1772–1859), French soldier who enlisted in her dead husband's regiment, later promoted to lieutenant
- Marie Angélique Foulon, birth name of Angélique Mezzara (1793–1868), French portrait painter and miniaturist
- Marie Angélique Frémyn (1676–1763), French courtier, memoir writer and Duchess of Villars Brancas by marriage
- Marie-Angélique Guillin (died 1915), a victim of French serial killer Henri Désiré Landru
- Marie-Angélique Lacordelle (born 1987), French sprinter
- Marie-Angélique Memmie Le Blanc (c. 1712–1775), French feral child (possibly a fictional case)
- Marie-Angélique Anel Le Rebours (1731–1821), French midwife and author of an influential and pioneering manual on breastfeeding
- Marie Angélique de Mackau (1723–1801), French royal governess
- Marie-Angélique Savané (born 1947), Senegalese sociologist and feminist
- Marie Angélique de Scorailles (1661–1681), Duchess of Fontanges and mistress of King Louis XIV
- Marie-Angélique Servandoni (1749–1822), stage name Angélique D'Hannetaire, French actress and opera singer

== Fictional characters ==
- Marie Angelique, in the short story "The Hound of Death" by Agatha Christie
