= Marie-Eugénie =

Marie-Eugénie is a feminine compound given name which may refer to:

- Marie-Eugénie Caps (1892–1931), French Catholic sister who founded the Congregation of the Missionary Sisters of the Holy Spirit or Spiritaines or Spiritan Sisters
- Marie-Eugénie de Jésus (1817–1898), French Catholic saint, founder of the Religious of the Assumption

== See also ==
- Marie Eugenie Delle Grazie (1864–1931), Austrian writer
- Marie Eugénie Gabriel Denizard (1872–1959), French feminist, first woman candidate in a French presidential election
- Marie Eugenie Le Lay (born 1992), half-French, half-Thai singer, songwriter and actress
