= Marie-Odette =

Marie-Odette is a feminine compound given name. Notable people bearing the name include:

- Marie-Odette Dubois-Violette (1918–2004), first female Inspector General of National Education in France
- Marie-Odette Garin de la Morflan, birth name of Odette Laguerre (1860–1956), French feminist activist, teacher and journalist
- Marie-Odette Lorougnon (fl. 2000–2010), Ivorian politician

== See also ==
- Mary Odette, stage name of Marie Odette Goimbault (1901–1987), French silent film actress
