= Marie-Agnès =

Marie-Agnès is a French feminine given name. It may refer to:

- Marie-Agnès Courty, French geologist of the CNRS who works at the European Centre for Prehistoric Research in Tautavel
- Marie-Agnès Gillot, French ballet dancer and choreographer
- Marie Agnes Hinrichs, American physiologist and zoologist
- Marie-Agnès Labarre, member of the Senate of France
- Marie-Agnès Letrouit-Galinou, French botanist, mycologist and lichenologist
- Marie-Agnès Poussier-Winsback, member of the National Assembly of France
- Marie-Agnes Strack-Zimmermann, German politician
