= Marie-Amélie =

Marie-Amélie, Marie Amélie or Marie Amelie may refer to:

- Marie-Amélie of the Two Sicilies (1782–1866), last queen of France
- Princess Marie Amelie of Baden (1817–1888), also Duchess of Hamilton
- Marie-Amélie de Boufflers (1751–1794), French Duchess of Lauzon and of Biron
- Marie-Amélie Albrand (born 1997), Luxembourgish footballer
- Marie Amélie Cogniet (1798–1869), French painter
- Marie-Amélie Le Fur (born 1988), French Paralympic athlete

== See also ==
- Maria Amalia
