= Jacques-Charles Oudry =

French painter (1720–1778)

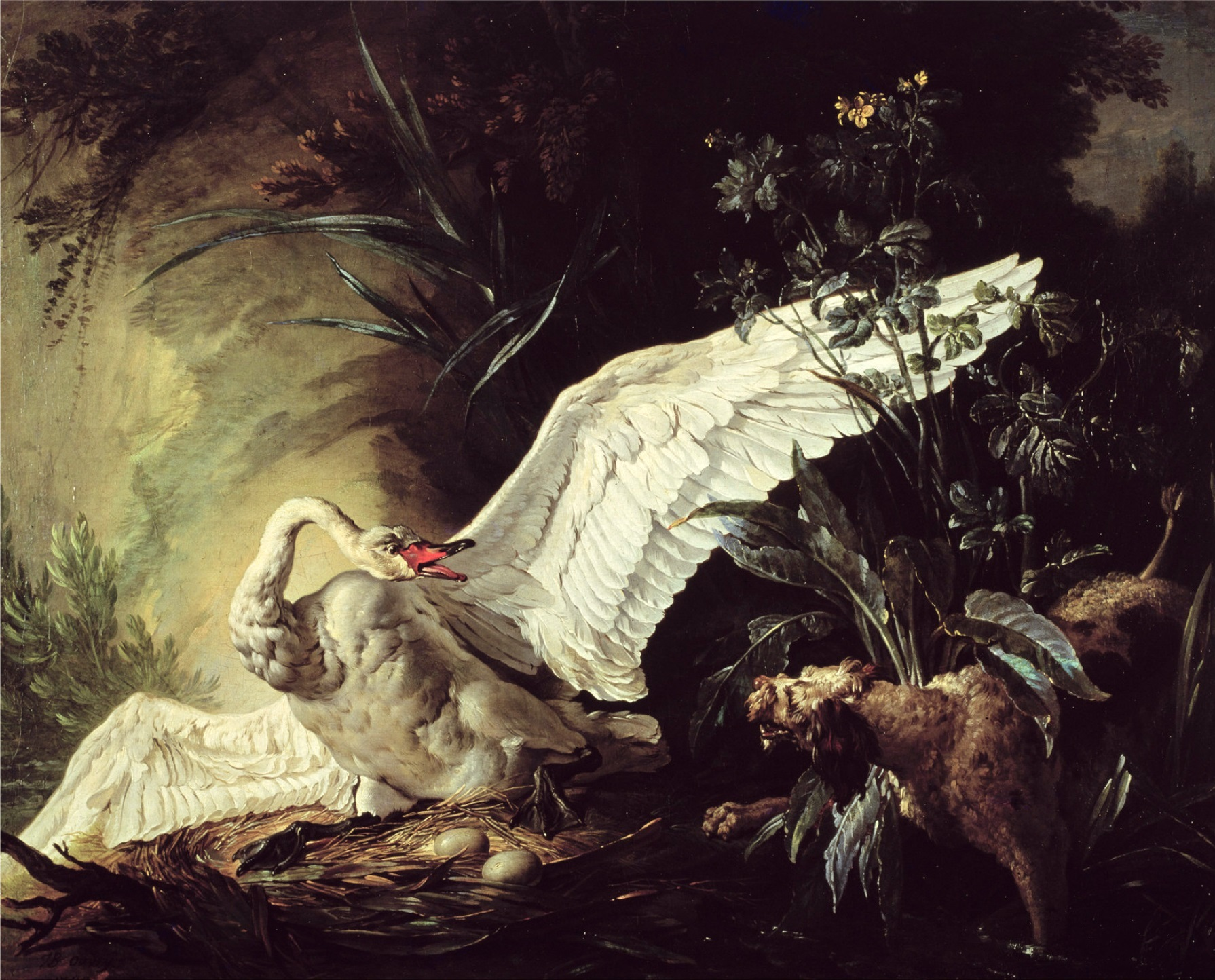
Un chien barbet surprenant un cygne (1740)

Jacques-Charles Oudry (1720–1778) was a French painter.

== Life ==
Born at Paris, the son of two painters, Jean-Baptiste Oudry and Marie-Marguerite Oudry, he was his father's only student. He followed him in subject matter and style, painting hunting scenes on a grand scale. He joined the Académie royale de peinture et de sculpture on 31 December 1748 with his Nature morte de Gibier. He exhibited at the salons of 1748, 1750, 1751, 1757 and 1761. He lived for a long time at the court of Prince Charles Alexander of Lorraine in Brussels. He died in Lausanne.

== Works ==
- Chien barbet surprenant un cygne'', 1740
- Portrait de l'épagneul King Charles, 1752
- Nature morte au gibier, 1762
- Canard colvert accroché à un mur, 1764
- Faisan accroché à un mur, 1764
- Hyène attaquée par trois chiens, 1765
- Chien barbet attaquant un cygne, 1768
- Épagneul à l'arrêt devant deux perdreaux gris, 1768
- Chien et gibier, 1771
- Lièvre mort, 1768
- Oiseaux morts, 1768
- Nature morte au quartier de viande et au pain de sucre, huile sur toile
- Chien qui attrape un canard, huile sur toile
- Chiens dans un paysage avec leur prise, huile sur toile
- Trois léopards
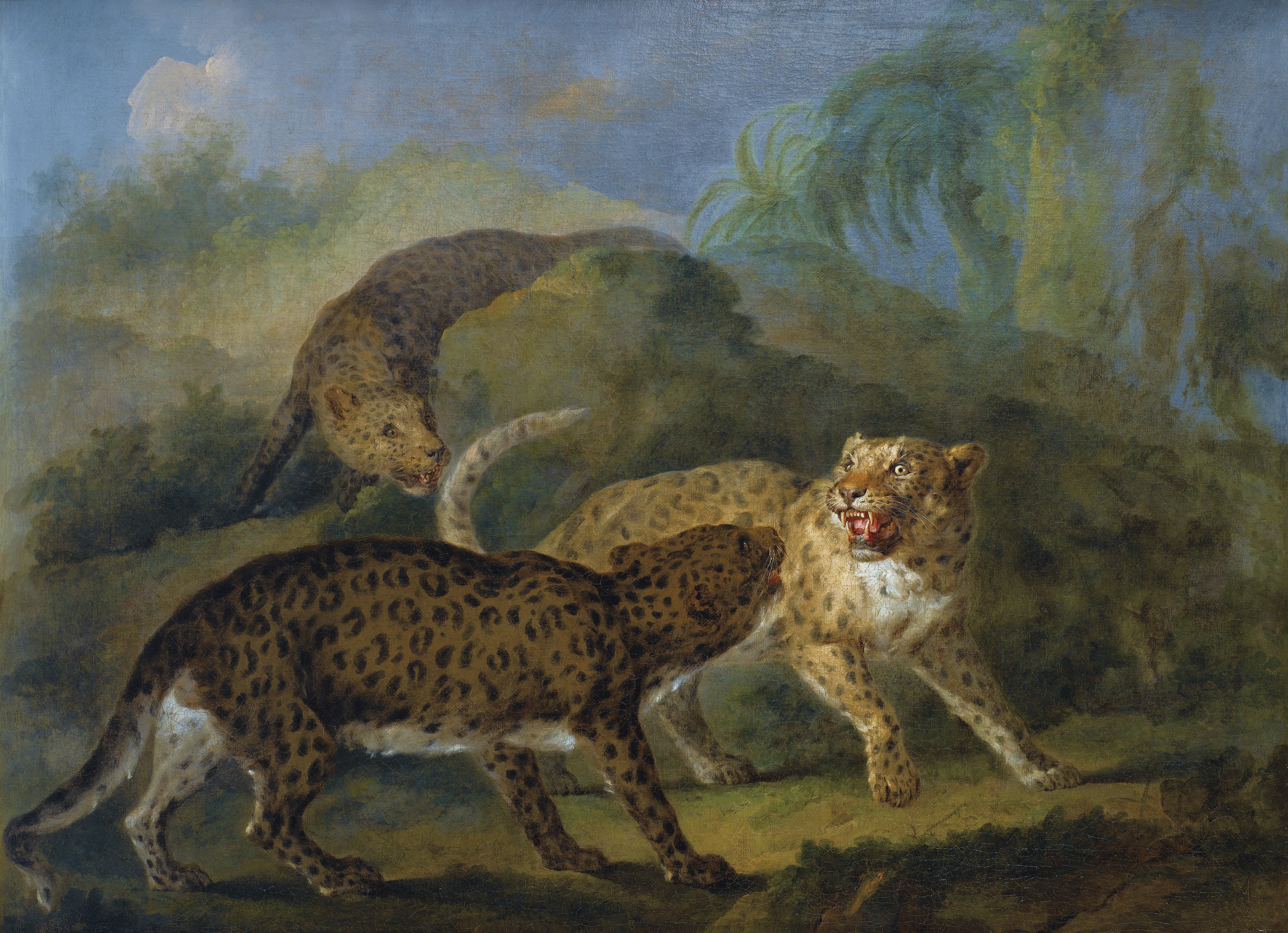
Trois léopards

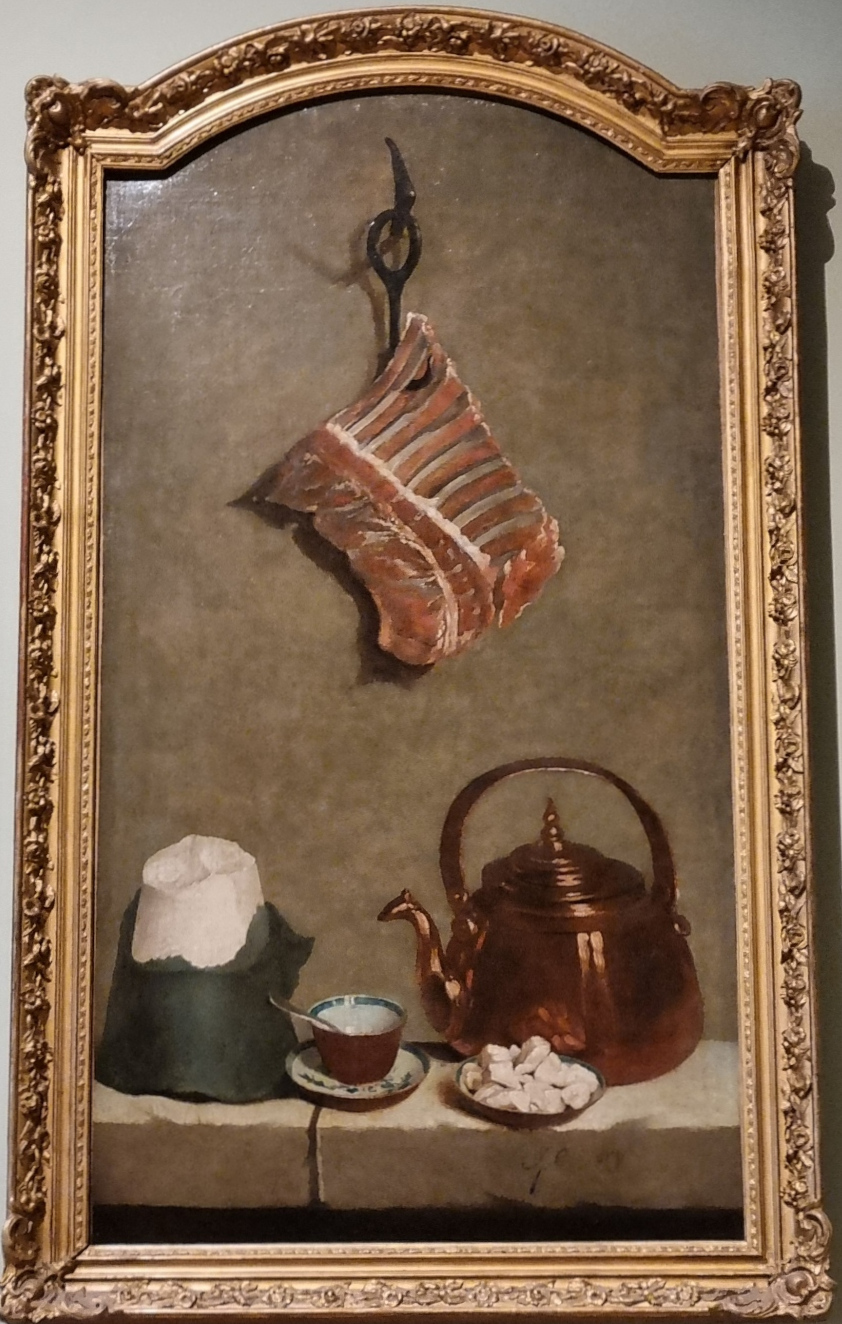
Nature morte au quartier de viande et au pain de sucre, huile sur toile

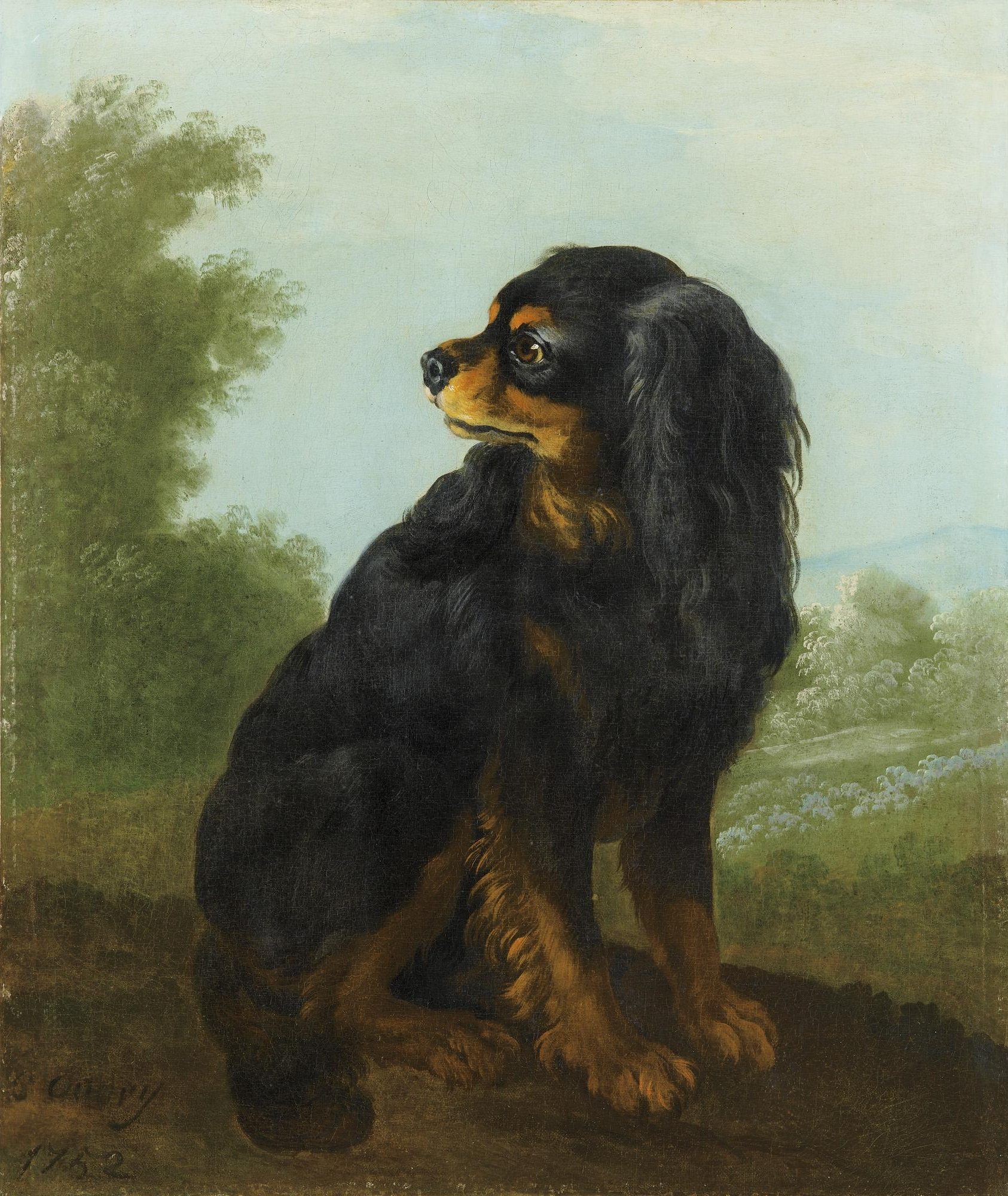
Portrait de l'épagneul King Charles

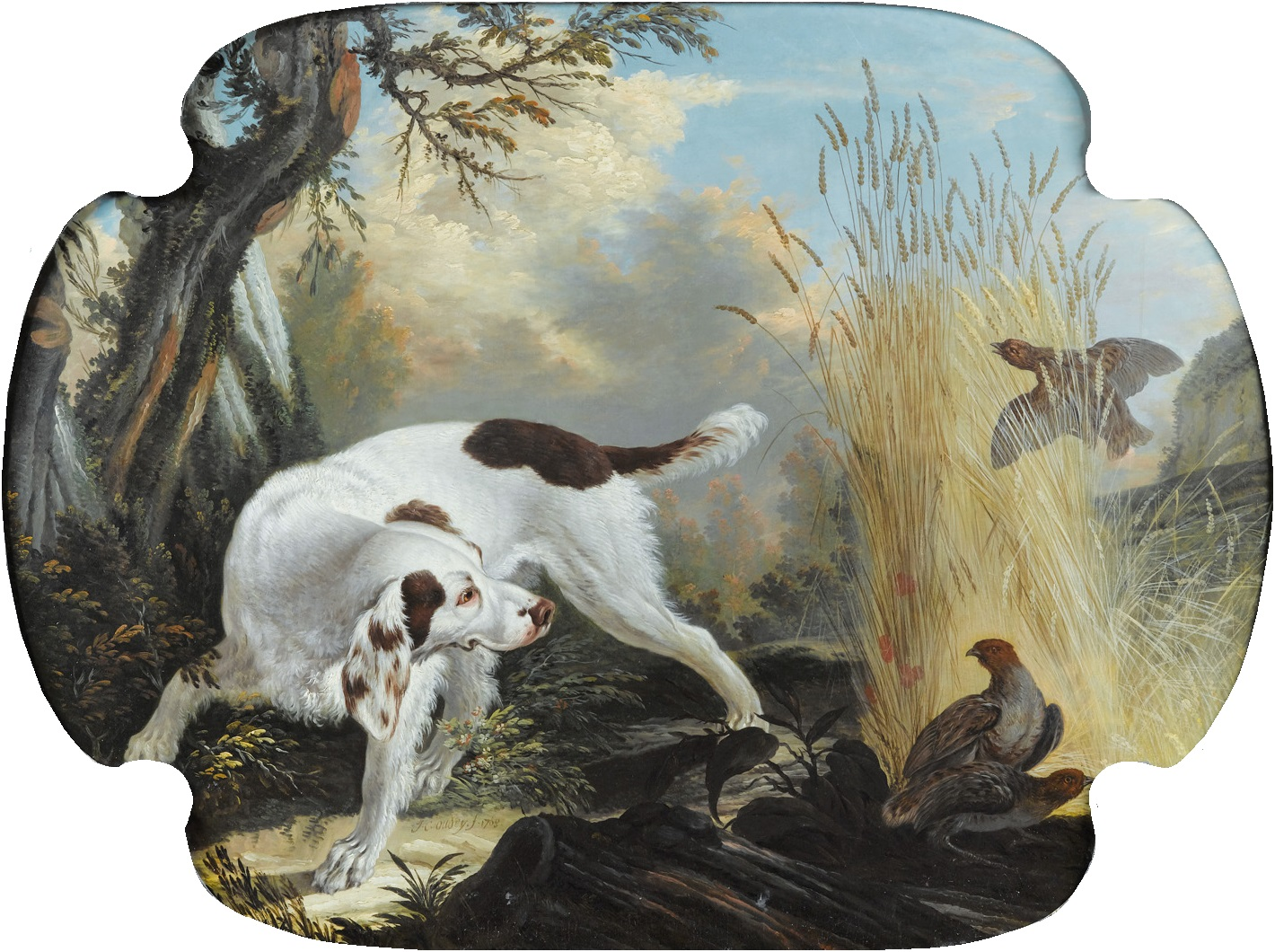
Épagneul à l'arrêt devant deux perdreaux gris
