= André-Marie =

André-Marie or André Marie is a French compound given name. Notable people with the name include:

- André Marie, French Radical politician.
- André Marie Constant Duméril (1774–1860), a French zoologist
- André Marie Jean Jacques Dupin (1783–1865), a French advocate
- André-Marie Ampère (1775–1836), a French physicist
- André-Marie Mbida (1917–1980), the first Prime Minister of pre-independent Cameroon

== See also ==
- André-Jean-François-Marie
- Jean-Marie André
- Marie-Andrée
