= Odette Laguerre =

Odette Laguerre (born Marie-Odette Garin de la Morflan on November 7, 1860, in Constantinople; died September 27 or 29, 1956) was a French feminist activist, teacher, and journalist. She made significant contributions to the fight for women's rights in France at the turn of the 20th century.

== Biography ==
=== Early life and education ===
Daughter of René Louis Charles Garin de la Morflan (1828–1879), a diplomat, and Hélène Henriette Berlot Vaume, Odette Laguerre was born on November 7, 1860, in Constantinople. She grew up in an environment conducive to education and culture. After her father's death in 1878, she became a private tutor while pursuing literary studies at the Sorbonne. In 1881, she obtained a teaching certificate for secondary education for girls.

=== Journalistic career and feminist involvement ===
Laguerre began her journalistic career in 1878 by contributing to La Mode illustrée, where she wrote articles on hygiene, education, and care. Later, in 1903, she joined La Fronde, a feminist newspaper founded by Marguerite Durand, where she regularly published articles. Initially writing weekly for La Fronde, she continued for a year and a half, even after the paper became a monthly supplement due to financial struggles. She also contributed to other newspapers, such as L'Aurore, Les Pages libres, Le Progrès, Le Courrier de l'Ain, and Le Journal des instituteurs.

In 1903, Laguerre founded the Société d’éducation et d’action féministes in Lyon, aiming to educate and empower women through conferences, legal reforms, and mutual aid. The society's activities included creating a solidarity fund for young mothers, launching a women's refuge, and providing free legal consultations for women. They also published 25 brochures, including one by Laguerre on feminism. The society organized popular educational events, fostering a democratic and socialist spirit. By 1906, it had 200 members. After internal conflicts, the society ceased operations in 1909, but Laguerre continued her feminist work, participating in the Bibliothèque féminine in Paris in 1928. She also served as the secretary of the International League of Mothers and Educators for Peace.

In 1947, she was the first woman in her village to vote in the municipal elections.

=== Industry ===
Around 1900, Laguerre became involved in addressing the agrarian crisis in Valromey by opening a small factory to produce horn combs. Her goal was to ensure a comfortable life for her children in the Bugiste region where they had settled. The factory, located in Don, produced combs, pins, and detanglers, initially using celluloid and later horn, which was cheaper and fire-resistant. At its peak, the factory employed up to 150 workers, providing them with better wages and working conditions compared to agriculture in the surrounding areas.

The business expanded, with products exported to Central Europe and Madagascar. However, financial difficulties began around 1911, as export orders became less profitable due to intermediaries controlling the market. The rise of simpler women's fashion and hairstyles during the early 20th century, including the bicycle craze, reduced the demand for combs and pins but increased the need for detanglers.

During the war, the factory was repurposed as a sanatorium for wounded soldiers and soldiers on leave. Despite financial struggles, Odette Laguerre fought to keep the factory open, even selling the Glaron farm and mortgaging their house to cover debts. In 1926, the factory was liquidated, and although they were never officially declared bankrupt, Laguerre and her family faced ruin. The house was sold at auction, leaving barely enough to cover the creditors, and Laguerre moved to Poissy with her family, bringing only her library, piano, and some of her animals.

=== Death ===
She died in September 1956 at the age of 96, and was buried in the cemetery of Artemare.

=== Private life ===
On October 11, 1884, she married Henri-Maxime Laguerre, mayor of Vieu and deputy of Ain. The couple had three children named David-Edouard, Léon-James, and Hélène.

== Works ==
Some of her notable publications include:

- L'Enseignement dans la famille, cours complet d'études pour les jeunes filles (three volumes published between 1888 and 1894).
- Biographies d'hommes illustres, grands patriotes, grands voyageurs, grands inventeurs et récits d'histoire de France (1890).
- Qu'est-ce que le féminisme ? (1905).
- Le droit électoral des femmes (1906).
- La protection de l'enfance (1906), co-written with Ida-Rosette Sée.
- La Révolution au royaume des bonbons (1934), illustrated by Suzanne Theureau.
