= Pierre-Marie =

Pierre-Marie is a French masculine given name, and may refer to:

- Pierre-Marie Carré (born 1947), French prelate of the Catholic Church
- Pierre-Marie Coty (1927–2020), Ivorian Roman Catholic bishop
- Pierre-Marie Delfieux (1934–2013), French Roman Catholic priest
- Pierre-Marie Deloof (born 1964), Belgian rower
- Pierre-Marie Dioudonnat (born 1945), French publisher, historian and political scientist
- Pierre-Marie Dong (1945–2006), Gabonese film director
- Pierre-Marie Dupuy (born 1946), French jurist
- Pierre-Marie Gault de Saint-Germain (1754–1842), French painter
- Pierre-Marie Gerlier (1880–1965), French Cardinal of the Roman Catholic Church
- Pierre-Marie Hilaire (born 1965), Guadeloupean sprinter
- Pierre-Marie Lagrée (1896–1916), French soldier and serial killer
- Pierre-Marie Le Bozec (1769–1830), French naval officer
- Pierre-Marie Paoli (1921–1946), French agent in the Gestapo
- Pierre-Marie Pincemaille (1956–2018), French organist
- Pierre-Marie Poisson (1876–1953), French sculptor
- Pierre-Marie Rudelle (1932–2015), French painter
- Pierre-Marie Taillepied, Comte de Bondy (1766–1847), French politician
- Pierre-Marie Taramarcaz (born 1968), Swiss ski mountaineer
- Pierre-Marie Termier (1859–1930), French geologist
- Pierre-Marie Théas (1894–1977), French Roman Catholic bishop
