= Robert des Acres de L'Aigle =

French politician

Robert, Arthur, Espérance des Acres de L'Aigle
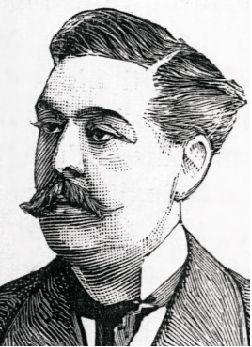
- Portrait of Robert des Acres de L'Aigle
- Born: 23 November 1843; Carlepont, Oise, France
- Died: 14 March 1931 (aged 87); Paris, France
- Occupation: Politician
- Children: Marie-Joseph Charles des Acres de L'Aigle

Robert des Acres de L'Aigle (1843-1931) was a French politician. He served as a member of the Chamber of Deputies from 1885 to 1893.
