= Marie-Victoire =

Marie-Victoire is a feminine compound given name which may refer to:

- Marie-Victoire Davril (1755-1820), French artist
- Marie-Victoire Jaquotot (1772–1855), French painter
- Marie-Victoire de Lambilly (1767–1813), French lawyer, considered the first female lawyer in Brittany and France
- Marie-Victoire Lemoine (1754–1820), French painter
- Marie-Victoire Monnard (1777–1869), French memoir writer
