= Marie-Soleil (given name) =

Marie-Soleil is a feminine compound given name which may refer to:

- Marie-Soleil Beaudoin (born 1982), Canadian soccer referee
- Marie-Soleil Blais (born 1988), Canadian racing cyclist
- Marie-Soleil Frère (1969–2021), Belgian journalism and media researcher
- Marie-Soleil, stage name of Suzanne Pinel, Canadian children's entertainer, star of Marie-Soleil, a children's television show in the 1980s and early 1990s
