= Marie-Andrée =

Marie-Andrée is a French feminine given name. Notable people with the name include:

- Marie-Andrée Bergeron (stage name Ima, born 1978), Canadian singer
- Marie-Andrée Bertrand (1925–2011), French-Canadian criminologist, feminist and anti-prohibitionist
- Marie-Andrée Corneille, Canadian actress
- Marie-Andrée Cossette (1946–2023), Canadian artist
- Marie-Andrée Gill (born 1986), Canadian poet
- Marie-Andrée Leclerc (1945–1984), Canadian serial killer
- Marie-Andrée Lessard (born 1977), Canadian beach volleyball player
- Marie-Andrée Masson (born 1963), Canadian cross-country skier

== See also ==
- Marie-Andrea Egli (born 1989), Swiss footballer
- Jean-Marie André
- André Marie
- André-Marie
