= Marie-Marguerite =

Marie-Marguerite or Mary Marguerite is a feminine compound given names. It may refer to:

- Marie Marguerite Bihéron (1719–1795), French anatomist
- Marie Marguerite Bouvet (1865–1915), American writer of children's books
- Marie-Marguerite Brun (1713–1794), French lexicographer and poet
- Marie-Marguerite Carreaux de Rosemond (1765–1788), French painter
- Marie-Marguerite d'Youville (1701–1771), French-Canadian widow who founded the Sisters of Charity of Montreal, first native Canadian Catholic saint
- Marie-Marguerite Dufay (born 1949), best known as Marie-Guite Dufay, French politician
- Marie Marguerite Françoise Hébert (1756–1794), French ex-nun executed during the Reign of Terror
- Marie-Marguerite Lemaire (1769–1838), Canadian mother superior of the Sisters of Charity of the Hôpital Général of Montreal
- Marie-Marguerite Oudry (1688–1780), French engraver and painter
- Marie Marguerite Rose (c. 1717–1757), Guinean-born Canadian slave
- Marie-Marguerite, Duchess of Anjou or María Margarita Vargas Santaella (born 1983), Venezuelan-born heiress and wife of Louis Alphonse de Bourbon, the Legitimist pretender to the defunct kingdom of France

== See also ==
- Marguerite-Marie Alacoque (1647–1690), French nun and mystic
