= Marie-Catherine =

Marie-Catherine is a feminine compound given name. It may refer to:

- Marie-Cathérine Arnold (born 1991), German rower
- Madame d'Aulnoy (1652–1705), French author, coiner of the name of the literary genre fairy tales
- Marie-Catherine de Beauvilliers (1574–1667), French abbess
- Marie-Catherine Cadière (1709–?), French alleged witch who was tried, acquitted and released
- Marie-Catherine Girod (born 1949), French pianist
- Marie-Catherine Gondi (c. 1500–1570), French court official and trusted confidante of Catherine de Medici, Queen Regent of France
- Marie-Catherine Huot (1791–1869), Canadian nun, superior of the Congregation of Notre Dame
- Marie-Catherine de Maraise (1737–1822), French businesswoman
- Marie-Catherine de Senecey (1588–1677), French courtier
- Marie-Catherine Silvestre (1680–1743), French painter
- Marie-Catherine Vallon (1776–1851), French memoir writer
- Marie-Catherine de Villedieu (died 1683), French writer
- Marie-Catherine Alma Gladys de Zegher Groningen, birth name of Catherine de Zegher (born 1955), Belgian curator and historian

== See also ==
- Marie Catherine or Marie Marguerite Bihéron (1719–1795), French anatomist
- Marie Catherine Fontaine, birth name of Marie Harel (1761–1844), French cheesemaker, co-inventor of Camembert cheese, according to local legend
- Marie Catherine Neal (1889–1965), American botanist and author
- Marie Cathrine Preisler (1761–1797), Danish stage actress
- Marie Catherine Riollet (1755–1788), French engraver
- Marie Catherine Vasa (c. 1670–after 12 December 1672), Polish noblewoman, the legitimized daughter of John Casimir Vasa, former King of Poland and Grand Duke of Lithuania
