= Marie-Joseph =

Marie-Joseph is a compound given name which may refer to:

== Men ==
- Marie-Joseph Charles des Acres de L'Aigle (1875–1935), French politician
- Marie-Joseph Bissonnier (1940–2023), French dental surgeon and politician
- Marie-Joseph Canteloube (1879–1957), French composer, musicologist and author
- Marie-Joseph Chénier (1764–1811), French poet, dramatist and politician
- Marie-Joseph Farcot (1798–1875), French engineer, inventor and manufacturer
- Marie-Joseph Kampé de Fériet (1893–1982), French mathematician
- Marie-Joseph Godefroy de Tonnancour (1786–1850), seigneur and politician in Lower Canada
- Marie-Joseph Lagrange (1855–1938), Dominican priest and founder of the École Biblique in Jerusalem, born Albert Marie-Henri Lagrange
- Marie-Joseph Lemieux (1902–1994), Catholic archbishop and diplomat
- Marie-Joseph Pernock (1897–1975), Martiniquais politician
- Marie-Joseph Peyre (1730–1785), French architect
- Marie-Joseph Alexandre Déodat de Séverac (1872–1921), French composer
- Marie-Joseph Eugène Sue (1804–1857), French novelist

== Women ==
- Marie-Joseph Angélique (c. 1705–1734), Madeira-born black slave in French North America executed for arson

== See also ==
- Marie Joseph, Prince de Caraman-Chimay (1858–1937), Belgian aristocrat and fencer
- Marie Joseph Butler (1860–1940), Irish nun, mother general of the Religious of the Sacred Heart of Mary and founder of Marymount colleges and schools
- Marie Joseph François Garnier (1839–1873), French officer, inspector of Indigenous Affairs of Cochinchina and explorer
- Marie Joseph Max Lohest (1857–1926), Belgian paleontologist and geologist
