= Marie Sophie =

Marie Sophie, Maria Sophia, and other variations may refer to:

- Maria Sophia of Dietrichstein (1646–1711), a German noblewoman
- Sophie Marie of Hesse-Darmstadt (1661–1712), wife of Christian, Duke of Saxe-Eisenberg
- Maria Sophia of Neuburg (1666–1699), queen consort of Portugal as the wife of King Peter II
- Marie Sophie de Courcillon (1713–1756), French salonnière, Duchess of Rohan-Rohan, and Princess of Soubise
- Marie Sophie of Hesse-Kassel (1767–1852), queen consort of Denmark and Norway as the wife of Frederick VI
- Princess Maria Sophia of Thurn and Taxis (1800–1870), wife of Duke Paul Wilhelm of Württemberg
- Maria Sophie of Bavaria (1841–1925), queen consort of the Kingdom of the Two Sicilies as the wife of Francis II
- Marie-Sophie Hindermann (born 1991), German artistic gymnast
- Marie Sophie Hingst (1987–2019), German hoaxer and blogger
- Marie-Sophie L. (born 1963), French actress
- Marie-Sophie Lacarrau (born 1975), French journalist and TV presenter
- Marie-Sophie Nielsen (1875–1951), Danish communist leader
- Maria Sophia Schellhammer (1647–1719), German writer and cook
- Marie Sophie Schwartz (1819–1894), Swedish writer
- Maria Anna Sophia of Saxony (1728–1797), daughter of King Augustus III of Poland
- Maria Sophia Pope (1818–1909), New Zealand shopkeeper and businesswoman
- Marie-Sophie Künkel (born 1992), German politician
- Marie-Sophie Lanig (born 1995), German politician

== See also ==
- Marie (disambiguation)
- Sophie
