= Eugénie Caps =

Religious sister, Catholic Church, France, 20th century

Coordinates: 46°18′39″N 7°31′25″E

Marie-Eugénie Caps "Missionary Sisters of the Holy Spirit"
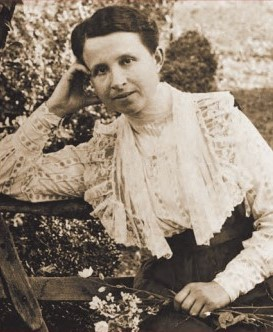
- Eugénie Caps, ca 1920s
- Born: 3 June 1892; Loudrefing, France
- Died: 16 March 1931 (aged 38); Sierre, Switzerland
- Resting place: cemetery of Saint-Maurice-de-Lacques, Montana, Switzerland
- Occupation: sister
- Known for: Founding the Congregation of the Missionary Sisters of the Holy Spirit

Marie-Eugénie Caps (1892–1931) was a French Catholic sister who founded the Congregation of the Missionary Sisters of the Holy Spirit or Spiritaines or Spiritan Sisters in January 1921, at the age of 28.

== Biography ==
=== Early life ===
Eugénie was born on June 3, 1892, in Loudrefing (German: Lauterfingen), then located in German Lorraine, following the outcome of the 1870 Franco-Prussian War. Her father was a railroad employee and her mother was related to Blessed Jean-Martin Moye (1730-1793), a French Catholic priest who served as a missionary in China and was the founder of the Sisters of the Congregation of Divine Providence. The couple had two sons after Eugénie, Camille (1894-1969) and Abel (1907-1972).

Her childhood was spent happily in a very fervent catholic family. She attended the school of the Sisters of the Divine Providence at Saint-Jean-de-Bassel (German: Sankt Johann von Bassel) and very early on, missionary stories exerted a real fascination on her.

The family followed the father's professional transfers: first to nearby Bouzonville (German: Busendorf) (1900) where Eugénie was attending a boarding school. Afterwards, they moved to Ancy-sur-Moselle (German: Ancy an der Mosel) (1906) where her father was station master. Here, Eugénie made her First Communion in 1904 and received the Confirmation in 1906. In Ancy, she learnt office work and took sewing and knitting lessons.

On March 6, 1910, her father suddenly died: the family returned to Bouzonville. As the oldest child, Marie-Eugénie became the household's breadwinner, initially by doing machine knitting works and later by entering at the "Crédit Boulonnais" bank.

In Bouzonville, she re-connected with her class mistresses and friends, who, like her, were attracted to religious life devoted to mission. In 1912, a reading of a text by Archbishop Alexandre Le Roy (1854-1938), from the Congregation of the Holy Spirit, entitled "Je veux être Missionnaire" (English: I want to be a missionary), further strengthened her vocation.

=== First World War ===
The outbreak of WWI in 1914 put on hold any of Marie-Eugénie's plans for religious life. One of her brothers, Camille, was drafted into the German army.

She joined the Red Cross.

On April 25, 1915, after the eucharist, she heard more powerfully than ever the call from God to found a purely missionary religious congregation. Stunned and intimidated, she sought advice from her spiritual guide, the Abbé Jan Eich, the vicar of the parish. He encouraged Eugénie to follow this divine appeal.

At the end of the war, on 12 November 1918, Camille returned home safe and sound, which she interpreted has an evidence that God heard her prayers.

=== Religious life ===
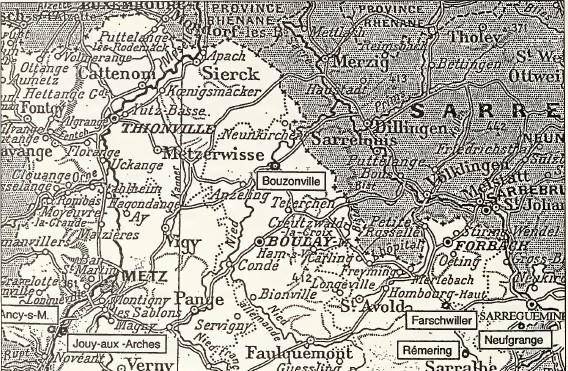
Main sites in Eastern France

At an exhibition on religious missions, Eugénie bought a biography of Father Libermann (1802-1852), founder of the "Society of the Holy Heart of Mary", which merged in 1848 with the Spiritans. The book deeply impressed her.

On October 28, 1919, in the name of her colleagues, she wrote to the Father Superior of the nearby Spiritans convent in Neufgrange:

Nous désirons ardemment fonder en notre chère Lorraine et avant tout pour les Lorraines des deux langues, une congrégation lorraine de Sœurs missionnaires lorraines…

(We ardently desire to found in our dear Lorraine and above all for the Lorraines of the two languages, a Lorraine congregation of missionary Sisters Lorraine…)

In the post-war context, Eugénie knew that young girls would not enter a German religious congregation. Father Clauss, the superior, advised her to broaden her idea, not to limit it to her war-torn departement.

During a year, her spiritual guide, the Abbé Jan Eich, hesitated to push Eugénie's request up to the bishop. Eventually, when Father Clauss announced in 1920 in a letter that the Spiritans had received a substantial bequest for the establishment of a congregation, Abbé Jan Eich agreed to send Eugénie's request.

On October 20, 1920, Eugénie and Abbé Eich met in Paris Alexandre Le Roy, then Superior General of the Spiritans: they agreed on the concept of a Missionary Congregation of the Sisters of the Holy Spirit, supported by the Spiritans. The Bishop of Metz, Jean-Baptiste Pelt, endorsed the request on 2 December. In the same time, a house was purchased in Farschviller to host Eugénie and two other sisters of the nascent movement.

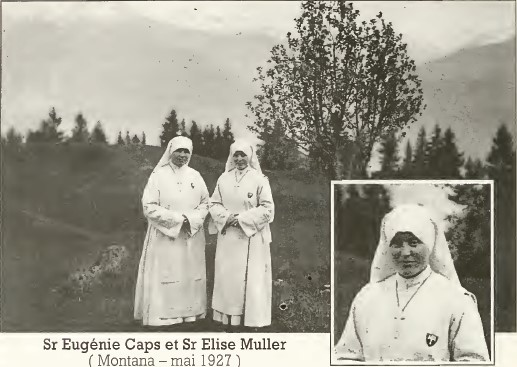
Sisters Eugénie Caps and Elise Muller

On January 6, 1921, the pope Pope Benedict XV blessed the creation of the congregation, then comprising Elise Muller (1901-1970), Lucie Lay and Eugénie Caps. The novelty of this movement was to be entirely devoted to missionnary, not just attached to it.

At the end of 1921, 13 sisters had joined the congregation in Farschviller. To structure the growing entity, Spiritan fathers bought an estate in Jouy-aux-Arches and in March 1922, the nearby convent of Saint-Jean-de-Bassel sent Sister Adeline to organize the congregation, starting from setting up a novitiate structure.

After several months spent with her mother in Bouzonville, Eugénie came back to Saint-Jean-de-Bassel on May 31, 1922. At that time, a new novitiate house opened in Béthisy-Saint-Pierre, near Paris, thanks to the donation of Miss de La Rivière, known by Archbishop Le Roy.

The same archbishop, supported by the Bishop of Metz, submitted to the new Pope Pius XI the rules and organization of the Spiritaines movement: on March 22, 1923, Pope Pius XI signed the canonical erection of the community, less than two years after its foundation.

Soon Marie-Eugénie was nominated as superior of the congregation of Mortain in Normandy (October 1924). Afterwards, she was asked to move to a new community in Allex, southern France (September 1925). Following a short pause in Jouy-aux-Arches, Eugénie moved as superior mother of the budding congregation of Montana, Switzerland in August 1926. There, the sisters were operating a sanatorium, "Villa Notre-Dame".

Eugénie went back to Béthisy-Saint-Pierre to take her first vows on October 5, 1924, and see the first missionary sisters leave to Switzerland, Martinique and Cameroon. Superior General Le Roy was especially thankful to the Spiritaines for replacing German nuns, who had had to leave the Missions of Cameroon and East Africa.

In July 1927, Eugénie took part in the first general chapter of the Spiritan Sisters. On the 27th, Sister Michaël Dufay (1883-1964) was the first elected superior general.

Marie-Eugénie weakening state pushes her in May 1928 to resign from the position of superior of the community in Montana. After many wavering, she took her perpetual vows on October 5, 1930.

On January 18, 1931, Abbé Eich, her longtime spiritual guide died. As far as she was concerned, her health was gradually declining. She was hospitalized in Sierre on March 4. On the 13th, an intestinal occlusion required a surgery. On the 16th morning, the hospital called "Villa Notre-Dame": the Spiritaines superior, Sister Charles, came to assist her. At 11:45 a.m., Eugénie peacefully died.

On March 18, 1931, a funeral service was celebrated at "Villa Notre-Dame" and Sister Eugénie was buried in the cemetery of Saint-Maurice-de-Lacques, Montana.

== Community of the Missionary Sisters of the Holy Spirit ==
The congregation had a new headquarters convent built at via della Camilluccia 591, in Rome in 1958, on a design by architect Silvio Galizia.

In 2023, the Spiritan sisters community comprises 17 nationalities (mainly from French, Portuguese and English speaking areas). They are present on 4 continents:

- Africa (Mozambique, Angola, Cameroon, Cape Verde, Central African Republic, Congo-Brazzaville, Ghana, Guinea Bissau, Nigeria and Senegal);
- Europe (France, Portugal, Netherlands, Germany, Spain and Switzerland);
- America (Haiti, Brazil and Canada);
- Asia (Philippines).

The 100th anniversary of the canonical erection of the Spiritaines community was celebrated in March 2023.

== See also ==
- Portal:Catholic Church
- Congregation of the Holy Spirit

== Bibliography ==
- La Brève Vie d'Eugénie Caps [The Brief Life of Eugenie Caps] (PDF) (in French). Paris: Missionnaires du Saint-Esprit. 2007.
- Fernandes, Josefa Maria (April 1995). Les Sœurs Missionnaires du Saint-Esprit. Histoire d'une fondation [The Missionary Sisters of the Holy Spirit. History of a foundation] (in French). Paris: Missionnaires du Saint-Esprit.
