= Marie-Bernadette =

Marie-Bernadette is a feminine compound given name which may refer to:

- Marie-Bernadette Mbuyamba (born 1993), French basketball player
- Marie-Bernadette Thomas (born 1955), French former footballer

== See also ==
- Marie Bernadette Dette Escudero (born 1978), Filipina politician
- Marie B. Lucas (c. 1875–1935), African-American physician, one of the earliest women to practice medicine in Washington, D.C.
