= Marie-Pauline =

Marie-Pauline may refer to:

- Marie-Pauline Jeuris, birth name of Amandina of Schakkebroek (1872–1900), French Catholic sister, martyr and saint
- Marie-Pauline Martin (1861–1951), French Catholic Discalced Carmelite and prioress
- Soeur (French for "sister") Marie-Pauline, religious name of Pauline Fréchette (1889–1943), Canadian poet, dramatist, journalist, lecturer and Catholic sister

== See also ==
- Marie Pauline Åhman (1812–1904), Swedish harpist
- Marie Pauline Brenner (1906–1978), American Catholic religious educator and sister
- Marie Pauline Révial (1810–1871), French tenor and singing professor
