= Pierre Lagrée =

Executed French serial killer

- Arrest photo
- Born: Pierre-Marie Lagrée; 20 November 1896; Quessoy, France
- Died: 21 August 1916 (aged 19); Rennes Military Prison, rance
- Other name: "L'Américain"
- Status: Executed by firing squad
- Convictions: Murder (4 counts); Attempted murder (2 counts); Theft (2 counts)
- Penalty: Death

Details
- Victims: 4–6
- Span of crimes: 1915–1916
- Country: France (possibly United States)
- States: Normandy, Brittany (possibly New York)
- Date apprehended: 4 December 1915

Pierre-Marie Lagrée (20 November 1896 – 21 August 1916) was a French soldier and serial killer who was court-martialed and later executed for four murders committed in the span of two months between 1915 and 1916. Due to the severity of his crimes, he was compared to infamous spree killer Jean-Baptiste Troppmann.

== Early life ==
Pierre-Marie Lagrée was born on 20 November 1896 in Quessoy, the elder of two sons of a local baker. His early life seemed turbulent, as his father apparently frequently beat him for the smallest offences, causing him to frequently lie and refuse to share his possessions with anyone. Lagrée started stealing at age 7, but this habit of his was only discovered five years later when he was caught trying to steal an eyeglass while working as a shepherd in Lancieux. Incapable of handling his father's aggressive behaviour, he eventually ran away from home at age 15, going to Saint-Malo, where he enlisted as a crewmate on a ship bound for Newfoundland and Labrador, Canada.

Lagrée was frequently made fun of by his workmates, which, coupled with his distaste for the job, caused him to eventually hitch a boat to the coast. After working on two other ships for the next few months, Lagrée got tired of sailing and caught a train for Buffalo, New York, where he started to work as a hotel porter. After earning a decent salary, he moved to Cincinnati, Ohio for a short period, before finally settling to work as a farm hand in Arcade. Around this time, the First World War broke out, and Lagrée's mother started sending him numerous letters, begging him to return home and fight for the homeland. Lagrée begrudgingly accepted and returned to Quessoy, where the locals nicknamed him "L'Américain" (literally The American) due to his fashion style and American accent. He was enlisted as an infantryman at the 1st Colonial Infantry Division, and was considered an honourable soldier by his commander. Despite this, Lagrée was dissatisfied with army life and his meagre 35 franc salary, causing him to resort to asking his mother for more money. After she refused, he decided to resort back to stealing, and if need be, kill anyone who stood in his way.

== Murders ==
Photograph of Lagrée during his time in the military

Near the end of 1914, Lagrée was stationed in Tot-de-Bas, a small village near the seaside commune of Fermanville, where he became the bunkmate of 21-year-old private Édouard Bitel. A clockmaker by profession, Bitel always carried a small bag full of francs around his neck, which attracted Lagrée's attention. As he knew his friend's habits, on 1 December 1915, Lagrée invited Bitel for a drink at a local bar. After having several drinks, he lured Bitel out into an open field, where he hit him with a bottle on the head, causing him to fall down. While Bitel attempted to get up, Lagrée grabbed a club and struck him on the head, killing him instantly. He then stole the bag and went back to the garrison. Bitel's body was soon found by locals, and an autopsy determined that the soldier had been killed by a blunt instrument, likely by a fellow conscript. Authorities determined that before he had used the club, the killer had also hit him with a bottle, which likely made cuts on the perpetrator's hand. As a result, all soldiers from the nearby garrison were examined and questioned, but by then, Lagrée was on leave and unable to be examined. He later used Bitel's money to pay for alcohol and cigarettes.

In order to avoid possible capture, Lagrée returned to Quessoy, ostensibly to notify Bitel's family of his unfortunate death. Pretending to be his friend, he offered them a picture of their son and to be a pallbearer at the funeral; at the said funeral, Lagrée behaved oddly, doing elaborate gestures and proclaiming loudly that he would "deal with" Édouard's killers if he ever saw them again. On 3 January 1916, he went to the house of an acquaintance he planned to rob - a Mrs. Monvieux, who was preparing dinner for her two children, 8-year-old Marie and 4-year-old Joseph. Angered by his conduct at the funeral, Monvieux slapped him. Fearing that she would denounce him to the authorities, Lagrée viciously brutalized her to the point that she died from her injuries. After noticing that both children had seen the grizzly scenario, he took out his knife and ran after them. He first caught up with Marie and slit her throat, before chasing down Joseph and doing the same to him. After washing his clothes, Lagrée then rifled through the house, stealing 50 francs and leaving the premises.

== Arrest, trial and execution ==
Unbeknownst to him, Lagrée was seen leaving the residence by several locals. When the crime scene was discovered on the next day, they immediately notified Inspector Le Gall, claiming that they had last seen the 19-year-old Lagrée, a notorious thief with a bad reputation, exiting the household on the night of the crime. Upon the Inspector's orders, Lagrée was arrested and interrogated; during the interrogation, authorities noticed what appeared to be washed bloodstains on his clothes and scratches on his face. Believing that they had caught their culprit, he was imprisoned in Saint-Brieuc until it could be decided whether Lagrée would be tried before a civilian or military court.

Immediately after his arrest, theories emerged that he also might be Bitel's killer. While Lagrée readily confessed to the Monvieux murders, he initially denied culpability in the former's killing. When queried about the Monveiux killing, Lagrée calmly and without emotion recounted that his sole reason was theft, and that he regretted killing the children. In April 1916, it was decided that he would be tried in a military court, after which Lagrée was transported to the military prison in Rennes. His trial was scheduled for 25 July.

While he was incarcerated at the Rennes Military Prison, Lagrée attempted to escape on 16 July by overpowering the two guards watching over him, Redon and Le Bourdonnec, stabbing the latter with his own bayonet in the stomach. However, Le Bourdonnec's cries of pain alerted other guards, who came in and immediately subdued the convict. Both soldiers later recovered from the attempted attack, and two counts of attempted murder were added to Lagrée's future trial.

During his trial, much to the spectators' shock, Lagrée calmly recalled the details of both crime scenes when questioned by the magistrate. Questions regarding his sanity were raised, but the attending psychiatrists testified that the defendant was well aware of what he had done and had no remorse. Lagrée was found guilty and sentenced to death, to which he reportedly showed no emotion when his death warrant was read out.

On 21 August 1916, Pierre Lagrée was executed by firing squad at the Rennes Military Prison, with more than a hundred people attending the event. When asked by the rapporteur, Capt. Dauvillier, whether he wanted to make a final statement, Lagrée confessed to committing two additional murders while residing in New York, before begging for forgiveness from the French people, God, and his regiment. He also requested that he not be blindfolded during the execution, but this request was not granted.

== See also ==
- Jean-Baptiste Troppmann
- List of French serial killers
