= Marie-Luce =

Marie-Luce is a French feminine compound given name. It may refer to:

- Marie-Luce Brasier-Clain (born 1959), French politician
- Marie-Luce Penchard (born 1959), French politician
- Marie-Luce Romanens (born 1973), Swiss orienteer
- Marie-Luce Waldmeier (born 1960), French alpine skier

== See also ==
- Marie-Lucie, another given name
