= Marie-Pierre =

Marie-Pierre is a compound given name which may refer to:

== Women ==
- Marie-Pierre Arnaud-Lindet (1936–2018), French historian
- Marie-Pierre Arthur, stage name of Canadian pop singer-songwriter Marie-Pierre Fournier
- Marie-Pierre Casey (born 1937), French actress
- Marie-Pierre Castel (1949–2013), French actress
- Marie-Pierre Duros (born 1967), French runner
- Marie-Pierre Gagné (born 1983), Canadian synchronized swimmer
- Marie-Pierre Gatel (born 1968), French alpine skier
- Marie-Pierre Guilbaud (born 1963), French cross-country skier
- Marie-Pierre Lamarche (born 1968), Canadian speed skater
- Marie-Pierre Langlamet (born 1967), French harpist
- Marie-Pierre Leray (born 1975), French figure skater
- Marie-Pierre Parent (born 1982), Canadian biathlete
- Marie-Pierre Pruvot (born 1935), Algerian-born French transgender woman
- Marie-Pierre Rixain (born 1977), French politician
- Marie-Pierre Vedrenne (born 1982), French politician
- Marie-Pierre Verhaegen (born 1966), Belgian historian

== Men ==
- Marie-Pierre Kœnig (1898–1970), French general
