= Marie-Chantal =

Marie-Chantal or Marie Chantal is a feminine compound given name. Its bearers include:

== People ==
- Marie-Chantal, Crown Princess of Greece (born 1968), born Marie-Chantal Claire Miller
- Marie-Chantal Chassé (born 1966), Canadian entrepreneur, engineer and politician, former Minister of the Environment
- Marie-Chantal Croft (born c. 1969), Canadian architect
- Marie-Chantal Depetris-Demaille (1941–2025), French foil fencer
- Marie Chantal Nijimbere (born 1983), Burundian politician, Minister of National Defence and Veterans Affairs
- Marie-Chantal Perron (born 1967), Canadian actress and fashion designer
- Marie Chantal Rwakazina, Rwandan diplomat and politician
- Marie-Chantal Toupin (born 1971), Canadian singer

== Fictional characters ==
- the title character of Marie-Chantal contre le docteur Kha, a 1965 spy film, and in stories by Jacques Chazot on which the film is based
