= Marie-Jeanne (disambiguation) =

Marie-Jeanne (1920–2007) was an American ballet dancer.

Marie-Jeanne may also refer to:

== People ==
- Marie Jeanne Bécu, Comtesse Du Barry (1743–1793), mistress of Louis XV of France
- Marie-Jeanne Bernard (1909–1979), Luxembourgian swimmer
- Marie-Jeanne Bozzi (1955–2011), Corsican politician and convicted criminal
- Marie-Jeanne Brillant (1724–1775), French actress
- Marie Jeanne Clemens (1755–1791), French-Danish artist
- Marie Jeanne Frigard (1904–unknown), French chess master and classical violinist
- Marie-Jeanne L'Héritier (1664–1734), French writer and salonnière
- Marie-Jeanne de Lalande (1768–1832), French astronomer and mathematician
- Marie-Jeanne Lamartinière (fl. 1802), Haitian soldier
- Marie-Jeanne Larrivée Lemière (1733–1786), French soprano
- Marie-Jeanne de Mailly (1747–1792), French dame d'atour to Queen Marie Antoinette
- Marie-Jeanne Meyer (born 1942), French billionaire
- Marie-Jeanne Musiol (born 1950), Swiss-Canadian photographer
- Marie-Jeanne Renard du Bos (1701–before 1750) French engraver
- Marie Jeanne Riccoboni (1713–1792), French actress and novelist
- Marie-Jeanne Roland (1754–1793), French revolutionary, salonnière and writer
- Marie Jeanne Romanée (1769–1846), French painter
- Marie Jeanne Baptiste of Savoy-Nemours (1644–1724), Princess, Duchess, then Regent of Savoy

== Other uses ==
- "Marie-Jeanne" (song), a 1990 song by Michel Sardou
- "Marie-Jeanne", a 1967 song by Joe Dassin
