= Marie-Jo =

Marie-Jo is a feminine compound given name which may refer to:

== People ==
- Marie-Jo Bonnet (born 1949), French historian and lesbian feminist Marie-Josèphe Bonnet
- Marie-Jo Lafontaine (born 1950), Belgian sculptor and video artist
- Marie-Jo Pelletier (born 1997), Canadian former ice hockey player
- Marie-Jo Thério (born 1965), Canadian actress and musician
- Marie-Jo Thiel (born 1957), French theologian, medical doctor, and professor of ethics
- Marie-Jo Zarb, French lyricist, director and producer
- Marie-Jo Zimmermann (born 1951), French politician

== Fictional characters ==
- Marie-Jo Cotin, a main character in A Very Secret Service, a French television series which aired from 2015 to 2018
- the protagonist of Marie-Jo and Her Two Lovers, a 2002 French film
