= Marie-Théodore =

Marie-Théodore is a masculine compound given name which may refer to:

- Marie-Théodore Périgot (1807–1888), French divisional general and governor of the province of Constantinois
- Marie-Théodore Ratisbonne (1802–1884), French Jewish convert to the Catholic Church who became a priest, missionary and founder of the Congregation of Our Lady of Sion
- Marie-Théodore de Rumigny (fl. 1827–1831), French ambassador
