= Marie-Nicole =

Marie-Nicole is a feminine compound given name which may refer to:

- Marie-Nicole Lemieux (born 1975), Canadian contralto opera singer
- Marie-Nicole Vestier (1767–1846), French painter

== See also ==
- Marie Nicole d'Oliva (1761–1789), French prostitute, memoirist and a participant in the famous fraud known as the Affair of the Diamond Necklace
- Marie Nicole, a pen name of Marie Ferrarella (born 1948), American romance novelist
