= Marie-Agnès Courty =

French geologist

Marie-Agnès Courty is a French geologist of the CNRS who works at the European Centre for Prehistoric Research, in Tautavel (Pyrénées-Orientales).

She has theorised that the impact of an object (asteroid or comet) of around 1 km in diameter hit the Earth, in the Southern Hemisphere close to the Kerguelen Islands around 4000 years ago (around 2350 BC). This cataclysm led to a great deal of incandescent material, which could explain myths such as the Apocalypse and Sodom and Gomorrah. She arrived at this conclusion after discovering pockets of earth dating from this era that had been heated to more than 1500 °C in a number of areas, notably in Syria and France. A series of chevrons point toward a spot in the middle of the Indian Ocean where newly discovered Burckle crater, 18 miles in diameter, lies 12,500 feet below the surface.

This thesis has been criticized by other scientists because of the absence of craters and of iridium in the pockets of land from this time.

Critics have not provided adequate data showing that all impacts contain iridium and other metals such as higher proportions of nickel or other heavier metals may also be proposed alternatives for distinct proof of an impact signature.
