= Marie-Rosalie =

Marie-Rosalie is a feminine compound given name which may refer to:

- Rosa Bonheur (1822–1899), French painter and sculptor born Marie-Rosalie Bonheur
- Marie Rosalie Bertaud (1738–early 19th century), French engraver
- Marie-Rosalie Cadron-Jetté (1794–1864), Canadian midwife and founder of the Congregation of the Sisters of Misericorde, being considered for sainthood by the Catholic church
- Marie-Rosalie Lamorlière (1768–1848), French domestic servant, last servant of Queen Marie Antoinette
