= Marie-Gabrielle =

Marie-Gabrielle or Marie Gabrielle is a feminine compound given name. It may refer to:

- Marie-Gabrielle Capet (1761–1818), French painter
- Marie-Gabrielle Ménard, Canadian politician elected in 2025
- Marie Gabrielle Mfegue, Cameroonian cultural journalist
- Marie-Gabrielle Trézel (died 1794), one of the Martyrs of Compiègne, Catholic martyr saint
- Duchess Marie Gabrielle in Bavaria (1878–1912)
- Princess Marie-Gabrielle of Luxembourg (1925–2023)
