= Marie-Geneviève =

Marie-Geneviève is a feminine compound given name borne by:

- Marie-Geneviève Bouliard (1763–1825), French painter
- Marie-Geneviève Dupré (1711–1783), French actress
- Marie-Geneviève Halévy (1849–1926), French salonnière and wife of composer Georges Bizet
- Marie-Geneviève Hérault (c. 1655–c. 1712), French painter
- Marie-Geneviève Martin (1814–1862), birth name of Marie Recio, French opera singer and second wife of composer Hector Berlioz
- Marie-Geneviève Meunier (1765 or 1766–1794), French nun, martyred Catholic saint as one of the Martyrs of Compiègne
- Marie-Geneviève Navarre (1737–1795), French portrait artist and miniaturist

== See also ==
- Marie Geneviève Radix de Sainte-Foy (1729–1809), French noblewoman, a temporary mistress of both King Louis XV and his son Louis, Dauphin of France
