= Marie-Soleil Frère =

Belgian researcher (1969–2021)

Marie-Soleil Frère (1969 – 19 March 2021) was a Belgian journalism and media researcher. An expert on the media in Francophone Africa, she was remembered in one obituary as a "gifted academic giant".

== Life ==
Frère was born in Canada. She gained her degree from the Université libre de Bruxelles and became maître-assistant at the University of Ouagadougou.

At the time of her death Frère was Senior Research Associate at the National Fund for Scientific Research in Belgium and Professor at the Université libre de Brussels.

She died on 19 March 2021.

== Books ==
- The Media and Conflicts in Central Africa. 2007.
- Elections and the Media in Post-conflict Africa: Votes and Voices for Peace. 2011. ISBN 9781780320182
- Politics and Journalism in Francophone Africa: Systems, Practices and Identities. 2022.
