= Marie-Aimée =

Marie-Aimée is a feminine compound given name. Notable persons bearing the name include:

- Marie-Aimée de Kermorvan (1904–1985), Mauritian writer and poet
- Marie-Aimée Lebreton (born 1962), French writer
- Marie-Aimée Lullin (1751–1822), Swiss entomologist
- Marie-Aimée Roger-Miclos (1860–1951), French pianist
