= Angélique Allais =

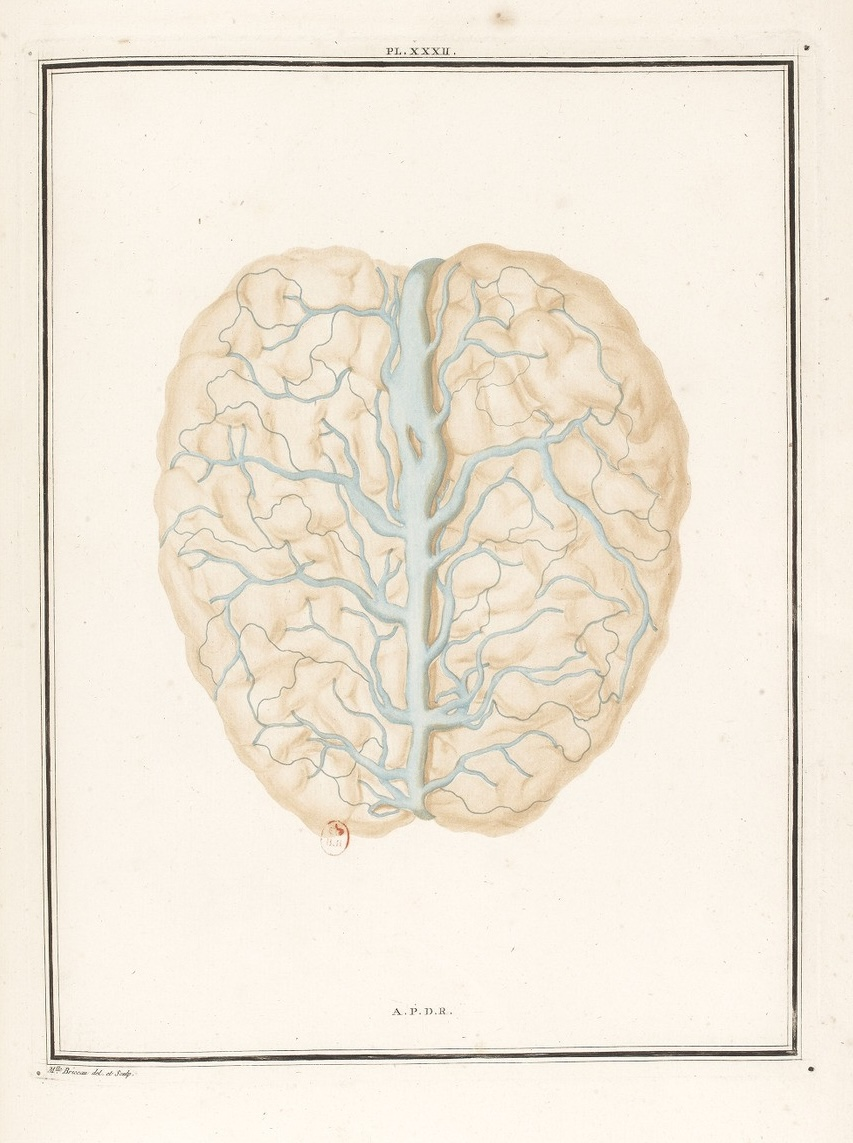
An illustration from Vicq-d'Azyr's Traité d'anatomie et de physiologie, by Briceau-Allais

Marie-Angélique Briceau-Allais (1767–1827) was a French engraver active during the late Enlightenment and the French Revolution. Trained in her family workshop, she became known as one of the foremost crayon engravers in France of the late 18th century. Her work includes anatomical plates for Félix Vicq-d’Azyr’s Traité d’anatomie et de physiologie, as well widely circulated portraits of leading figures of the Revolution.

== Early life and training ==
Marie-Angélique Briceau was born on 24 May 1767 in Paris, the daughter of Suzanne Porcher and the painter and engraver Pierre-Claude Briceau. She received her artistic training within her family, following a common practice among engravers of the time. The Briceau studio was situated on rue Aubri-le-Boucher, near the historic printmaking neighbourhood of rue Montorgueil.

By the age of 20 Briceau-Allais was an established printmaker, and a number of sources suggest that around this time she was awarded the title peintre du roi (Painter of the King).

Briceau-Allais married the engraver Louis-Jean Allais in November 1790. Together they had a large number of children, several of whom went on to pursue artistic careers. In addition to her own work, she trained a number of students, including her children Jean Alexandre Allais and Jeanne Augustine Allais, and the Academy member Jean-Pierre Granger.

She died on 21 August 1827 at her home at 14 rue de la Bûcherie.

== Anatomical engraving ==
In 1786, Briceau-Allais produced her earliest known work, engraving 16 of the 69 plates for Félix Vicq-d’Azyr's medical reference work, Traité d’anatomie et de physiologie. Her plates were signed “Mlle Briceau del. et sculp.”, indicating that she both drew (delineavit) and engraved (sculpsit) the images herself, while the remaining 53 plates were signed by her father.

Briceau-Allais's engravings focused on the human brain and other anatomical subjects, demonstrating a remarkable attention to detail and technical precision. The plates combined etching, stipple, and aquatint, techniques more commonly associated with portraiture. Some images required multiple layers and hand-colouring, resulting in a delicate, lifelike effect reminiscent of watercolours.

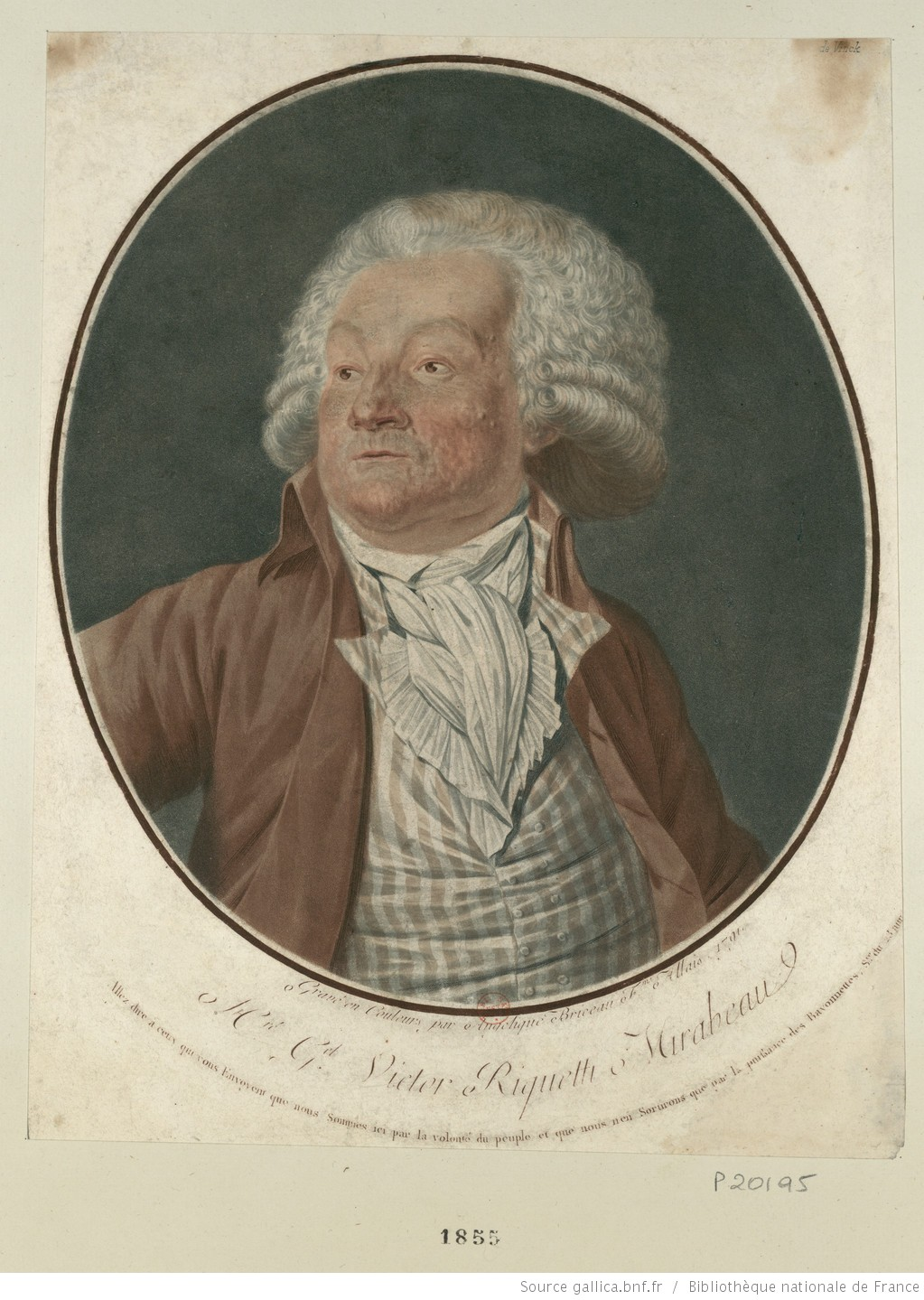
Mirabeau portrait by Angélique Birceau-Allais

As part of the project, Briceau-Allais also made preparatory drawings for future prints, including a study of the clavicle of a hare. These works reveal her careful observation of musculature and skeletal structure, most likely observed from life. Vicq-d'Azyr wrote to Angélique's father thanking him for the work and for the "endurance of foul odours".

== Coloured portrait engraving ==
Angélique Briceau later specialised in coloured line engravings. She created portraits of revolutionary figures including Jean-Paul Marat, Jean-Jacques Rousseau, Joseph Barra, and Agricola Vialla. These works, usually in large oval medallions, were noted for their delicate colouring and melodramatic expression.

She also produced commemorative prints for revolutionary events, such as Les Vingt-cinq préceptes de la raison, dated 28 October Year II (1794), which included allegorical figures and columns of text designed by the draughtsman Grasset de Saint-Sauveur.Beyond political subjects, she created coloured views of gardens and decorative placards, considered more suited to women artists of her time.
