= Marie-Félicité =

Marie-Félicité is the compound given name of:

- Marie-Félicité Brosset (1802–1880), French historian and orientalist
- Marie-Félicité de Saint-Maxent (1755–c. 1800), French-Creole noblewoman and wife of Bernardo de Gálvez, the 5th Spanish governor of New Orleans
