= Marie-Odile Marceau =

Canadian architect

- Education: Architecture
- Alma mater: Laval University
- Occupation: Architect
- Organization: McFarland Marceau Architects Ltd.
- Website: www.mmal.ca

Marie-Odile Marceau is a Canadian architect and partner at McFarland Marceau Architects Ltd. Marceau's career in both the public and private sectors emphasizes sustainability and community centered design. Throughout her career, Marceau has specialized in institutional and recreational facilities, and has received numerous awards for her contributions to sustainable architecture and Indigenous community design.

== Background ==
Marceau is a Canadian architect who earned her degree from Laval University in Quebec City. Early in her career, Marceau worked in construction in northern Quebec. She later moved to Yellowknife, Northwest Territories to take a position in the Public Works Department. During her time working in northern Canada, Marceau was engaged with native communities, subsequently working for the federal government as the Regional Architect in the Department of Indian Affairs and Northern Development in Vancouver British Columbia.

== Early career ==
In Vancouver, Marceau worked as the Regional Architect for the British Columbia Native Schools Program between 1985–1993. During this time, she actively engaged with Indigenous communities, working collaboratively with them during the design development process. Marceau's collaborative, client-driven design approach propelled the program to garner national acclaim for the projects it generated, including Lalme' Iwesawtexw (Seabird Island) Elementary School by Patkau Architects (1991). The federally funded program brought a new approach to institutional and First Nations design in British Columbia. Marceau's role as Regional Architect prioritized quality design and community collaboration in the design process, engaging high-profile architecture firms in the province. Marceau then went on to start Marceau-Evans Johnson Architects in 1993, an architectural practice dedicated to the design of Indigenous school buildings. The practice continued to expand until 2008, primarily focusing on Indigenous institutional buildings in British Columbia.

=== Marceau-Evans Johnson Architects Completed Works ===
- 1998- Nadleh Koh School
- 1998- Kitasoo School Expansion
- 1998- Aatse Davie School
- 1999- Stellaquo Community Hall
- 2003- Quatsino Band School
- 2004- Salmo Secondary School
- 2004- McLeod Lake Natural Ice Arena
- 2005- Tachek Community School

== McFarland Marceau Architects Ltd. ==
In 2008, Marceau partnered with Larry McFarland to open McFarland Marceau Architects Ltd. in Vancouver British Columbia. The practice specializes in institutional and recreational buildings with an emphasis on sustainable design. The use of local materials, namely wood, is emphasized in the structural and formal expression of the firm's works.

== Select projects ==
=== Seabird Island School [as client] ===
The Seabird Island Elementary School, completed in 1991 by Patkau Architects, was a project facilitated under Marceau's supervision as Regional Architect for the British Columbia Native Schools Program. The school is located in Agassiz, British Columbia and serves the northern Coast Salish community. The design and program allocation of the building is expressive of the natural landscape and traditional practices. The school responded to the community's cultural practices, and used local materials to engage the Coast Salish community in the design process. The project received several awards, including the Governor General's Award, Lieutenant Governor's Medal in Architecture, the Canadian Wood Council Honour Award and the Canadian Architect Award of Excellence.

=== Gulf Islands Operations Centre ===
The Gulf Islands Operations Centre, designed as an administrative building for the National Reserve, is the first building in Canada to receive LEED platinum certification. The saw-tooth roof is reflective of the mountainous landscape, and allows ample daylight into the building. All orientations have been designed for proper sun exposure and shading. The centre received the Award of Excellence in Green Building Design from the Royal Architectural Institute of Canada in 2007.

=== BlueShore Financial Environmental Learning Centre ===
The BlueShore Financial Environmental Learning Centre is located in Paradise Valley British Columbia, situated in a federally designated land reserve. The design of the school recognizes the value of the surrounding landscape, and seeks to make it an outdoor classroom. The building was awarded LEED platinum certification and the Holcim Award of Acknowledgement for Sustainable Construction. The building has also won the Canadian Architect Award of Excellence-Merit, Lieutenant- Governor of British Columbia- Architectural Institute of British Columbia, Western Red Cedar, Canadian Wood Council + Woodworks.

== Publications ==
- 2012- Journal of Housing and the Built Environment: A participatory process for the design of housing for a First Nations Community

== Memberships ==
- Royal Architectural Institute of Canada, Fellow
- LEED Accredited Professional
- Architect, AIBC
