= Maria Amalia =

Maria Amalia may refer to:

- Maria Amalia of Courland (1653–1711), princess of Courland from the Ketteler family
- Maria Amalia of Nassau-Dillenburg (1582–1635), royal of the House of Nassau
- Maria Amalia of Naples and Sicily (1782–1866), Queen of the French from 1830 to 1848, consort to Louis-Philippe I
- Maria Amalia of Saxony (1724–1760), princess of Saxony, Queen Consort of Spain and Naples as wife of Charles III
- Maria Amalia, Duchess of Parma, (1746–1804), born Archduchess of Austria, by marriage Duchess of Parma, Piacenza and Guastalla
- Maria Amalia, Holy Roman Empress (1701–1756), born Archduchess of Austria, the daughter of Joseph I, Holy Roman Emperor, wife of Charles VII, Holy Roman Emperor
- Archduchess Maria Amalia of Austria (1780–1798), daughter of Emperor Leopold II

== See also ==
- María Amalia Lacroze de Fortabat (1921–2012), Argentine executive and philanthropist
- Maria Amalia Mniszech (1736–1772), Polish-Saxon noblewoman and lady-in-waiting
- Maria Amália Vaz de Carvalho (1847–1921), Portuguese writer and poet
- Melina Mercouri (born Maria Amalia Mercouri, 1920–1994), Greek actress, singer, and politician
