= Marie-Charles =

Marie-Charles is a compound given name. It may refer to:

- Marie-Charles du Chilleau (1734–1794), French general and colonial administrator
- Marie-Charles Damoiseau (1768–1846), French astronomer
- Marie-Charles David de Mayréna (1842–1890), eccentric French adventurer
