= Marie-Francine (given name) =

Marie-Francine is a feminine compound given name. Notable persons bearing the name include:

- Marie-Francine Hébert (born 1943), Canadian author
- Marie-Francine Moens (born 1957), Belgian computer scientist
