= Le Courrier de l'Ain =

Local French newspaper published from 1821 to 1944

Le Courrier de l'Ain was a French newspaper published in Bourg-en-Bresse from 1821 to 1944.

== History ==
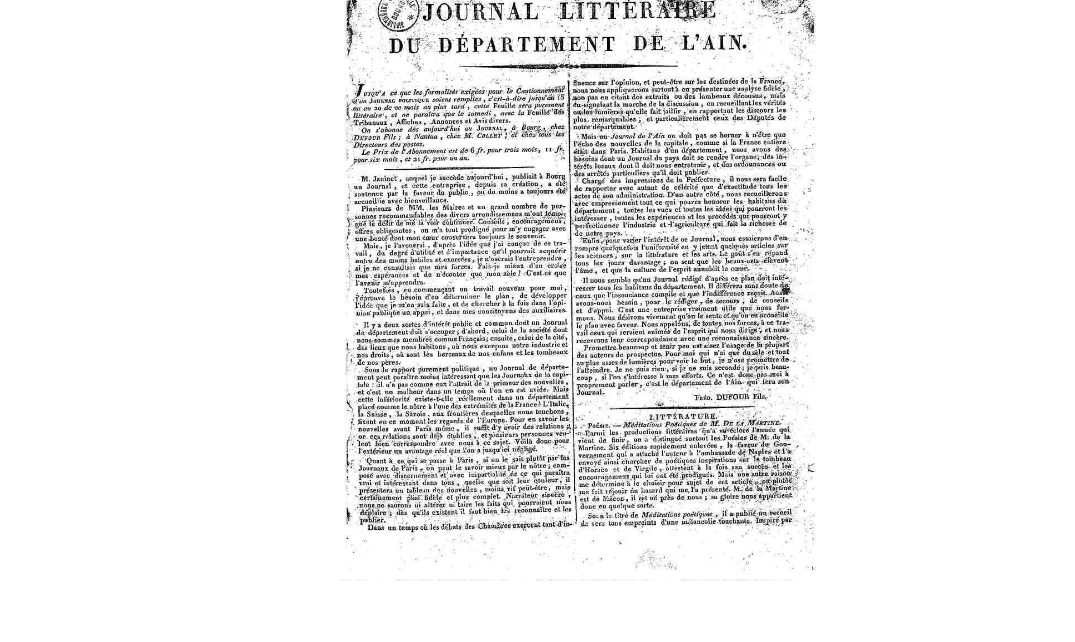
Front page of the first issue of the newspaper Le Courrier de l'Ain, dated February 3, 1821

Le Courrier de l'Ain was founded in 1821 by Frédéric Dufour. The newspaper started out as a literary newspaper, then became a political and literary newspaper.

During the early years of the Third Republic, all political perspectives were represented in Ain's press. Le Courrier de l'Ain, the most significant daily newspaper in the department, maintained a moderate stance. By the early 20th century, the newspaper is under the leadership of Alexandre Bérard. During World War I, the newspaper increased its publication frequency, sometimes releasing multiple daily editions to keep the population informed about the conflict's developments. In 1932, Alfred Fabre-Luce became the primary shareholder. It remained the only daily newspaper in the department until its closure in 1944.
