= Marie-Ernestine =

Marie-Ernestine is a feminine compound given name. Notable people bearing the name include:

- Marie-Ernestine Juillard (1885–1963), French World War I heroine
- Marie-Ernestine Serret (1812–1884), French painter

== See also ==
- Marie Ernestine Lavieille (1852–1937), French painter
- Maria Ernestine Walsh-Held (1881–1973), Swiss botanist and entomologist
