= Marie-Victoire Monnard =

French memoir writer

Marie-Victoire Monnard (1777–1869), was a French memoir writer. She is known for her memoirs, describing her life during the French Revolution.

She was born near Creil, in Picardy. She was the apprentice of a hatmaker in Paris. Her memoirs describe a number of events in Paris during the revolution, such as the Insurrection of 10 August 1792 and September Massacres, and belong to the few written by non-aristocratic women of the period, and perhaps the only one by a working class woman.
