= Marie-Catherine Vallon =

Marie-Catherine Vallon (1776–1851), was a French memoir writer. She is known for her memoirs, describing her life during the French Revolution. Her memoirs describe her imprisonment with her father in Orleans and Blois during the Reign of Terror. She was the daughter of a royalist clerk in Blois. Her memoirs belong to the few of a non-aristocratic women during the revolution.
