= Marie-Joseph Charles des Acres de L'Aigle =

French politician

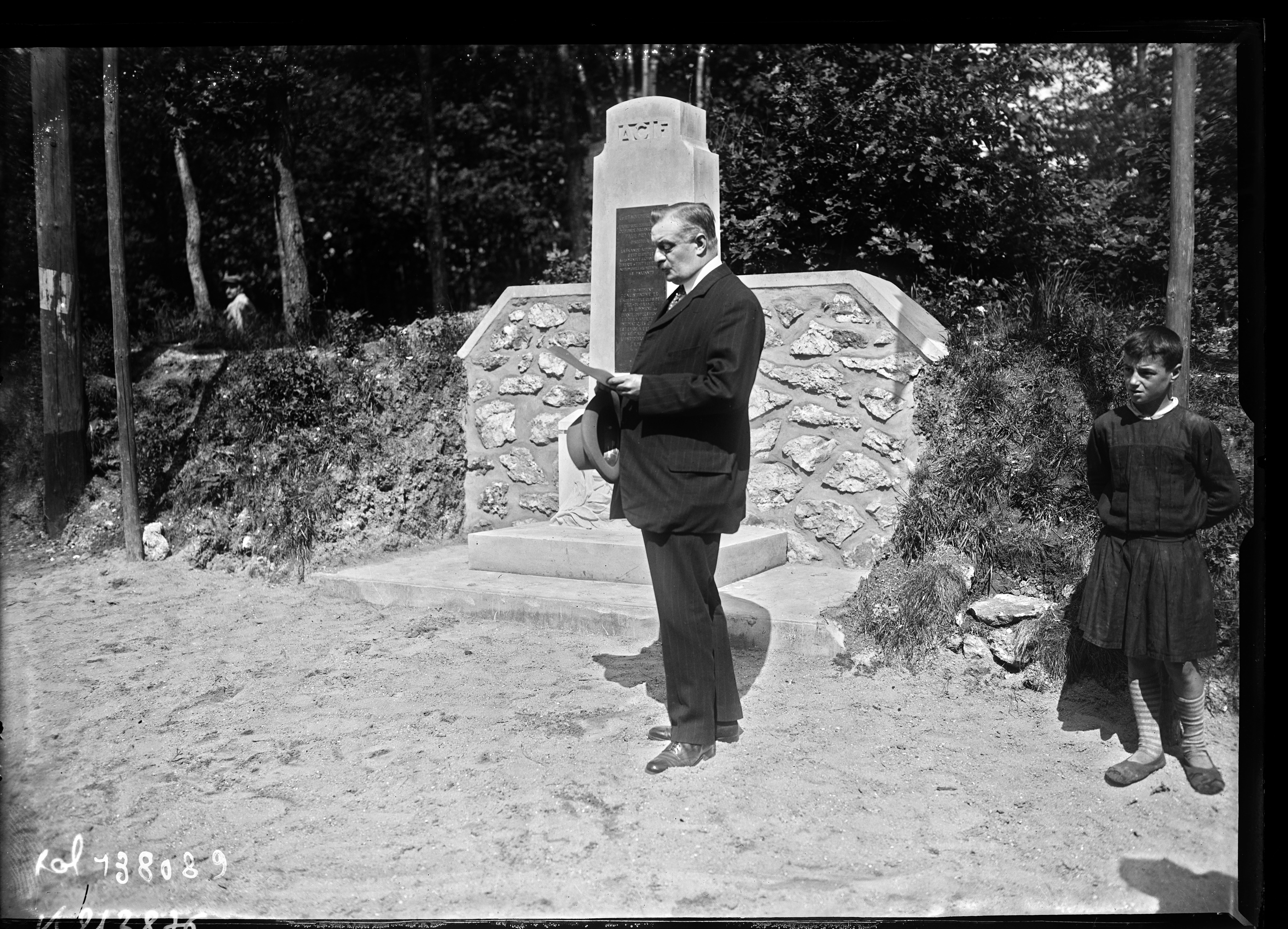
- Born: 7 November 1875; Paris, France
- Died: 11 September 1935 (aged 59); Neuilly-sur-Seine, France
- Occupation: Politician
- Parent: Robert des Acres de L'Aigle

Marie-Joseph Charles des Acres de L'Aigle (7 November 1875 – 11 September 1935) was a French politician. He served as the mayor of Rethondes from 1908 to 1935. He also served as a member of the Chamber of Deputies from 1932 to 1935, representing Oise.

He was a direct descendant of the King Louis XV through the monarch's illegitimate son Charles de Vintimille du Luc.
