= Marie-Alphonse =

Marie-Alphonse is a masculine compound given name which may refer to:

- Marie-Alphonse Ratisbonne (1812–1884), French Jew who converted to Christianity, Jesuit priest and missionary, co-founder of the Congregation of Our Lady of Sion
- Marie-Alphonse Dain (1896–1964), French Hellenist and Byzantinist
- Marie-Alphonse Sonnois (1828–1913), French Catholic bishop and archbishop

== See also ==
- Marie Alphonse Bedeau (1804–1863), French general and minister
- Alphonse-Marie, another given name
