= Jacques-Marie =

Jacques-Marie or Jacques Marie may refer to:

- Jacques-Marie, vicomte Cavaignac (1773–1855), French general
- Jacques Marie (footballer) (1945–1999), French footballer
- Jacques-Marie d'Amboise (1538–1611), French hellenist
- Jacques-Marie Beauvarlet-Charpentier (1766–1834), French organist and composer
- Jacques-Marie Deschamps (1750–1826), French playwright, librettist and writer
- Jacques-Marie Huvé (1783–1852), French architect
- Jacques-Marie Le Père (1763–1841), French civil engineer
- Jacques-Marie Rouzet (1743–1820), French politician
