= Marie-Léontine =

Marie-Léontine is a feminine compound given name which may refer to:

- Marie-Léontine Bordes-Pène (1858–1924), French pianist
- Marie-Léontine Tsibinda (born 1958), writer and poet from the Republic of the Congo
