= Marie-Cécile =

Marie-Cécile is a feminine compound given name which may refer to:

- Marie-Cécile Collet, French-Seychellois lawyer and politician in office from 1948 to 1950
- Marie-Cécile Gros-Gaudenier (born 1960), French alpine skier
- Marie-Cécile Morice (1947–2024), French politician
- Marie-Cécile Naves, French sociologist and political scientist
- Marie-Cécile Zinsou (born 1982), French-Beninese art historian and entrepreneur
