= Marie-Clementine =

Marie-Clementine is a feminine compound given name which is borne by:

- Marie-Clementine Bagration (1810–1829), illegitimate daughter of Prince Klemens von Metternich and Princess Catherine Bagration
- Marie-Clémentine Anuarite Nengapeta (1939–1964), born Anuarite Nengapeta, Congolese Catholic martyr, first Bantu Catholic to be beatified
- Marie-Clémentine "Suzanne" Valadon (1865–1938), French painter

== See also ==
- Marie Clémentine Dusabejambo (born 1987), Rwandan filmmaker
