= Marie-Lucie =

Marie-Lucie is a feminine compound given name. It may refer to:

- Marie-Lucie Morin, Canadian public official, lawyer, and former diplomat
- Marie-Lucie Tarpent (born 1941), French-born Canadian linguist

== See also ==
- Marie-Luce, another given name
