= Alphonse-Marie =

Alphonse-Marie is a primarily masculine compound given name. Bearers of the name include:

- Alphonse-Marie Bérenger (1785–1866), French lawyer and politician
- Alphonse-Marie Eppinger (1814–1867), born Elisabeth Eppinger, French Catholic nun and founder of the Sisters of the Divine Redeemer
- Alphonse-Marie Kadege, Burundian politician and former Vice-President of Burundi
- Alphonse-Marie Parent (1906–1970), Canadian priest, educator and academic administrator

== See also ==
- Alphonse Marie Fons Rademakers (1920–2007), Dutch actor, director, producer and screenwriter
- Mary Barr Mackinlay (1910–1974), also known as Sister Alphonse Marie, Australian Dominican sister
- Marie-Alphonse, another given name
