= Marie-Michèle =

Marie-Michèle is a feminine compound given name. Notable persons of that name include:

- Marie-Michèle Desrosiers (born 1950), Canadian pop and rock singer
- Marie-Michèle Gagnon (born 1989), Canadian former alpine ski racer
- Marie-Michèle Rey (1938–2019), Haitian politician
