= Marie-Julie =

Marie-Julie is a compound given name. Notable people with the name include:

- Marie-Julie Baup (born 1979), French actress, writer and comedian
- Marie-Julie Bonnin (born 2001), French pole vaulter
- Marie-Julie Dallaire, Canadian film director
- Marie-Julie Halligner (1786–1850), French opera singer
- Marie-Julie Jahenny (1850–1941), Breton woman considered by some to be a mystic and stigmatist

== See also ==
- Marie Julie Clary (1771–1845), wife of Joseph Bonaparte, and as such first Queen of Naples, then of Spain and the Indies
- Marie-Anne-Julie Forestier (1782–1853), French painter
- Julie-Marie, another compound given name
