= Marie-Charlotte =

Marie-Charlotte is a feminine compound given name. Persons bearing the name include:

- Marie-Charlotte de Balzac d'Entragues (c. 1588–1664), French noblewoman and mistress to King Henry IV of France
- Marie-Charlotte Garin (born 1995), French politician
- Marie-Charlotte Léger (born 1996), French footballer
- Marie-Charlotte Pascal (1749–1821), wife of French banker Claude-Nicolas Perier, many of whose children attained influential positions

== See also ==
- Marie Charlotte Blanc (1833–1881), German socialite and businesswoman, operator of the Monte Carlo Casino
- Marie Charlotte of East Frisia (1689–1761), by marriage Countess of Kriechingen, as well as Lady of Püttlingen
- Marie Charlotte Fayanga (1946–2021), Central African diplomat and politician
- Marie Charlotte Hippolyte de Saujon (1725–1800), French woman of letters and salon hostess, by marriage Countess of Boufflers
- Marie Charlotte Schaefer (1874–1927), early Texas physician and the first woman to become a faculty member of the University of Texas Medical Branch
- Marie Charlotte de La Tour d'Auvergne (1729–1763), French noblewoman
- Marie Charlotte de La Trémoille (1632–1682), French noblewoman, by marriage Duchess of Saxe-Jena
