= Marie-Annick =

Marie-Annick

- Marie-Annick Yannick Bellon (1924–2019), French film director, editor and screenwriter
- Marie-Annick Dézert (1972–2019), French handball goalkeeper
- Marie-Annick Duchêne (born 1940), French politician
- Marie-Annick Lépine, multi-instrumentalist with the Canadian folk rock band Les Cowboys Fringants
