= Elmarie =

Elmarie is a feminine given name.

== People with the given name ==
- Elmarie Fredericks (born 1986), Namibian footballer
- Elmarie Gerryts (born 1972) South African pole vault athlete
- Elmarie Linde, South African politician
- Elmarie Wendel (1928–2018), American actress and singer

== See also ==
- El Mariel
