= Marie-Dominique =

Marie-Dominique is a unisex compound given name which may refer to:

- Marie-Do Aeschlimann (born 1974), French politician
- Marie-Dominique Chenu (1895–1990), French priest and theologian
- Marie-Dominique Lelièvre, French writer and journalist
- Marie-Dominique Philippe (1912–2006), French philosopher and theologian

== See also ==
- Marie Dominique Luizet (1852–1930), French botanist and chemist
