= Marie-France Morin =

Canadian ice hockey player

- Born: March 22, 1976 (age 50) Gloucester, Ontario, Canada
- Height: 5 ft 4 in (163 cm)
- Weight: 145 lb (66 kg; 10 st 5 lb)
- Position: Goaltender
- Caught: Left
- Played for: Ottawa-Nepean Raiders; Russell Invaders; Saint-Isidore Eagles; National Capital Raiders; Ottawa Raiders; Brampton Thunder
- National team: Canada
- Playing career: 1998–2002

Marie-France Morin (born March 22, 1976) from Gloucester, Ontario is a former member of the Canadian national women's hockey team. She also competed with the Ottawa Raiders in the National Women's Hockey League.

== Early life ==
She attended high school at Collège catholique Samuel-Genest, a French Catholic high school in Ottawa where she won the Ottawa High School Athletic Association Tier II junior basketball championship.

== Playing career ==
=== Minor and Bantam Hockey ===
In 1985 while playing as a goalie on a boys team in the North Gloucester Minor Hockey Association, the Ottawa District Hockey Association briefly barred her participation based on the later-overturned Supreme Court of Ontario ruling blocking 8-year old Justine Blainey from playing on a Metro Toronto Hockey League team. She was the only girl in the league.

In 1992 at the age of 16 she played goal, leading the Ottawa-Nepean Raiders to win the Ontario women's bantam A hockey championships.

=== Junior Hockey ===
In 1991, while playing for in Gloucester Midget A, she was selected in the 10th round of the annual Central Junior A Hockey League draft by the Gloucester Rangers, an Ottawa-based Junior A men's team. making her the first women ever drafted in the league. In 1995 she was playing for both the Russell Invaders senior B women's team (who won the Ontario Women's Hockey Association, defeating Sudbury in the final with Morin in goal) and the Saint-Isidore Eagles in the men's Eastern Ontario Junior C Hockey League. She played for the Saint-Isidore Eagles until 1998.

In summer 1995 she played for the Ottawa Selects in an under-18 tournament against the United States United States women's national under-18 ice hockey team.

=== Professional Hockey ===
She joined the newly formed National Capital Raiders of the National Women's Hockey League for their first season in 1998. The team was renamed to the Ottawa Raiders the following year, and she played through 2002, appearing in a March 2002 quarter-final win against the Montreal Wingstar.

=== Canadian National Women's Hockey Championship ===
She competed in the 2002 Canadian National Women's Hockey Championship on loan to the Brampton Thunder, the Ontario host team. She was selected as the team's player of the game, in both the March 6, 2002 match against the Beatrice Aeros and in the March 9 semi-final loss against Team Quebec. She stopped 24 shots leading Brampton to the bronze medal, beating Alberta 5 to 1.

=== Canada women's national ice hockey team ===
Called up to Canada in September 1999, following an audition of 30 goalies in May 1999, Morin's first game for Canada was in a February 2, 2000 4-1 loss to the United States game in Buffalo, New York. She also played for Canada, winning a gold medal at the 2000 4 Nations Cup, including a shut-out in a 9-1 match against Sweden.

== Career stats ==
Year	Event	Games	Minutes	GA	GAA	Saves	Sv %
2000	Exhibition vs. US	1	60	4	4.00		
2000	4 Nations Cup	2	120	2	1.00	37	.949
