= Marie-Paule =

Marie-Paule is a feminine compound given name which may refer to:

- Marie-Paule Blé (born 1998), French taekwondo practitioner
- Marie-Paule Cani (born 1965), French computer scientist
- Marie-Paule Alice Courbe (1845–1894), pseudonym Gisèle d'Estoc, French writer, sculptor and feminist
- Marie-Paule Foppossi (born 1998), French basketball player
- Marie-Paule Gnabouyou (born 1988), French handball player
- Marie-Paule Kieny (born 1955), French virologist and science writer
- Marie-Paule Malliavin (1935–2019), French mathematician
- Marie-Paule Miller (born 1968), French deaf sprinter and heptathlete
- Marie-Paule Pileni (born 1945), French physical chemist
- Marie-Paule Serve (born 1941), New Caledonian politician
- Marie-Paule Van Eyck (born 1951), Belgian fencer
