= Marie-Georges =

Marie-Georges (or Marie-George) is a French feminine given name. Notable people with the name include:

- Marie Georges Humbert (1859–1921), French mathematician
- Marie-Georges Pascal, French actress (1946–1985)
- Marie-George Buffet, French politician (born 1949)
