= Marie-Pier =

Marie-Pier is a feminine compound given name which may refer to:

- Marie-Pier Beaudet (born 1986), Canadian archer
- Marie-Pier Boudreau Gagnon (born 1983), Canadian synchronized swimmer
- Marie-Pier Lafontaine, Canadian writer
- Marie-Pier Pinault-Reid (born 1988), Canadian rugby union player
- Marie-Pier Préfontaine (born 1988), Canadian alpine skier
