= Jean-Marie André =

Jean-Marie André (born 31 March 1944, in Charleroi, Belgium and deceased 3 January 2023, in Namur, Belgium) was a Belgian scientist and professor of Theoretical and Chemical Physics at the Facultés Universitaires Notre-Dame de la Paix (now, University of Namur) in Belgium. He made important contributions to polymer chemistry. In 1984, he was awarded the Medal of the International Academy of Quantum Molecular Science (IAQMS), and in 1991, he was awarded the Francqui Prize on Exact Sciences. He was a member of the IAQMS.
