= Marie-Marguerite Oudry =

French artist (1688–1780)

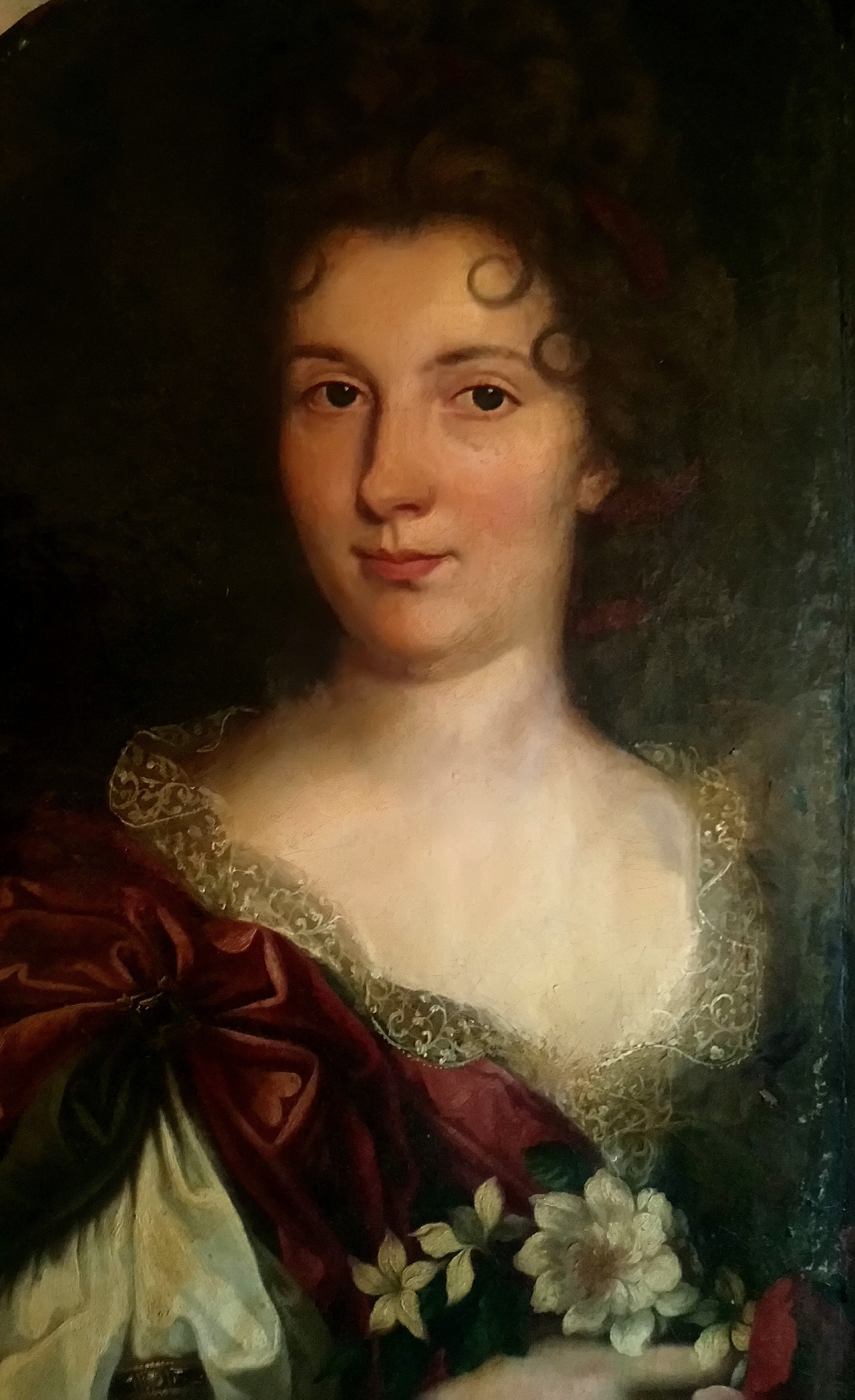
Portrait of Marie–Marguerite Oudry by Jean-Baptiste Oudry

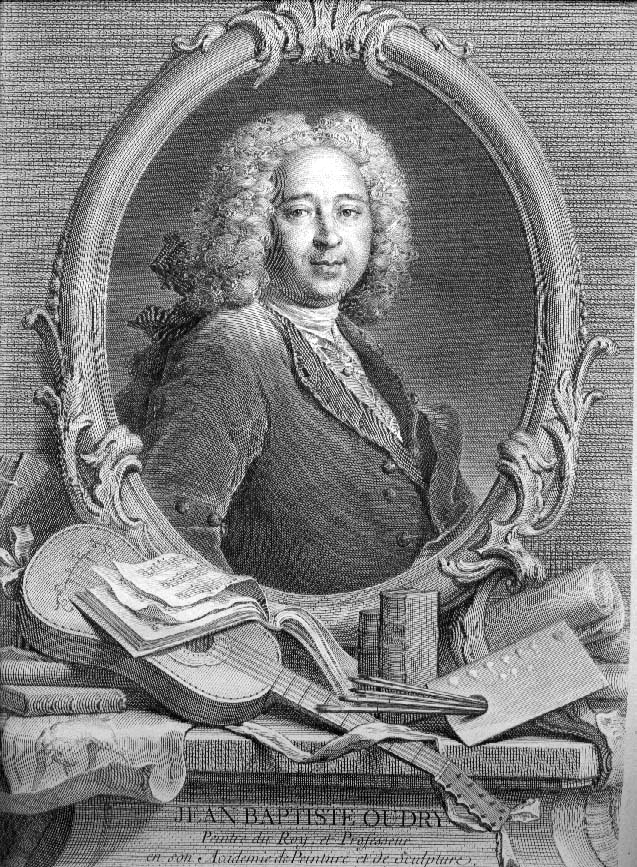
Engraving by Marie–Marguerite Oudry after Nicolas de Largillière: Portrait of Jean-Baptiste Oudry

Marie-Marguerite Oudry, née Froissé (1688–1780) was a French engraver and painter.

Born in Paris, Oudry studied with Jean-Baptiste Oudry, whom she married in 1709. The couple would have thirteen children, only five of whom, two sons (including Jacques-Charles Oudry) and three daughters, were still alive at the time of her death. Their daughter married the painter Antoine Boizot. Marie–Marguerite Oudry produced engravings after her husband's paintings; she also produced portraits in pastel of him and of one of their sons. She died of an illness in her Paris home.
