= Maria Sophia Pope =

Maria Sophia Pope (1818–1909) was a New Zealand shopkeeper and businesswoman.

== Biography ==
She was born in London, England in 1818.
