= List of people with given name Marie =

This is a list of notable individuals named Marie.

== * ==
- Marie Antoinette (1755–1793), Queen of France and Archduchess of Austria
- Marie of Lusignan, Queen of Aragon (1273–1319)
- Marie Henriette of Austria (1836–1902), Queen of the Belgians
- Marie, Duchess of Auvergne (c. 1375–1434), suo jure Duchess of Auvergne and Countess of Montpensier
- Princess Marie of Baden, Duchess of Anhalt (1865–1939), the last duchess of Anhalt
- Marie Clotilde Bonaparte (1912–1996), French princess of the Bonaparte dynasty
- Marie de Bourbon (disambiguation)
- Princess Marie of Denmark (born 1976), second wife of Prince Joachim of Denmark
- Marie of Edinburgh (1875–1938), Queen consort of Romania
- Marie Thérèse of France (1778–1851), daughter of Marie Antoinette and King Louis XVI, Queen of France according to some, and Duchess of Angoulême
- Marie de Lorraine, Duchess of Guise, also Princess of Joinville
- Princess Marie of Hohenzollern-Sigmaringen (1845–1912), also Countess of Flanders
- Marie Leszczyńska (1703–1768), Queen of France as the wife of King Louis XV
- Marie de' Medici (1575–1642), Queen of France and Navarre
- Marie of Orléans (1865–1909), French and Danish princess
- Marie Louise, Duchess of Parma (1791–1847), Empress of the French
- Maria Pavlovna, Grand Duchess of Saxe-Weimar-Eisenach (1786–1859), daughter of Tsar Paul I of Russia
- Grand Duchess Maria Pavlovna of Russia (1890–1958)
- Marie of Romania (1875–1938), last queen consort of Romania
- Marie of Savoy (disambiguation)
- Marie Adélaïde of Savoy, Dauphine of France
- Marie Jeanne Baptiste of Savoy-Nemours, Duchess of Savoy
- Marie of Saxe-Altenburg (1818–1907), Queen of Hanover

== A ==
- Marie Aarestrup (1826–1919), Norwegian artist
- Marie Abts-Ermens (1767–1853), Belgian seamstress
- Marie Adam-Doerrer (1838–1908), Swiss women's rights activist and unionist
- Marie Adams (1925–1998), American singer
- Marie Adelaide (disambiguation)
- Marie Christiane Agathe, Mauritian politician elected in 2022
- Marie Agba-Otikpo (1948–2021), Central African Republic politician
- Marie Ahlers (1898–1968), German politician
- Marie Albe (1924–2021), French actress and journalist
- Marie al-Khazen, Lebanese photographer
- Marie Allan (born 1979), French actress
- Marie Allard (1742–1802), French ballerina
- Marie Alvarado-Gil (born 1973), American politician
- Marie Amachoukeli (born 1979), French film director and screenwriter
- Marie Anaut (born 1956), French clinical psychologist
- Marie Anderson (1916–1996), American newspaper editor
- Marie Henri Andoyer (1862–1929), French astronomer and mathematician
- Marie Andree-Eysn (1847–1929), Austrian botanist
- Marie Andrews (born 1940), Australian politician
- Marie Angel (artist) (1923–2010), British illustrator and calligrapher
- Marie Angel (soprano) (born 1953), Australian opera singer
- Marie Angliviel de la Beaumelle (1963–2013), French-Italian glass maker
- Marie Angélique Arnauld (1591–1661), French Cistercian abbess
- Marie Annequin (born 1992), French synchronized swimmer
- Marie Annonson (born 1984), American acrobatic gymnast
- Marie Arai (born 1981), Japanese figure skater
- Marie Arana (born 1949), American journalist
- Marie Arena (born 1966), Belgian politician
- Marie Luc Arpin (born 1978), Canadian water polo player
- Marie Dean Arrington (1933–2014), American murderer
- Marie Åsberg (born 1938), Swedish psychiatrist
- Marie Askehave (born 1973), Danish actress and singer
- Marie Atkins (died 2008), Jamaican politician
- Marie Aubry, French operatic soprano
- Marie Grace Augustin (1897–1996), Saint Lucian businesswoman and politician
- Marie von Augustin (1806–1886), Austrian painter and writer
- Marie Ault (1870–1951), British actress
- Marie Avgeropoulos (born 1986), Greek–Canadian actress
- Marie Azpiroz Mellini (1889–?), Spanish violinist

== B ==
- Marie Babka (1885–1978), American politician
- Marie Zdeňka Baborová-Čiháková (1877–1937), Czech botanist and zoologist
- Marie Bach Hansen (born 1985), Danish actress
- Marie Annharte Baker, Canadian poet and author
- Marie Baker (born 1954), Irish Court of Appeal judge since 2018
- Marie Clothilde Balfour (1862–1931), British writer
- Marie Balian (1925–2017), Armenian ceramic artist
- Marie Balmary (born c. 1939), French psychoanalyst and scholar
- Marie Vilhelmine Bang (1848–1932), Danish painter
- Marie Baptiste (1733–after 1786), French stage actress and opera singer
- Marie Barbey-Chappuis (born 1981), Swiss politician
- Marie Barch (1744–1827), Danish ballerina
- Marie Baron (1908–1948), Dutch swimmer and diver
- Marie Bartáková (born 1948), Slovak rower
- Marie Bartête (1863–1938), French prisoner
- Marie Bashir (born 1930), Australian medical administrator and Governor of New South Wales
- Marie Bashkirtseff (1858–1884), Russian artist
- Marie Batomene (born 1995), French badminton player
- Marie Battiste (born 1949), North American author and educator
- Marie Battu (1837–1919), French soprano
- Marie Baum (1874–1964), German politician
- Marie Bäumer (born 1969), German actress
- Marie de Beauvilliers (1574–1667), French abbess of the Catholic Church
- Marie Alexandrine Becker (1879–1942), Belgian serial killer
- Marie Alphonse Bedeau (1804–1863), French general and minister
- Marie Bell (1900–1985), French tragedian, comic actor and stage director
- Marie Bell (educationalist) (1922–2012), New Zealand teacher, lecturer and educationalist
- Marie Belloc Lowndes (1868–1947), English novelist
- Marie Haydée Beltrán Torres (born 1955), Puerto Rican nationalist
- Marie Benešová (1948–2024), Czech politician and lawyer
- Marie Benito (born 1965), Guamanian long-distance runner
- Marie Benoît (born 1995), Belgian tennis player
- Marie Bérard (born 1962), French-Canadian violinist
- Marie Bérenger (1865–1944), French Resistance activist
- Marie Bergman (born 1950), Swedish singer
- Marie Bernard (disambiguation)
- Marie Bernays (1883–1939), German politician
- Marie Rosalie Bertaud (1738–?), French artist
- Marie Besnier Beauvalot (born 1980), French billionaire heiress
- Marie de Bièvre (1865–1940), Belgian painter
- Marie Bignold (1927–2018), Australian politician
- Marie Bigot (1786–1820), French pianist and composer
- Marie Marguerite Bihéron (1719–1795), French artist
- Marie Bilders-van Bosse (1837–1900), Dutch painter
- Marie Bimenyimana (born 1996), Rwandan female cricketer
- Marie Birkl (born 1981), Swedish snowboarder
- Marie Bizet (1905–1998), French actress and singer
- Marie Bjerg (born 1988), Danish footballer
- Marie Bjerre (born 1986), Danish politician and lawyer
- Marie Benedicte Bjørnland (born 1965), Norwegian lawyer and civil servant
- Marie Charlotte Blanc (1833–1881), German businesswoman
- Marie Blancour (fl. 1650–1699), French painter
- Marie Bleck (1911–1949), American printmaker
- Marie Bloch ((1902–1970), French astronomer and astrophysicist
- Marie Bloede (1821–1870), American author
- Marie Blokhus (born 1982), Norwegian actress
- Marie Boas Hall (1919–2009), American historian of science
- Marie Bobillier (1858–1918), French musicologist
- Marie Bochet (born 1994), French para-alpine skier
- Marie Firmin Bocourt (1819–1904), French zoologist and artist
- Marie Boehlen (1911–1999), Swiss jurist and politician
- Marie Boivin (1773–1841), French midwife, inventor and writer
- Marie Bolou (born 1992), French sailor
- Marie Bonaparte (1882–1962), French writer, psychoanalyst and Princess of Greece and Denmark
- Marie Bonfanti (1845–1921), American ballet dancer
- Marie Martine Bonfils (1731–1804), Danish businessperson
- Marie Bonnevial (1841–1918), French teacher and women's rights activist
- Marie Boozer (c. 1846–1908), American socialite and countess
- Marie Borroff (1923–2019), American poet
- Marie Gabriel Georges Bosseront d'Anglade (1858–1929), French diplomat
- Marie Bottrell, Canadian musical artist
- Marie Bouchard (born 1993), French long-distance runner
- Marie Bouffa (1882–1945), Belgian resistance during World War II
- Marie Bouillé, Canadian politician
- Marie Bouliard (1763–1825), French artist
- Marie Boulton, Scottish politician
- Marie Bountrogianni (born 1956), Canadian politician
- Marie Bourgeois (1870–1937), French chef
- Marie Bourdereau (1740–1823), French chambermaid
- Marie Marguerite Bouvet (1865–1915), American author
- Marie Bouzková (born 1998), Czech tennis player
- Marie Bové (born 1975), French politician
- Marie Brackenbury (1866–1950), British painter
- Marie Bracquemond (1840–1916), French painter
- Marie Branser (born 1992), German-born Congolese-Guinean judoka
- Marie Brassard, Canadian actress, theatrical writer and director
- Marie Braun (1911–1982), Dutch swimmer
- Marie Breen Smyth (born 1953), Northern Ireland academic
- Marie Breen (1902–1993), Australian politician
- Marie Bregendahl (1867–1940), Danish writer
- Marie C. Brehm (1859–1926), American Prohibitionist, suffragist and politician
- Marie Brema (1856–1925), British operatic soprano
- Marie Bremner, Australian soprano
- Marie Brémont (1886–2001), French supercentenarian
- Marie Brenden (1938–2012), Norwegian politician
- Marie Brennan, American fantasy author
- Marie Brenner (born 1949), American journalist
- Marie Pauline Brenner (1906–1978), American religious educator
- Marie de Brimeu (1550–1605), Belgian botanist
- Marie Brockmann-Jerosch (1877–1952), Swiss botanist and phylogeographer
- Marie von Brühl (1779–1836), German noblewoman
- Marie Brûlart (1684–1763), French court official
- Marie Bruner Haines (1885–1979), American artist
- Marie Bryant (1919–1978), American dancer and singer
- Marie Kachel Bucher (1909–2008), American teacher
- Marie Magdalene Bull (1827–1907), Norwegian actor and photographer
- Marie von Bülow, German actress
- Marie Bunel (born 1961), French film and stage actress
- Marie von Bunsen (1860–1941), British-born German author and painter
- Marie Burde, German newspaper vendor
- Marie Burke (1894–1988), English actress
- Marie José Burki (born 1961), Swiss visual artist
- Marie Burroughs (1866–1926), American actress
- Marie Byles (1900–1979), Australian lawyer, explorer and conservationist

== C ==
- Marie Cabel (1827–1885), Belgian coloratura soprano
- Marie Cahill (1866–1933), American actress
- Marie Caillou, French graphic artist
- Marie Calloway, American author
- Marie Calm (1832–1887), German author and feminist
- Marie Cantacuzène (1820–1898), Romanian princess and painter's model
- Marie Cantagrill, French violinist
- Marie André Cantillon, French soldier
- Marie Carandini (1826–1894), English-born Australian opera singer
- Marie Cardinal (1929–2001), French writer
- Marie Cardouat (born 1981), French illustrator
- Marie Carlsson (born 1958), Swedish rower
- Marie Carmen (born 1959), Canadian musical artist
- Marie Cassidy, British pathologist
- Marie Castello (1915–2008), American fortuneteller
- Marie Cazin (1844–1924), French painter
- Marie Červinková-Riegrová (1854–1895), Czech writer and librettist
- Marie Chaix (born 1942), French writer
- Marie Chamming's (1923–2022), French writer and resistant
- Marie Champmeslé (died 1698), French actress
- Marie Chapian (born 1938), American writer
- Marie Charbonnel (1880–1969), French opera singer
- Marie Charette-Poulin (born 1945), Canadian politician
- Marie Charpentier (1903–1994), French mathematician
- Marie Léonide Charvin (1832–1891), French actress
- Marie Chiffon (1835–1882), French communists nurse
- Marie Z. Chino (1907–1982), American artist
- Marie Chisholm-Burns, American academic
- Marie Chouinard (born 1955), Canadian dancer, choreographer and dance company director
- Marie Christensen (disambiguation)
- Marie Christianson (born 1988), Canadian curler
- Marie Cico (1841–1875), French singer
- Marie Cinq-Mars, Canadian politician
- Marie Clarke (1915–2020), American labor leader
- Marie Claveau (died 1703), French actress
- Marie Clay (1926–2007), New Zealand academic, educator and researcher
- Marie Clements (born 1962), Canadian Métis filmmaker, playwright, and producer
- Marie Closset (1873–1952), Belgian poet
- Marie Coates, British biologist
- Marie Cochran, American artist, educator and writer
- Marie Amélie Cogniet (1798–1869), French painter
- Marie Colban (1814–1884), Norwegian writer and translator
- Marie Coleman, Australian feminist, social activist, public servant and journalist
- Marie Collart (1842–1911), Belgian artist
- Marie Collier (1927–1971), Australian opera soprano
- Marie Collonvillé (born 1973), French heptathlete
- Marie Colton (1922–2018), American politician
- Marie Colvin (1956–2012), American war correspondent
- Marie Conmee (1933–1994), Irish actor and gay activist
- Marie Connor (1867–1941), English author
- Marie Conway Oemler (1879–1932), American author
- Marie Corelli (1855–1924), English novelist
- Marie Corbett (1859–1932), British suffragist
- Marie Cornish (born 1956), Australian cricketer
- Marie Alfred Cornu (1841–1902), French physicist
- Marie Maxime Cornu (1843–1901), French botanist and mycologist
- Marie Corridon (1930–2010), American swimmer
- Marie Cosindas (1923–2017), American photographer
- Marie Costine, Irish camogie player
- Marie Courtois (c. 1655–1703), French artist
- Marie Couvent (c. 1757–1837), American philanthropist
- Marie Cowan (1938–2008), American nurse and academic
- Marie C. Cox (1920–2005), Native American activist
- Marie Cremers (1874–1960), Dutch artist and author
- Marie Crous, French mathematician
- Marie Crowe, New Zealand psychotherapy academic
- Marie Curie (1867–1934), Polish–French physicist
- Marie Currie (born 1959), American singer
- Marie Curtin (born 1985), Irish soccer and Gaelic player
- Marie Curtis (1912–2006), Canadian politician
- Marie Cuttoli (1879–1973), French businesswoman

== D ==
- Marie Dacke, Swedish biologist and researcher
- Marie Daëms (1928–2016), French actress
- Marie Dähnhardt (1818–1902), German suffragette
- Marie Dainton (1881–1938), British opera singer
- Marie Jesika Dalou (born 1979), Mauritian weightlifter
- Marie Maynard Daly (1921–2003), American biochemist
- Marie C. Damour, American diplomat
- Marie Danforth Page (1869–1940), American painter
- Marie Danse (1866–1942), Belgian artist
- Marie Darby (1940–2019), New Zealand marine biologist and teacher
- Marie Célestine Amélie d'Armaillé (1830–1918), French biographer, historian, and writer
- Marie Darrieussecq (born 1969), French writer
- Marie Dauchy (born 1987), French politician
- Marie Dauguet, French poet
- Marie Daulne (born 1964), French singer
- Marie Daveluy (born 1936), Canadian opera singer
- Marie Davenport (born 1975), Irish long-distance runner
- Marie Davidian, American biostatistician
- Marie Davidsen (born 1993), Norwegian handball player
- Marie Davidson, French-Canadian musician
- Marie Davignon, Canadian cinematographer and film director
- Marie Davis Pierre (1918–2014), Dominican politician
- Marie De Becker (1880–1946), English-American actress
- Marie De Keyser (1815–1879), Belgian painter
- Marie de Man (1855–1944), Dutch numismatist, painter, author, curator
- Marie Déa (1912–1992), French actress
- Marie Eugène Debeney (1864–1943), French army general
- Marie Decca (1859-unknown), American lyric soprano operatic singer
- Marie Dechman, Canadian politician
- Marie Decugis (1884–1969), French tennis player
- Marie Deetz (1835–1893), German mezzo-soprano and stage actress
- Marie Delaporte (1838–1910), French actress
- Marie Delarbre (born 1994), German ice hockey player
- Marie Delattre (born 1981), French sprint canoeist
- Marie Delna (1875–1932), French opera singer
- Marie Deluil-Martiny (1841–1884), French religious sister
- Marie Denarnaud (born 1978), French actress
- Marie Denizard (1872–1959), in 1913, the first woman to stand as a candidate in a French presidential election
- Marie Depage (1872–1915), Belgian nurse
- Marie desJardins, American computer scientist
- Marie Desbrosses (1764–1856), French operatic mezzo-soprano
- Marie Deschamps (born 1952), Canadian judge of the Supreme Court
- Marie Desplechin (born 1959), French writer
- Marie Dessart (born 1980), Belgian cyclist
- Marie André Destarac (born 1981), Guatemalan scientist
- Marie Detruyer (born 2004), Belgian footballer
- Marie Devellereau, French light lyric operatic soprano
- Marie Devereux (1940–2019), British model and film actress
- Marie A. DiBerardino (1926–2013), American biologist
- Marie Diener-West, American statistician
- Marie Dietrich, birth name of Marlene Dietrich (1901–1992), German-American actress and singer
- Marie Dietrich (soprano) (1868–1939), German opera singer
- Marié Digby (born 1983), American musician
- Marie Doležalová (born 1987), Czech actress
- Marie Dollinger (1910–1994), German track and field athlete
- Marie Dompnier (born 1980), French actress
- Marie Donigan (born 1954), American politician
- Marie Dorin Habert (born 1986), French biathlete
- Marie Aioe Dorion (c. 1786–1850), Métis fur trader
- Marie Doro (1882–1956), American actress
- Marie Dorval (1798–1849), French actress
- Marie Dressler (1868–1934), Canadian–American actress
- Marie Drouet (1885–1963), French heroine of the First World War
- Marie Drucker (born 1974), French author and journalist
- Marie Du Toit, South African film actress
- Marie Dubois (1937–2014), French actress
- Marie Duchatel (1652–1692), Flemish artist
- Marie Duflo (1940–2019), French probability theorist
- Marie Jonet Dugès (1730–1797), French head midwife of Hôtel-Dieu
- Marie Duhem (1871–1918), French painter
- Marie Dumesnil (1713–1803), French actress
- Marie Dupayage (born 2000), French ice dancer
- Marie Duplessis (1824–1847), French courtesan
- Marie Dupouy (born 2002), French rugby union footballer
- Marie Jules Dupré (1813–1881), French colonial administrator
- Marie Dupré, 17th-century French poet and scholar
- Marie Durand (1711–1776), French Protestant
- Marie Durocher (1809–1893), Brazilian physician
- Marie Dušková (1903–1968), Czech poet
- Marie Duval (1847–1890), British cartoonist
- Marie D. Dworak (1919–2006), American politician

== E ==
- Marie Ebikake, Nigerian politician
- Marie von Ebner-Eschenbach (1830–1916), Austrian writer
- Marie Edmonds (born 1975), British scientist
- Marie Stuart Edwards, American suffragist
- Marie Eggeling, German bridge player
- Marie Egner (1850–1940), Austrian painter
- Marie Ehrling (born 1955), Swedish executive
- Marie Ejlersen (1892–?), Danish film editor
- Marie Ekorre (born 1952), Swedish actress and model
- Marie D. Eldridge (1926–2009), American statistician
- Marie Gisèle Eleme Asse (born 1995), Cameroonian sprinter
- Marie Eline (1902–1981), American actress
- Marie Ellenrieder (1791–1863), German painter
- Marie Elwood (1932–2012), Canadian museum curator and historian
- Marie Emmons (1872–1945), American politician
- Marie Empress, British actress
- Marie Engström (born 1953), Swedish politician
- Marie Equi (1872–1952), American doctor and radical
- Marie Étienne, French poet and novelist
- Marie Hall Ets (1895–1984), American writer
- Marie Ewrelius (born 1967), Swedish footballer

== F ==
- Marie Fabianová (1872–1943), Czech mathematician and teacher
- Marie Farge (born 1953), French mathematician and physicist
- Marie Leonore Farr, Austrian-born U.S. mycologist
- Marie Favereau, French historian
- Marie Charlotte Fayanga, Central African politician
- Marie Khone Faye, First Lady of Senegal
- Marie Fedor, American actress
- Marie Fegue (born 1991), Cameroonian weightlifter
- Marie Fel (1713–1794), French opera singer
- Marie Ferdinand-Harris (born 1978), American basketball player
- Marie Ferranti, French writer
- Marie Ferrarella (born 1948), American novelist
- Marie Ferré (1845–1882), French activist
- Marie Ferrier-Perregaux (1777–1838), Swiss artist
- Marie Ficarra (born 1954), Australian politician
- Marie Fillunger (1850–1930), Austrian opera singer
- Marie Poland Fish (1900–1989), American marine biologist
- Marie Fisher (1931–2008), Australian politician
- Marie Fleischer, Greenlandic businesswoman and politician
- Marie Fleming (1953–2013), Irish campaigner for assisted suicide
- Marie Theres Fögen (1946–2008), German jurist and historian
- Marie Foley (born 1959), Irish sculptor and installation artist
- Marie de Ford Keller, American painter
- Marie Forleo (born 1975), American life coach
- Marie K. Formad (1860–1944), American physician
- Marie Foster (1917–2003), American civil rights activist
- Marie Foucher-Creteau (1925–2015), French swimmer
- Marie Foulston, independent video games curator
- Marie Fox (1850–1878), French-born English writer
- Marie France (born 1946), French actress and singer
- Marie Pierre Adrien Francastel (1761–1831), French politician
- Marie du Fresnay (1809–1892), French writer
- Marie Fredriksson (1958–2019), Swedish singer and songwriter
- Marie Freeman-Thomas, Marchioness of Willingdon (1875–1960), Canadian viceregal consort
- Marie Friberg (1852–1934), Swedish opera singer
- Marie Frommer (1890–1976), German architect
- Marie Frugone (1889–1953), American journalist and community leader
- Marie Fuema (born 1987), Senegalese-Congolese model

== G ==
- Marie Gabert, American poker player
- Marie Armande Jeanne Gacon-Dufour (1753–1835), French writer and economist
- Marie Galbraith (1946–2022), American politician
- Marie Galway (1876–1963), British women's rights activist
- Marie Garstang (1880–1949), British archaeologist
- Marie Gaspard (born 1978), French canoeist
- Marie Clément Gaston Gautier (1841–1911), French botanist and agriculturalist
- Marie Gayot (born 1989), French sprinter
- Marie Geelmuyden (1856–1935), Norwegian chemist and teacher
- Marie Geistinger (1833–1903), Austrian actress and operatic soprano
- Marie George (1876–1955), American actress
- Marie Gerbron (born 1986), French-British handball player
- Marie Lacoste Gérin-Lajoie (1867–1945), Canadian feminist and professor
- Marie Gernet (1865–1924), German mathematician
- Marie Gervais-Vidricaire (born 1955), Canadian former diplomat
- Marie Gevers (1883–1975), Belgian novelist
- Marie Gibeau (1950–2002), Canadian politician
- Marie Gigault de Bellefonds (1624–1706), French writer
- Marie Gignac, Canadian actress
- Marie Laure Gigon (born 1984), French sport shooter
- Marie Gil, French writer and academic
- Marie Gillain (born 1975), Belgian actress
- Marie Glázrová, Czech film actress
- Marie Glory (1905–2009), French actress
- Marie Gluesenkamp Perez (born 1988), American politician
- Marie Gnahoré (born 1976), Ivorian sprinter
- Marie van Goethem (1865–?), French ballet dancer
- Marie Joséphine Goetz (1817–1874), French nun
- Marie Goetze (1865–1922), German contralto
- Marie Goldman (born 1977), British politician
- Marie Goldsmith (1862–1933), Russian anarchist and biologist
- Marie Goodman Hunter (1929–2024), American actor, singer and educator
- Marie Goossens (1894–1991), British harpist
- Marie Göranzon (born 1942), Swedish actress
- Marie Goslich (1859–1938), German photographer and editor
- Marie Goth (1887–1975), American painter
- Marie Gottschalk (born 1958), American political scientist
- Marie de Gournay (1565–1645), French writer
- Marie Grégoire (born 1965), Canadian politician
- Marie Grisier-Montbazon (1859–1922), French actress
- Marie Grubbe (1643–1718), Danish noblewoman
- Marie Gruber (1955–2018), German actress
- Marie Guenet de Saint-Ignace (1610–1646), French-Canadian abbess and hospital manager
- Marie Guerlain (born 1975), French artist, designer and nutrition health coach
- Marie Guévenoux (born 1976), French politician
- Marie Guillard (born 1972), French actress
- Marie Guilleray, French singer
- Marie Nicolas Sylvestre Guillon (1760–1847), French ecclesiastic and librarian
- Marie Guillot (1880–1934), French trade unionist
- Marie Guiraud, French-American pioneer and rancher
- Marie Gülich (born 1994), German basketball player
- Marie Gutheil-Schoder (1874–1935), German soprano
- Marie Guy-Stéphan (1818–1873), French dancer

== H ==
- Marie Hackman (1776–1865), Finnish businessperson
- Marie Hall (1884–1956), British musician
- Marie Halvey (1895–1967), American film editor
- Marie Montgomerie Hamilton (1891–1955), Australian pathologist and hockey administrator
- Marie Hammarström (born 1982), Swedish footballer
- Marie Hammer (1907–2002), Danish zoologist
- Marie Hammontree (died 2012), American author
- Marie Hamsun (1881–1969), Norwegian actress and writer
- Marie Frances Lisette Hanbury (1868–1941), British peeress and suffragist
- Marie Hanfstängl (1847–1917), German opera singer
- Marie Hanlon (born 1948), Irish artist working in various media
- Marie Hansen (1918–1969), American photojournalist
- Marie Haps (1879–1939), Belgian educationalist
- Marie Hardiman (born 1975), British swimmer
- Marie Harf (born 1981), political commentator for Fox News
- Marie Harmon (1923–2021), American actress
- Marie Hasler, New Zealand politician
- Marie Hassenpflug (1788–1856), German fairytale teller
- Marie Hauge (1864–1931), Norwegian artist
- Marie Haupt (1849–1928), German operatic soprano
- Marie de Hautefort (1616–1691), French noble
- Marie Hayward (1939–2011), English soprano
- Marie Marguerite Françoise Hébert (1756–1794), French wife of revolutionary leader
- Marie Hedberg (born 1977), Swedish professional golfer
- Marie Hedemark (1873–1959), Norwegian actress
- Marié Heese (born 1942), South African novelist and teacher
- Marie Heffenisch (1902–1985), Luxembourgish women's rights activist
- Marie Heiberg (1890–1942), Estonian poet
- Marie Heijermans (1859–1937), Dutch painter
- Marie Heineken (1844–1930), Dutch artist
- Marie Helvin (born 1952), American fashion model
- Marie Henein (born 1966), Canadian criminal defense lawyer
- Marie de Hennezel (born 1946), French psychologist, psychotherapist and writer
- Marie Henning (1895–1948), German activist and politician
- Marie Henriksen (born 1993), Norwegian handball player
- Marie Henriksson (born 1955), Swedish female curler
- Marie Henriques (1866–1944), Danish painter
- Marie Herbert, Irish-born adventurer and novelist
- Marie Herbst (1928–2015), American politician
- Marie Heritesová (1881–1970), Czech violinist
- Marie Hermanson, Swedish writer and journalist
- Marie Herndl, German stained glass artist
- Marie Herping (born 1984), Danish footballer
- Marie Heurtin, French deaf blind person
- Marie Hicks (1923–2007), American civil rights activist
- Marie Inez Hilger (1891–1977), American Benedictine nun and anthropologist
- Marie Hilton, British pioneer of creches
- Marie Hines (born 1986), American singer-songwriter
- Marie Hjelmer (1869–1937), Danish women's rights activist
- Marie Höbinger (born 2001), Austrian footballer
- Marie Høeg (1866–1949), Norwegian photographer
- Marie Hoesly (1916–2003), American gymnast
- Marie Hoheisel (1873–1947), Austrian women's rights activist
- Marie Höljer (born 1965), Swedish cyclist
- Marie Holzman (born 1952), French sinologist
- Marie Horáčková (born 1997), Czech archer
- Marie Horseman (1911–1974), Australian artist
- Marie Hourihan (born 1989), Irish footballer
- Marie Jenney Howe (1870–1934), American feminist organizer and writer
- Marie Howe (born 1950), American poet
- Marie Howet (1897–1984), Belgian expressionist painter and illustrator
- Marie Hoy, Australian musician and actress
- Marie Hoyau (born 1997), French ski jumper
- Marie Hrachová (born 1963), Czech table tennis player
- Marie Huch (1853–1934), German writer
- Marie Huet (1859–1939), French painter
- Marie T. Huhtala (born 1949), American Career Foreign Service Officer
- Marie Hull, American painter
- Marie Hüllenkremer (1943–2004), German female journalist
- Marie Humbert, Ghanaian actress
- Marie Huot (1846–1930), French writer and activist
- Marie Hušková (born 1942), Czech mathematician and statistician

== I ==
- Marie Iitoyo (born 1998), Japanese actress and fashion model
- Marie Imanizabayo (born 1996), Rwandan basketball player
- Marie Inbona (born 1980), French television presenter
- Marie C. Ingalls, American politician
- Marie Ismaël-Garcin (1858–1946), French opera singer
- Marie Mediatrice Izabiliza, Rwandan politician

== J ==
- Marie Jacobsson (born 1964), Swedish synchronized swimmer
- Marie Jacq (1919–2014), French politician
- Marie Jacquet (born 1994), French rower
- Marie Jacquot, French conductor
- Marie Jaëll (1846–1925), French pianist and composer
- Marie Jahoda (1907–2001), British Austrian-born psychologist
- Marie Jaisson, French sociologist
- Marie Jakober (1941–2017), Canadian novelist
- Marie Jakus (1915–1997), American biologist and microscopist
- Marie Jamora (born 1978), Filipino director
- Marie Jansen (1857–1914), American actress and singer
- Marie Janson (1873–1960), Belgian politician
- Marie Janssen, Belgian tennis player
- Marie Javins (born 1966), American comic book editor, comic book colorist and travel writer
- Marie Carmelle Jean-Marie, Haitian politician
- Marie Jensen (1845–1921), German painter
- Marie Jepsen (1940–2018), Danish politician
- Marie Jerge (born 1953), American Lutheran bishop
- Marie Johnson (disambiguation)
- Marie Johnston, British psychologist
- Marie Jones, British actress
- Marie de Jonge (1872–1951), Dutch artist
- Marie Joseph (1920–1996), British writer
- Marie Joussaye (1864–1949), Canadian poet
- Marie Joys (1872–1944), Norwegian nurse and educator
- Marie Jubran (1911–1956), Syrian singer
- Marie Juchacz (1879–1956), German politician
- Marie Jungius (1864–1908), Dutch educator, writer, and activist

== K ==
- Marie Kai (born 1980), Japanese actress
- Marie Kaipu (born 1997), Papuan New Guinean footballer
- Marie Kaldvee (born 1995), Estonian curler
- Marie Kalff (1874–1959), Dutch actress
- Marie Karlsson, Swedish footballer
- Marie Karsten (1872–1953), Norwegian interior designer
- Marie Kazmierczak (1920–2000), American baseball player
- Marie Kean (1918–1993), Irish actress
- Marie Keen (1895–1967), American politician
- Marie Kelly, English cricketer
- Marie Kendall (1873–1964), British music hall performer
- Marie Boening Kendall, American painter
- Marie Hartig Kendall, American photographer
- Marie Kessels (born 1954), Dutch writer and poet
- Marie Kettnerová (1911–1998), Czech table tennis player
- Marie von Keudell (1838–1918), German painter
- Marie Key (born 1979), Danish singer
- Marie Khoury (born 2001), Lebanese swimmer
- Marie Kibler (1912–1978), American gymnast
- Marie Heleen Lisette Kikkas (born 1996), Estonian footballer
- Marie Killick (1914–1964), English audio engineer
- Marie Lopez Kirkley-Bey (1941–2025), American politician
- Marie Goebel Kimball (1889–1955), American historian
- Marie Kingué, Haitian healer and diviner
- Marie Kinnberg (1806–1858), Swedish photographer
- Marie von Kleist (1761–1831), German courtier
- Marie S. Klooz (1901–2002), American lawyer
- Marie Knight (1920–2009), American musician
- Marie Knutsen (born 1982), Norwegian footballer
- Marie Kocurek, American basketball player
- Marie Kohler (born 1951), American writer and playwright
- Marie Koizumi (born 1965), Japanese novelist
- Marie Christina Kolo, Malagasy climate activist, ecofeminist and social entrepreneur
- Marie Koopmans-de Wet (1834–1906), South African philanthropist
- Marie Koré (died 1953), Ivory Coast independence fighter
- Marie Korsaga (born 1984), Burkinabé astrophysicist
- Marie Köstler (1879–1965), Austrian nurse, trade unionist and politician
- Marie Koupal Lusk (1862–1929), American painter
- Marie Kovářová (1927–2023), Czech gymnast
- Marie Kraja (1911–1999), Albanian opera singer
- Marie Krarup (born 1965), Danish politician
- Marie Kreft (1876–1963), German politician
- Marie Kremer (born 1982), Belgian actress
- Marie Kreutzer, Austrian film director and screenwriter
- Marie Krogh (1874–1943), Danish physician, physiologist and nutritionist
- Marie Krøyer (1867–1940), Danish painter
- Marie Kruckel (1924–2012), American baseball player
- Marie Kruse (1842–1923), Danish schoolteacher
- Marie Krysińska (1857–1908), French poet and musician
- Marie Kubiak (born 1981), French footballer
- Marie Kunert (1871–1957), German politician
- Marie Kurková (born 1996), Czech volleyball player
- Marie Kuunnuaq (1933–1990), Canadian Inuk artist

== L ==
- Marie Laberge (born 1950), Canadian comedian, educator and writer
- Marie Laeng-Stucki, Swiss entrepreneur in the sound industry
- Marie Lafarge (1816–1852), French murderer
- Marie Laforêt (1939–2019), French actress and singer
- Marie Melchior Joseph Théodose de Lagrené (1800–1862), French diplomat
- Marie Laing (1937–2023), Canadian politician
- Marie Laissus (born 1978), French snowboarder
- Marie Lajus (born 1971), French civil servant
- Marie Lambert (1935–1961), Swiss motorcycle racer
- Marie Lang (1858–1934), Austrian feminist, theosophist and publisher
- Marie Lannoo (born 1954), Canadian artist
- Marie de Latour (1750–1834), Belgian artist
- Marie de La Tour d'Auvergne, 17th-century French noblewoman
- Marie Charlotte de La Trémoille (1632–1682), French noble
- Marie Laurencin (1883–1956), French painter, poet and paintmaker
- Marie Laveau (1801–1881), New Orleans voodoo practitioner
- Marie Adrien Lavieille (1852–1911), French painter
- Marie Ernestine Lavieille (1852–1937), French painter
- Marie Layet (1885–1937), American screenwriter
- Marie Le Compte, American journal editor and anarchist
- Marie Le Conte, French-Moroccan journalist
- Marie Le Franc (1879–1964), French writer
- Marie Le Gendre, 16th-century French humanist
- Marie Le Rochois (c. 1650–1728), French opera singer
- Marie Lebec (born 1990), French politician
- Marie Lebihan, Nigerian politician
- Marie Lebour (1876–1971), British marine biologist
- Marie Jean François Philibert Lecarlier d'Ardon (1752–1799), French landowner and politician
- Marie Lederer (1927–2025), American politician
- Marie Lee (writer), American author, novelist and essayist
- Marie Madeleine Lee (born 1932), Mauritian politician and diplomat
- Marie Lehmann (soprano) (1851–1931), German soprano
- Marie Lehmann (journalist) (born 1965), Swedish sports journalist and television host
- Marie Lemoine (1887–1984), French botanist
- Marie Anne Lenormand (1772–1843), French bookseller, necromancer, fortune-teller and cartomancer
- Marie LeNôtre, French education administrator and philanthropist
- Marie Léopold-Lacour (1859–1942), French activist, journalist, and writer
- Marie Léra (1864–1958), French journalist, novelist, and translator
- Marie-Evelyne Lessard, Canadian actress
- Marie Clémence Lesson (1800–1834), French illustrator
- Marie Lesueur (1799–1890), French ballet dancer
- Marie Levasseur (born 1997), Canadian soccer player
- Marie Levens (born 1950), Surinamese diplomat and politician
- Marie Lhuissier, French mathematical story-teller
- Marie Liljedahl (born 1950), Swedish actress
- Marie Lindberg (disambiguation)
- Marie Linde, South African novelist
- Marie Lindgren (born 1970), Swedish freestyle skier
- Marie Lindqvist (born 1970), Swedish ballet dancer
- Marie Line, French singer
- Marie Lion, French-Australian novelist
- Marie Litta (1856–1883), American opera singer
- Marie Little (1933–2014), Australian sport administrator
- Marie Litton (1847–1884), English actress and theatre manager
- Marie Litzinger (1899–1952), American mathematician
- Marie Ljalková (1920–2011), Czech World War II sniper
- Marie Lloyd (1870–1922), English singer
- Marie Lloyd Jr. (1888–1967), British entertainer, composer and actress
- Marie Loeper-Housselle (1837–1916), German educator and advocate for the education of girls and women
- Marie Loftus (1857–1940), British music hall entertainer
- Marie Bruneau des Loges (1584–1641), French salon holder
- Marie Logoreci (1920–1988), Albanian actress
- Marie Lohr (1890–1975), Australian actress
- Marie Løkke (1877–1948), Norwegian artist
- Marie Lopez del Puerto, Mexican and American physicist
- Marie Lora-Mungai (born 1981), French television and media producer and consultant
- Marie Lorenz, American artist
- Marie Lorraine (1899–1982), Australian actress
- Marie Losier (born 1972), French filmmaker and curator
- Marie Lourdais (1761–1856), French revolutionary spy, smuggler and nurse
- Marie Louville (born 1946), French journalist
- Marié Louw, South African field hockey player
- Marie Lu (born 1984), American author
- Marie Lucas (disambiguation)
- Marie Luhring (1892–1939), American automotive engineer, one of the first female truck designers in the United States
- Marie Dominique Luizet (1852–1930), French botanist
- Marie Lund, Swedish ski-orienteering competitor
- Marie Lundquist (born 1950), Swedish author, cultural journalist and translator
- Marie Lundqvist-Björk (born 1947), Swedish gymnast

== M ==
- Marie Armand Patrice de Mac Mahon (1855–1927), French noblewoman
- Marie Macarte (1826–1892), English equestrienne and circus performer
- Marie Machacek, American astrophysicist
- Marie Henry Mackenzie (1878–1961), Dutch artist
- Marie Macklin (born 1965), Scottish businesswoman
- Marie Maclean, Australian scholar of French literature
- Marie Mahoney (1924–2016), baseball player
- Marie Maitland, Scottish writer
- Marie C. Malaro (1933–2018), American lawyer
- Marie Malavoy (born 1948), Canadian politician
- Marie Ortal Malka, French singer
- Marie Málková (born 1941), Czech actress
- Marie Mancini (1639–1715), mistress of the King of France
- Marie Manning (murderer) (c. 1821–1849), Swiss murderer
- Marie Manning (writer), American columnist and novelist
- Marie Mansart (1925–2012), French film actress
- Marie Mansfield (1931–2024), American baseball player
- Marie Manthey (1935–2024), American nurse, author and entrepreneur
- Marie March, American 21st century politician
- Marie Marchand-Arvier (born 1985), French alpine skier
- Marie Marchowsky (1916–1977), American modern dancer and choreographer
- Marie Mariterangi (1926–1971), Tahitian singer
- Marie Dølvik Markussen (born 1997), Norwegian footballer
- Marie Martin, birth name of Thérèse of Lisieux (1873–1897), French Catholic nun and saint
- Marie Martinod (born 1984), French freestyle skier
- Marie Sneve Martinussen (born 1985), Norwegian politician
- Marie Smallface Marule (1944–2014), Canadian academic administrator, activist and educator
- Marie Marville (1873–1961), French lyric artist
- Marie Marvingt (1875–1963), French athlete, mountaineer, aviator and journalist
- Marie Mason Potts (1895–1978), Maidu cultural leader, activist, educator, journalist and writer
- Marie Isabelle Massip, Canadian diplomat
- Marie Masters (born 1941), American actress
- Marie Mathieu (born 1956), Puerto Rican sprinter
- Marie Matiko (born 1970), American actress
- Marie Mattfeld (1870–1927), German opera singer
- Marie Maugeret (1844–1928), French novelist and conservative Catholic
- Marie Mävers (born 1991), German field hockey player
- Marie Mayoux (1878–1969), French teacher
- Marie McCormick (born 1946), American pediatrician
- Marie McDemmond (1946–2022), American academic
- Marie McDonald (1923–1965), American actress and singer
- Marie McDonough (1917–2013), Australian cricketer
- Marie McLaughlin (born 1954), Scottish operatic soprano
- Marie McMahon (born 1953), Australian female artist
- Marie McMillin (1902–1954), American aviator
- Marie McNair, Scottish National Party politician
- Marie McPhedran (1900–1974), Canadian writer
- Marie Meade, Native American professor and tradition bearer
- Marie Meierhofer (1909–1998), Swiss children's psychiatrist and pedagogue
- Marie Melchers (born 1939), Belgian fencer
- Marie-Angélique Memmie Le Blanc (died 1750), French feral woman
- Marie Menage (born 1967), Mauritian windsurfer
- Marie Mendras (born 1957), Russian political scientist
- Marie Menheer (1924–2003), American baseball player
- Marie Menken (1909–1970), American filmmaker, painter, and socialite
- Marie Mennessier-Nodier (1811–1893), French musician, poet and writer
- Marie Mercury Roth (1926–2020), American chemist
- Marie J. Mergler (1851–1901), American physician and surgeon
- Marie Mesmeur, French politician
- Marie Metze (born 1938), American politician
- Marie Meurdrac, 17th-century French chemist
- Marie-Anett Mey (born 1971), French singer
- Marie Meyer (aviator), American pilot, wingwalker and parachutist
- Marie Meyer (linguist) (1897–1969), American linguist and spy
- Marie Meza (born 1990), Costa Rican swimmer
- Marie Yanick Mezile, Haitian women's rights advocate
- Marie Gabrielle Mfegue, Cameroonian journalist
- Marie-Gaïané Mikaelian (born 1984), Swiss tennis player
- Marie Miller (born 1989), American musician
- Marie Minnaert (born 1999), Belgian footballer
- Marie Caroline Miolan-Carvalho (1827–1895), French operatic soprano
- Marie Lynn Miranda, American data scientist and academic administrator
- Marie Misamu (1974–2016), Congolese singer and composer
- Marie Miyake (born 1985), Japanese voice actress
- Marie Mizuno, Japanese voice actress
- Marie Mutsuki Mockett, Asian-American novelist and memoirist
- Marie Modiano (born 1978), French singer and writer
- Marie Moentmann, American accident victim
- Marie Molijn, Dutch artist
- Marie Moloney (born 1958), Irish politician
- Marie Mongan, American educator and writer
- Marie Monnier (1894–1976), French illustrator and embroiderer
- Marie Monsen (1878–1962), Norwegian missionary
- Marie Montpetit (born 1979), Canadian politician
- Marie Möör, French singer and songwriter
- Marie Moore (born 1967), Canadian swimmer
- Marie T. Mora (born 1969), American economist
- Marie Moralee (born 1971), English cricketer
- Marie Morisawa (1919–1994), American geomorphologist
- Marie Mørk, Danish teacher and school founder
- Marie Moser, Canadian writer
- Marie Mosquini (1899–1983), American actress
- Marie Jonas de la Motte (1627–1683), Dutch prostitute and art model
- Marie Magdelaine Mouron, French soldier
- Marie Mouté (born 1983), French actress
- Mar'ie Muhammad (1939–2016), Indonesian politician and philanthropist
- Marie Sheehan Muhler (born 1937), American politician
- Marie Mullen (born 1953), Irish actress
- Marie Muller (disambiguation)
- Marie Munk (1885–1978), German-American lawyer
- Marie Muracciole, French art curator, critic and author
- Marie Murphy-Rollins (born 1959), Irish long-distance runner
- Marie Müser (born 1997), German politician
- Marie Myriam (born 1957), French singer of Portuguese descent

== N ==
- Marie Nademlejnská (1896–1974), Czech actress
- Marie von Najmajer (1844–1904), Austrian novelist and poet
- Marie Narelle (1870–1941), Australian singer
- Marie Nathusius (1817–1857), German novelist and composer
- Marie Naylor (1856–1940), British artist and militant suffragette
- Marie Khemesse Ngom Ndiaye, Senegalese doctor and politician
- Marie Catharine Neal (1889–1965), American botanist and author
- Marie Němcová (born 2000), Czech canoeist
- Marie du Sautoy Newby (1880–1962), English suffragette
- Marie Newman (born 1964), American politician
- Marie Ney (1895–1981), British actress
- Marie N'Goussou (born 2008), French para athlete
- Marie Nicholson (born 1976), Swedish politician
- Marie Nicolas (1845–1903), French painter
- Marie Niedermann (1880–1967), Danish actress
- Marie Nightingale (1928–2014), Canadian cookbook writer
- Marie Chantal Nijimbere, Burundian government minister
- Marie Nilsson (born 1964), Swedish trade unionist
- Marie Nimier (born 1957), French writer
- Marie-Étienne Nitot (1750–1809), French jeweler
- Marie Nizet (1859–1922), Belgian writer
- Marie Samuel Njie, Gambian musical artist
- Marie Noe (1928–2016), American serial killer
- Marie Noël (1883–1967), French writer and poet
- Marie Nordén (born 1967), Swedish politician
- Marie Nordstrom (1886–1979), American actress
- Marie Norton Harriman (1903–1970), American art collector
- Marie Novello (1884–1928), Welsh pianist
- Marie U. Nylen (born 1924), Danish-American biologist, dentist, microscopist and badminton player
- Marie Nyswander (1919–1986), American psychiatrist and psychoanalyst

== O ==
- Marie Ohier (1853–1941), French croquet player
- Marie Ohlsson (born 1980), Swedish ski orienteer
- Marie Olaussen, Norwegian orienteering competitor
- Marie von Olfers (1826–1924), German writer, illustrator and salonnière
- Marie Oliver (disambiguation)
- Marie Thusgaard Olsen (born 1993), Danish sailor
- Marie Olsson (born 1967), Swedish politician
- Marie Oppert (born 1997), French singer and actress
- Marie Orav (1911–1994), Estonian chess player
- Marie Orensanz (born 1936), Argentine artist
- Marie Osborne Yeats (1911–2010), American actress
- Marie Osmond (born 1959), American singer, actress and businessperson
- Marie Oteiza (born 1994), French modern pentathlete
- Marie Overbye (born 1976), Danish triathlete
- Marie Owens (1853–1927), early American female police officer
- Marie Oyon (1898–1969), French politician

== P ==
- Marie Pachler (1792–1855), Austrian pianist
- Marie Solange Pagonendji-Ndakala (born 1962), Central African politician
- Marie Panayotopoulos-Cassiotou (born 1952), Greek politician
- Marie Panthès (1871–1955), French pianist
- Marie Papaix, French association football player
- Marie Pape-Carpantier (1815–1878), French educator
- Marie Paradis (1779–1839), first woman to climb Mont Blanc
- Marie Parcello (1860–1937), American opera singer
- Marie Parent (1853–1934), Belgian journal editor and feminist
- Marie Parente (1928–2019), American politician
- Marie Parrocel (1743–1824), French artist
- Marie Patouillet (born 1988), French Paralympic cyclist
- Marie Patterson (1934–2021), British trade unionist
- Marie Pavey, American stage actress
- Marie Pavie, French calligrapher
- Marie Pélissier (died 1749), French opera singer
- Marie Peltier (born 1980), Belgian author
- Marie Penny (died 1970), Canadian businesswoman
- Marie Perbost, French composer
- Marie Perolz (1874–1950), Irish nationalist
- Marie Adrien Persac (1823–1873), Franco-American artist and cartographer
- Marie Persson (born 1967), Swedish female curler
- Marie Bjelke Petersen (1874–1969), Danish-Australian novelist and physical culture teacher
- Marie Petersen (1816–1859), German author
- Marie Petiet (1854–1893), French painter
- Marie Petipa (1857–1930), Russian ballerina
- Marie Phillips (born 1976), British writer
- Marie Phisalix (1861–1946), French herpetologist
- Marie Picasso (born 1979), Swedish model and singer
- Marie Pieris, French lady in waiting
- Marie Yves Dina Jean Pierre (born 1990), Haitian footballer
- Marie Plácido (born 1987), Puerto Rican basketball player
- Marie Pleyel (1811–1875), Belgian concert pianist
- Marie Plosjö, Swedish model
- Marie Pochon (born 1990), French environmental activist and politician
- Marie Podvalová (1909–1992), Czech opera singer
- Marie Poissonnier (born 1979), French pole vaulter
- Marie Poledňáková (1941–2022), Czech firm director
- Marie Polli (born 1980), Swiss race walker
- Marie Pollmann (born 1989), German footballer
- Marie Ponsot (1921–2019), American poet
- Marie Popelin (1846–1913), Belgian advocate, educator and feminist
- Marie Portolano (born 1985), French sports journalist
- Marie Pošarová, Czech politician
- Marie Victor Poterlet, French wallpaper designer
- Marie Poulson, American politician
- Marie Powers (1902–1973), American opera singer
- Marie Prescott (1850–1893), American stage actress
- Marie Prestat (1862–1933), French organist and composer
- Marie Preus (born 2008), Norwegian footballer
- Marie Prevost (1896–1937), Canadian actress
- Marie Price, American geographer and international affairs export
- Marie Priess, German anti-fascist resistance fighter
- Marie Prins, South African botanist
- Marie Proksch (1836–1900), Czech pianist, music educator and composer
- Marie Prouvensier (born 1994), French handball player
- Marie Purvis (born 1961), British cyclist

== Q ==
- Marie Quellhorst (born 1998), German para-cyclist
- Marie Quillan (1909–1998), American actress

== R ==
- Marie Marcelle Buteau Racine (1934–2020), Haitian American linguist and professor
- Marie Rådbo (born 1946), Swedish astronomer
- Marie Rader (born 1941), American politician
- Marie Rafajová (1896–1976), Czech poet
- Marie Rainford, American film actress
- Marie Rambert (1888–1982), Polish-born English dancer
- Marie Ramírez, Costa Rican ten-pin bowler
- Marie Rappold (1872–1957), American opera singer
- Marie Rasmussen (born 1972), Danish pole vaulter
- Marie Raymond (1908–1988), French painter
- Marie Magdeleine Real del Sarte (1853–1927), French painter
- Marie Reay (1922–2004), Australian anthropologist
- Marie Recio (1814–1862), French opera singer
- Marie Redd, American politician
- Marie Redonnet, French writer
- Marie Rée (1835–1900), Danish newspaper publisher
- Marie Borge Refsum (1927–2023), Norwegian politician
- Marie de Régnier (1875–1963), French novelist and poet
- Marie Régnier (1840–1887), French writer
- Marie van Regteren Altena (1868–1958), Dutch painter
- Marie Reim (born 2000), German pop singer
- Marie Remy (1829–1915), German flower and still life painter
- Marie Renard (1864–1939), Austrian opera singer
- Marie Renaud, Canadian politician
- Marie Rennotte (1852–1942), Belgian-Brazilian teacher and physician
- Marie Roch Louis Reybaud (1799–1879), French writer, political economist and politician
- Marie Reynoard (1897–1945), French resistant fighter during World War II
- Marie Richardson (born 1959), Swedish actress
- Marie Riedeselle (died 1915), Canadian-born American bicyclist, dress designer, osteopath, hiker and hermit
- Marie Řihošková, Czech slalom canoeist
- Marie Rimmer (born 1947), British Labour politician
- Marie Ringheim (born 1999), Norwegian singer-songwriter
- Marie Catherine Riollet (1755–1788), French engraver
- Marie Riou (born 1981), French sailor
- Marie Risby (born 1955), Swedish cross-country skier
- Marie Rivière (born 1956), French actress and filmmaker
- Marie Robards (born 1976), American murderer
- Marie Robertson (born 1977), Swedish actress
- Marie Robertson (activist), Canadian LGBT rights activist
- Marie Robine, French mystic
- Marie Rodell (1912–1975), American novelist
- Marie Roethlisberger (born 1966), American physician and gymnast
- Marie Rogissart (1841–1929), militant French feminist
- Marie Rognes (born 1982), Norwegian mathematician
- Marie de Rohan (died 1679), French courtier
- Marie Rokkones Hansen (born 2000), Norwegian handball player
- Marie de Romieu (1545–1590), French poet
- Marie Rønningen (born 1994), Norwegian sailor
- Marie Røpke (born 1987), Danish badminton player
- Marie Roumy, Cameroonian nun
- Marie Rovsing (1814–1888), Danish women's rights activist
- Marie Royce, American diplomat
- Marie Roze (1846–1926), French operatic soprano
- Marie Rudisill (1911–2006), American author, TV personality and aunt of Truman Capote
- Marie M. Runyon (1915–2018), American politician
- Marie Russak (1865–1945), American architect
- Marie Booth Russell (c. 1874–1911), English actress
- Marie Magdalena Rustad (1859–1943), Norwegian court official
- Marie Rutkoski (born 1977), American writer
- Marie Růžičková (born 1986), Slovak basketball player
- Marie Chantal Rwakazina, Rwandan politician
- Marie Ryan (disambiguation)

== S ==
- Marie du Saar (1860–1955), Dutch ophthalmologist
- Marie Sabouret (1924–1960), French actress
- Marie Saine-Firdaus (born 1973), Gambian lawyer and politician
- Marie Salander (born 1985), Swedish footballer
- Marie Sallé (1709–1756), French ballet dancer
- Marie Samuelsson (born 1956), Swedish composer
- Marie Sanderson (1921–2010), Canadian climatologist
- Marie Sandholt (1872–1942), Danish painter and ceramicist
- Marie Sapienza, American politician
- Marie Philibert Constant Sappey (1810–1896), French anatomist
- Marie Sara (born 1964), French bullfighter
- Marie Sarr Mbodj (born 1935), Senegalese government minister
- Marie Sasse (1834–1907), Belgian operatic soprano
- Marie Savard (1936–2012), Canadian poet and playwright
- Marie Emmanuel Augustin Savard (1861–1942), French composer
- Marie Gabriel Augustin Savard (1814–1881), French composer and teacher
- Marie Jules César Savigny (1777–1851), French zoologist
- Marie Blandine Sawadogo, Burkinabé politician
- Marie Saxon (1904–1941), American actress
- Marie Say (1857–1943), French heiress and socialite
- Marie Charlotte Schaefer (1874–1927), Texas physician and medical school faculty member
- Marie Schauff, German composer
- Marie Scheublé, French classical violinist
- Marie Schlei (1919–1983), German politician
- Marie von Schleinitz (1842–1912), German salonnière
- Marie Schmidt (1895–1971), German political activist and politician
- Marie Schmolka (1893–1940), Czech-Jewish humanitarian
- Marie Schneiderová-Zubaníková, Czech civil engineer and architect, first woman to qualify as a civil engineer in Czechoslovakia
- Marie Schnür (1869–?), German painter
- Marie Beatrice Schol-Schwarz (1898–1969), Dutch phytopathologist
- Marie Schölzel (born 1997), German volleyball player
- Marie Schönfeld (1898–1944), Austrian government worker and anti-Nazi resistance activist
- Marie Schreiber (born 2003), Luxembourgish cyclist
- Marie Schubert (1890–1983), American commercial artist and illustrator of children's books
- Marie Sebag (born 1986), French chess grandmaster
- Marie Šechtlová (1928–2008), Czech photographer
- Marie Šedivá (1908–1975), Czech fencer
- Marie Seebach (1829–1897), German actress
- Marie Selby (1885–1971), American philanthropist
- Marie Danielle Selvon, Mauritian barrister
- Marie Semoes, Indian high jumper
- Marie Senghor Basse (1930–2019), Senegalese physician
- Marie Seong-Hak Kim (born 1958), South Korean legal historian
- Marie Serneholt (born 1983), Swedish actress, model, and singer
- Marie Sester, French-American artist
- Marie Seurat (born 1949), Syrian novelist
- Marie Severin (1929–2018), American comic book artist
- Marie Seyrat (born 1982), French singer
- Marie Shannon, New Zealand artist, art photographer and teacher
- Marie Sharp, Belizean businesswoman
- Marie Shear (1940–2017), American feminist writer
- Marie Sherlock, Irish politician
- Marie Shotwell (1880–1934), American actress
- Marie Shroff, New Zealand public servant
- Marie Siegling (1824–1920), American classical composer
- Marie Silin (born 1979), French politician
- Marie Silkeberg (born 1961), Swedish writer
- Marie da Silva, Malawian AIDS activist
- Marie Simon (1824–1877), German nurse
- Marie Celeste Simon, American biologist and cancer researcher
- Marie Simonsen (born 1962), Norwegian journalist
- Marie Sirois (1865–1920), French-Canadian strongwoman
- Marie Madoé Sivomey (1923–2008), Togolese politician
- Marie Sizun (born 1940), French writer
- Marie Skammelsen (born 2001), Danish gymnast
- Marie Skau (1890–1966), Norwegian politician
- Marie Skodak Crissey (1910–2000), American psychologist
- Marie Slater, British reality television personality
- Marie Šmídová (table tennis) (1907–1963), Czech table tennis player
- Marie Šmídová (handballer) (born 1966), Czech handball player
- Marie Smith (disambiguation)
- Marie Tourell Søderberg (born 1988), Danish actress
- Marie Söderström-Lundberg (born 1960), Swedish long-distance runner
- Marie Solberg (born 1988), Norwegian sailor
- Marie Soldat-Roeger (1863–1955), Austrian musician
- Marie Julia Cérre Soulard (1775–1845), American landowner
- Marie Spartali Stillman (1844–1927), English painter
- Marie St. Fleur (born 1962), American politician
- Marie Elyse St. George (born 1929), Canadian artist and poet
- Marie Michele St. Louis (born 1968), Mauritian judoka
- Marie Staal (1806–1871), Norwegian-Danish stage actress
- Marie Šťastná (born 1981), Czech poet
- Marie von Stedingk (1799–1868), Swedish composer and courtier
- Marie Steichen, American politician
- Marie Henriette Steil (1898–1930), Luxembourg writer and feminist
- Marie Stephan (born 1996), French squash player
- Marie Stewart (disambiguation)
- Marie Steiner-von Sivers (1867–1948), Baltic German actress
- Marie Stiborová (1950–2020), Czech politician
- Marie Stopes (1880–1958), British birth control campaigner and paleobotanist
- Marie Storms (1885–?), Belgian tennis player
- Marie Strinden, American politician
- Marie Stritt (1855–1928), German feminist
- Marie Jackson Stuart (1878–1925), Black American suffragist
- Marie Stubbs (born 1939), British educator and academic
- Marie Studholme (1872–1930), English actress and singer
- Marie Suize, French gold miner and businesswoman
- Marie Sukers, South African politician
- Marie Sundelius (1882–1958), American opera singer
- Marie Surcouf (1863–1928), French balloonist and feminist
- Marie H. Suthers (1895–1983), American politician and educator
- Marie Svan (born 1963), Swedish cross-country skier
- Marie Svensson (born 1967), Swedish table tennis player
- Marie Sýkorová (1952–2018), Czech field hockey player
- Marie Syrkin (1899–1989), American writer

== T ==
- Marie Josée Ta Lou-Smith, Ivorian sprinter
- Marie Taglioni (1804–1884), Italian ballet dancer
- Marie Takvam (1926–2008), Norwegian writer
- Marie Tamarelle-Verhaeghe (born 1962), French politician
- Marie Tannæs (1854–1939), Norwegian artist
- Marie Tansey (1930–2016), American politician
- Marie Laure Tardieu (1902–1998), French botanist
- Marie Tayau (1855–1892), French musician
- Marie Taylor (mycologist) (1930–1999), New Zealand botanist, mycologist and scientific illustrator
- Marie Taylor (1911–1990), American botanist
- Marie Tehan (1940–2004), Australian politician and lawyer
- Marie Tempest (1864–1942), English singer and comic actress
- Marie Tepe (1834–1901), Vivandière in the Union Army
- Marie Texier-Lahoulle (1889–1972), French politician
- Marie Tharp (1920–2006), American oceanographer and cartographer
- Marie José Thériault (born 1945), Canadian writer, performer and translator
- Marie Thibault, Canadian rugby player
- Marie Thomas (1896–1966), Indonesian physician
- Marie Tidball, British academic and politician
- Marie Tiffany (1881–1948), American opera singer
- Marie Tifo (born 1949), Canadian actress
- Marie Adèle Pierre Jules Tissot (1838–1883), French mining engineer and geologist
- Marie Tomášová (1929–2025), Czech actress
- Marie Tømmerbakke (born 1993), Norwegian handball player
- Marie Toms (born 1979), British water skier
- Marie Toole (1926–2021), Canadian curler
- Marie Toomey (1923–2014), Australian tennis player
- Marie Toussaint (born 1987), French politician
- Marie Townsend, American author and composer
- Marie Trintignant (1962–2003), French actress
- Marie Troillet (born 1983), Swiss ski mountaineer
- Marie Tuck (1866–1947), South Australian artist and art educator
- Marie Tulip (1935–2015), Australian feminist
- Marie Tumba Nzeza, Congolese politician
- Marie Tůmová, Czech women's suffragist and teacher
- Marie Tussaud (1761–1850), French artist

== U ==
- Marie Ueda (born 1990), Japanese singer and songwriter
- Marie Louise Uhr (1923–2001), Australian biologist and Catholic feminist
- Marie Béatrice Umutesi (born 1959), Rwandan writer
- Marie Under (1883–1980), Estonian poet

== V ==
- Marie Van Tassell (1871–1946), American actress
- Marie Léonie Vanhoutte (1888–1967), French resister and secret agent during World War II
- Marie Catherine Vasa, Polish noblewoman
- Marie Vassilieff (1884–1957), Russian painter
- Marie Vermeulin (born 1983), French classical pianist
- Marie Vernier (1590–1627), French actress
- Marie Vernet (1825–1898), French fashion model and businesswoman
- Marie Versini (1940–2021), French actress
- Marie Vibbert (born 1974), American science fiction author
- Marie Vien, Canadian screenwriter
- Marie Vieux-Chauvet (1916–1973), Haitian writer
- Marie Vigoreaux (died 1679), French fortune teller and poisoner
- Marie de Villepin (born 1986), French model, actress and singer
- Marie Vilmann (born 1993), Danish cyclist
- Marie Vinck, Belgian actress
- Marie Violay, French expert in rock mechanics
- Marie A. Vitulli (born 1949), American mathematician
- Marie Vorobieff (1892–1984), Russian painter
- Marie Vuillemin (1889–1963), Belgian anarchist

== W ==
- Marie Wackwitz (1865–1930), German politician
- Marie Wagner (1883–1975), American tennis player
- Marie Wahlgren, Swedish academic and politician
- Marie Waife (1892–1985), American writer
- Marie Wainwright (1853–1923), American actress
- Marie Walcamp (1894–1936), American actress
- Marie Waldron (born 1960), American politician
- Marie Walewska (1786–1817), Polish countess belonging to inner circle of Napoleon Bonaparte
- Marie Wall (born 1992), Swedish handball player
- Marie Wallace (born 1939), American stage and television actress
- Marie Wallin, British fibre artist
- Marie Walterová, Czechoslovak table tennis player
- Marie Walther (born 1944), American gymnast
- Marie Walton-Mahon, Australian ballet dancer and teacher
- Marie Wandscheer (1856–1936), Dutch artist
- Marie van Waning-Stevels (1874–1943), Dutch artist
- Marie Wann (1911–1996), American statistician
- Marie Wasem (born 1995), German politician
- Marie Wattel (born 1997), French swimmer
- Marie Weaver, American artist
- Marie Weckerle, Luxembourgish tennis player
- Marie Wegener (born 2001), German singer
- Marie Wegman (1925–2004), baseball player
- Marie Weibull Kornias, Swedish politician
- Marie Johanna Weiss (1903–1952), American mathematician
- Marie Wennersten-From (born 1958), Swedish professional golfer
- Marie Wexelsen (1832–1911), Norwegian educator, poet, children's writer and economist
- Marie Lovise Widnes (1930–2021), Norwegian poet and politician
- Marie Wieck (1832–1916), German pianist, singer and composer
- Marie Wiegmann (1820–1893), German painter
- Marie Wilcox (disambiguation)
- Marie Willeboordse (1902–1989), Dutch artist
- Marie Williams (disambiguation)
- Marie Wilson (disambiguation)
- Marie Wilt (1840–1891), Austrian opera singer
- Marie Wimer (1876–1965), American tennis player
- Marie Windsor (1919–2000), American actress
- Marie Remington Wing (1885–1982), American politician
- Marie Winn, American ornithologist
- Marie Wittich (1862–1931), German operatic soprano
- Marie Wittman (1859–1913), French hysteria patient
- Marie Womplou (born 1969), Ivorian athlete
- Marie Wong, food technologist at Massey University
- Marie Woo (1928–2026), ceramicist
- Marie Woodson, American politician
- Marie Wright (disambiguation)
- Marie Wulf (1685–1738), Danish preacher
- Marie Wuytiers (1865–1944), Dutch artist

== Y ==
- Marie Yamaguchi (born 1989), Japanese rugby sevens player
- Marie Yanaka (born 1990), Japanese beauty pageant winner
- Marie Yassi (born 1985), Ivorian footballer
- Marie Yates (born 1940), British fine conceptual artist
- Marie Grice Young (1876–1959), American piano teacher who survived the sinking of the RMS Titanic
- Marie Yovanovitch (born 1958), Canadian American diplomat

== Z ==
- Marie van Zandt (1858–1919), American opera singer
- Marie van Zeggelen (1870–1957), Dutch writer, editor and painter
- Marie Zeigler (1937–2014), American professional baseball player
- Marie Zelenková, Czechoslovak table tennis player
- Marie Sidenius Zendt (1882–1968), American singer
- Marie Zettler (1885–1950), German politician and journalist
- Marie Zielcke (born 1979), German actress
- Marie Zimmerman (1879–1972), American designer and maker of jewelry and metalwork
- Marie Zinck (1789–1823), Danish actress and operatic soprano
- Marie van der Zyl, 48th President of the Board of Deputies of British Jews

== Fictional characters ==
=== Mononymous ===
- Marie, a minor character in the 2003 animated film Barbie of Swan Lake
- Marie (Centuria), fictional mother in the Japanese web manga Centuria
- Marie, mother of the titular character in Chi's Sweet Home
- Marie, a supporting character in the long-running soap opera EastEnders
- Marie, one of the lead title characters in the Netflix film Malcolm & Marie
- Ultrawoman Marie, better known as Mother of Ultra, from the Ultraman Series; true name revealed in the film Mega Monster Battle: Ultra Galaxy Legend
- Marie, in the movie Paulie
- Marie, occupant of the Velvet Room in the video game Persona 4 Golden
- Marie, the daughter of Duchess in the 1970 Disney animated film The Aristocats
- Marie, character in the Nadia: The Secret of Blue Water anime series
- Marie, in the video game Splatoon and its sequels Splatoon 2 and Splatoon 3
- Marie, the lover of Meursault who is the main character in Albert Camus' novel The Stranger
- Marie, name attributed to X-Men character Rogue in the films X-Men, X2: X-Men United, and X-Men: The Last Stand

=== With surname ===
- Marie Barone, a main character in the sitcom Everybody Loves Raymond
- Marie Brown, in the 2020 movie Christmas in the Rockies
- Marie Calvet, Megan Calvet Draper's mother in Mad Men
- Marie Carreau, French name of Mandy Flood from the animated series Fireman Sam
- Marie Gold (マリー・ゴールド), in Tokusou Sentai Dekaranger The Movie: Full Blast Action
- Marie Jones, in the movie Reviving Ophelia
- Marie Kanker, character in Ed, Edd n Eddy
- Marie Moreau, a main character in the television series Gen V
- Marie Parfacy, real name of the character Soma Peries in the Gundam anime series Mobile Suit Gundam 00
- Marie Payne, in the video game series Poppy Playtime
- Marie Rose, in the video game series Dead or Alive
- Marie Schrader, in the television series Breaking Bad
- Marie (Onegai), an anime character

== See also ==
- Marie (disambiguation)
- Marie (given name)
- Sainte-Marie (disambiguation)
