= Mario Ramírez =

Mario Ramírez may refer to:

- Mario Ramírez (baseball) (1957-2013), Puerto Rican baseball player
- Mario Ramírez (footballer) (born 1965), Paraguayan footballer
- Mario Ramírez Reyes (fl. 1990s), Mexican actor
- Mario Ramírez Treviño (1962–2025), Mexican suspected drug lord
- Mario Hernán Ramírez (1934–2023), Honduran historian and writer, 2017 Ramón Rosa National Literature Award

== See also ==
- Marie Ramírez, Costa Rican ten-pin bowler
- María Elena Ramírez (born 1951), Mexican gymnast
