= Marie Wilcox (disambiguation) =

Marie Wilcox (1933–2021) was a Native American who was the last fluent speaker of Wukchumni.

Marie Wilcox may also refer to:

- Marie S. Wilcox (died 1995), American teacher

== See also ==
- Mary Charlotte Wilcox (born 1947), Canadian actress
