= Marie Sapienza =

American politician

Member of New Hampshire House of Representatives for Rockingham 8
- In office 2010–2012
- Succeeded by: Jeffrey Oligny
- In office 1997–2002

Personal details
- Party: Republican
- Education: Phillips Academy Andover

Marie N. Sapienza is an American politician. She represented Rockingham County in the New Hampshire House of Representatives. She served four terms. She was unseated in the Republican primary in 2012. She attended Phillips Academy Andover.
