= Marie Maclean =

Australian scholar of French literature

Marie Maclean FAHA
- Born: 1928; London, England
- Died: 23 November 1994 (aged 65–66)

Academic background
- Education: University of Melbourne
- Thesis: Le Grande Meaulnes d'Alain-Fournier: Etude structurale et thematique (MA) (1971)

Academic work
- Institutions: Monash University

Marie Ursula Maclean FAHA (1928 – 23 November 1994) was an Australian scholar of French literature. She is best known for her book The Name of the Mother: Writing Illegitimacy and for her dedication as a teacher.

Maclean was born in England in 1928 but moved to Melbourne in 1939, where she completed high school at Melbourne Girls' Grammar School. Winner of two scholarships, she graduated from the University of Melbourne in 1948 with a BA (Hons) in French and Latin.

In 1971, Maclean was awarded an MA by the University of Melbourne for her thesis Le Grande Meaulnes d'Alain-Fournier: Etude structurale et thématique, which was published by the Paris publishing house José Corti two years later. New Zealand academic A. S. G. Butler wrote: "I found this a most readable and even exciting study, not only for its treatment of the novel under consideration but also for the insights it suggests into other works probably influenced by it".

Her career as an academic began in the 1960s when she worked as part-time tutor. In 1965 she moved to Monash University as tutor. The next 30 years saw her promoted to senior tutor (1973), rising to associate professor in 1989. The onset of cancer forced her to retire in 1993. Despite this, she remained committed to the postgraduate students she was supervising and to academics with whom she collaborated.

Maclean was elected a Fellow of the Australian Academy of the Humanities in 1992.

Her life's work was celebrated in Telling Performances: Essays on gender, narrative and performance, edited by three former colleagues, Brian Nelson, Anne Freadman and Philip Anderson, which was published in 2001. The book's introduction acknowledged her profound effect on their own work and included a bibliography of her books, chapter contributions and significant articles. It also included the transcript of a letter from French philosopher Jacques Derrida, who wrote to Maclean after reading The Name of the Mother and on receiving news of her cancer diagnosis. He wrote that he found it "powerful, lucid, and original" and covering "a very rich and varied corpus, pursuing in a coherent manner, across abysses and through labyrinths, the dizzying question of legitimation or illegitimacy". He concluded by expressing "the joy with which I discovered your magnificent book" which he planned to reread as it would be "a work of reference from now on, and not just for me".

== Selected works ==
- Maclean, Marie (1973), Le jeu suprême: Structure et thèmes dans "Le grand Meaulnes'", José Corti
- Maclean, Marie (January 1988), Narrative as performance the Baudelairean experiment, Routledge (published 1988), ISBN 978-0-415-00663-7
- Maclean, Marie (1994), The name of the mother: Writing illegitimacy, Routledge, ISBN 978-0-415-10686-3

== Personal and death ==
She married Hector Maclean, a German scholar. They had three sons. She died of cancer on 23 November 1994.
