= Marie Violay =

French expert in rock mechanics (born 1984)

Professor Marie Violay
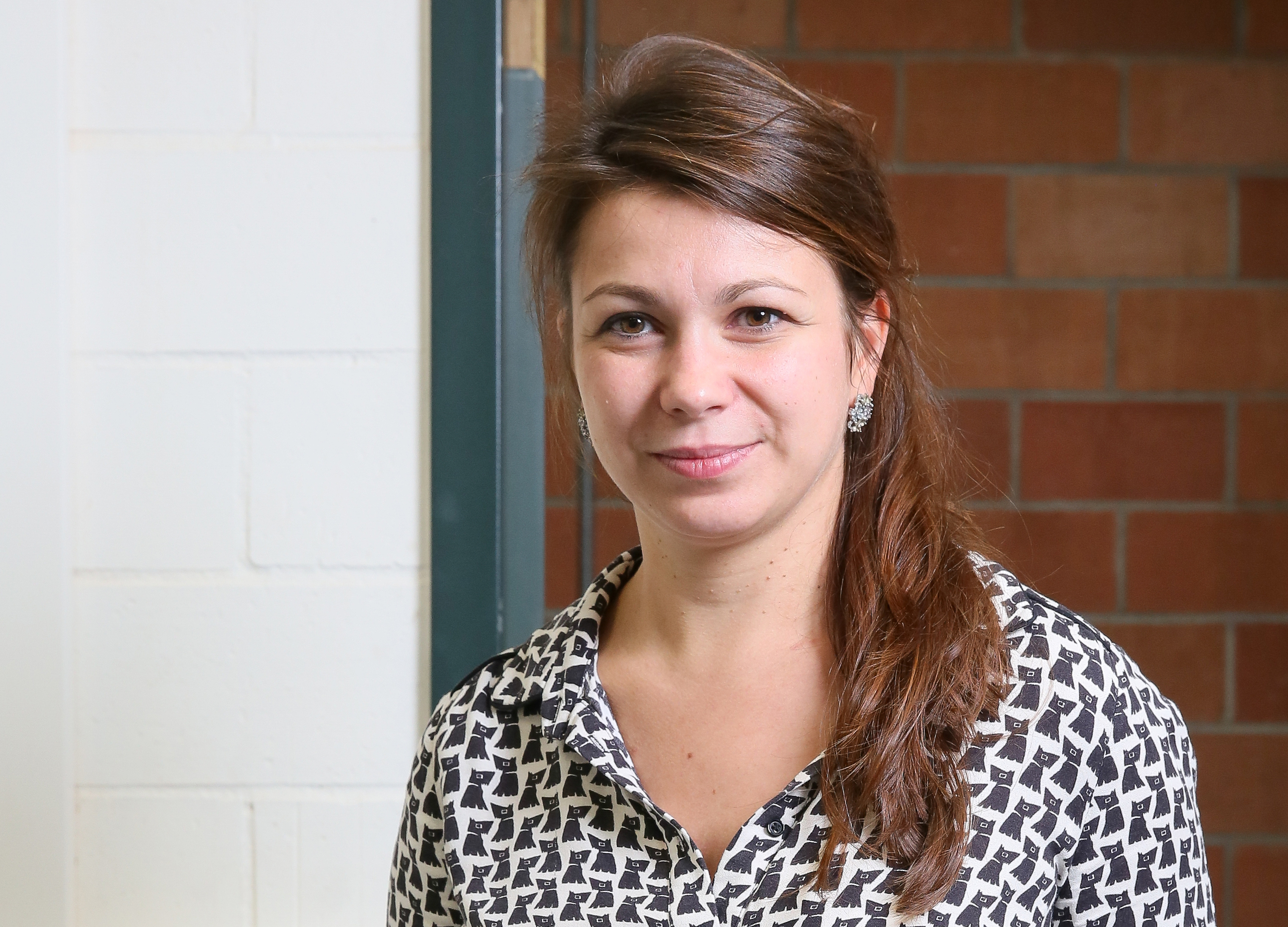
- Marie Violay in 2017
- Born: 1984 (age 41–42)

Academic background
- Education: Montpellier University; National Institute of Geophysics and Volcanology; ETH Zurich
- Thesis: Réservoirs hydro-géothermaux haute enthalpie : apport des propriétés pétrophysiques des basaltes (2010)
- Doctoral advisor: Philippe Pezard

Academic work
- Institutions: EPFL (École Polytechnique Fédérale de Lausanne)
- Website: https://www.epfl.ch/labs/lemr/

Marie Violay (born 1984) is a French expert in rock mechanics. She is an assistant professor and the head of the Laboratory of Experimental Rock Mechanics at EPFL (École Polytechnique Fédérale de Lausanne). She teaches rock mechanics, geophysics for engineers and geology.

== Career and research ==
Violay completed her PhD at the Geoscience faculty of the Montpellier University in 2010 with her thesis "High enthalpy hydro-geothermal reservoirs : insights from basalt petrophysical properties" (Réservoirs hydro-géothermaux haute enthalpie : apport des propriétés pétrophysiques des basaltes). She then was a research assistant at National Institute of Geophysics and Volcanology in Rome and at ETH Zurich.

In 2015 she was appointed assistant professor and head of the Laboratory of Experimental Rock Mechanics at EPFL and was awarded one of the seven Energy grant of the SNSF (Swiss National Science Foundation). These grants are aimed at promoting young scientists in the field of energy research.

In 2017, Violay was awarded the ERC Starting Grant in the area of Earth System Science (Physical Sciences and Engineering domain). The grants are awarded under the "excellent science" pillar of Horizon 2020.

The focus of Violay's research is to better understand the mechanical and physical processes in the first kilometers of the Earth's crust. She brings better understanding on how fluids and rocks interact at these depths, which is crucial for the development of deep geothermal energy production. Understanding earthquake nucleation and propagation are other focuses of her work. She has developed new approaches combining experimental deformation microstructural studies of the micro-scale processes, and modelling of these processes for the study of earthquakes and geological reservoirs. She has reproduced seismic slip deformation conditions in the presence of pore fluids under controlled conditions, providing thus the experimental evidence of thermomechanical pressurisation of faults at seismic deformation conditions.

== Awards and honors ==
- Violay was awarded the 2017 Division Outstanding Early Career Scientist Award of the European Geoscience Union.
- She was awarded the Civil Engineering Institute Best Teacher award 2017 at EPFL

== Selected publications ==
- Violay, Marie; Gibert, Benoit; Mainprice, David; Evans, Brian; Dautria, Jean-Marie; Azais, Pierre; Pezard, Philippe (2012). "An experimental study of the brittle-ductile transition of basalt at oceanic crust pressure and temperature conditions". Journal of Geophysical Research: Solid Earth. 117 (B3): B03213. Bibcode:2012JGRB..117.3213V. doi:10.1029/2011JB008884. hdl:1721.1/106335. S2CID 53585977.
- Violay, M.; Nielsen, S.; Gibert, B.; Spagnuolo, E.; Cavallo, A.; Azais, P.; Vinciguerra, S.; Di Toro, G. (2014). "Effect of water on the frictional behavior of cohesive rocks during earthquakes". Geology. 42 (1): 27–30. Bibcode:2014Geo....42...27V. doi:10.1130/G34916.1.
- Violay, M.; Nielsen, S.; Spagnuolo, E.; Cinti, D.; Di Toro, G.; Di Stefano, G. (2013). "Pore fluid in experimental calcite-bearing faults: Abrupt weakening and geochemical signature of co-seismic processes". Earth and Planetary Science Letters. 361: 74–84. Bibcode:2013E&PSL.361...74V. doi:10.1016/j.epsl.2012.11.021.
- Violay, M.; Gibert, B.; Mainprice, D.; Burg, J.-P. (2015). "Brittle versus ductile deformation as the main control of the deep fluid circulation in oceanic crust". Geophysical Research Letters. 42 (8): 2767–2773. Bibcode:2015GeoRL..42.2767V. doi:10.1002/2015GL063437. hdl:20.500.11850/100896.
- Violay, M.; Heap, M. J.; Acosta, M.; Madonna, C. (2017). "Porosity evolution at the brittle-ductile transition in the continental crust: Implications for deep hydro-geothermal circulation". Scientific Reports. 7 (1): 7705. Bibcode:2017NatSR...7.7705V. doi:10.1038/s41598-017-08108-5. PMC 5550508. PMID 28794474.
