= Marie Le Gendre =

16th-century French humanist

Marie Le Gendre, Dame de Rivery, was a 16th-century French humanist, poet and writer on moral philosophy, associated with the late-16th-century revival of Stoicism.

== Life ==
Little is known of Marie Le Gendre's life. She may have come from Picardy, and seems to have had some association with aristocratic circles: she dedicated L'exercice de l'âme vertueuse to the Princess of Conti, Jeanne-Françoise de Coeme, Lady of Lucé and Bonnétable; several sonnets and a dialogue were addressed to François Le Poulchre, a soldier and writer from western France. Le Poulchre's diary notes Le Gendre as an erudite lady, alongside Madeleine de l’Aubespine, Claude Catherine de Clermont, Diane d'Andoins, Madeleine Des Roches and Catherine Des Roches.

The authorship of Des saines affections is disputed, with recent scholars attributing authorship to Madeleine de l'Aubespine.

== Works ==
- Cabinet des saines affections [Cabinet of healthy affections], 1584.
- L'exercice de l'âme vertueuse [The practice of the chaste soul], 1596/1597.
