= Marie Lindberg =

Marie Lindberg may refer to:

- Marie Lindberg (cyclist), Swedish road cyclist
- Marie Lindberg (singer), Swedish schoolteacher, singer/songwriter and guitarist
- Marie Louise Lindberg, mineralogist
