= Marie Gabrielle Mfegue =

Cameroonian journalist

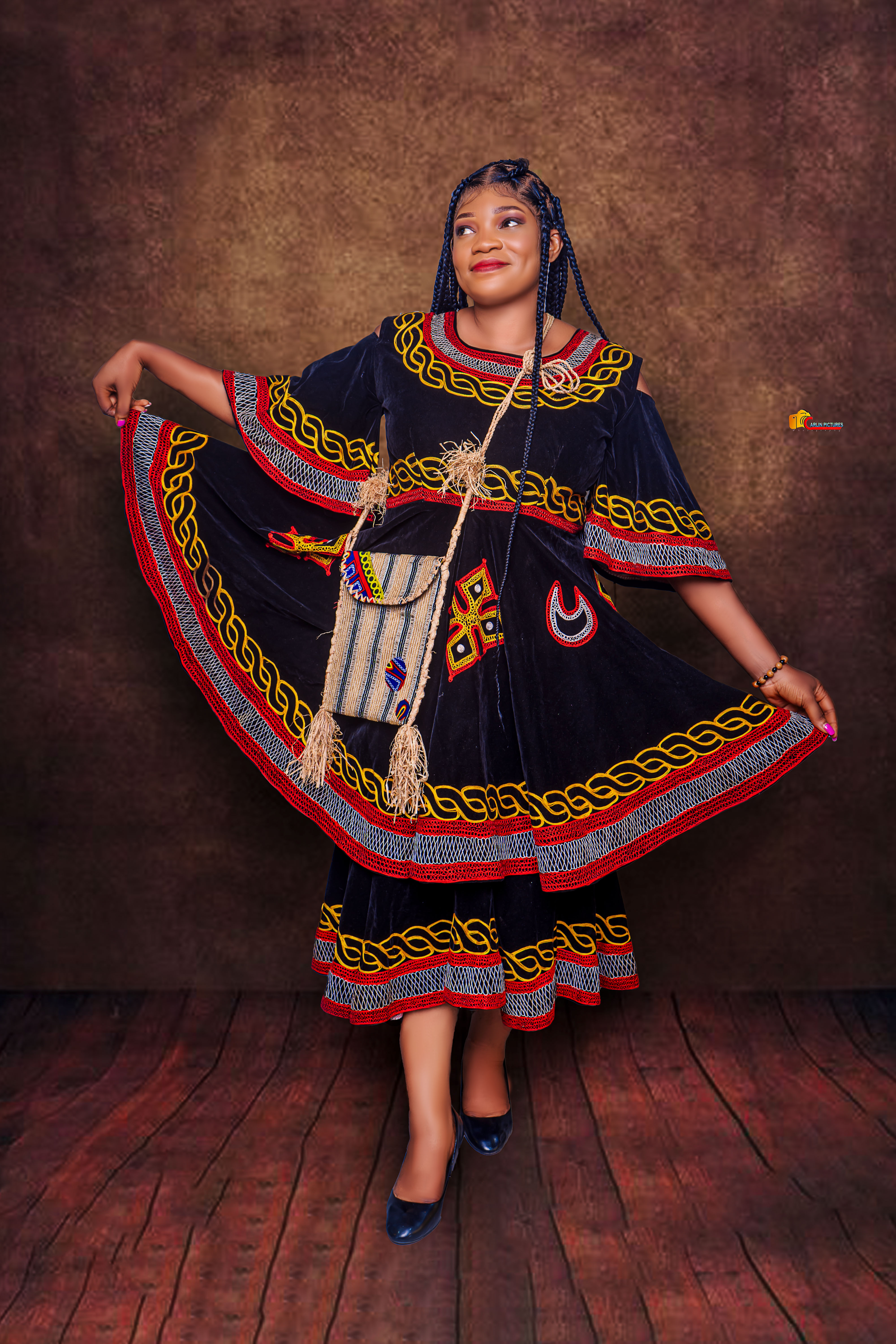
- Born: Cameroon
- Occupation: Cultural journalist

Marie Gabrielle Mfegue is a Cameroonian cultural journalist. She serves as the head of the culture and society department at the regional station of CRTV-Littoral in Cameroon.

== Biography ==
Marie Gabrielle Mfegue is originally from Cameroon and a graduate of the ESSTIC (École Supérieure des Sciences et Techniques de l'Information et de la Communication) in Yaoundé, Cameroon.

In 2008, Marie Gabrielle Mfegue joined CRTV as support staff, and in 2015, she was recruited. She presents daily in the news editions and various magazines of the CRTV network. As the regional delegate of RJ2C, she was appointed head of the culture and society department of CRTV-Littoral on March 14, 2023.

== Awards and recognition ==
She received the award for the best literary program with her show "Au fil des pages".

- 2023: Award for Best Radio Journalist by The Public Vision Awards
- 2022: Award for Best Cultural Journalist by Best Talents Cameroon
