= Marie Bernard (disambiguation) =

Marie Bernard is a scientist.

Marie Bernard may also refer to:

- Marie Bernard (composer) (born 1951), Canadian composer who won at the 12th Genie Awards
- Marie Bernard (child saint) on List of child saints
- Sister Mary Bernard or Bernadette Soubirous, saint
- Marie Françoise Bernard (1819–1901), French anti-vivisection campaigner
