= Marie Régnier =

French writer (1840–1887)

Marie Régnier (July 11, 1840, in Paris – March 18, 1887, in Paris) was a French writer; a friend of Gustave Flaubert, she exchanged many letters with him.

She wrote under the penname of Daniel Darc.

== Life ==
Born Marie-Sidonie Serrure, she married in 1861 Raoul-Emmanuel Régnier, a doctor, and went to live with him at Mantes-la-Jolie; she came back to live in Paris in 1881.

She was a regular contributor to the daily newspaper Le Figaro.

== Works ==
- Une aventure d'hier (1870) (under the pen name Daniel Darcey) (Paul Ollendorff, 1885)
- Revanche posthume (1878)
- Les Rieuses (Comédie) (1878 [1886])
- La Princesse Méduse (Paris, 1880), with illustrations by Félix Régamey and his brother Frédéric Régamey

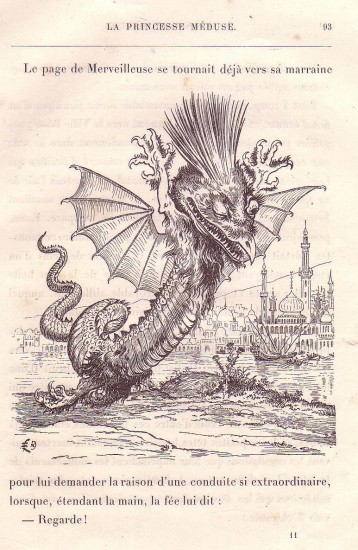
Illustration by Félix et Frédéric Régamey from Daniel Darc's book, La Princesse Méduse (Paris, 1880)

- Un duel de salon
- Les folies de Valentine (drama) (1880)
- Le Péché d'une vierge (1881)
- La couleuvre (1882)
- Petit Bréviaire du Parisien, dictionnaire humoristique (1883)
- Voilà le plaisir, Mesdames (Short stories) (1883)
- Voyage autour du bonheur (1884)
- Canifs et contrat (Short stories) (1884)
- Sagesse de poche, maximes et pensées
- Joyeuse Vie. Polygamie parisienne (1886).
- Les femmes inquiétantes et Les maris comiques. Suivis de Les anges du foyer, with illustrations by Godefroy (1886)

== Bibliography ==
- Émile Gérard-Gailly, Flaubert et Daniel Darc (1934) (22p.) (second edition in Le grand amour de Flaubert (1944), p. 229-256)
