= Marie of Savoy =

Marie of Savoy may refer to:

- Marie of Savoy, Baroness of Faucigny (1298–1336), daughter of Amadeus V, Count of Savoy; wife of Hugues de La Tour du Pin, Baron de Faucigny
- Marie of Savoy, Duchess of Milan (1411–1469), daughter of Amadeus VIII, Duke of Savoy; wife of Filippo Maria Visconti
- Marie of Savoy, Countess of Saint-Pol (1448–1475), daughter of Louis, Duke of Savoy; wife of Louis de Luxembourg, Count of Saint-Pol
- Marie of Savoy, Margravine of Baden-Hochberg (1455–1511), daughter of Amadeus IX, Duke of Savoy; wife of Philip, Margrave of Baden-Hochberg
- Marie Adélaïde of Savoy (1685–1712), Duchess of Burgundy and Dauphine of France

== See also ==
- Princess Maria Francesca of Savoy (1914–2001), daughter of Victor Emmanuel III of Italy and Elena of Montenegro
