= Marie Armande Jeanne Gacon-Dufour =

French writer and economist (1753-1835)

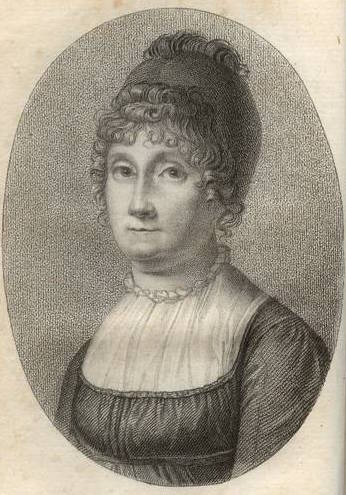

Marie Armande Jeanne Gacon-Dufour (1753-1835) was a French economist and writer.
