= Marie Muller =

Marie Muller or Marie Müller may refer to:

- Marie Müller (artist) (1847–1935), Austrian painter
- Marie Müller (footballer) (born 2000), German footballer
- Marie Muller (judoka) (born 1985), Luxembourger judoka
- Marie Muller-Lulofs (1854–1954), Dutch social reformer and social worker
