= Marie Mongan =

American educator and writer

Marie F. Mongan (February 1, 1933 – June 17, 2019) was an American educator and writer known for the Mongan method.

== Early life and family ==
Mongan was born as Marie Madeline Flanagan as in San Diego on 1 February 1933. Her father, Patrick Flanagan, was in Navy and her mother, Marie Flanagan, was a seamstress. She was educated at the Plymouth State University.

Mongan first marriage was with Gerald Bilodeau, whom she married in 1954 and separated in 1966. In 1970, she married Eugene Mongan and remained married until his death in 2013.

== Career ==
In 1992, her book, titled HypnoBirthing: The Mongan Method was published.

In 2000, she founded the HypnoBirthing Institute.

Mongan died on 17 June 2019 due to Sjögren syndrome.

== Bibliography ==
- HypnoBirthing: The Mongan Method
