= Marie Schmidt =

German political activist and politician (1895–1971)

Marie Schmidt (born Marie Kuhn; 10 February 1895 – 14 June 1971) was a German political activist and politician. (KPD). During the politically dead-locked period directly before the Hitler government took power in Berlin she became a Communist member of the parliament ("Landtag") of the People's State of Hesse ("Volksstaat Hessen").

== Biography ==
=== Provenance and early years ===
Marie Kuhn was born in Egelsbach, at that time a small town a short distance to the north of Darmstadt. Her mother was Elizabeth. Her father Heinrich Kühn (1849–1929) was a farmer who became the father of seven daughters: Marie was the sixth. On 23 April 1914 Marie Kuhn married the plasterer Adolf Theodor Schmidt (1890–1943).

=== Politics ===
During the war, which broke out a little more than three months later, Marie and Adolf Schmidt were both deeply involved with the "proletarian" peace movement. She was an early member of the Communist Party of Germany which in 1918/19 emerged from it. In her home community, she was elected to become a member of the Egelsbach local council. She also made her mark across Hesse more widely, gaining a reputation as an effective and aggressive public speaker representing the Hesse Communist Party, and acquiring the soubriquet "Rote Marie" ("Red Mary").

During 1931/32, Schmidt served as one of just three women members of the 70-seat Hesse state parliament ("Landtag"). Having secured her seat in the election of 15 November 1931 she made just one brief speech in the chamber. That was in February 1932 when she contributed to a debate over a government bill.

In March 1933, following the National Socialist take-over in January 1933, Schmidt and her husband were arrested in the aftermath of the Reichstag fire. They were detained for several weeks and then released. Under the dictatorship the Communist Party and political activism were banned. After 1945, Schmidt, by now a widow, rejoined the Communist Party, but with Communism now seen increasingly as a proxy for Soviet expansionist ambitions the party no longer enjoyed significant support in what became, in 1949, the German Federal Republic (West Germany). Marie Schmidt withdrew from public political engagement. Nevertheless, after the Communist Party had been banned by the West German Constitutional Court in 1956, and then, as Cold War concerns began to recede, quietly relaunched with a new name in 1968, Marie Schmidt (re)joined the "new" party.

=== Theo ===
The couple's son Theo evidently shared their political convictions. In 1934, he fled to the Saarland which remained under French military occupation. That meant there was little likelihood of close surveillance or sudden arrest by the German Security Services. In 1936, Theo went to Spain to fight for the "antifascist" International Brigades and was killed in 1937 during the fighting for Taragona.

=== Later years ===
After the death of her husband in 1943, Schmidt worked in a Frankfurt post office. She moved to live with her daughter Margot in nearby Neu-Isenburg in 1945. It was here that in 1971 she died.
