= Marie Cochran =

American artist, educator, and writer

Marie Toni Cochran
- Born: 1962 (age 63–64); Toccoa, Georgia
- Known for: mixed media

Marie T. Cochran (born 1962) is an American installation artist, educator, project strategist, art writer, and art curator. In 2020 to 2022, she was Lehman Brady Professor, at Duke University.

== Early life ==
She was born and raised in Toccoa, Georgia, a place Cochran refers to as "a special place." Her work centers issues of race and gender from an African-American perspective, and explores the dynamics of Affrilachia, referring to the history and culture of African-Americans and other people of color from the Appalachian region of the United States. In an interview Candice Dyer, Cochran says, in regard to Appalachia, that "People associate Blackness with Atlanta, Detroit, D.C., but we have it here in the mountains. We may be small, but we’re large in impact.”

== Education ==
Marie Cochran was born in Toccoa, Georgia in 1962. She earned a Bachelor of Fine Arts in Drawing and Painting from the University of Georgia in 1985, and in 1987, took a position as a visiting artist at Georgia Southern University. She was later awarded a Ford Foundation scholarship and earned a Master of Fine Arts in Fiber and Drawing/Painting from the School of the Art Institute of Chicago in 1992, where she then received a post-graduate NEA fellowship in museum education.

== Career ==
From 1992 until 1996, she was an assistant professor of art at Georgia Southern University. From 1996 to 2000, she served as an assistant professor of art at the University of Georgia. Cochran has been a visiting professor in a number of universities, including the University of Georgia, Prince George's Community College, and Western Carolina University. She was the Lehman Brady Professor at the Center for Documentary Studies at Duke University beginning in the fall semester 2020 through the spring semester of 2022. During Spring 2022, she taught an undergraduate and graduate course as the Lehman Brady Professor titled Black Spaces Matter: Race, Place, and Resilience.

Cochran also co-curated the inaugural museum exhibition of the Affrilachian Artist Project, at the August Wilson Cultural Center in Pittsburgh, an organization that promotes the concept of Affrilachia, and works with artists of color in Appalachia. She said that her goal with this project "was to create a sustainable collaborative network among the region’s artists and community organizers." The Affrilachian Artist Project "encompasses all forms of expression including music and literature."

== Art ==
She also was a resident artist at several universities: she would either travel to several locations with art, or it would give artists time to reflect and work outside their comfort zones. Most of this work took place in Asheville, North Carolina. Her work has been exhibited at the Studio Museum in Harlem, Spelman College, the High Museum of Art, and the Georgia Museum of Art.

Cochran had artwork included in the 2020 exhibition at Asheville Art Museum, Appalachia Now! An Interdisciplinary Survey of Contemporary Art in Southern Appalachia. The exhibition of 50 artists explored "the amalgamation of tradition and present-day perspectives extant in contemporary artistic representations of life in this region."

Cochran "uses visual art to convene partnerships that ignite collaboration." Some of her projects include, Kindred Vow, a multimedia installation piece, and Testify, Beyond Place, which Cochran produced and directed and created all the video/audio work for.

== Awards ==
Cochran has won many awards in her advocacy for the arts. She won the Cultural Olympiad Regional Designation Award from the Atlanta Cultural Olympics Committee in honor of the 1996 Summer Olympics. She also won the Georgia Council's Arts individual artist's grant; the Mid-Atlantic Arts Council's "Artist as a Catalyst" grant; the NEA/Southern Arts Federation Sculpture Fellowship and Fast Track Challenge Grant and the "We Shall Overcome Fund" by the Higherlander Center for Research and Education in New Market, Tennessee.

== Bibliography ==
- Farris, Phoebe, ed. (1999). Women Artists of Color: A Bio-Critical Sourcebook to 20th Century Artists in the Americas. Westport, CT: Greenwood Press. ISBN 0313303746.
- King-Hammond, Leslie, ed. (1995). Gumbo Ya Ya: Anthology of Contemporary African-American Women Artists. NY NY: Midmarch Arts Press.
- "Marie T. Cochran | Center for Documentary Studies at Duke University". documentarystudies.duke.edu. Retrieved 2021-03-09.
- Affrilachian Artist Project Pirate Queen Endigo Kat - Valeria Watson, Oct 1, 2012
