= Marie Dominique Luizet =

French botanist (1852–1930)

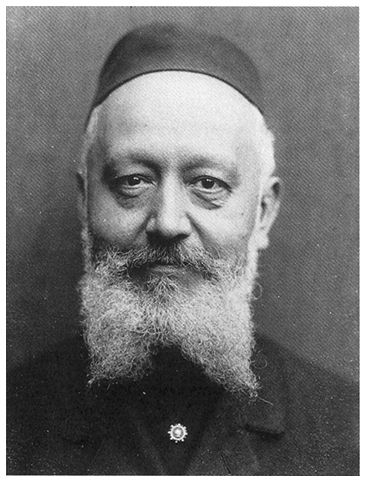
- Born: 1852
- Died: 1930 (aged 77–78)
- Known for: first to identify several species of Saxifraga
- Scientific career
- Fields: botany and chemistry

Marie Dominique Luizet (1852–1930) was a French botanist and chemist. He was the first to identify several species of Saxifraga.
