= Marie de Man =

Dutch numismatist, painter, draftsman, author (1855–1944)

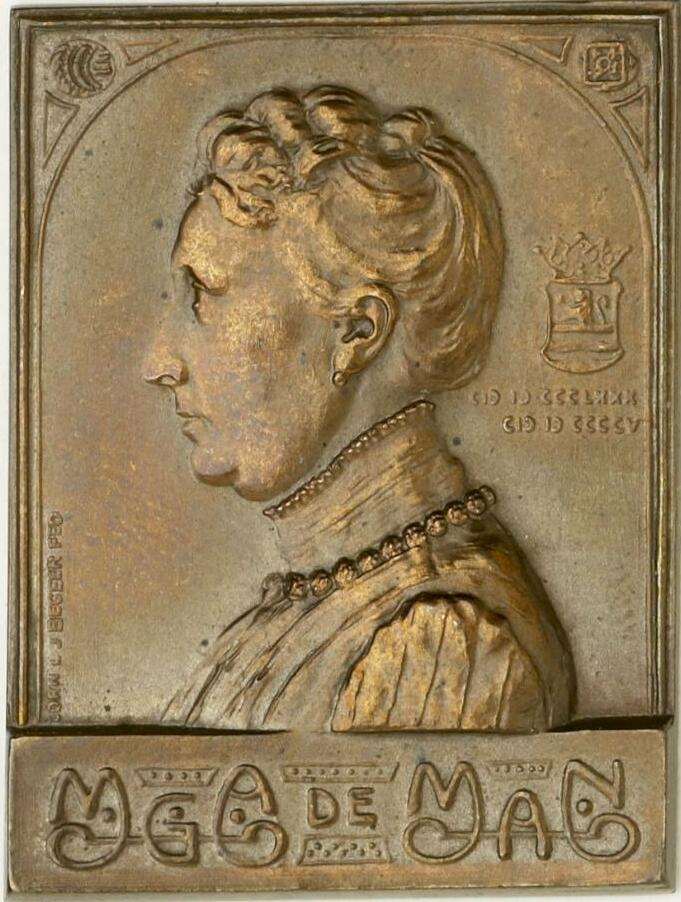
- Marie de Man (by CLJ Begeer)
- Born: Maria Goverdina Antonia de Man; 19 May 1855; Middelburg
- Died: 15 September 1944 (aged 89); Oegstgeest
- Occupations: Numismatist, curator, painter, draftsman, author

Marie de Man (born Maria Goverdina Antonia de Man, sometimes referred to as Marie G.A. de Man) (1855–1944) was a Dutch Zeeland numismatist, painter, draftsman, author and curator for the Royal Zeeland Society of Sciences. For many years, she was the only female member of the Royal Dutch Society for Coin and Medal Studies.

== Biography ==
Maria Goverdina Antonia de Man was born on 19 May 1855, in Middelburg to Dr. Jan Cornelis de Man and Neeltje Elisabeth Kamerman. She lived in the family home located on Lange Sint Pieterstraat for most of her life with her younger sister, Antoinette.

Marie de Man became deaf at a young age but was assisted by her sister for most of her life. Her father was a director of the Zeeland Society of Sciences and, inspired by him, she took an early interest in coins and medals. Their homeland in The Netherlands was a place that "had been inhabited since Roman times and where the Romans possessed an important base for their fleet, especially for trade with England. [It] is a rich site for coins, and particularly the beach of Domburg."

=== Curator ===
From 1889 to 1933, she served as curator of the Society's Numismatic Cabinet. The Society held an archaeologically rich collection of coins, the value of which increased significantly under Marie de Man's curatorship. In addition to her scientific duties, De Man also took on other tasks, such as organizing the Society's coin collections and creating an extensive catalogue in 1907.

De Man published many papers on numismatic and historical subjects. In 1885, she wrote her first numismatic study Le cimetière de Mariekerke (The cemetery of Mariekerke) in the journal of the Royal Belgian Numismatic Society. She was subsequently appointed foreign associate and in 1903, an honorary member of this Belgian circle. She published about a hundred articles on Zeeland coins and emergency coins and on coins found in Zeeland from the Roman period up to and including the Carolingian period.

De Man was a member of the Dutch Society for Coin and Medal Studies (KNGMP) from its founding in 1892; a year later she became an editor of the society's journal, which received the designation "Royal" in 1899. She donated a large part of her personal Domburg finds to the Society. She wrote more than 150 articles for the society's Yearbook. In 1905, De Man was presented with a plaque featuring her portrait, created by Cornelius L.J. Begeer, by (former) board members of the KNGMP on the occasion of her silver jubilee as curator. In 1917, she was appointed an honorary member of the Royal Netherlands Society for Numismatics.

In 1913, she wrote a book that explored the life and work of women in the Netherlands and its colonies, and she insisted that women had been important as society's medalists throughout the centuries.

According to one source, her love of coins lasted her whole life.

"However, her great love remained coins and tokens, particularly those of Zeeland. She published a separate study, 'Over Zeeuwsche loodjes' (1892), as a 'contribution to the numismatics of Zeeland'; in it, she described all the 'loodjes' known to her—that is, lead, but also copper or even silver coins that served as emergency money or proof of attendance, but which were usually melted down when they no longer needed to be used."

In 1922, she sold much of her own historical collection to the Royal Coin Cabinet.

=== Final years ===
On 19 May 1925, her scientific merits were celebrated on the occasion of her seventieth birthday with a special edition of her study on the Middelburg die cutter and engraver Johannes Looff. A commemorative medal was presented, designed by Roline Wichers Wierdsma. On the back was the engraving, "Mariae Goverdinae Antoniae de Man, aetis LXX, anno MCMXXV."

Marie de Man died suddenly in Oegstgeest or Leiden on 15 September 1944.

== Memberships ==
- Honorary member of the Belgian Société Royale de Numismatique
- Corresponding member of the Numismatischer Verein in Dresden
- Member of the Royal Dutch Society for Coin and Medal Studies, founded in 1892 (only female member for many years)
- Royal Antiquarian Society (1898)

== Selected publications ==
- On Zeeland lead tokens. Contribution to the numismatics of Zeeland (1892)
- What do we know about Dombourg Beach? (1899)
- Catalogue of the numismatic collection of the Zeeland Society of Sciences (1907)
- Some details about the gold and silversmiths' guild in Middelburg (1914)
- From the past of the Coin and Medal Cabinet of the Zeeland Society of Sciences (1919)
- The life and works of Johannes Looff, die cutter and engraver in Middelburg (1925)
