= Marie Peltier =

Belgian author (born 1980)

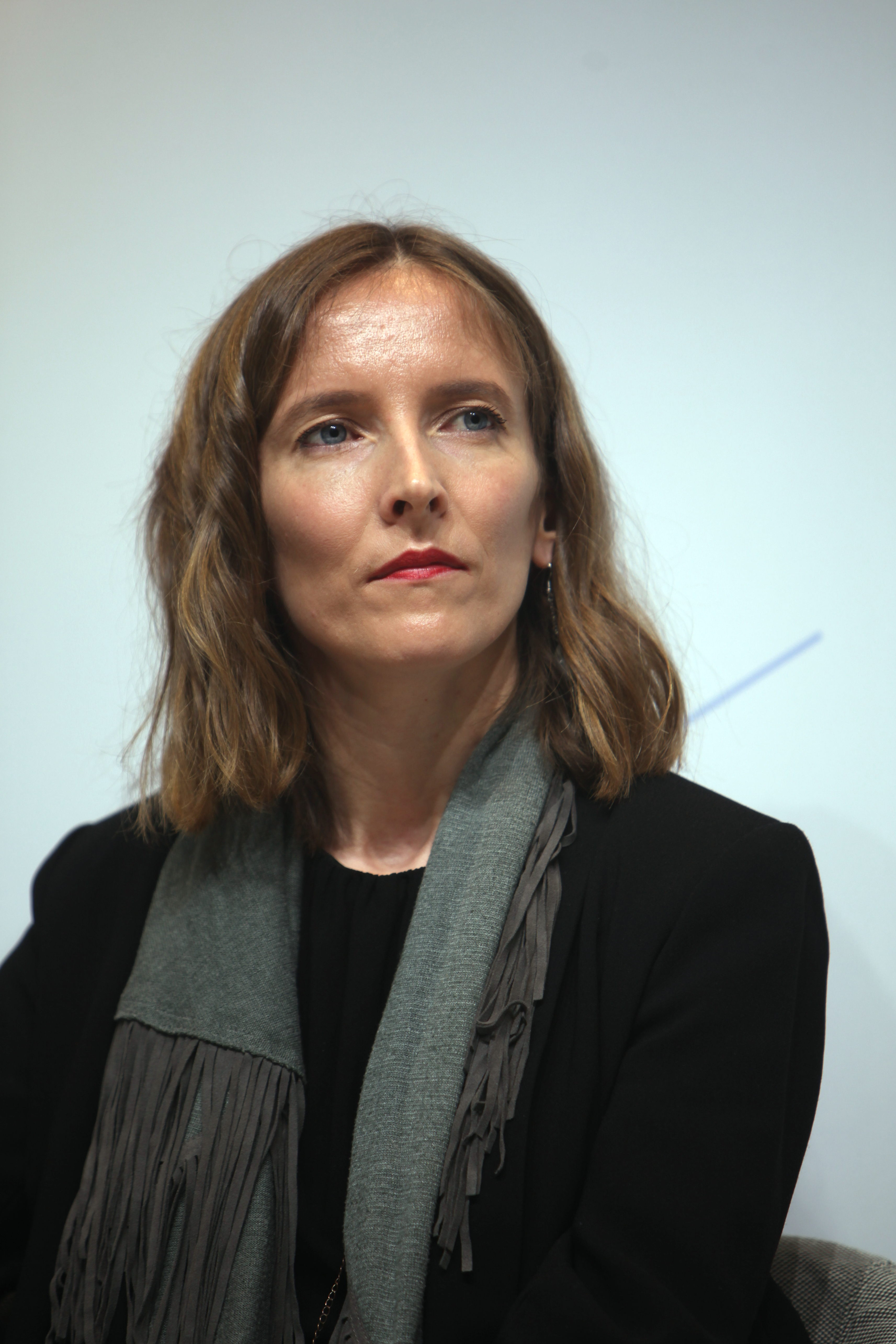
- Born: 23 December 1980 (age 45)

Academic background
- Education: université catholique de Louvain
- Thesis: La justice des mineurs en temps de guerre. La pratique du tribunal pour enfants de Namur durant les années 1940

Marie Peltier (born 23 December 1980) is a Belgian author. She teaches at the Institut supérieur de pédagogie Galilée in Brussels.

== Biography ==
Marie Peltier teaches at ISPG in Brussels, a training institution training primary and middle school teachers, situated in Schaerbeek. She teaches history to first year bachelors.

Her Master's degree thesis, La justice des mineurs en temps de guerre. La pratique du tribunal pour enfants de Namur durant les années 1940, defended at université catholique de Louvain in 2003, regarded justice for minors during the 1940s.

Since 2011, Peltier has worked as a project leader at Be-Pax, the French-speaking section of Pax Christi, on intercultural issues, organising discussion groups — notably on the Syrian Civil War and on the Middle East— and had published articles on the internal journal of the association. As a specialist of Syria, she had moved to studying conspiracy theories and their effect on Syrian issues.

Marie Peltier has worked with Paolo Dall'Oglio on promoting Human Rights and democracy in Syria. She also works on Human Rights in Europe and issues such as antisemitism, humanism in politics, the migration crisis, the lack of trust in media, the Far-Right, and propaganda of dictatorships).

Peltier has written two books on conspiracy theories: L'ère du complotisme : La maladie d’une société fracturée in 2016, and Obsession, dans les coulisses du récit complotiste in 2018.

She has published various contributions in medias such as l'Obs, l'Express and Le Monde, and has appeared on the TV show 28 minutes.

== Study of conspiracy theories ==
Peltier argues that since the September 11 attacks, conspiracy theories have taken hold in collective fantasy and are becoming prominent in Western societies. « Conspiracy theories, with their very problematic ideology, hijack legitimate questions into something perverted and damaging, but the intention is sound ». She has attempted to deconstruct the workings of the phenomenon.

== Bibliography ==
Books

- L'amour dans la vérité, caritas in veritate - guide de lecture pour la lettre encyclique, en collaboration avec Jean-Marie Faux et Guy Cossée de Maulde, éditions Fidélité, 2009
- L'ère du complotisme, La maladie d'une société fracturée, éditions Les Petits Matins, 2016
- Obsession, Dans les coulisses du récit complotiste, éditions Inculte, 2018

=== Book chapters ===
- Notre monde est-il plus dangereux ? 25 questions pour vous faire votre opinion, Armand Colin published, edited by Sonia Le Gouriellec, 2017
