= Marie Marville =

French lyric artist (1873–1961)

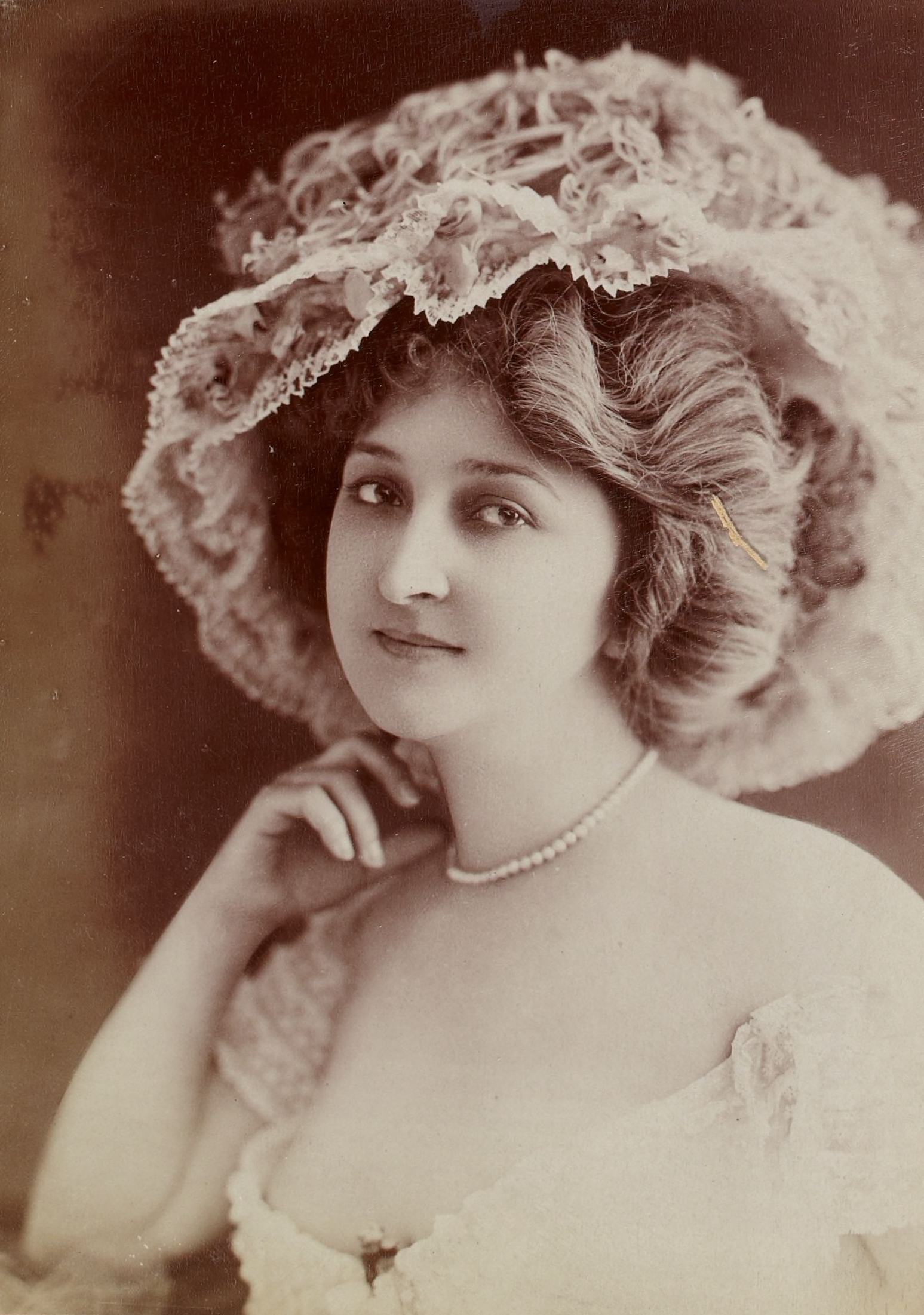
Marie Marville

Marie Victoria Mayer (21 July 1873 – 5 May 1961), known professionally as Marie Marville, was a French lyric artist, singer and actress.

== Life ==
Born in Combleux, Marie Victoria Mayer was the daughter of Victor Mayer, a prisoner in Nevers in 1873, and Léonie Josephine Chereau.

Around 1895, she began performing at the Molier Circus. She performed at the Theater des Vieux. She performed at the Folies-Bergère. She performed at Moulin Rouge.

Marville died in Eaubonne on 5 May 1961, aged 87.
