= Marie Christensen =

Marie Christensen may refer to:

- Karen Marie Christensen (1871–1945), Danish trade unionist
- Kirsten Marie Christensen (1860–1935), Danish politician
- Marie Christensen, Danish matron of Myora Mission in the colony of Queensland in 1896, responsible for the murder of a child
