= Marie Joséphine Goetz =

French nun

Marie Joséphine Goetz (7 March 1817 – 4 January 1874) was a French nun, the second superior-general of the Society of the Sacred Heart.

== Life ==
From Alsace-Lorraine, Marie Joséphine was the daughter of Joseph Goetz of Strasbourg and Marie Anne Wagner. As her parents died when Goetz was still young, her education was left to the care of an aunt. The aunt sent her to school at the Convent of the Sacred Heart, Besançon. At the age of seventeen she entered the novitiate of the Sacred Heart at Montet and took her first religious vows in 1837.

In 1842 she was entrusted with the charge of the school at Besançon, which was going through a difficult phase, and showed judicious management. Immediately after profession in 1847 she was appointed mistress of novices at Conflans, Charenton-le-Pont. Goetz continued in this charge, to which was afterwards added the government of the house as superior, until 1864, when she was named vicar-general.

The failing strength of Superior-general Sophie Barat, who founded the Society, made it necessary for her to have someone at hand, to whom she could communicate her views for the future. She found a full understanding of them in Josephine Goetz, who was elected superior-general in 1865.

Goetz governed as superior-general for nine years. Her work was principally one of consolidation. She established a training school at Conflans to prepare the young religious for their duties as teachers, and entrusted to a small committee the revision and adaptation of the curriculum of studies to the growing needs of the order. During the Franco-Prussian War and the time of the siege and Commune in Paris, Goetz was obliged to withdraw to Laval, that communications with her religious might not be cut off.

She made visitations to the religious houses then existing in Europe, as far as time and health permitted - but her strength rapidly failed and she died from a stroke of paralysis, after a few days' illness.
