= Marie Wallin =

British fibre artist

- Occupations: fibre artist, fashion designer
- Known for: Fair Isle designs

Marie Wallin is a British fibre artist and fashion designer known for her colourful fair isle designs. After working as a head designer for Rowan (yarn company) for many years, she became a freelance knitwear designer.

== Education ==
Wallin got a first class degree in textiles at Leicester Polytechnic, now DeMontfort University in 1986. Her final collection was inspired by artist Piet Mondrian.

== Career ==
After finishing her education, Wallin worked for a small knitwear company in Nottingham. A year later she started her own business selling machine knitted designs internationally.

From the mid-1990s she started working in the commercial knitwear industry again, before joining yarn company Rowan as Head Designer. In this position she was responsible for designing handknits, but also photoshoots and the general creative direction. She became known for her colourful fair isle designs during this time.

In 2013, Wallin started her own business as a freelance knitwear designer. She has since published many books and released her own yarn British Breeds, spun by John Arbon Textiles. All of the designs in her books are modelled by actress/model Georgia Scarlet Waters. Wallin says that she "doesn't really stop working" and knits something work-related every night.

In 2014, a fair isle throw designed by Wallin was featured in the exhibition Wool Collection: Interiors for the fifth annual UK Wool Week.

Wallin's designs have been praised by designer Kate Davies and she was interviewed three times by the podcast Fruity Knitting. According to the knitting pattern database Ravelry, her patterns have been published in at least 290 different magazine issues, including Simply Knit, Simply Crochet, Rowan Magazine, Suuri Käsityö, Stitches and The Knitter.

== Personal life ==
Wallin grew up in an artistic family and was taught to draw and paint by her father as a child.

== Published works ==
- Wallin, Marie (2013). Windswept: Collection One, Marie Wallin Designs. ISBN 978-0992797805
- Wallin, Marie (2014). Lakeland: Collection Two, Marie Wallin Designs. ISBN 978-0992797812
- Wallin, Marie (2015). Filigree: Collection Three, Marie Wallin Designs. ISBN 9780992797829
- Wallin, Marie (2015). Once Upon a Time: Collection Four, Marie Wallin Designs. ISBN 978-0992797836
- Wallin, Marie (2015). Autumn: Collection Five, Marie Wallin Designs. ISBN 978-0992797843
- Wallin, Marie (2016). Spring Time: Collection Six, Marie Wallin Designs. ISBN 9780992797850
- Wallin, Marie (2016). Winter Crochet: Collection Seven, Marie Wallin Designs. ISBN 9780992797867
- Wallin, Marie (2017). North Sea: Collection Eight, Marie Wallin Designs. ISBN 9780992797874
- Wallin, Marie (2017). Shetland, Marie Wallin Designs. ISBN 9780992797881
- Wallin, Marie (2018). Bloomsbury: Collection Nine, Marie Wallin Designs. ISBN 9780992797898
- Wallin, Marie (2018). Wildwood, Marie Wallin Designs. ISBN 9781916400801
- Wallin, Marie (2019). Meadow, Marie Wallin Designs. ISBN 9781916400825
- Wallin, Marie (2019). Gentle, Marie Wallin Designs. ISBN 978-1916400832
