= Marie Chisholm-Burns =

American academic

- Born: Marie Chisholm

Marie A. Chisholm-Burns (née Chisholm) is an educator, university administrator and pharmacist. As of 2022, she is the Executive Vice President and Provost of Oregon Health & Science University (OHSU). She is also the J.S. Reinschmidt Endowed Professor in the OHSU School of Medicine Department of Surgery.

== Early life and education ==
Chisholm-Burns grew up in Hempstead, New York where she was an only child. She became interested in the sciences while in high school. She earned her bachelor's degree from Georgia College, and then moved to the University of Georgia where she received a Doctor of Pharmacy degree. She has a Master of Public Health degree from Emory University; a Master of Business Administration degree from the University of Memphis, and she earned her Ph.D. from the University of South Dakota in 2021.

== Career ==
Chisholm-Burns was a faculty member of the University of Georgia College of Pharmacy for 13 years. In 2007 she was named head of the College of Pharmacy at the University of Arizona College of Pharmacy. In 2012, she became Dean of the University of Tennessee Health Science Center (UTHSC) College of Pharmacy. In 2020 she earned the title of Distinguished Professor in the UTHSC Colleges of Pharmacy and Medicine. In July 2022, Chisholm-Burns became Executive Vice President and Provost of Oregon Health & Science University.

== Work ==
Chisholm-Burns is known for her work on transplant medicine where she has worked to gather medications for patients receiving organ donations. She is also interested in education research, and application of business principals to decisions made by pharmacists.

== Selected publications ==
- Chisholm-Burns, Marie A.; Graff Zivin, Joshua S.; Lee, Jeannie Kim; Spivey, Christina A.; Slack, Marion; Herrier, Richard N.; Hall-Lipsy, Elizabeth; Abraham, Ivo; Palmer, John (2010-10-01). "Economic effects of pharmacists on health outcomes in the United States: A systematic review". American Journal of Health-System Pharmacy. 67 (19): 1624–1634. doi:10.2146/ajhp100077. ISSN 1079-2082.
- Chisholm-Burns, Marie A.; Vaillancourt, Allison M.; Shepherd, Marv (2014). Pharmacy Management, Leadership, Marketing, and Finance. Burlington, MA: Jones & Bartlett Publishers. ISBN 978-1-4496-6028-4.
- Chisholm-Burns, Marie A.; Kim Lee, Jeannie; Spivey, Christina A.; Slack, Marion; Herrier, Richard N.; Hall-Lipsy, Elizabeth; Graff Zivin, Joshua; Abraham, Ivo; Palmer, John; Martin, Jennifer R.; Kramer, Sandra S.; Wunz, Timothy (2010). "US Pharmacists' Effect as Team Members on Patient Care: Systematic Review and Meta-Analyses". Medical Care. 48 (10): 923–933. doi:10.1097/MLR.0b013e3181e57962. ISSN 0025-7079.
- Chisholm-Burns, Marie A.; Spivey, Christina A.; Hagemann, Tracy; Josephson, Michelle A. (2017-03-01). "Women in leadership and the bewildering glass ceiling". American Journal of Health-System Pharmacy. 74 (5): 312–324. doi:10.2146/ajhp160930. ISSN 1079-2082.
- Chisholm-Burns, Marie A.; Schwinghammer, Terry L.; Malone, Patrick M.; Kolesar, Jill M.; Lee, Kelly C; Bookstaver, P. Brandon (2022-02-18). Pharmacotherapy Principles and Practice, Sixth Edition. McGraw-Hill Education / Medical. ISBN 978-1-260-46027-8.

== Awards and honors ==
She received the Robert K. Chalmers Distinguished Pharmacy Educator Award from the American College of Clinical Pharmacy in 2005. In 2014, the American Pharmacists Association awarded Chisholm-Burns with their research achievement award. In 2020 the American College of Clinical Pharmacy again honored her, this time with the Russell R. Miller Award. In 2021, the American Association of Colleges of Pharmacy awarded Chisholm with a Distinguished Teaching Scholar Award. In 2022 she received the Distinguished Leadership Award from the American Society of Health-System Pharmacists.
