= Marie Hackman =

Finnish businessperson

Marie Elisabet Hackman née Laube (7 January 1776, Viborg - 2 September 1865), was a Finnish businessperson. She was the managing director of the biggest wood export company in Finland, Hackman & Co in Viborg, from 1807 to 1829. During the 1810s, her company stood for about half of the wood export from Finland.

Marie Hackman, who was of German descent, was the daughter of Helena Havemanin and merchant Johan Friedrich Laube, married merchant Johan Friedrich Hackman, with whom she had the son Johan Fredrik Hackman the Younger. In 1807, she was widowed and took over the management of her late husbands company, as well as that of her father when he died later that same year, and managed both companies until her son became an adult in 1829.
