= Marie Kubiak =

French footballer (born 1981)

Personal information
- Date of birth: 11 May 1981 (age 45)
- Place of birth: Valenciennes
- Position: Forward

Senior career*
Years	Team	Apps	(Gls)
- Olympique Lyonnais

International career
1998–2002	France	6	
- * Club domestic league appearances and goals

Marie Kubiak (born 11 May 1981) is a French women's international footballer who plays as a forward. She is a member of the France women's national football team. She was part of the team at the UEFA Women's Euro 2001. On club level she plays for Olympique Lyonnais in France.
