= Marie Gil =

French writer and academic

Marie Gil is a French writer and Professor of French Literature in Paris.

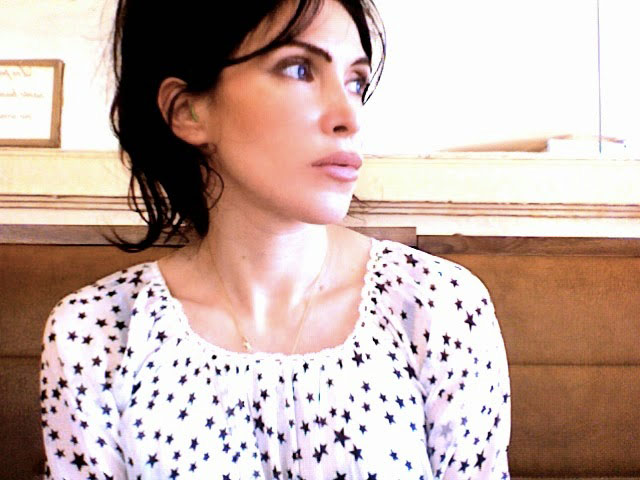
Marie Gil

She studied at HEC Paris, Ecole Normale Supérieure and Paris-Sorbonne University, was a Fellow of the Fondation Thiers and taught French Literature at Paris-Sorbonne University and at the University of Franche-Comté, and is currently vice-president of the Collège international de philosophie. She is also director of the Roland Barthes research group at the Ecole Normale Supérieure.

She is the author of various books and articles on the theory of literature and the theory of reading, especially on the question of Literalism and Immanence, and she was noticed for her biography of Roland Barthes, in which she reads his life "as a text". She is a contributing editor to the French newspapers Le Monde, and Le Nouvel Observateur and used to do a weekly broadcast on France Musique.

She is also a member of the Prix de littérature André Gide and has published fiction.

== Publications ==
- Les Deux Ecritures (Cerf, 2010).
- Péguy au pied de la lettre (Cerf, 2011).
- Roland Barthes, au lieu de la vie (Flammarion, 2012).
- Est (MF, 2015).
- La Chambre d'à côté (Hermann, 2017).
- L'Axe de Cendre (MF, 2018)

***

- Roland Barthes: en sortant du cinéma (Textuel, 2018)
- Vita Nova (Hermann, 2016).
- Formalisme et littérature (Les Temps modernes, 2013).
- La critique de droite (Revue d'Histoire littéraire de la France, 2012).
