= Marie S. Wilcox =

American mathematics teacher

Marie S. Wilcox (died September 29, 1995) was an American high school mathematics teacher and textbook author who served as president of the National Council of Teachers of Mathematics.

== Education and career ==
Wilcox was a graduate of Indiana University Bloomington, and taught mathematics at George Washington Community High School and Thomas Carr Howe Community High School in Indianapolis from 1927 until retiring in 1969. She served as president of the National Council of Teachers of Mathematics from 1954 to 1956.

After retiring, she moved to Florida, where she died on September 29, 1995.

== Books ==
Wilcox was the author or coauthor of textbooks in mathematics including:

- Algebra, First Course (with John R. Mayor, Prentice-Hall, 1956)
- Algebra, Second Course (with John R. Mayor, Prentice-Hall, 1957)
- Mathematics, a Modern Approach (with John E. Yarnelle, Addison-Wesley, 1963)
- Basic Modern Mathematics (with John E. Yarnelle, Addison-Wesley, 1964)
- Contemporary Algebra, First Course (with John R. Mayor, Prentice-Hall, 1965)
- Contemporary Algebra, Second Course (with John R. Mayor, Prentice-Hall, 1965)
- Mathematics, a Modern Approach, Second Course (Addison-Wesley, 1966)
- Basic Algebra (Addison-Wesley, 1977)

== Recognition ==
Wilcox was named a Fellow of the American Association for the Advancement of Science in 1956. An award for female mathematics students at Indiana University, the Marie S. Wilcox Scholarship, is named for Wilcox.
