= Marie Magdelaine Mouron =

French soldier

- Other names: Picard, Saint-Michel, La Garenne
- Occupation(s): Soldier, dragoon

Marie Magdelaine Mouron, also known as Picard, Saint-Michel and La Garenne (floruit 1696), was a French soldier.

== Biography ==
Marie Magdelaine Mouron grew up near Boulogne-sur-Mer, as the daughter of a butcher who became a mercenary. Following her father's remarriage, Mouron left her family in 1690, and served in the French army disguised as a male from 1690 until 1696.

She served in the Royal-Wallon regiment under the name Picard, but was forced to leave in Sisteron. Under the pseudonym Saint-Michel, she served under the Duke of Noailles in Catalonia and participated in the Siege of Rosas in 1693 during the Nine Years' War disguised as a man. Her biological sex was exposed after she was forced to seek medical attention due to an injury sustained from a duel with a male comrade. When the Duke of Noailles learned of this, he placed her under the protection of the wife of an artillery officer and later sent her to Perpignan to be educated.

In March 1696, she joined the Biez infantry regiment under the name La Garenne. On May 1st, she deserted the regiment after having hidden her uniform. She was arrested while trying to enlist in another regiment and accused of desertion, during which her story was documented. The regular sentence for desertion was death, but Mouron received a prison sentence.

The documentation of her case is considered to have great historic value for several reasons: it documents a case of a female early modern age soldier without the sensationalism usually surrounding narratives of such occurrences; it also documents the life of a common foot soldier of the French army regardless of gender, as narratives of French foot soldiers of this epoch are quite rare.
