= Marie Wright =

Marie Wright may refer to:

- Marie Wright (actress) (1861–1949), British stage and film actress
- Marie Wright (curler) (born 1960), Canadian wheelchair curler
- Marie Robinson Wright (1853–1914), American travel writer
