= Marie Shear =

American feminist writer (1940–2017)

- Marie Shear as a college student, from a 1963 newspaper.
- Born: Marie Shear Meiselman; 1940
- Died: 2017 (aged 76–77)
- Other name: Marie Meiselman Shear
- Education: Brooklyn College
- Occupations: Writer, feminist activist

Marie Meiselman Shear (1940 – December 2017), also known as Marie Shear Meiselman, was an American writer and feminist activist, known for her definition of feminism as "The radical notion that women are people."

== Early life ==
Marie Shear Meiselman majored in English at Brooklyn College, and graduated in 1964.

== Career ==
Shear described herself as a "widely unheralded writer & editor". She was an active member of the National Writers Union and the Brooklyn chapter of the National Organization for Women. For eight years, Shear wrote a satirical column in New Directions for Women entitled "Shear Chauvinism". She also wrote opinion and advice essays for Ms. Magazine and the San Francisco Examiner, and contributed to The Women's Review of Books.

Shear coined the phrase "Feminism is the radical notion that women are people" in her review of A Feminist Dictionary in New Directions for Women in 1986. It appears as one of over thirty additional definitions created by Shear as a 'toast' to the compilers of the dictionary, which has led to its misattribution to those compilers (Cheris Kramarae, Paula A. Treichler, and Ann Russo).

== Personal life ==
Shear died in late December 2017, in her seventies.
