= Marie Marguerite Bouvet =

American author

Marie Marguerite Bouvet (14 February 1865 – 27 May 1915) was a writer of children's books.

Born in New Orleans to French parents, she lived most of her childhood with her paternal grandparents in Lyon, France. She went to Loquet-Leroy Female Institute in New Orleans for school. She graduated in 1885 from St. Mary's College in Knoxville Illinois. Her first book was published in 1890, titled Sweet William.

She died in Reading, Pennsylvania, where she was living.

== Principle works ==
- Sweet William (1890)
- Little (1885)
- Prince Tip-Top (1892)
- My Lady (1894)
- A Child of Tuscany (1895)
- Pierrette (1896)
- A Little House in Pimlico (1897)
- Tales of an Old Château (1899)
- Fluers de Poétes et des Prosateurs Français (1900)
- Bernardo and Laurette (1901)
- The Smile of the Sphinx (1911)
