= Marie Eggeling =

German bridge player

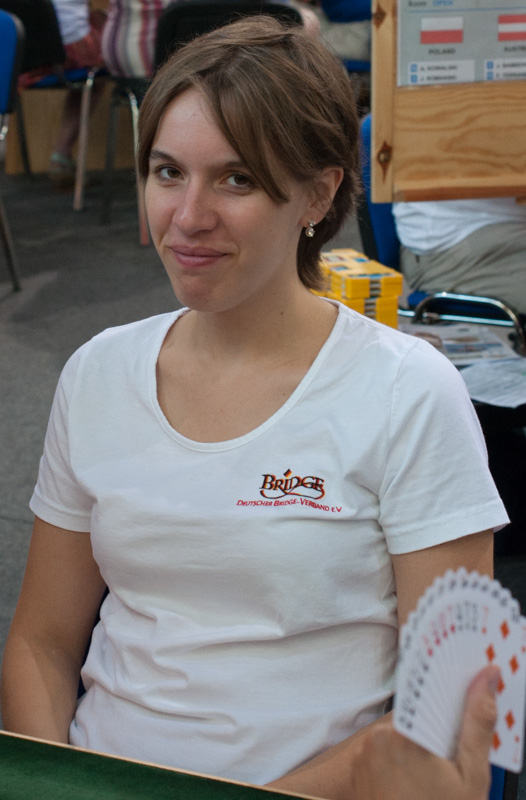
Eggeling in 2014

Marie Eggeling is a German silver-medallist World Champion bridge player. She came second in the Women's Pair event in Wrocław in 2022.

== Bridge accomplishments ==
=== Wins ===
- World Bridge Series Women Pairs (1) 2022
