= Marie Lhuissier =

French mathematical story-teller

Marie Lhuissier (born 1989) is a French mathematician, mathematical story-teller, and children's book author.

== Education and work ==
Lhuissier earned a Ph.D. at the École normale supérieure de Lyon in 2018, with the dissertation Le problème mathématique des trois corps, abordé simultanément sous l'angle de la recherche théorique et celui de la diffusion auprès de publics variés concerning both the theory and public dissemination of research on the three-body problem in celestial mechanics, jointly directed by Étienne Ghys and Christian Mercat.

After completing her doctorate, she decided to devote herself to popularizing mathematics through telling stories to children. Her philosophy is that by identifying with the subjects of her stories, who are forced to use mathematics creatively to solve their problems, children can come to learn of mathematics as a dynamic and creative subject, rather than one that is static and abstract.

== Books ==
Lhuissier has published some of her stories in book form, including:

- Lune (illustrated by Elis Tamula, 2017)
- La Faiseuse de Neige (illustrated by Elis Tamula, 2018)

== Recognition ==
The Société mathématique de France gave Lhuissier the 2022 d'Alembert Prize for the dissemination of mathematics.
