= Marie Papaix =

French association football player (born 1989)

Personal information
- Date of birth: 10 June 1989 (age 37)
- Place of birth: Toulouse, France
- Height: 1.64 m (5 ft 5 in)
- Position: Defender

Team information
- Current team: Toulouse

Marie Papaix (born 10 June 1989) is a French footballer who plays for Toulouse.
