= Marie Mendras =

Russian political scientist

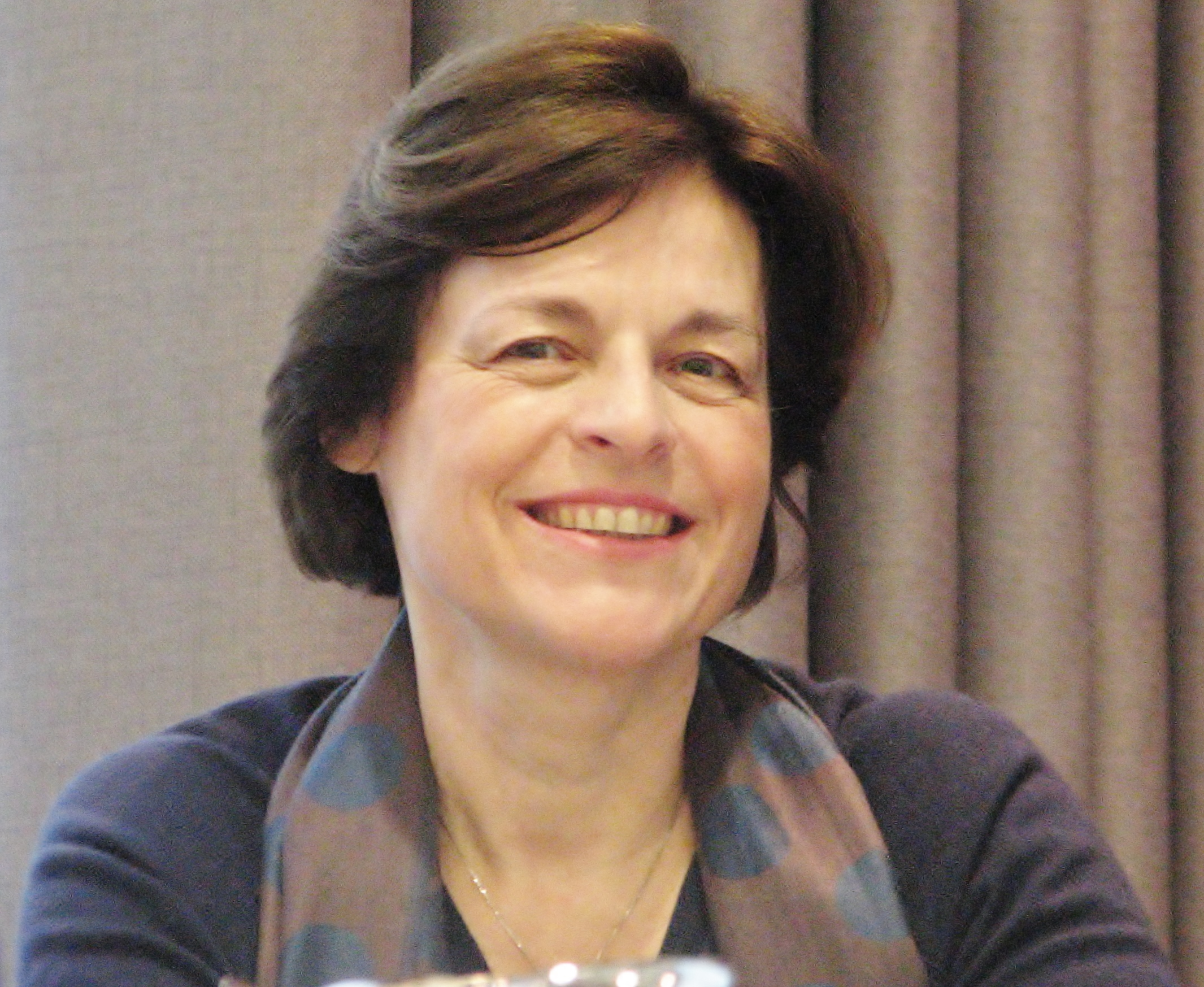
Marie Mendras in Tallinn Photo: Ave Maria Mõistlik, 26 April 2015

Marie Mendras (born in 1957) is a political scientist in the field of Russian and post-Soviet studies. She is a research fellow with the Centre national de la recherche scientifique (CNRS) and a professor at Sciences Po University's School of International Affairs in Paris.

She is on the editorial board of journals Esprit (Paris) and Pro et Contra (Moscow) and is a member of the EU-Russia Centre in Brussels.

Mendras is Associate Fellow with the Russia and Eurasia Programme at Chatham House, London.

At the Centre d'études et de recherches internationales, Mendras conducts research on the Russian political system, elite behaviour and society, and Russian policies toward Europe. She runs the Observatoire de la Russie which organizes a seminar series.

From 2008 to 2010, she was a professor in the Government Department of the London School of Economics and Political Science. In earlier years, she taught at Université Paris 1-Sorbonne, Université Paris 10-Nanterre, Université de Louvain/Leuven, Ecole des Mines in Paris, and MGIMO in Moscow.

In 2010, Mendras was Director of the Policy Planning Staff, French Ministry of Foreign Affairs. From 1983 to 1991, she worked as a part-time consultant for the Policy Planning Staff. From 1992 to 1998, she consulted for the Directoral for Strategic Affairs, Ministry of Defence.

Mendras was educated at the University of Essex, Sciences Po University and Institut des Langues et Civilisations Orientales in Paris, SAIS-Johns Hopkins University, and Harvard University. She holds a doctorate in political science from Sciences Po, Paris.

== Publications ==
A selective list of recent publications :

Books

- Russian Politics. The Paradox of a Weak State, Hurst, London, and Columbia University Press, New-York, 2012. ISBN 0231703902
- Russie. L'envers du pouvoir, Paris, Odile Jacob, 2008, 333 p.
- Comment fonctionne la Russie ? Le politique, le bureaucrate et l'oligarque, ed., Paris, CERI/Autrement, 2003, 124 p.
- Un Etat pour la Russie, ed., Bruxelles Complexe, Coll. Espace international,1992, 145 p.

Editor of Special Issues of Journals

« La Russie de Poutine », dir., Pouvoirs, N. 112, 2005, 152 p.

« Social Change in Russia », La revue Tocqueville/The Tocqueville Review, vol. XXIII, N. 2, 2002, p. 7-79.

« Qui gouverne en Russie ? », dossier de six articles, La Revue Tocqueville/The Tocqueville Review, Vol. XIX, n° 1, 1998, p. 3-135.

« How Regional Elites Preserve Their Power », Post-Soviet Affairs, Vol. 15, n°4, octobre-décembre 1999, p. 295-311.

« Regions of Russia : a Special Issue of Post-Soviet Affairs », Post-Soviet Affairs (UCLA, Berkeley), October–December 1999, p. 291-406.

Book chapters and articles

"Russia and the Quest for Lost Power", in Jacques Rupnik, ed., 1989 as a Political World Event, Routledge, London, 2013.

"Russia-France. A Strained Political Relationship", Russian Analytical Digest, 130, 1 July 2013.

Putin's empire, Batory Foundation, Varsovie, 2007, p. 145-160 (version polonaise, et version anglaise)

"Citizens in danger. Human Rights and civil liberties in Putin's Russia », Studies of the European Parliament, PE.385.539, novembre 2007, 30 pages (in English, French and Russian).

« Anna ou la dénonciation de la violence », in Hommage à Anna Politkovskaïa, Buchet/Chastel, 2007, p. 165-178.

"Russia's Institutional Regression and Its Consequences on Foreign Policy", EU-Russia Centre Review, 2/2006

« Rossia i Ukraina na raspute demokratii » (La Russie et l'Ukraine au carrefour de la démocratie), Sravnitelnoe konstitusionnoe obozrenie, (Revue constitutionnelle comparative) N. 1 (50) 2005, p. 35-37.

"Villages Poutinekine ou les écueils d'un régime autoritaire", Esprit, N. 319, novembre 2005, p. 22-31

"Vladimir Poutine, tsar pétrolier", Alternatives internationales, Hors série 3, décembre 2005, p. 24-25

« Russia and Europe. The Challenge of Proximity », in Andreas Kellerhals, dir, The challenge of Proximity, Schulthess Juristische Medien AG, Zürich, 2004, p. 51-60.
