= Marie Guerlain =

French artist, designer, nutrition health coach

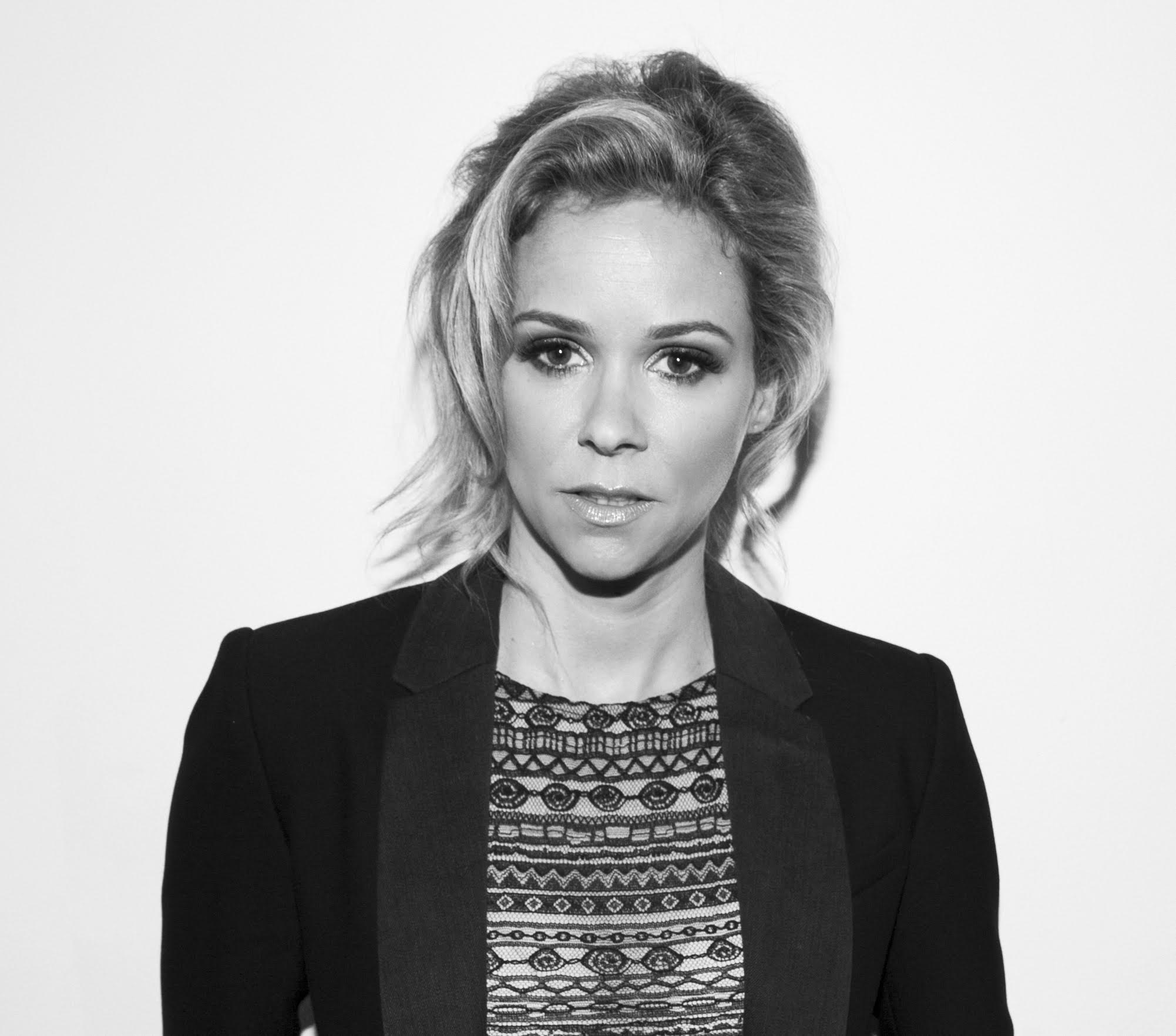
- Born: Marie Ondine Guerlain; 9 September 1975 (age 50); Paris, France

Marie Ondine Guerlain (born 9 September 1975) is a French artist, designer, nutrition health coach and proprietor of Ondine Cuisine. She is a sixth-generation member of the Guerlain perfume and cosmetics dynasty.

== Family ==
Marie Guerlain was born on 9 September 1975, in Paris, France. Her parents are both of French ancestry. Guerlain is a sixth-generation member of the Guerlain family and granddaughter of Raymond Guerlain who designed the perfume bottle for Shalimar. She has one sister. Her family relocated to the UK in 1977. Throughout her career she has lived in Switzerland, France, US and Asia.

=== Education ===
Guerlain was educated at Lycée Français Charles de Gaulle, Collège Alpin International Beau Soleil and Woldingham School, Surrey. Guerlain studied art foundation course at Chelsea Art College and then undertook 3D design and architecture at Kingston University before studying Fine Art and Design at the Parsons School of Design, New York. Guerlain later went on to qualify in 2016 as a nutrition health coach at the Institute of Integrative Nutrition, New York, NY.

=== Philanthropy ===
In 2009 Guerlain acted as an ambassador for Starlight, a charity for seriously and terminally ill children. She was Executive Director and Chairman of Innocence in Danger UK (2010-2012) an international child welfare organisation established in 1999 as part of an UNESCO initiative. She was patron of the Marie Collins Foundation that enables children who suffer sexual abuse and exploitation via Internet and mobile technologies to recover. In 2013 she was Executive Director of the NSPCC’s annual Art Ball.
