= Marie Roumy =

Cameroonian nun

- Born: January 14, 1924; La Charité-sur-Loire, France
- Died: February 23, 2013 (aged 89); Douala, Cameroon
- Occupation: Religious sister

Marie Roumy (born January 14, 1924, in La Charité-sur-Loire, France; died February 23, 2013, in Douala, Cameroon) was a French and later Cameroonian religious sister.

Originally a teacher, she settled in the poor neighborhoods of Douala, where she improved sanitation, established schools, hospitals, a savings cooperative, provided jobs for young people, founded the Chain of Saint-Nicodème Homes for street children, training centers, and shelters for prostitutes.

== Biography ==
Marie Roumy was born on January 14, 1924, in the hamlet of Sainte-Hélène near La Charité-sur-Loire, in the department of Nièvre.

After becoming a religious sister, she moved to Cameroon and began teaching at a missionary school in Douala, the capital, in 1949. She later became the director of this school but eventually handed over her responsibilities to the local Cameroonian population and began teaching in the poor neighborhoods.

With the permission of her religious order, Marie Roumy settled in Nkongmondo, a poor neighborhood of Douala. She provided education to the women of this neighborhood for three years. In 1975, she paused her teaching to return to France for training in popular education.

Returning to Douala in 1978, she settled in the Nylon neighborhood, another poor area of the capital. She organized the sanitation of the roads, their drainage to prevent flooding, and their improvement, initially through artisanal means and later with government support. She secured external aid, particularly from the World Bank and the Swiss government, to finance infrastructure, schools, and hospitals in the neighborhood.

She also organized a savings cooperative, the Caisse Populaire de Nylon (CPN), and helped employ many young unemployed people.

Marie Roumy was very involved with street children. In 1986, she obtained Cameroonian nationality and, in 1995, founded the Chain of Saint-Nicodème Homes for street children with Jean-Duc Keutcha, himself a former street child. She also organized training centers for them in crafts.

Marie Roumy created centers for welcoming, listening to, and sheltering prostituted girls.

In early 2013, Marie Roumy was injured while trying to protect a young person during a brawl, and she later fell ill. She died a few weeks later, on February 23, 2013, in a clinic in Douala. She was buried on February 27, 2013.

== Bibliography ==
- Odile Foch (1999). Soeur Marie Roumy. Éditions du Signe. ISBN 9782877187466.

== See also ==
=== Related articles ===
- Chain of Saint-Nicodème Homes
- Street children
