= Marie Fuema =

Senegalese-Congolese model (born 1987)

Marie Fuema (born September 6, 1987) is a Senegalese-Congolese model. She lives in New York City, and is a model of IMG New York. Recently, she featured in the Oscar de la Renta 2009 pre-Fall fashion show.
