= Marie Ramírez =

Costa Rican ten-pin bowler

Marie Ramírez is a Costa Rican ten-pin bowler. She finished in 12th position of the combined rankings at the 2006 AMF World Cup.

== Personal life ==
Ramírez is married to Adolfo Estrada del Llano.
