= NAACP Image Award for Outstanding Literary Work – Poetry =

American literature award

This article lists the winners and nominees for the NAACP Image Award for Outstanding Literary Work – Poetry. This award was first awarded in 2007 and since its conception, Nikki Giovanni holds the record for most wins in this category with three.

== Winners and nominees ==
=== 2000s ===
Award winners and finalists, 2007–2009
Year	Book	Author	Result	Ref.
2007	Celebrations, Rituals of Peace and Prayer	Maya Angelou	Winner	
2007	Check the Rhyme: An Anthology of Female Poets & Emcees	DuEwa Frazier	Finalist	
2007	Hoops	Major Jackson	Finalist	
2007	Jazz	Walter Dean Myers	Finalist	
2007	We Speak Your Names	Pearl Cleage	Finalist	
2008	Acolytes: Poems	Nikki Giovanni	Winner	
2008	Duende: Poems	Tracy K. Smith	Finalist	
2008	Eloquence: Rhythm and Renaissance	Usi Ku	Finalist	
2008	Quiver of Arrows	Carl Phillips	Finalist	
2008	Selected Poems	Derek Walcott	Finalist	
2009	—N/a			

=== 2010s ===
Award winners and finalists, 2010–2019
Year	Book	Author	Result	Ref.
2010	Bicycles	Nikki Giovanni	Winner	
2010	Black Nature: Four Centuries of African American Nature Poetry	Camille Dungy	Finalist	
2010	Cooling Board: A Long-Playing Poem	Mitchell L. H. Douglas	Finalist	
2010	Mixology	Adrian Matejka	Finalist	
2010	Roses and Revolutions: The Selected Writings of Dudley Randall	Melba Joyce Boyd	Finalist	
2011	100 Best African-American Poems	Nikki Giovanni	Winner	
2011	Hard Times Require Furious Dancing	Alice Walker	Finalist	
2011	Holding Company	Major Jackson	Finalist	
2011	Suck on the Marrow	Camille T. Dungy	Finalist	
2011	White Egrets	Derek Walcott	Finalist	
2012	Afro Clouds & Nappy Rain: The Curtis Brown Poems	James Golden	Winner	
2012	Head Off & Split	Nikky Finney	Finalist	
2012	Honoring Genius: The Narrative of Craft, Art, Kindness and Justice	Haki Madhubuti	Finalist	
2012	Intimate Thoughts	Darrin Henson	Finalist	
2012	Last Seen	Jacqueline Jones Lamon	Finalist	
2013	Speak Water	Truth Thomas	Winner	
2013	Hurrah's Nest	Arisa White	Finalist	
2013	Maybe the Saddest Thing	Marcus Wicker	Finalist	
2013	The Ground	Rowan Ricardo Phillips	Finalist	
2013	Thrall	Natasha Trethewey	Finalist	
2014	Turn Me Loose: The Unghosting of Medgar Evers	Frank X Walker	Winner	
2014	Chasing Utopia: A Hybrid	Nikki Giovanni	Finalist	
2014	Hum	Jamaal May	Finalist	
2014	The Cineaste: Poems	A. Van Jordan	Finalist	
2014	The Collected Poems of Ai	Ai	Finalist	
2015	Citizen: An American Lyric	Claudia Rankine	Winner	
2015	Digest	Gregory Pardlo	Finalist	
2015	The New Testament	Jericho Brown	Finalist	
2015	The Poetry of Derek Walcott 1948–2013	Derek Walcott	Finalist	
2015	We Didn't Know Any Gangsters	Brian Gilmore	Finalist	
2016	How to Be Drawn	Terrance Hayes	Winner	
2016	Catalog of Unabashed Gratitude	Ross Gay	Finalist	
2016	Reconnaissance	Carl Phillips	Finalist	
2016	Redbone	Mahogany L. Browne	Finalist	
2016	Wild Hundreds	Nate Marshall	Finalist	
2017	Collected Poems: 1974–2004	Rita Dove	Winner	
2017	Counting Descent	Clint Smith	Finalist	
2017	The Big Book of Exit Strategies	Jamaal May	Finalist	
2017	The Sobbing School	Joshua Bennett	Finalist	
2017	Thief in the Interior	Phillip B. Williams	Finalist	
2018	Incendiary Art: Poems	Patricia Smith	Winner	
2018	My Mother Was a Freedom Fighter	Aja Monet	Finalist	
2018	Silencer	Marcus Wicker	Finalist	
2018	The Drowning Boy's Guide to Water	Cameron Barnett	Finalist	
2018	Wild Beauty: New and Selected Poems	Ntozake Shange	Finalist	
2019	Taking the Arrow Out of the Heart	Alice Walker	Winner	
2019	Confessions of a Barefaced Woman	Allison Elaine Joseph	Finalist	
2019	Ghost, Like a Place	Iain Haley Pollock	Finalist	
2019	Refuse	Julian Randall	Finalist	
2019	The Gospel According to Wild Indigo	Cyrus Cassells	Finalist	

=== 2020s ===
Award winners and finalists, 2020–present
Year	Book	Author	Result	Ref.
2020	Felon: Poems	Reginald Dwayne Betts	Winner	
2020	A Bound Woman Is a Dangerous Thing: The Incarceration of African American Women from Harriet Tubman to Sandra Bland	DaMaris B. Hill	Finalist	
2020	Honeyfish	Lauren K. Alleyne	Finalist	
2020	Mistress	Chet'la Sebree	Finalist	
2020	The Tradition	Jericho Brown	Finalist	
2021	The Age of Phillis	Honorée Fanonne Jeffers	Winner	
2021	Homie	Danez Smith	Finalist	
2021	Kontemporary Amerikan Poetry	John Murillo	Finalist	
2021	Seeing the Body	Rachel Eliza Griffiths	Finalist	
2021	Un-American	Hafizah Geter	Finalist	
2022	Perfect Black	Crystal Wilkinson	Winner	
2022	Playlist for the Apocalypse	Rita Dove	Finalist	
2022	Such Color: New and Selected Poems	Tracy K. Smith	Finalist	
2022	The Wild Fox of Yemen	Threa Almontaser	Finalist	
2022	What Water Knows: Poems	Jacqueline Jones LaMon	Finalist	
2023	To the Realization of Perfect Helplessness	Robin Coste Lewis	Winner	
2023	Best Barbarian	Roger Reeves	Finalist	
2023	Bluest Nude	Ama Codjoe	Finalist	
2023	Concentrate	Courtney Faye Taylor	Finalist	
2023	Muse Found in a Colonized Body	Yesenia Montilla	Finalist	
2024	suddenly we	Evie Shockley	Winner	
2024	Above Ground	Clint Smith	Finalist	
2024	So to Speak	Terrance Hayes	Finalist	
2024	The Ferguson Report: An Erasure	Nicole Sealey	Finalist	
2024	Why Fathers Cry at Night	Kwame Alexander	Finalist	

== Multiple wins and nominations ==
=== Wins ===
3 wins

- Nikki Giovanni

=== Nominations ===
4 nominations

- Nikki Giovanni

3 nominations

- Derek Walcott

2 nominations

- Camille T. Dungy
- Major Jackson
- Jamaal May
- Carl Phillips
