= Northwestern University Press =

American publishing house

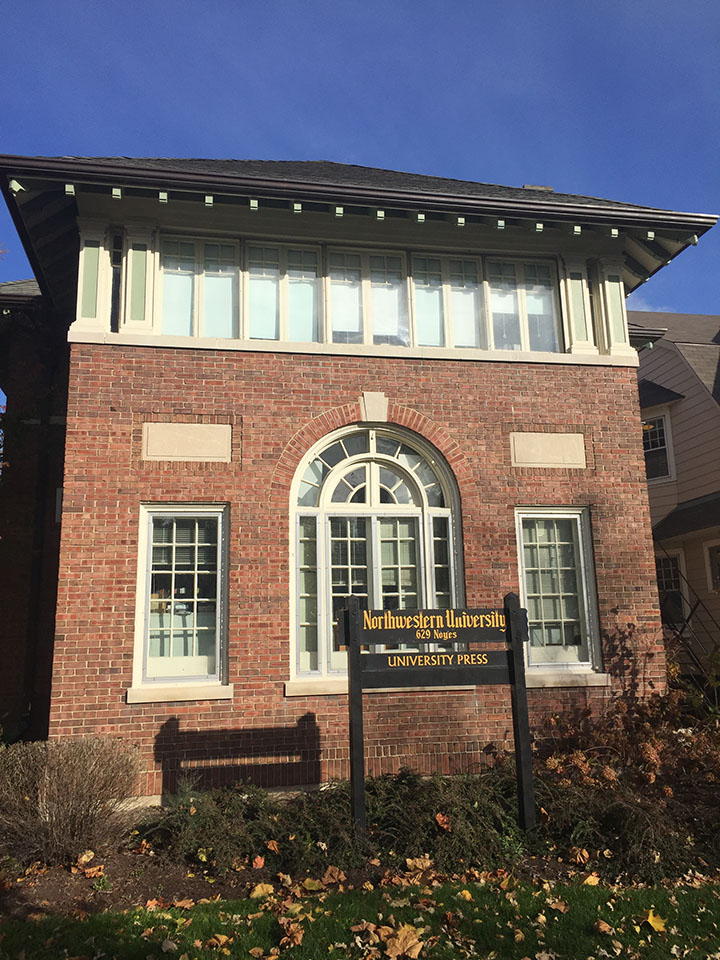
- Parent company: Northwestern University
- Founded: 1893
- Country of origin: United States
- Headquarters location: Evanston, Illinois
- Distribution: Chicago Distribution Center (US); Scholarly Book Services (Canada); Eurospan Group (Europe)
- Publication types: Books
- Official website: nupress.northwestern.edu

Northwestern University Press is an American publishing house affiliated with Northwestern University in Evanston, Illinois. It publishes 70 new titles each year in the areas of continental philosophy, poetry, Slavic and German literary criticism, Chicago regional studies, African American intellectual history, theater and performance studies, and fiction. Parneshia Jones is director of the press. It is a member of the Association of University Presses.

== History ==
Founded in 1893, Northwestern University Press was initially dedicated to the publication of legal periodicals and scholarly legal texts. In 1957, the Press was established as a separate university publishing company and began expanding its offerings with new series in various fields.

== Notable Publications, Imprints, and Series ==
Northwestern University Press publishes a wide range of titles. In 1963, the Press published Viola Spolin's landmark volume, Improvisation for the Theater: A Handbook of Teaching and Directing Techniques, which has sold more than 100,000 copies since its publication, and Northwestern's theater list includes works by Tony and Academy Award winners such as Mary Zimmerman, Tracy Letts, Bruce Norris, and Horton Foote, as well as playwrights David Ives, Craig Wright, and Ike Holter. In 2025, the Press began republishing the work of controversial writer Wendy C. Ortiz.

=== Studies in Phenomenology and Existential Philosophy (SPEP) ===
SPEP is a series of scholarly monographs and translations founded by James M. Edie and published by Northwestern University Press since the early 1960s, including works by Maurice Merleau-Ponty, Paul Ricoeur, and Edmund Husserl. The current series editor is Anthony Steinbock. The series was founded as a collaboration with the Society for Phenomenology and Existential Philosophy, and has been described as "one of the high watermarks in the society’s development."

=== TriQuarterly Books ===
In 1990, Northwestern University Press established a fiction and poetry imprint under the imprint name TriQuarterly, the name of an influential literary journal founded at the university in 1958 and operated by the press from 1964 to 2009. Writers such as Nikky Finney, Karla F.C. Holloway, Manuel Muñoz, Christine Schutt, A. E. Stallings, Patricia Smith, Bruce Weigl, and Angela Jackson have published titles in the imprint, including works that have won the National Book Award, Whiting Awards, the Kingsley Tufts Poetry Award, and the Hurston/Wright Legacy Award.

=== Melville ===
In the 1950s, the Modern Language Association (MLA) established the Center for Editions of American Authors (CEAA), which proposed to organize textual editing and publication projects for major American authors. Melville scholar Harrison M. Hayford engaged Northwestern University Press to publish definitive editions of Melville's body of work, which would be established through analysis and review of Melville works at the Newberry Library. The library contained 6,100 items, including at least one copy of every printing of each of Melville's books published in his lifetime, since Melville made textual changes. Completed in 2017, the series includes fifteen volumes.

=== Studies in Russian Literature and Theory (SRLT) ===
Founded by Slavicist Gary Saul Morson, Studies in Russian Literature and Theory (SRLT) "provide perspectives on Russian literature from all periods and genres, as well as its place in the broader culture. Authors whose works the series explores include Pushkin, Dostoevsky, Gogol, Tolstoy, Zamyatin, Pasternak, and Nabokov. More than a hundred monographs have been published in the series since 1989. Awards in the series include Jenny Kaminer's Women with a Thirst for Destruction: The Bad Mother in Russian Culture winner of the Heldt "Best book in Slavic/Eastern European/Eurasian women's studies" prize.

=== Curbstone Books ===
In 2010, Northwestern University Press acquired the publisher of international literature and Latin American voices, Curbstone Press. The imprint includes works by Luis Rodríguez, Martín Espada, Gioconda Belli, Claribel Alegria, Salah Al Hamdani, Ana Castillo, Wayne Karlin, E. Ethelbert Miller, Sergio Ramírez, and Le Clézio.

== Honors ==
The Press has received many accolades, including major translation awards for Fyodor Dostoyevsky's Writer's Diary: Volume I, 1873–1876, translated by Kenneth Lantz; Ignacy Krasicki's Adventures of Mr. Nicholas Wisdom, translated by Thomas H. Hoisington; and Petra Hůlová's All This Belongs to Me: A Novel, translated by Alex Zucker. In 1997 the Press won the National Book Award for Poetry for William Meredith's Effort at Speech, followed by a 2011 win for Nikky Finney's Head Off & Split. Several of the Press's titles, including Fording the Stream of Consciousness, Still Waters in Niger, and The Book of Hrabal, have been named Notable Books by The New York Times Book Review. The Press published two novels by the winner of the 2002 Nobel Prize for Literature, Hungarian author Imre Kertész. Florida, a novel by Christine Schutt, was a finalist for a National Book Award in 2004. Northwestern University Press published Herta Müller's novel Traveling on One Leg which won the Nobel Prize for Literature in 2009.

NU Press's "Forest Primeval" won the 2017 Kingsley Tufts Poetry Award, and Patricia Smith's Incendiary Art won the same award in 2019. . Also for "Incendiary Art", Patricia Smith (poet) won the Los Angeles Times Book Prize for poetry in 2018.

== Distributed Presses ==
Northwestern University Press is the distributor for Lake Forest College Press and Tia Chucha Press.

== See also ==
- List of English-language book publishing companies
- List of university presses
