= Parneshia Jones =

American poet (born 1980)

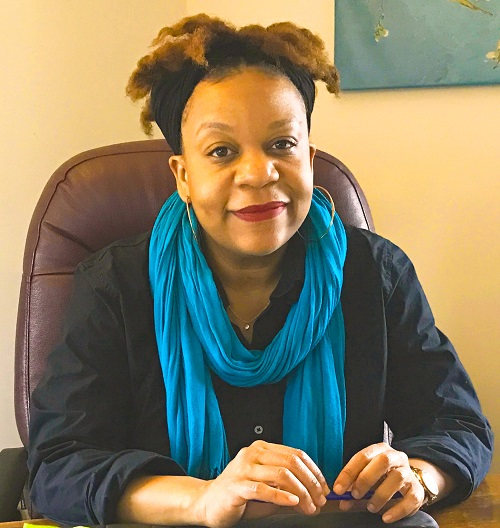
- Jones, Northwestern University Press, 2018
- Born: July 1980 (age 45–46); Evanston, Illinois, U.S.
- Education: Chicago State University; Spalding University
- Occupations: Poet; Publisher
- Employer: Northwestern University Press
- Writing career
- Notable work: Vessel (2015)
- Website: parneshiajones.com

Parneshia Jones (born 1980) is an American publisher, poet, and editor. She is the author of a 2015 poetry collection, Vessel, which won the Midwest Book Award. In 2020, Jones was appointed director of Northwestern University Press.

== Life ==
Hailing from Evanston, Illinois, Parneshia Jones grew up visiting her neighborhood library frequently. When she was in sixth grade, she wrote her first poem, about her brother. Through writing this first piece of poetry, she found her passion for writing and poetry.

Jones graduated from Chicago State University with a Creative Writing degree and went on to get her Master of Fine Arts degree from Spalding University.

She began her career in publishing as an intern at Third World Press, where she worked with Haki R. Madhubuti.

In 2003, aged 22, Jones became a marketing assistant for Northwestern University, where she continued to gain experience as she worked with many different writers. In 2019, she was made Editorial Director for Trade and Engagement. Through her work at Northwestern University, she was able to give People of Color more opportunities in the writing vocation.

In September 2020, Jones was appointed director of Northwestern University Press. She is the second black woman to be a leader at a university press in the United States.

Jones resides in Chicago, Illinois.

== Work ==
An Affrilachian poet, Jones cites her undergraduate experiences at Chicago State University, studying under important black writers and scholars Haki R. Madhubuti, Dr. Kelly Norman Ellis, Dr. B. J. Bolden, Dr. Donda West, and a one-on-one chance meeting with Gwendolyn Brooks, who reviewed and red-marked Jones’ early poems and encouraged her to continue writing, as a milestone in her writing and editing career.

Jones is the author of Vessel (Milkweed Editions, 2015). In this verse collection tracing the intersections of her Midwestern and Southern histories, she documents familial memories; the love of place and food, and a black woman's experience; and reveals that her first name relates to Mount Parnassus. The collection won the Midwest Book Award and was chosen as "One of 12 Books to Savor" by O, The Oprah Magazine.

Jones's work has been published in anthologies including The Ringing Ear: Black Poets Lean South (2007), Poetry Speaks Who I Am (2010), and She Walks in Beauty: A Woman’s Journey Through Poems (edited by Caroline Kennedy, 2011).

== Career ==
At Northwestern University Press, Jones eventually assumed acquisitions duties. She has worked with esteemed authors of Nobel Prize, Pulitzer Prize, Grammy, and National Book Award acclaim. With a particular focus on the TriQuarterly Books imprint of the press, her acquisitions have included Head Off & Split, which earned poet Nikky Finney the National Book Award, and Finney's follow-up collection, Lovechild’s Hot Bed of Occasional Poetry: Poems and Artifacts. Jones acquired Forest Primeval by Vievee Francis, 2017 winner of the Kingsley Tufts poetry award. The following year, Jones acquired Incendiary Art by Patricia Smith, winner of the Kingsley Tufts poetry award and the LA Times Book Prize. Jones has also worked with Kwame Dawes, Angela Jackson, Kyle Dargan, Karl Kirchwey, Ellen Hagan, and Nandi Comer.

In 2019, Jones became a Visiting Writer in Residence at the Vermont College of Fine Arts. She has served as president of the Board of Directors of the Cave Canem Foundation, and is currently on the advisory board of the ShoreFront Legacy Center, an organization and foundation that documents African-American history on Chicago's North Shores.

== Awards ==
Jones has received the Gwendolyn Brooks Poetry Award, a Margaret Walker Short Story Award, and an Aquarius Press Legacy Award.

She has received fellowships and residencies from the Ragdale Foundation, the Lannan Foundation, the Association of University Presses, Princeton University Press, and the Yale University Publishing Course.
