= Rachel Eliza Griffiths =

American poet, photographer and visual artist (born 1978)

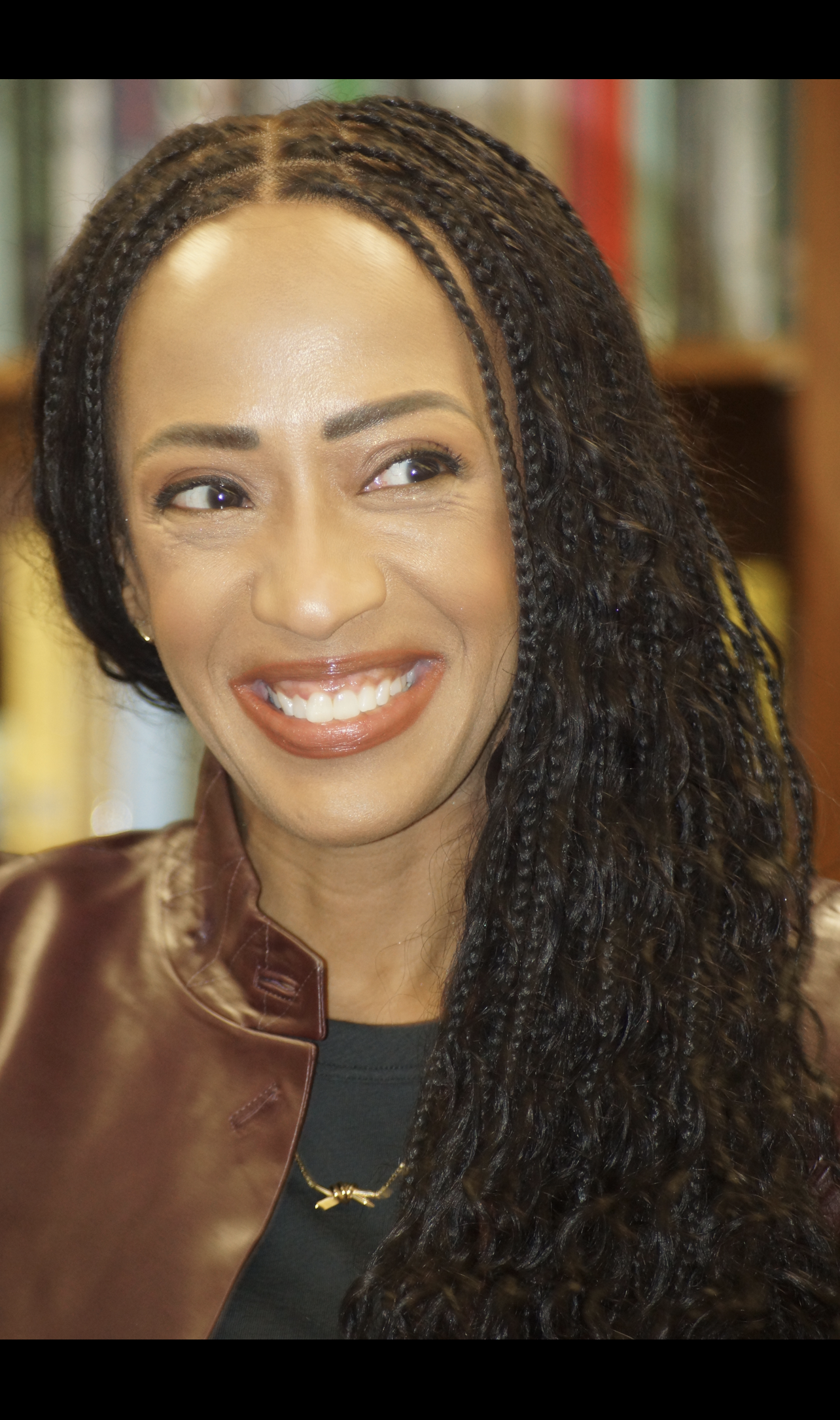
- Griffiths in 2026
- Born: December 6, 1978 (age 47); Washington, D.C., U.S.
- Education: University of Delaware; Sarah Lawrence College (MFA)
- Occupations: Poet, novelist, photographer and visual artist
- Spouse: Salman Rushdie (m. 2021)
- Website: rachelelizagriffiths.com

Rachel Eliza Griffiths (born December 6, 1978), is an American poet, novelist, photographer and visual artist who is the author of five published collections of poems. In Seeing the Body (2020), she "pairs poetry with photography, exploring memory, Black womanhood, the American landscape, and rebirth." The book was a nominee for the 2021 NAACP Image Award in Poetry.

== Early life ==
Griffiths was born in Washington, D.C., on December 6, 1978, the eldest of four children of Michele Antoinette Pray-Griffiths and Norman Dwight Griffiths. Her father was an environmental lawyer, her mother a community organizer and former police officer. Rachel Eliza Griffiths graduated from St. Mark's High School and the University of Delaware, where she earned her undergraduate degree and her first master's degree. She received an MFA in creative writing from Sarah Lawrence College.

== Career ==
Griffiths has been awarded several fellowships, including from Cave Canem Foundation, Kimbilio, Millay Colony, Vermont Studio Center, Provincetown Fine Arts Work Center, Robert Rauschenberg Foundation, and Yaddo.

Her work has been published in The New Yorker, The Paris Review, The New York Times, Virginia Quarterly Review, The Progressive, The Georgia Review, Gulf Coast, Callaloo, Poets & Writers, American Poetry Review, Los Angeles Review of Books, Guernica, The Writer's Chronicle, Transition, American Poet, Mosaic, Indiana Review, and Ecotone Magazine.

In 2011, she was featured in the first poetry issue of Oprah Winfrey's O Magazine.

Griffiths was the creator of the series of video interviews Poets on Poetry (P.O.P), in which contemporary poets discuss poetry "in relation to individual human experience and culture".

She is the author of five collections of poems: Miracle Arrhythmia (2010), The Requited Distance (2011), Mule & Pear (2011), Lighting the Shadow (2015), and Seeing the Body (2020).

Mule & Pear won the 2012 inaugural Poetry Award from the Black Caucus of the American Library Association, and Lighting the Shadow was a finalist for the 2015 Balcones Poetry Prize and for the 2016 Phillis Wheatley Book Award (Poetry category).

In 2020's Seeing the Body, Griffiths uses photography as well as poetry to tell the story of her mother's death in 2014 and, as described by Guernica magazine, "brings together poetry and photography to powerful effect, providing the reader with an experience that's both visually and emotionally arresting". For the Los Angeles Review of Books, "The result is a radiant and soulful collection." Seeing the Body was selected as one of NPR's Best Books of 2020, and was a nominee for the 2021 NAACP Image Award for Outstanding Literary Work – Poetry. Seeing the Body won the 2021 Hurston/Wright Legacy Award for Poetry, and was also the winner of the 2021 Paterson Poetry Prize awarded by the Poetry Center at Passaic County Community College.

Anthologies in which work by Griffiths has appeared include Black Nature: Four Centuries of African American Nature Poetry (edited by Camille T. Dungy, 2009), New Daughters of Africa, edited by Margaret Busby (2019), and The Best American Poetry 2021 (edited by Tracy K. Smith).

Griffiths was chosen as poet-in-residence for 2020 at the Stella Adler Studio of Acting.

In February 2021, Griffiths was guest editor for the Academy of American Poets initiative Poem-a-Day.

Her 2023 debut novel, Promise, was published by Random House in the US, and John Murray in the UK. It was described in Kirkus Reviews as a "stunning and evocative portrait of love, pride, and survival". The Times reviewer said "Promise is by turns enchanting and enraging, and it left me emotionally shattered."

Her memoir, The Flower Bearers, published in January 2026, was described in The Guardian as "simultaneously a love story, a portrait of sisterhood and a visceral depiction of violence, loss and emotional devastation".

== On writing ==
Speaking in 2015 about working in a variety of genres, she said: "I like the fluidity each genre offers me spatially, emotionally, and creatively. I can take an idea, word/fragment, or image and open it up across forms."

In May 2023, the fashion house Chanel honored Siri Hustvedt specifically for a discussion at the Metrograph Theatre in New York City that celebrated women's empowerment through literature. The event was hosted by philosopher and writer Charlotte Casiraghi along with the author and literary critic Erica Wagner. Griffiths was part of the discussion around the mind-body connection that figures so richly in Hustvedt's work. Griffiths contributed to the discussion by expressing her own thoughts on what it means to find your unique voice as an artist. She spoke about her own creative journey, her writing rituals, and how her own work expresses the theme of mind-body connection and empowerment. She spoke especially about her poetical collection Seeing the Body and how it was shaped by her mother's demise. She connected her mother's body with memory, her own and her mother's, and began to recognize that memories (things in the mind) are also mortal. She emphasized that in her work she doesn't divide the heart (body) and mind (memory) but tries hard to express their entanglements. Doing so, she stressed, is important for knowing the self and preventing the distortions that arise from external projections.

== Personal life ==
Griffiths identifies as a "queer black woman".

In 2021, she married Indian-born, British-American novelist Salman Rushdie. As of 2023, they reside in New York City.

== Bibliography ==
- Miracle Arrhythmia (Willow Books, 2010, ISBN 978-0-9846212-0-0)
- The Requited Distance (The Sheep Meadow Press, 2011, ISBN 978-1-931357-91-3)
- Mule & Pear (New Issues Poetry & Prose, 2011, ISBN 978-1-936970-01-8)
- Lighting the Shadow (Four Way Books, 2015, ISBN 978-1-935536-57-4)
- Seeing the Body, poetry and photography (W. W. Norton, 2020, ISBN 978-1-324-02016-5)
- Promise, novel (US: Random House, ISBN 978-0-593-24192-9; UK: John Murray, ISBN 978-1-3998-0981-8, July 2023)
- The Flower Bearers: A Memoir (John Murray/Hachette UK; ISBN 978-1-3998-1401-0
