= TriQuarterly =

American literary magazine and book series

- Issue 44 (Winter 1979) cover
- Categories: Literary magazine
- Frequency: Biannual
- Publisher: Northwestern University
- First issue: 1958; 68 years ago
- Country: United States
- Based in: Evanston, Illinois
- Website: www.triquarterly.org
- ISSN: 0041-3097
- OCLC: 889376903

TriQuarterly is a name shared by an American literary magazine and a series of books.

The journal is published twice a year under the aegis of the Northwestern University Department of English and features fiction, nonfiction, poetry, drama, literary essays, reviews, a blog, and graphic art. The current faculty advisor for TriQuarterly is Natasha Trethewey.

The TriQuarterly book imprint is published by Northwestern University Press.

== Founding ==
TriQuarterly journal was established in 1958 as an undergraduate magazine remembered now for publishing the work of young Saul Bellow. It was reshaped in 1964 by Charles Newman as an innovative national publication aimed at a sophisticated and diverse literary readership. Northwestern University Press, the university's scholarly publishing arm, operated the journal. The journal was so named because its original form as a student magazine was published in each of the three quarters of Northwestern's academic year, and not in the fourth quarter, summer.

== Format change ==
On September 21, 2009, Northwestern University announced three changes to the journal. First, rather than continue under the aegis of Northwestern University Press with paid, professional editors, the journal would become a student-edited publication in 2010. Second, the print edition would cease and the journal would become digital only. Third, the journal would move from the press to the Master of Fine Arts in Creative Writing program (part of Northwestern University's Department of English). The first online edition of TriQuarterly Online, Issue 138, continuing the numbered issue sequence to show continuity from the print edition, launched on July 5, 2010 at the website: Triquarterly.org. The journal is currently housed in the English Department and operates under the aegis of the Litowitz MFA+MA Graduate Program in Creative Writing and English.

Periodicals as varied at the Chronicle of Higher Education and The New Yorker expressed the displeasure of the literary world at the change. One writer described the literary community as "surprised, saddened, shocked" by the change as well as "dismayed" that the journal's editor and associate editor would not be included in the move. Jeffrey Lependorf, executive director of the Council of Literary Magazine and Presses, said the change "doesn’t feel like the passing of the torch; it feels like the extinguishing of the flame.” Another wrote that it highlighted "a harrowing trend in publishing and in academia: the replacement of experienced, paid professionals with under- (or un-) paid casual labor—whether bloggers, graduate students, or adjuncts who often receive neither benefits nor job security."

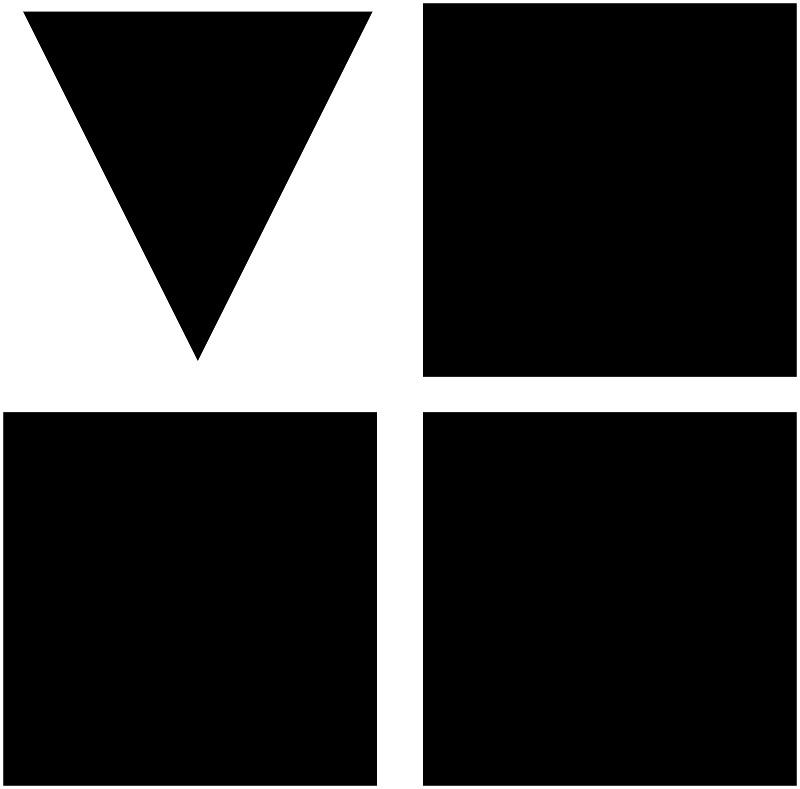
The logo mark for TriQuarterly books, an imprint of Northwestern University Press.

After the university reassigned TriQuarterly journal to the Department of English, Northwestern University Press continued to acquire and publish books in the TriQuarterly imprint, which is edited by Parneshia Jones.

== Influence ==
The physical aspect of many literary journals today derives from the creation of the TriQuarterly design in 1964, credited in The New Yorker as "a venerated publication (it is credited with having pioneered the literary-quarterly format)." By publishing a combination of general issues and occasional special issues, such as for Vladimir Nabokov on his seventieth birthday; Prose for Borges; and The Little Magazine in America: A Modern Documentary History, TriQuarterly quickly became one of the most widely admired and important American literary journals.

== Book series ==
In 1990, Northwestern University Press established a series of new works of fiction and poetry under the imprint name TriQuarterly. Writers such as Nikky Finney, Christine Schutt, A. E. Stallings, Patricia Smith, Bruce Weigl, and Angela Jackson have published titles in the imprint, including works that have won the National Book Award, Whiting Awards, the Kingsley Tufts Poetry Award, and the Hurston/Wright Legacy Award.

== Recognition ==
The New York Times has called TriQuarterly "perhaps the preeminent journal for literary fiction" in America.

== See also ==
- List of literary magazines
