= Erica Wagner =

American author and critic

Erica Wagner FRSL
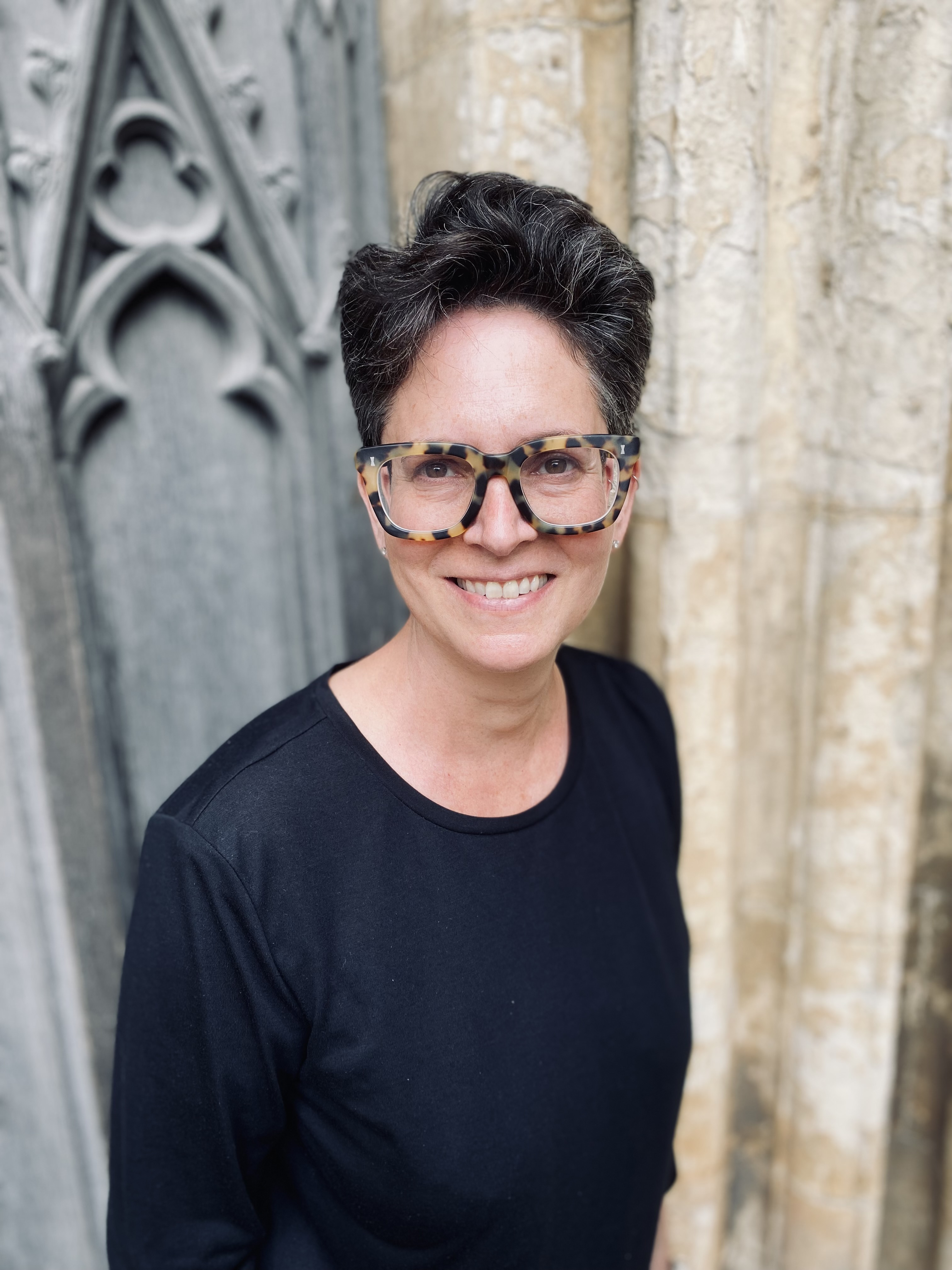
- Born: 1967 (age 58–59); New York City, New York, United States
- Education: The Brearley School; Corpus Christi College, Cambridge; University of East Anglia
- Occupations: Author, critic, editor, writer
- Website: ericawagner.co.uk

Erica Wagner FRSL is an American author and critic, living in London, England. She is former literary editor of The Times.

== Biography ==
Erica Wagner was born in New York City, United States, in 1967. She grew up on the Upper West Side and went to the Brearley School.

She moved to Britain in the 1980s to continue her education, first at St Paul's Girls' School, then at Corpus Christi College, Cambridge (BA), and finally at the University of East Anglia (MA), where she was taught by Malcolm Bradbury and Rose Tremain. She holds an honorary doctorate from the University of East Anglia and is Goldsmiths Distinguished Writers' Centre Fellow, an appointment made in January 2022. She is a Fellow of the Royal Society of Literature.

Her latest book is Wash, a novel published by Salt in 2026. Her other books include Mary and Mr Eliot: A Sort of Love Story, ac collection of short stories, Gravity, Ariel's Gift: Ted Hughes, Sylvia Plath, and the Story of Birthday Letters, and the novel Seizure. She is the author of a biography of Washington Roebling, the engineer who constructed the Brooklyn Bridge.

Wagner was literary editor of The Times between 1996 and June 2013. She reviews for The New York Times and many other publications, including the New Statesman (for which she is a contributing writer), The Economist, The Observer, and the Financial Times. Wagner was selected to be one of the judges for the Man Booker Prize in both 2002 and 2014. She has judged many other literary prizes, including the Goldsmiths Prize, the Forward Prize and the Orwell Prize.

She has hosted the English-language episodes (Les Rencontres) for Chanel's literary podcast, Les Rendez-vous littéraires rue Cambon. This podcast highlights women writers and the empowerment that builds through creative expression. In this work, Wagner speaks to many writers, like Jeanette Winterson, Siri Hustvedt, Rachel Eliza Griffiths, and Rachel Cusk.

She lives in London.

== Bibliography ==
- Gravity (Granta, 1997)
- Ariel's Gift: Ted Hughes, Sylvia Plath and the Story of Birthday Letters (Faber & Faber/W. W. Norton, 2000)
- Seizure (Faber & Faber, W. W. Norton, 2007)
- First Light: A Celebration of Alan Garner (Unbound, 2016)
- Chief Engineer: The Man Who Built the Brooklyn Bridge (Bloomsbury, 2017)
- Mary and Mr Eliot: A Sort of Love Story (Faber & Faber/Farrar, Straus & Giroux, 2023)
- Wash (Salt, 2026)
