= DuEwa Frazier =

American poet

- Born: New York City, U.S.
- Occupation: Writer; performer; educator
- Education: Hampton University (BA); Fordham University (MS); The New School (MFA)

DuEwa Frazier is an American writer, performer, and educator.

Her poems, freelance essays, and editorials have featured in Essence Magazine, Black Renaissance/Renaissance Noire, Eleven Eleven Literary Journal, Crossing the Divide Poetry Anthology, Split This Rock, Kweli Journal, Reverie Journal, PW Review, Poetry Ink Anthology, X Magazine, Brownstone Poets Anthology, Poetry In Performance #37, Black Arts Quarterly (Stanford University), AALBC, Lyrical Times, Allhiphop.com, DaveyD.com, Mosaic, No More Silent Cries, and others.

== Biography ==
=== Early life ===
Frazier was born in Brooklyn, NY and raised in Queens, NY and St. Louis, MO. Her parents encouraged artistic expression by exposing her to theater, dance, music, and literary arts at a young age. She was in her first play at the age of 5, playing civil rights pioneer Rosa Parks. Frazier took early dance lessons in Queens, NY beginning at four years old, and later in St. Louis at Pelagie Green Wren Dance School and Katherine Dunham School of Dance at SIUE in Illinois.

=== Education ===
Frazier earned a Bachelor of Arts degree in English at Hampton University, and a Master of Science degree in Curriculum & Teaching (Literacy) from Fordham University in 2006. Frazier earned an M.F.A. (Master of Fine Arts) degree in Creative Writing at The New School in New York City.

While in graduate school at Fordham, Frazier taught writing as a Writer-In-Residence for Teachers & Writers Collaborative working with students in Brooklyn, NY. As an educator, Frazier has taught adult basic education, English, and theater arts. Frazier designed poetry and writing curriculum to introduce Check the Rhyme Anthology to elementary and secondary school students.

=== Work ===
Frazier is the author of several books of poetry, a children's book, and novels for teens. In addition, Frazier is the editor and publisher of the award-nominated anthology, Check the Rhyme: An Anthology of Female Poets & Emcees (Lit Noire Publishing, 2006). Check the Rhyme Anthology was nominated for both the 2007 NAACP Image Award in Outstanding Literary Work – Poetry and the 2007 AALAS Book Awards in New York. In March 2010, Check the Rhyme received an Honorable Mention for the 17th Annual Writer's Digest International Self Publishing Awards.

Frazier wrote and performed the one-woman poetic show Flash Femininity, which featured commentary on women and AIDS, hip hop, and self-esteem. She performed Flash Femininity in 2003 at Sister's Uptown Bookstore and at The Nuyorican Poet's Café. Frazier was later featured in the poetry arts documentary “Rhyme and Reason” featuring notable slam poets, Taylor Mali, Mayda Del Valle and artist, HBO Def Poetry Jam producer, Danny Simmons. Frazier was featured in the play “Ice Floes” and received an Audience Favorite award for Favorite Actress in the Looking Glass Theater Winter Forum. Frazier was a member of the Harlem-based-playwrights and actors group, River View Players. Frazier featured in the independent short film Passengers of 7D and received her first IMDb acting credit. Frazier has performed her poetry with hip hop, jazz and funk bands at The Shrine NYC, Solomon's Porch, The Nuyorican, Five Spot and other venues.

Frazier has been a featured speaker, author and poet at many venues including: NCTE CCCC Convention, Temple University, West Virginia Wesleyan College, Westhill High School (CT), the Harlem Book Fair, University of Pennsylvania Kelly Writer's House, the Literary Freedom Project, CUNY Poetry Festival, Indianapolis Book Festival and many others. Frazier has been profiled or interviewed in The St. Louis American Newspaper, The St. Louis Argus Newspaper, Rolling Out Urbanstyle Weekly, Booking Matters Magazine, About a Book Mondays, Femmixx.com and others.

== Bibliography ==
=== Teen/YA novels ===
- Deanne in the Middle (2014)
- Quincy Rules (2016)

=== Poetry ===
- Shedding Light From My Journeys (2002)
- Stardust Tracks on a Road (2005)
- Check the Rhyme: An Anthology of Female Poets & Emcees (2006)
- Goddess Under the Bridge: Poems (2013)

=== Children's books ===
- Ten Marbles and a Bag to Put Them In: Poems for Children (2010)
