= Truth Thomas =

American singer-songwriter

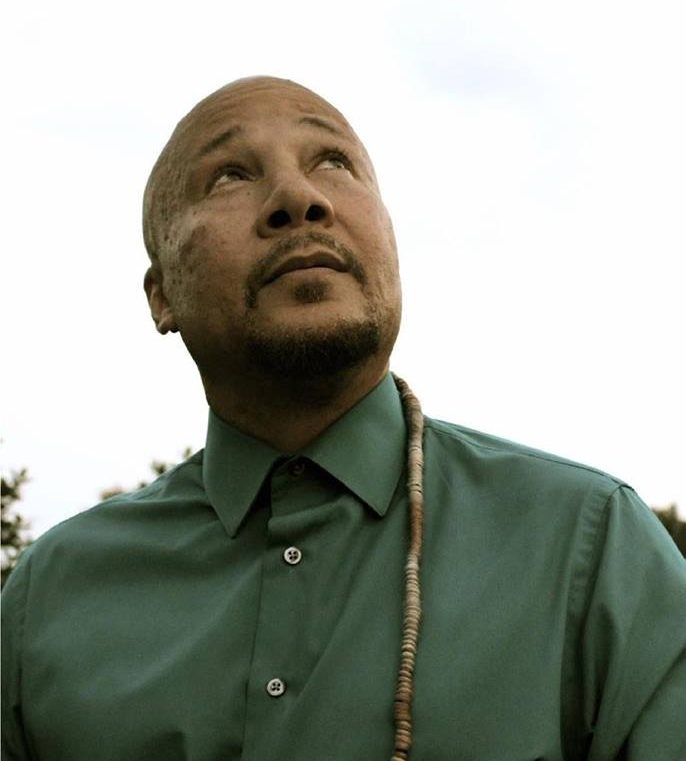
- Born: Glenn Edward Thomas; Knoxville, Tennessee, U.S.
- Education: Howard University; New England College
- Occupations: Musician, Poet, Publisher, Editor
- Writing career
- Genres: Poetry, Music
- Notable works: Speak Water, Take Love, Where We Stand: Poems of Black Resilience, The Skinny Poetry Anthology, Party of Black, Bottle of Life, A Day of Presence

Truth Thomas (born Glenn Edward Thomas in Knoxville, Tennessee) is an American singer-songwriter, poet, editor, publisher and founder of Cherry Castle Publishing, LLC. He is the author of Party of Black (2006), A Day of Presence (2008), Bottle of Life (2010), Speak Water (2012), winner of the 2013 NAACP Image Award for Outstanding Literary Work - Poetry, and My TV is Not the Boss of Me (2013), Jessie Redmon Fauset Book Award Finalist 2014, a children's book, illustrated by Cory Thomas. Thomas is the creator of the fixed form of poetry known as the "Skinny." In addition, he has edited and co-edited a number of anthologies, including Where We Stand: Poems of Black Resilience (Cherry Castle Publishing, 2022),The Skinny Poetry Anthology (Cherry Castle Publishing, 2019), and is the Editor-in-Chief of The Skinny Poetry Journal. During his early music career (recording as Glenn Edward Thomas), his first full-length studio album, Take Love, was produced in 1982 on Capitol Records by Soul Train television show creator and host Don Cornelius. In 1992, Thomas officially changed his name from Glenn Edward Thomas to Truth Thomas. He is a former Writer-in-Residence for the Howard County Poetry and Literature Society (HoCoPoLitSo) and the Inaugural Poet Laureate of Howard County, Maryland. His poems have appeared in over 150 publications, including The 100 Best African American Poems (edited by Nikki Giovanni) and This Is the Honey (edited by Kwame Alexander).

== Early life ==
He was born into an intellectual and musical family. His grandmother was a teacher, a soprano and a violinist. His mother was also a teacher and soprano, who was also a linguist and an accomplished pianist. All of Thomas' aunts, uncles, great aunts and uncles played instruments, from French horns to cornets to trombones. He was surrounded by music as a child in the South, and mentored both by the music of his family and the music of the Tabernacle Baptist Church in East Tennessee.

In the late 1960s, after his family moved to the Washington Metropolitan Area, he spent much of his musical youth at Rock Creek Baptist Church on 8th and Upshur Streets, NW. Before Thomas fell in love with the piano, he played the violin, clarinet and guitar. Among his Washington, D.C. music mentors were drummer Michael L. Johnson and vocalist/percussionist Bobby Thurston of the band, Spectrum, Ltd. Thomas attended Montgomery Blair High School. After graduation, he attended Howard University in Washington, D.C., as a political science major by day, and a burgeoning singer-songwriter by night. While there, Thomas performed with the musical group Members Only and worked at clubs around the local D.C. area along with drummer George Jones, bassist Michael Paige, vocalist Patty Robinson (alto), percussionist Michael Smith and Angela Wray (soprano). He left Howard in 1980, without a degree, to pursue a full-time music career in Los Angeles. In 1981, Don Cornelius signed him to a production agreement with Capitol Records (where he collaborated with O'Bryan and Melvin Lee Davis).

After living and working in Los Angeles and London for many years, Thomas returned to the Washington Metropolitan Area in the early 2000s, where he began the formal study of poetry. In 2004, Thomas returned to his academic pursuits at Howard University, studying Creative Writing under Professor Tony Medina. Truth Thomas received his M.F.A. from New England College in 2008.

== Present day ==
Truth Thomas is active as a poet, editor, publisher and singer-songwriter. His work has been featured in over 150 publications. It focuses largely on matters of race and social justice, both in the United States and worldwide. Regarding his aesthetic, Dr. Randall Horton writes, "Truth Thomas' genius lies in his ability to take us places where we've never been before…" His poems have appeared in magazines and anthologies such as: Poetry, Apogee Journal, The Scores Issue 9, Beltway Poetry Quarterly, Callaloo, The Progressive, The Newtowner Magazine, Black Poets Lean South (Cave Canem Anthology) and The 100 Best African American Poems (edited by Nikki Giovanni). In 2010, he co-founded the Washington, D.C. based literary journal, the Tidal Basin Review, along with poets Melanie Henderson, Dr. Randall Horton and Fred Joiner. He formerly served on the editorial board of the Little Patuxent Review and was a member at-large on the board of the Howard County Poetry and Literature Society (HoCoPoLitSo). In 2012, Thomas founded the press, Cherry Castle Publishing, and also emerged from musical hiatus to sing with jazz saxophonist/composer/bandleader Roy Nathanson of the Jazz Passengers at The Stone (music space) in New York City. In 2013, Thomas won the NAACP Image Award for Outstanding Literary Work – Poetry for his Speak Water poetry collection.

== Awards ==
- 2008: Charles H. Chapman Award from Alpha Phi Alpha fraternity
- 2013: NAACP Image Award for Outstanding Literary Work - Poetry
- 2014: Jessie Redmon Fauset Book Award Finalist

== Books ==
- Party of Black. flipped eye. 2006. ISBN 978-1-905-23312-0.
- A Day of Presence. flipped eye. 2008. ISBN 978-0-9818584-0-1.
- Bottle of Life. flipped eye. 2010. ISBN 978-0-981-85842-5.
- Speak Water. Cherry Castle Publishing. 2012. ISBN 978-0-615-62142-5.
- My TV is Not the Boss of Me. Cherry Castle Publishing. 2014. ISBN 978-0-615-87794-5.

== Discography ==
- 1982: Take Love. Capitol Records ST-12230
- 1996: Truth. Cherry Castle Records
- 2002: If The Spirit is Willing. Cherry Castle Records

== Anthologies ==
- Melissa Tuckey, ed. (2018). "Urban Warming." Ghost Fishing: An Eco-Justice Poetry Anthology. ISBN 978-0820353159
- Thomas Dodson, ed. (2013). "We Too, The Foundation." Best Indie Lit New England, Vol 1 (BiLINE). ASIN B00BB3EQHS
- Jane Ormerod, ed. (2011). "Jacob's Reflections After the Bout." Uphook Press Anthology, gape-seed. ISBN 978-0979979231
- Nikki Giovanni, ed. (2010). "Harriet Tubman's Email 2 Master," "Mississippi Fretless," "I Love it When You Call Me Big Country." The 100 Best African American Poems (Edited by Nikki Giovvani). ASIN B005HKV8IQ
- Nikky Finney, ed. (2007). "Harriet Tubman's Email 2 Master,". The ringing ear: Black poets lean south. ISBN 978-0820329260
- Randall Horton, ed. (2007). "Visiting Hours are Over," "Reflections: A River in Africa." Fingernails Across the Chalkboard: Poetry and Prose on HIV/AIDS from the Black Diaspora. ISBN 978-0883782743
