= The Intentions of Thunder =

2025 poetry collection by Patricia Smith

The Intentions of Thunder: New and Selected Poems
- First edition cover
- Author: Patricia Smith
- Language: English
- Genre: Poetry
- Published: September 30, 2025
- Publisher: Scribner
- Publication place: United States
- Pages: 256
- ISBN: 978-1-66805-572-4

The Intentions of Thunder: New and Selected Poems is a poetry collection by American poet Patricia Smith, published by Scribner on September 30, 2025. The book won the National Book Award for Poetry (2025). It also won the NAACP Image Award for Outstanding Literary Work in Poetry (2026).

== Reception ==
In a starred review, Publishers Weekly called the book a “formidable volume of selected and previously uncollected poems.”

== Awards ==
- National Book Award for Poetry (winner, 2025)
- NAACP Image Award for Outstanding Literary Work – Poetry (winner, 2026)
