= Rosa (children's book) =

2005 book by Nikki Giovanni

- Author: Nikki Giovanni
- Illustrator: Bryan Collier
- Language: English
- Publisher: Square Fish
- Publication date: October 1, 2005
- Publication place: United States
- Pages: 40
- Awards: Caldecott Honor Book, Coretta Scott King Award for Illustrators
- ISBN: 9780805071061

Rosa is a children's picture book written by poet, activist, and educator Nikki Giovanni and illustrated by Bryan Collier. A biography of African-American civil rights activist Rosa Parks, it was adapted to film in 2007 by Weston Woods Studios, Inc., narrated by the author.

Giovanni was the first recipient of the Southern Poverty Law Center's Rosa L. Parks Woman of Courage Award and knew Parks personally through their involvement in civil rights activism. Rosa was published in October 2005, as a celebration of the 50th anniversary of Rosa Parks' historic arrest and the Montgomery bus boycott. Parks died of natural causes later that month at the age of 92.

== Awards ==
Rosa won the Coretta Scott King Award for Illustrators and was a Caldecott Honor Book in 2006.
