= Nikki Giovanni =

American poet, writer and activist (1943–2024)

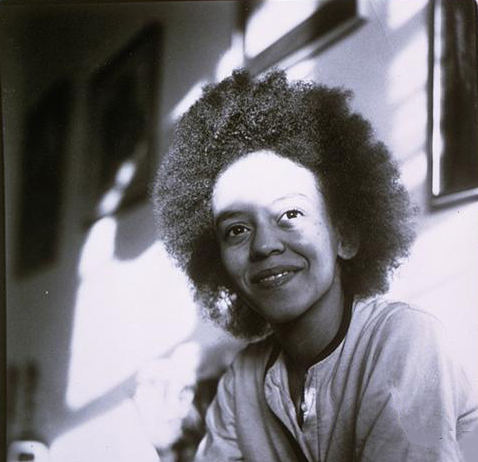
- Giovanni c. 1980
- Born: Yolande Cornelia Giovanni Jr. June 7, 1943; Knoxville, Tennessee, U.S.
- Died: December 9, 2024 (aged 81); Blacksburg, Virginia, U.S.
- Education: Fisk University (BA); University of Pennsylvania; Columbia University
- Occupations: Writer; poet; activist; educator
- Partner: Virginia C. Fowler
- Children: 1
- Writing career
- Period: 1968–2022
- Website: nikki-giovanni.com

Yolande Cornelia "Nikki" Giovanni Jr. (June 7, 1943 – December 9, 2024) was an American poet, writer, commentator, activist and educator. One of the world's best-known African-American poets, her work includes poetry anthologies, poetry recordings, and nonfiction essays, and covers topics ranging from race and social issues to children's literature. She won numerous awards, including the Langston Hughes Medal and the NAACP Image Award. She was nominated for a 2004 Grammy Award for her poetry album, The Nikki Giovanni Poetry Collection. Additionally, she was named as one of Oprah Winfrey's 25 "Living Legends". Giovanni was a member of The Wintergreen Women Writers Collective.

Giovanni gained initial fame in the late 1960s as one of the foremost authors of the Black Arts Movement. Influenced by the Civil Rights Movement and Black Power Movement of the period, her early work provides a strong, militant African-American perspective, leading one writer to dub her the "Poet of the Black Revolution". During the 1970s, she began writing children's literature, and co-founded a publishing company, NikTom Ltd, to provide an outlet for other African-American women writers. Over subsequent decades, her works discussed social issues, human relationships, and hip hop. Poems such as "Knoxville, Tennessee" and "Nikki-Rosa" have been frequently re-published in anthologies and other collections.

Giovanni received numerous awards and held 27 honorary degrees from various colleges and universities. She was also given the key to more than two dozen cities. Giovanni was honored with the NAACP Image Award seven times. She had a South American bat species, Micronycteris giovanniae, named after her in 2007.

Giovanni was proud of her Appalachian roots and worked to change the way the world views Appalachians and Affrilachians.

Giovanni taught at Queens College, Rutgers, and Ohio State, and was a University Distinguished Professor at Virginia Tech until she retired on September 11, 2022. After the Virginia Tech shooting in 2007, she delivered a well-received chant-poem at a memorial for the shooting victims.

== Early life and education ==
Yolande Cornelia "Nikki" Giovanni Jr. was born in Knoxville, Tennessee, to Yolande Cornelia Sr. and Jones "Gus" Giovanni. At age four, the family moved to Lincoln Heights, Ohio, near Cincinnati, where her parents worked at Glenview School. In 1948, the family moved to Wyoming, Ohio, and sometime in those first three years, Giovanni's sister, Gary, began calling her "Nikki". In 1958, Giovanni returned to Knoxville to live with her grandparents and attend Austin High School. As a child, she was an avid reader. In 1960, she began her studies at her grandfather's alma mater, Fisk University in Nashville, as an "early entrant", which meant that she could enroll in college without having finished high school first.

She immediately clashed with the then-Dean of Women and was expelled after not having obtained the required permission from the dean to leave campus and travel home for Thanksgiving break. Giovanni moved back to Knoxville, where she worked at a Walgreens drug store and helped care for her nephew, Christopher. In 1964, Giovanni spoke with the new Dean of Women at Fisk University, Blanche McConnell Cowan, who urged her to return to Fisk that fall. While at Fisk, Giovanni edited a student literary journal (titled Élan), reinstated the campus chapter of the Student Nonviolent Coordinating Committee, and published an essay in Negro Digest on gender questions in the Movement. In 1967, she graduated with honors with a B.A. degree in history.

Soon after graduation, she lost her grandmother, Louvenia Watson, and turned to writing poems to cope with the death. These poems would later be included in her collection Black Feeling, Black Talk. In 1968, Giovanni took a semester at University of Pennsylvania School of Social Work toward an MSW and then moved to New York City. She briefly attended Columbia University School of the Arts toward an MFA in poetry and privately published Black Feeling Black Talk.

== Career ==
In 1969, Giovanni began teaching at Livingston College of Rutgers University. She was an active member of the Black Arts Movement beginning in the late 1960s. In 1969, she gave birth to Thomas Watson Giovanni, her only child. She told Ebony magazine: "I had a baby at 25 because I wanted to have a baby and I could afford to have a baby. I didn't want to get married, and I could afford not to get married."

After the birth of her son, Giovanni was accused of setting a bad example as an unmarried mother, which was uncommon at that time. Giovanni noted that the birth of her son helped her to realize that children have different interests and require different content than adults. This realization led her to write six children's books.

In 1970, Giovanni founded the publishing company NikTom, publishing her own work as well as supporting the work of other Black women writers, among them Gwendolyn Brooks, Mari Evans, Carolyn Rodgers, and Margaret Walker. From 1970, she began making regular appearances on the television program Soul!, an entertainment/variety/talk show that promoted Black art and culture and allowed political expression. In addition to being a regular guest on the show, Giovanni for several years helped design and produce episodes. Giovanni's conversation with James Baldwin on Soul!, filmed in London and broadcast in 1971 as a two-part special, is considered a defining moment in her career, and subsequently became a book.

Giovanni also appeared on other television programs, including The Tonight Show with Johnny Carson in 1972, accruing such popularity that her 30th birthday celebration at the Lincoln Center filled a 3,000-seat hall. Between 1973 and 1987, she published multiple poetry anthologies and children's books, and released spoken-word albums.

In 1987, Giovanni was recruited by her partner and eventual wife Virginia Fowler to teach creative writing and literature at Virginia Tech. There, Giovanni later became a University Distinguished Professor, before retiring in 2022. She received the NAACP Image Award seven times, received 20 honorary doctorates and various other awards, including the Rosa Parks and the Langston Hughes Award for Distinguished Contributions to Arts and Letters. She also held the key to several different cities, including Dallas, Miami, New York City, and Los Angeles. She was a member of the Prince Hall Order of the Eastern Star, she received the Life Membership and Scroll from the National Council of Negro Women, and was an honorary member of Delta Sigma Theta sorority.

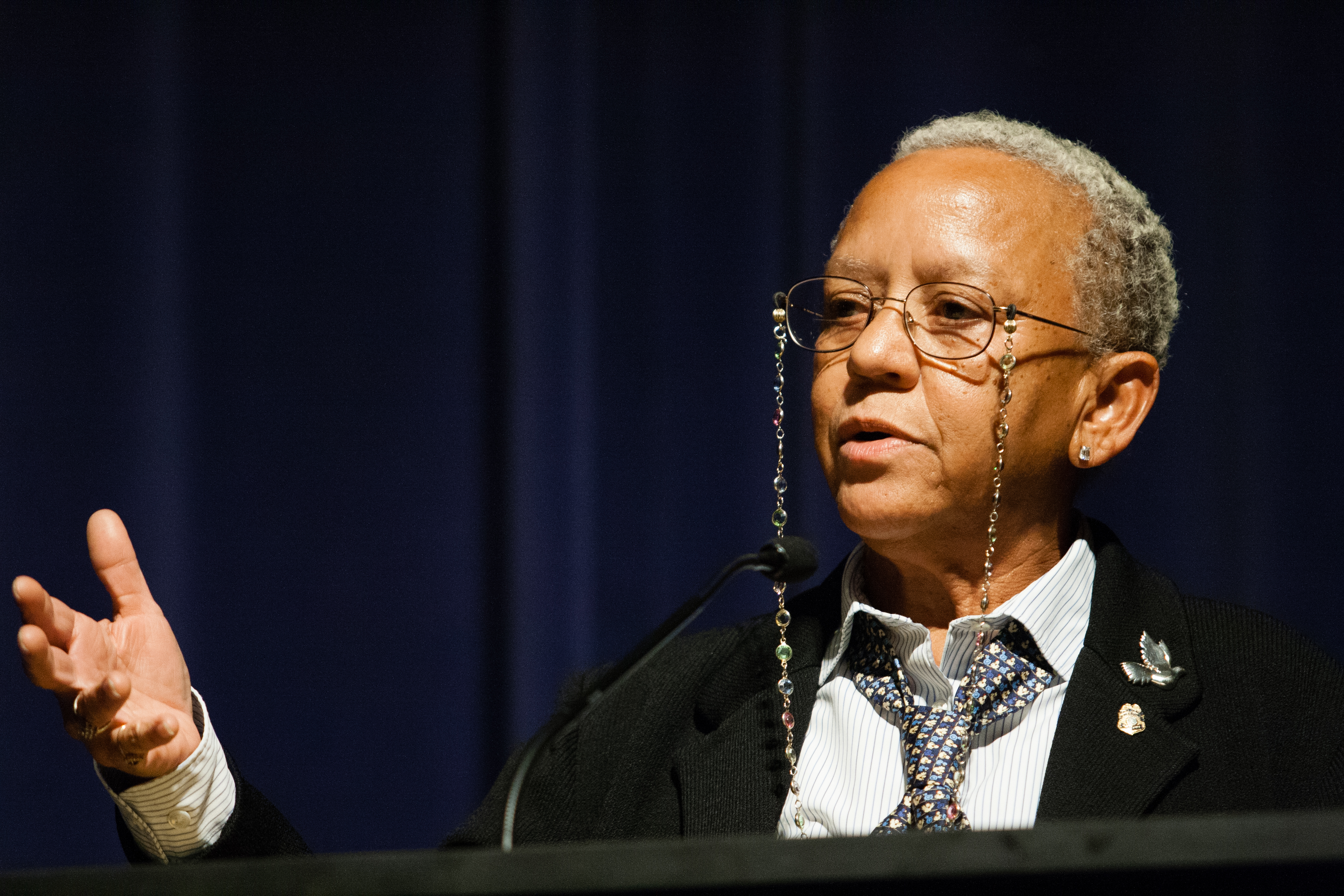
Giovanni speaking at Emory University in 2008

Giovanni was diagnosed with lung cancer in the early 1990s and underwent numerous surgeries. Her book Blues: For All the Changes: New Poems, published in 1999, contains poems about nature and her battle with cancer.

Giovanni toured nationwide and frequently spoke out against hate-motivated violence. At a 1999 Martin Luther King Jr. Day event, she recalled the 1998 murders of James Byrd Jr. and Matthew Shepard: "What's the difference between dragging a Black man behind a truck in Jasper, Texas, and beating a white boy to death in Wyoming because he's gay?"

In 2002, Giovanni, who considered herself a "space freak", spoke in front of NASA about the need for African Americans to pursue space travel, and later published Quilting the Black-Eyed Pea: Poems and Not Quite Poems, which dealt with similar themes.

Giovanni was commissioned by NPR's All Things Considered to compose a poem for Barack Obama's 2009 presidential inauguration. The poem, entitled "Roll Call: A Song of Celebration", ends with the three lines: "Yes We Can/Yes We Can/Yes We Can." Giovanni read poetry at the Lincoln Memorial as a part of the bi-centennial celebration of Abraham Lincoln's birth on February 12, 2009.

During the 2020 United States presidential election, Giovanni appeared in a campaign ad for Joe Biden, reading her poem "Dream".

She was also honored for her life and career by The HistoryMakers, along with being the first person to receive the Rosa L. Parks Women of Courage Award. She was awarded the Presidential Medal of Honor from Dillard University in 2010. In 2015, Giovanni was named one of the Library of Virginia's "Virginia Women in History" for her contributions to poetry, education, and society.

In 2020, Giovanni gave an extended interview to Bryan Knight's Tell A Friend podcast where she gave an assessment of her life and legacy.

Giovanni released an album, The Gospel According to Nikki Giovanni, on February 8, 2022.

She is the subject of the documentary film Going to Mars: The Nikki Giovanni Project, directed by Joe Brewster and Michèle Stephenson, which premiered at and won the Grand Jury Prize for Documentary at the 2023 Sundance Film Festival. The documentary features Giovanni's son and granddaughter, as well as Giovanni's spouse Virginia Fowler, a fellow academic and author.

=== Virginia Tech shooting ===
Seung-Hui Cho, a mass murderer who killed 32 people in the Virginia Tech shooting on April 16, 2007, was a student in one of Giovanni's poetry classes. Describing him as "mean" and "menacing", she approached the department chair to have Cho taken out of her class, and said she was willing to resign rather than continue teaching him. Cho was removed from her class in 2005. After the massacre, Giovanni stated that, upon hearing of the shooting, she immediately suspected that Cho might be the shooter.

Giovanni was asked by Virginia Tech president Charles Steger to give a convocation speech at the April 17 memorial service for the shooting victims (she was asked by Steger at 5:00 pm on the day of the shootings, giving her less than 24 hours to prepare the speech). She expressed that she usually felt very comfortable delivering speeches, but worried that her emotion would get the best of her. On April 17, 2007, at the Virginia Tech convocation commemorating the April 16 massacre, Giovanni closed the ceremony with a chant poem:

We know we did nothing to deserve it. But neither does a child in Africa dying of AIDS. Neither do the invisible children walking the night awake to avoid being captured by a rogue army. Neither does the baby elephant watching his community being devastated for ivory. Neither does the Mexican child looking for fresh water....We are Virginia Tech.... We will prevail.

She thought that ending with a thrice-repeated "We will prevail" would be anticlimactic, and she wanted to connect back with the beginning, for balance. So, shortly before going onstage, she added a closing: "We are Virginia Tech." Her performance received an over 90-second standing ovation from the over-capacity audience in Cassell Coliseum, including then-president George W. Bush.

=== Later life and death ===
Giovanni announced her retirement from Virginia Tech in September 2022, having taught there for 35 years. She was conferred the title of University Distinguished Professor Emerita by the university in December 2022.

On December 9, 2024, Giovanni died of complications from lung cancer in a hospital in Blacksburg, Virginia. She was 81. She had been working on a memoir titled A Street Called Mulvaney, and her final poetry collection, The Last Book, was set for publication in 2025.

== Writing ==
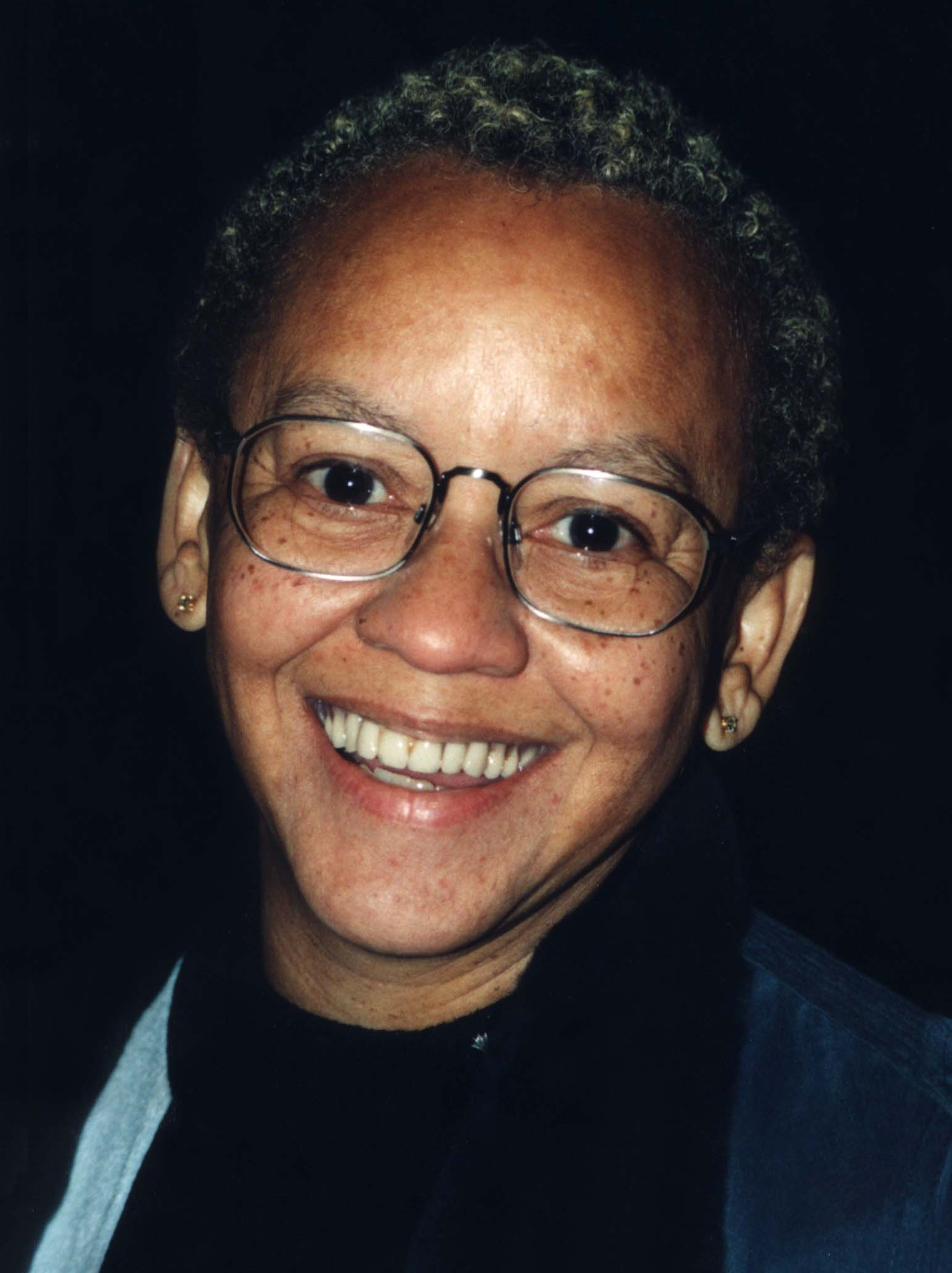
Giovanni in 1997.

The civil rights movement and Black power movement inspired her early poetry, which was collected in Black Feeling, Black Talk (1968), which sold more than 10,000 copies in its first year; in Black Judgement (1968), selling 6,000 copies in three months; and in Re: Creation (1970). In "After Mecca": Women Poets and the Black Arts Movement, Cheryl Clarke cites Giovanni as a woman poet who became a significant part of the civil rights and Black power movements. Giovanni was commonly praised as one of the best African-American poets emerging from the 1960s Black power and Black Arts Movements. Her early poems that were collected in the late 1960s and early 1970s are seen as more radical and militant than her later work. Evie Shockley describes Giovanni as "epitomizing the defiant, unapologetically political, unabashedly Afrocentric, BAM ethos." Her work is described as conveying "urgency in expressing the need for Black awareness, unity, and solidarity." Likewise, Giovanni's early work has been considered to be "polemic" and "incendiary".

In addition to writing about racial equality, Giovanni advocated for gender equality. Rochelle A. Odon states that "Giovanni's realignment of female identity with sexuality is crucial to the burgeoning feminist movement within the black community." In the poem, "Revolutionary Dreams" (1970), Giovanni discusses gender and objectification. She writes, "Woman doing what a woman/Does when she's natural/I would have a revolution" (lines 14–16). Another example of a poem that encourages sexual equality is "Woman Poem" (1968). In "Woman Poem", Giovanni shows that the Black Arts Movement and racial pride were not as liberating for women as they were for men. In "Woman Poem", Giovanni describes how pretty women become sex objects "and no love/or love and no sex if you're fat/get back fat black woman be a mother/grandmother strong thing but not woman."

Giovanni took pride in being a "Black American, a daughter, mother, and a Professor of English." Giovanni was also known for her use of African-American Vernacular English. She wrote more than two dozen books, including volumes of poetry, illustrated children's books, and three collections of essays. Her writing, heavily inspired by African-American activists and artists, also reflects the influence of issues of race, gender, sexuality, and the African-American family.

Giovanni's 1997 book Love Poems was written in memory of Tupac Shakur; she stated that she would "rather be with the thugs than the people talking about them." In 2007, Giovanni wrote a children's picture book titled Rosa, which centers on the life of civil rights leader Rosa Parks. In addition to reaching number three on The New York Times Best Seller list, the book also received a Caldecott Honor, and its illustrator, Bryan Collier, received the Coretta Scott King Award.

Giovanni's poetry reached more readership through her active engagement with live audiences. She gave her first public reading at the New York City jazz club, Birdland. After the birth of her son in 1969, Giovanni recorded several of her poems with a musical backdrop of jazz and gospel music. She began to travel around the world and speak and read to a wider audience. Giovanni aligned herself with the beliefs of Martin Luther King Jr. In 1972, Giovanni interviewed Muhammad Ali on Soul!, where she also read some of her essay "Gemini".

In an interview entitled "I am Black, Female, Polite", A. Peter Bailey questioned her regarding the role of gender and race in her poetry. Bailey specifically addresses the critically acclaimed poem "Nikki-Rosa," and questions whether it is reflective of the poet's own childhood and her experiences in her community. In the interview, Giovanni stresses that she did not like constantly reading the trope of the Black family as a tragedy and that "Nikki-Rosa" demonstrates the experiences that she witnessed in her communities. Specifically, the poem deals with Black folk culture and touches on gender, race, and social issues like alcoholism and domestic violence.

Giovanni's poetry in the late 1960s and early 1970s addressed Black womanhood and Black manhood, among other themes. She co-wrote a book with James Baldwin entitled A Dialogue, in which the two authors speak about the status of the Black man in the household. The interview makes it clear that regardless of who is "responsible" for the home, the Black woman and the Black man should be dependent on one another. Giovanni's early poetry focused on race and gender dynamics in the Black community.

Those Who Ride the Night Winds (1983) acknowledged Black figures. Giovanni collected her essays in the 1988 volume Sacred Cows... and Other Edibles. Her later works include Acolytes, a collection of 80 new poems, and On My Journey Now. Acolytes was her first published volume since her 2003 Collected Poems. Some of the most serious verse links her own life struggles (being a Black woman and a cancer survivor) to the wider frame of African-American history and the continual fight for equality.

Giovanni's collection Bicycles: Love Poems (2009) is a companion work to her 1997 Love Poems. Both works touch on the deaths of her mother, her sister, and those massacred on the Virginia Tech campus. Giovanni chose the title of the collection as a metaphor for love itself, "because love requires trust and balance."

Chasing Utopia: A Hybrid (2013) continues as a hybrid (poetry and prose) work about food as a metaphor and as a connection to the memory of her mother, sister, and grandmother. The theme of the work is love and relationships.

In 2004, Giovanni was nominated for the Grammy Award for Best Spoken Word Album at the 46th Annual Grammy Awards for her album The Nikki Giovanni Poetry Collection. This was a collection of poems that she read against the backdrop of gospel music. She also featured on the track "Ego Trip by Nikki Giovanni" on Blackalicious's 2000 album Nia. In November 2008, a song cycle from her poems, Sounds That Shatter the Staleness in Lives by Adam Hill, was premiered as part of the Soundscapes Chamber Music Series in Taos, New Mexico.

Giovanni was part of the 2016 Writer's Symposium by the Sea at Point Loma Nazarene University. University of California Television published Giovanni's readings at the symposium. In October 2017, Giovanni published her collection A Good Cry: What We Learn from Tears and Laughter, which includes poems that pay homage to the greatest influences on her life who have died, including close friend Maya Angelou, who died in 2014. In 2017, Giovanni presented at a TEDx event, where she read the poem "My Sister and Me".

== Awards and recognition ==
=== Statue ===
On April 16, 2026, statues of Giovanni and three other local African American luminaries were unveiled outside of Covenant Health Park in Knoxville, Tennessee. The other individuals include painter Beauford Delaney, singer Ida Cox, and artist Ruth Cobb Brice.

=== Personal awards ===
- Keys to more than two dozen American cities, including New York, Miami, Los Angeles, and New Orleans
- State Historical markers in Knoxville, Tennessee, and Lincoln Heights, Ohio
- National Endowment for the Arts Fellowship (1968)
- Harlem Cultural Council (1969)
- Woman of the Year, Ebony Magazine (1970)
- Woman of the Year, Mademoiselle magazine (1971)
- Woman of the Year, Ladies' Home Journal (1972)
- National Association of Radio and Television Announcers Award for Best Spoken Word Album, for Truth Is on Its Way (1972)
- Life Membership & Scroll, National Council of Negro Women (1973)
- Woman of the Year, Cincinnati YWCA (1983)
- Induction in the Ohio Women's Hall of Fame (1985)
- Outstanding Woman of Tennessee (1985)
- Duncanson Artist in Residence, The Taft Museum (1986)
- The Post-Corbett Award (1986)
- Ohioana Library Award for Sacred Cows (1988)
- Cecil H. and Ida Green Honors Chair, Texas Christian University (1991)
- Hill Visiting Professor, University of Minnesota (1993)
- Tennessee Writer's Award, The Nashville Banner (1994)
- Tennessee Governor's Award in the Humanities (1996)
- Langston Hughes Medal for Distinguished Contributions to Arts and Letters, City College of New York (1996)
- Artist-in-Residence. The Philadelphia Clef Club of Jazz and Performing Arts (1996)
- Contributor's Arts Award, The Gwendolyn Brooks Center for Black Literature and Creative Writing (1996)
- Living Legacy Award, Juneteenth Festival of Columbus, Ohio (1998)
- Distinguished Visiting Professor, Johnson & Wales University (1998)
- Appalachian Medallion Award, University of Charleston (1998)
- Cincinnati Bi-Centennial Honoree (1998)
- Tennessee Governor's Award in the Arts (1998)
- National Literary Hall of Fame for Writers of African Descent, the Gwendolyn Brooks Center of Chicago State University (1998)
- Inducted into The Literary Hall of Fame for Writers of African Descent (1999)
- United States Senate Certificate of Commendation (2000)
- 2000 Council of Ideas, The Gihon Foundation (2000)
- Virginia Governor's Award for the Arts (2000)
- Rosa Parks Women of Courage Award, first recipient (2002)
- The SHero Award for Lifetime Achievement (2002)
- Inducted into Phi Beta Kappa, Delta of Tennessee chapter, Fisk University (2003)
- The East Tennessee Writers Hall of Fame Award (2004)
- Finalist, Best Spoken Word Grammy (2004)
- Named one of Oprah Winfrey's 25 Living Legends (2005)
- Poet-In-Residence, Walt Whitman Birthplace Association Award (2005)
- Child magazine Best Children's Book of the Year (2005)
- John Henry "Pop" Lloyd Humanitarian Award (2005)
- ALC Lifetime Achievement Award (2005)
- Delta Sigma Theta sorority (Honorary Member) (2006)
- Caldecott Honor Book Award (2006)
- Carl Sandburg Literary Award (2007)
- National Council of Negro Women Appreciation Award (2007)
- Legacy Award, National Alumni Council United Negro College Fund (2007)
- Legends and Legacies Award (2007)
- Black Enterprise Women of Power Legacy Award (2008)
- National Parenting Publications Gold Award (2008)
- Sankofa Freedom Award (2008)
- American Book Award honoring outstanding literary achievement from the diverse spectrum of the American literary community (2008)
- Literary Excellence Award (2008)
- Excellence in Leadership Award from Dominion Power (2008)
- Ann Fralin Award, Taubman Museum of Art (2009)
- Martin Luther King Jr. Award for Dedication and Commitment to Service (2009)
- Art Sanctuary's Lifetime Achievement Award (2010)
- Presidential Medal of Honor, Dillard University (2010)
- Affrilachian Award, University of Kentucky (2011)
- Library of Virginia's Literary Lifetime Achievement Award (2016)
- Maya Angelou Lifetime Achievement Award (2017)
- Ruth Lilly Poetry Prize (2022)

=== Awarded works ===
Year	Award	Category	Work	Result	Ref	Notes
1973	National Book Award		Gemini	Nominated		
1996	Parents' Choice Award		The Sun Is So Quiet	Won		
1998	Children's Reading Roundtable of Chicago Award		Vacation Time	Won		
1998	NAACP Image Awards		Love Poems	Won		
1999	NAACP Image Awards		Blues: For All the Changes	Won		
2003	NAACP Image Awards	Outstanding Literary Work – Fiction	Quilting the Black-Eyed Pea	Won		
2003	American Library Association's Black Caucus Award		Quilting the Black-Eyed Pea	Won		
2004	NAACP Image Awards	Outstanding Literary Work – Fiction	The Collected Poetry of Nikki Giovanni	Finalist		
2008	NAACP Image Awards	Outstanding Literary Work – Poetry	Acolytes	Won		
2009	Carter G. Woodson Book Award	Elementary	Lincoln and Douglass: An American Friendship	Won		
2009	Moonbeam Children's Book Awards	Children's Poetry	Hip Hop Speaks to Children	Silver Award		
2009	NAACP Image Awards		Hip Hop Speaks to Children	Won		
2010	NAACP Image Awards	Outstanding Literary Work – Poetry	Bicycles	Won		
2011	NAACP Image Awards	Outstanding Literary Work – Poetry	100 Best African American Poems	Won		
2014	NAACP Image Awards	Outstanding Literary Work – Poetry	Chasing Utopia: A Hybrid	Finalist		

== Eponym ==
Giovanni's big-eared bat, also known as Micronycteris giovanniae, was named in her honor in 2007. The bat is found in western Ecuador and the naming was given by biologist Robert Baker "in recognition of her poetry and writings".

== Works ==
=== Poetry collections ===
- Black Feeling, Black Talk (1968)
- Black Judgement (1968)
- Re: Creation (1970)
- Black Feeling, Black Talk/Black Judgement (contains Black Feeling, Black Talk and Black Judgement) (1970)
- My House (1972)
- The Women and The Men (1975)
- Cotton Candy on a Rainy Day (1978)
- Woman (1978)
- Those Who Ride The Night Winds (1983)
- Knoxville, Tennessee (1994)
- The Selected Poems of Nikki Giovanni (1996)
- Love Poems (1997)
- Blues: For All the Changes (1999)
- Quilting the Black-Eyed Pea: Poems and Not Quite Poems (2002)
- The Prosaic Soul of Nikki Giovanni (2003)
- The Collected Poetry of Nikki Giovanni: 1968-1998 (2003)
- Acolytes (2007)
- Bicycles: Love Poems (2009) (William Morrow)
- 100 Best African American Poems (2010) [editor] (Sourcebooks MediaFusion)
- Chasing Utopia: A Hybrid (2013) (HarperCollins)
- A Good Cry: What We Learn From Tears and Laughter (2017) (William Morrow)
- Make Me Rain (2020)

=== Children's books ===
- Spin a Soft Black Song (1971)
- Ego-Tripping and Other Poems For Young People (1973)
- Vacation Time: Poems for Children (1980)
- Ego-Tripping and Other Poems for Young People Revised Edition (1993)
  - The Genie in The Jar (1996)
- The Sun Is So Quiet (1996)
- The Girls in the Circle (Just for You!) (2004)
- Rosa* (2005)
- Poetry Speaks to Children: A Celebration of Poetry with a Beat (2005) [advisory editor] (Sourcebooks)
- Lincoln and Douglass: An American Friendship (2008)
- Hip Hop Speaks to Children: A Celebration of Poetry with a Beat (2008) (Sourcebooks)
- The Grasshopper's Song: An Aesop's Fable (2008)
- I Am Loved (2018)
- A Library (2022) Illustrated by Erin K. Robinson

=== Discography ===
- Truth Is On Its Way (Right-On Records, 1971)
- Like a Ripple on a Pond (Niktom, 1973)
- The Way I Feel (Niktom, 1975)
- The Reason I Like Chocolate (Folkways Records, 1976)
- Legacies: The Poetry of Nikki Giovanni (Folkways, 1976)
- Cotton Candy on a Rainy Day (Folkways, 1978)
- Nikki Giovanni and the New York Community Choir* (Collectibles, 1993)
- Every Tone A Testimony (Smithsonian Folkways, 2001)
- The Nikki Giovanni Poetry Collection (2002)
- The Gospel According To Nikki Giovanni (Solid Jackson, 2022) with Javon Jackson

=== Other ===
- (Editor) Night Comes Softly: An Anthology of Black Female Voices, Medic Press (1970)
- Gemini: An Extended Autobiographical Statement on My First Twenty-five Years of Being a Black Poet (1971)
- A Dialogue with James Baldwin (1973)
- (With Margaret Walker) A Poetic Equation: Conversations between Nikki Giovanni and Margaret Walker (1974)
- (Author of introduction) Adele Sebastian: Intro to Fine (poems), Woman in the Moon (1985)
- Sacred Cows ... and Other Edibles (essays) (1988)
- (Editor, with C. Dennison) Appalachian Elders: A Warm Hearth Sampler (1991)
- (Foreword) The Abandoned Baobob: The Autobiography of a Woman (1991)
- Racism 101* (essays, 1994)
- (Editor) Grand Mothers: Poems, Reminiscences, and Short Stories about the Keepers of Our Traditions (1994)
- (Editor) Shimmy Shimmy Shimmy Like My Sister Kate: Looking at the Harlem Renaissance through Poems (1995)
- Foreword to Daryl Cumber Dance (ed.), Honey, Hush!: An Anthology of African American Women's Humor (1998)
- (Editor) 100 Best African American Poems (2010)
- (Afterword) Continuum: New and Selected Poems by Mari Evans (2012)
- (Foreword) Heav'nly Tidings From the Afric Muse: The Grace and Genius of Phillis Wheatley by Richard Kigel (2017)
- (Featured Artist) Artemis 2017 (Academic Journal of southwest Virginia) (2017)
- (Foreword) Black Ink: Literary Legends on the Peril, Power, and Pleasure of Reading and Writing (2018)
