= Suddenly We =

2023 poetry collection by Evie Shockley

suddenly we
- Author: Evie Shockley
- Publisher: Wesleyan University Press
- Publication date: March 7, 2023
- Pages: 106
- ISBN: 978-0819500458
- Preceded by: Semiautomatic

Suddenly We (stylized as suddenly we) is a 2023 poetry collection by Evie Shockley, published by Wesleyan University Press for the Wesleyan Poetry Series. It was a finalist for the 2023 National Book Award for Poetry.

== Contents ==
The book, published in 2023, concerns many themes including but not limited to the COVID-19 pandemic, police brutality and anti-blackness writ large, and community. In Electric Literature, Shockley stated: "With the exception of the series of poems in 'the beauties: third dimension,' each poem had its own genesis in one of the myriad occasions, ideas, and emotions that constitute the vast territory I (we) have traversed in the past six years." It also interfaces with many social, political, and historical figures, as well as artists, whom Shockley found inspirational including Dannielle Bowman and Alma Thomas. The front epigraph has quotes from Aretha Franklin, Alexis Pauline Gumbs, Bernice Johnson Reagon, and others.

== Critical reception ==
In a starred review, Publishers Weekly called the book a "verbally and visually stirring outing" and said "This collection is a welcome companion for that ride as it celebrates the collective, the 'we' that is vital to survival." Also in a starred review, Library Journal called it "Another accomplished work from Shockley; highly recommended."

Critics observed the unique ways Shockley handled serious subject matter. Dean Rader, in conversation with Victoria Chang for The Los Angeles Review of Books, stated "I admire Shockley’s marriage of the political and the playful. That first section is chock full of short, almost silly, lyrics that use font and white space in joyous ways. I love her puns, and I really never say that about puns." Chang commented: "Perhaps the play in Shockley’s book is one of subversion or protest. I’m interested in how play doesn’t diminish the subject matter in the work but supplements it." Electric Literature called the book "a visually exciting, linguistically dynamic, and altogether thrilling shapeshifter of a collection". LitHub noted "Much of the book engages with ekphrasis or, at least, a kind of conversation with visual work."
