= Incendiary Art =

2017 poetry collection by Patricia Smith

- Cover of first edition
- Author: Patricia Smith
- Language: English
- Genre: Poetry
- Publisher: TriQuarterly Books
- Publication date: February 15, 2017
- Publication place: United States
- Media type: Print (paperback), e-book
- Pages: 144
- Awards: 2018 Kingsley Tufts Poetry Award; 2017 Los Angeles Times Book Prize; 2018 NAACP Image Award
- ISBN: 978-0-8101-3433-1 (paperback)
- OCLC: 1033415329
- Dewey Decimal: 811.54
- LC Class: PS3569.M537839 I53 2017

Incendiary Art is a collection of poems written by American poet, Patricia Smith. It was published on February 15, 2017, by TriQuarterly Books, an imprint of Northwestern University Press. This collection was written as a response to the violent deaths of African American males and females in the United States, with a focus on the grief of the mothers who try to protect them, to no avail. Its title is a reference to the role of fire in African American lives, including the burning of Ku Klux Klan crosses and the burning spurred by riots in Black communities across America.

The collection was awarded the 2018 Kingsley Tufts Poetry Award and was a finalist for the 2018 Pulitzer Prize for Poetry.

== Contents ==
The collection is centered around a series of poems based on a 13-year-old African-American male named Emmett Till from Chicago who, while visiting his relatives during the summer of 1955 in Mississippi, was violently murdered after being accused of offending a white woman. The murderers, Bryant and Milam were acquitted by an all white jury. The series of poems are entitled: "Emmett Till: Choose Your Own Adventure", inspired by the children's book series Choose Your Own Adventure, where the reader can choose their own ending to the story by turning to certain pages and following that trajectory. Smith uses this device to imagine what would have happened to Till under various different circumstances.

Incendiary Art contains a series of poems divided into four headings, including: Incendiary, When Black Men Drown Their Daughters, Accidental, and Shooting Into the Mirror. The poetic forms such as prose poems, villanelles, sonnets, and sestinas are some of the techniques employed in the poems.

== Poems ==
I. Incendiary

1. "That Chile Emmett in that Casket"
2. "Enigma of the Shadowbox Swine"
3. "Incendiary Art"
4. "BlessBlessed"
5. "Incendiary Art: MOVE, Philadelphia, 1985"
6. "Emmett Till: Choose Your Own Adventure"
7. "The Then Where"
8. "Incendiary Art: Chicago, 1968"
9. "Reemergence of the Noose"
10. "Emmett Till: Choose Your Own Adventure"
11. "ReBirthday"
12. "Incendiary Art: Birmingham, 1963"
13. "Runaway"
14. "10-Year-Old Shot Three Times, but She's Fine"
15. "Emmett Till: Chose Your Own Adventure"
16. "Hey, who you got in here?"
17. "Incendiary Art: Los Angeles, 1992"
18. "See What Happen When You Don't Be Careful"
19. "Mammy Two-Shoes, Rightful Owner of Tom, Addresses the Lady of the House"
20. "Incendiary Art Ferguson, 2014"
21. "XXXL"
22. "Emmett Till: Choose Your Own Adventure"
23. "How to Bust into a Back Man's House and Take a Boy Out"

II. When Black Men Drown Their Daughters

1. "The Five Stages of Drowning"
2. "Sentencing"
3. "Why the Verdict Just Don't Sound Right; or, The Bobbing Baby Blues"
4. "This is no movie"
5. "On every inch of me, there are rumors of fathers"
6. "Meanwhile, the Mother"
7. "When Black Men Drown Their Daughters"
8. "Blurred Quotient and Theory"

III. Accidental

1. "Sagas of the Accidental Saint"
2. "The Mother Dares Make Love Again, After"

IV. Shooting into the Mirror

1. "Sometimes"
2. "Elegy"
3. "The First 23 Minutes of the First Day Without Requiem"
4. "Requiem"
5. "And He Stays Dead"
6. "Emmett Till: Choose Your Own Adventure"
7. "Incendiary Art: The Body"

== Reception ==
Publishers Weekly praised Smith's "razor-sharp linguistic sensibilities", singling out "Elegy" as one of the collection's best poems.

The collection was also reviewed in The Kenyon Review and Harvard Review.

== Awards ==
- 2018 Kingsley Tufts Poetry Award, winner
- 2017 Los Angeles Times Book Prize for Poetry, winner
- 2018 NAACP Image Award for Outstanding Literary Work, Poetry, winner
- 2018 Black Caucus of the American Library Association Best Poetry Award, winner
- 2018 Pulitzer Prize for Poetry, finalist
