= Zamyatin =

Zamyatin is a surname. Notable people with the surname include:

- Denis Zamyatin (footballer, born 1988), Russian football player
- Denis Zamyatin (footballer, born 2002), Russian football player
- Leonid Zamyatin, Soviet ambassador and diplomat
- Valeriy Zamyatin, Ukrainian futsal player
- Yevgeny Zamyatin, Russian writer
