= Jamaal May =

American poet from Detroit (born 1982)

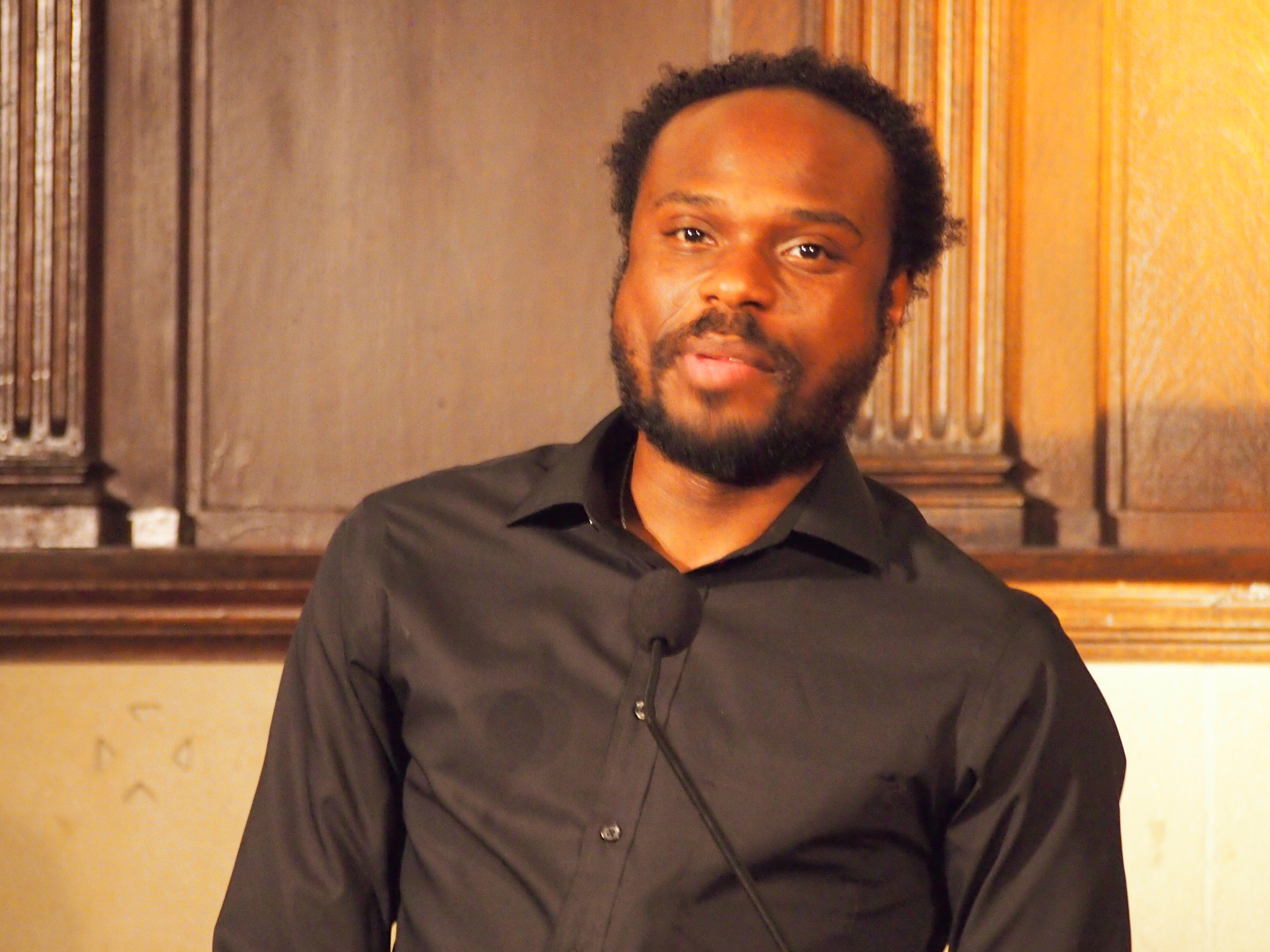
- Georgetown University
- Born: 1982 (age 43–44); Grosse Pointe, Michigan
- Occupations: Poet, Professor

Jamaal May (born 1982) is an American poet from Detroit.

== Life and career ==
May lived in Detroit, where he taught poetry in public schools as a Writer-in-Residence with InsideOut Literary Arts. He received an MFA from Warren Wilson College. May has taught at the Vermont College of Fine Arts, and was a fellow at the Kenyon Review between 2014 and 2016. May cites Vievee Francis, another poet from Detroit, as an influence and mentor.

His work has appeared in the Best American Poetry 2014, The Believer, Poetry, and Ploughshares . His first book, Hum, received generally favorable reviews.

== Bibliography ==
- The God engine: poems, Columbus, Ohio: Pudding House Publications, 2009. OCLC 752432089
- The whetting of teeth: and other poems, Detroit, Mich.: Organic Weapon Arts, 2012. ISBN 9780982710623, OCLC 823602995
- Hum, Alice James Books, 2013
- The Big Book of Exit Strategies Farmington, Maine: Alice James Books, 2016. ISBN 9781938584244, OCLC 920019109

In Anthology

- Ghost Fishing: An Eco-Justice Poetry Anthology. University of Georgia Press, 2018. OCLC 1004957170
