= Mosaic (literary magazine) =

Mosaic is a literary magazine, published by the nonprofit Literary Freedom Project, which focuses on African-American and African diaspora literature. They began publishing in 1998, and are located in the Bronx, NY. The magazine is published on a triannual basis in February, June, and October.
