= Patricia Smith (poet) =

American poet (born 1955)

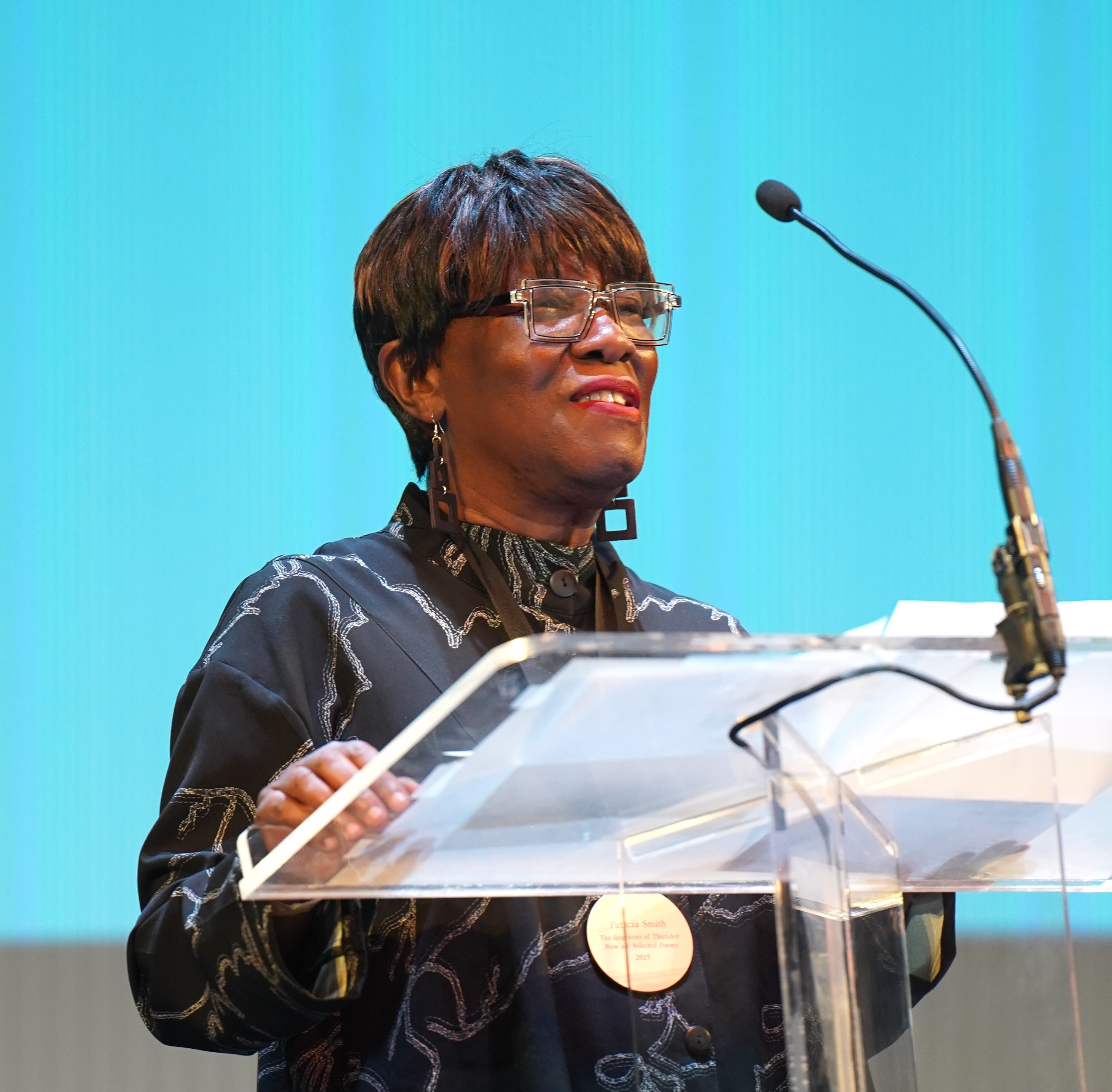
- Reading at the Library of Congress, 2013
- Born: 1955 (age 70–71); Chicago, Illinois, U.S.
- Occupations: Slam poet; spoken-word performer; playwright; author; writing teacher; journalist
- Spouse: Bruce DeSilva
- Writing career
- Genre: Poetry
- Notable awards: National Book Award for Poetry (2025); Pulitzer Prize for Poetry Finalist (2026); Ruth Lilly Poetry Prize (2021); Four-time National Poetry Slam champion

Patricia Smith (born 1955) is an American poet, spoken-word performer, playwright, author, writing teacher, and former journalist. She won the 2025 National Book Award for Poetry for her collection The Intentions of Thunder: New and Selected Poems; in 2026, the collection was named a finalist for the Pulitzer Prize for Poetry.

== Career ==
Smith has published poems in literary magazines and journals including TriQuarterly, Poetry, The Paris Review, Tin House, and in anthologies including American Voices and The Oxford Anthology of African-American Poetry. She was formerly on the faculty of the Stonecoast MFA Program in Creative Writing and the Low-Residency MFA Program in Creative Writing at Sierra Nevada University.

She is a four-time individual National Poetry Slam champion and is featured in the documentary film SlamNation (1998), directed by Paul Devlin, about the 1996 National Poetry Slam in Portland, Oregon. She also appears in the video The 2000 National Poetry Slam Finals, which documents Finals Night at the 2000 National Poetry Slam in Providence, Rhode Island.

Patricia Smith is hailed as the first African-American woman to publish a weekly metro column for the Boston Globe. Her many accomplishments include a Guggenheim fellowship, acceptance as a Civitellian, a National Endowment for the Arts grant recipient, and two-time winner of the Pushcart Prize. She is a former fellow of Yaddo and the MacDowell Colony, and she is the most successful poet of the National Poetry Slam competition. Currently, Smith is a professor at the Lewis Center for the Arts at Princeton University, a core faculty member in the MFA program at Sierra Nevada University, and a resident in VONA and in the Vermont College of Fine Arts Post-Graduate Residency Program.

She has read her poetry at venues including the Poets Stage in Stockholm, Urban Voices in South Africa, Rotterdam's Poetry International Festival, the Aran Islands International Poetry and Prose Festival and on tour in Germany, Austria and Holland. In the U.S., she's performed at the National Book Festival, Carnegie Hall, and the Dodge Poetry Festival.

The book Blood Dazzler was the basis for a dance/theater production which sold out a week-long series of performances at New York's Harlem Stage.

A selection of Smith's poetry was produced as a one-woman play by Nobel Prize-winner Derek Walcott and performed at both Boston University Playwrights Theater and the historic Trinidad Theater Workshop. Another play, based on Life According to Motown, was staged by Company One Theater in Hartford, Ct., and reviewed favorably in The New York Times.

In an interview with Tony Leuzzi (a poet known for his Fib poetry and the poem "The Burning Door""), Smith talks about how she started writing poetry. She says: "I got introduced to poetry via the stage, where there isn't a place to crawl behind the language." Smith talks about her first Chicago slam poetry night where she performed her poems for the first time. This scene became Smith's social circle as well as her recreational exercise, but after performing for a while, people began to view Smith's poems as literature rather than just performance. These people challenged Smith to make a commitment to her writing. Smith discusses how she had written four poetry books before admitted into an MFA program. Though the MFA program taught her the "bones and muscles of language," the poet claims she established herself as a poet and her content way before her academic studies. Smith responds to Leuzzi's question about attending an MFA program later in life by affirming the freedom she had in academics because she was already an established and published poet, so Smith did not need to go after grants and awards or university validation.

In addition to her poetry and journalism, Patricia Smith is also a performer in two one-woman plays and in a one-woman show called Professional Suicide. In Priya Parmar and Bryonn Bain's article "Spoken Word and Hip Hop: The Power of Urban Art and Culture", the authors argue that Smith along with Taylor Mali and Saul Williams ushered in a new era of poetry in the film documentary SlamNation. Smith has contributed to various notable anthologies including Unsettling America: An Anthology of Contemporary Multicultural Poetry, Aloud: Voices from the Nuyorican Poets Café, Short Fuse: The Global Anthology of New Fusion Poetry, Bum Rush the Page, The Oxford Anthology of African American Poetry and Pushcart Prize XXXII: Best of the Small Presses.

In addition to her personal works, she also offers individual and group rates for poetry instruction from kindergarteners to senior citizens.

== Works ==
As her first book, Patricia Smith published Life According to Motown in September 1991 and now it has been republished for the 20th anniversary edition. Like much of her poetry, this collection draws upon her roots in Chicago during the 1960s, recounting lessons learned through the hardships and glamour of Motown. After Life According to Motown, Smith published Big Towns, Big Talks which serves as a type of sequel to its predecessor, examining life after childhood in Chicago.

In September 1993, Smith published Close to Death, which explores black male life expectancy in relation to homicide, drug abuse, and AIDS. Smith's poems give voice to the thousands of black males in New York City, Chicago, and Boston who have run out of options and expect to die without first given a chance to live. Publishers Weekly says, "Her acute ear for the intricacies of speech adds to the vitality of poems written in the voice of black men she encounters amid the inner-city squalor of Chicago and Boston." Her Teahouse of the Almighty is a collection of her free-verse poems on various topics such as love, family, religion, feminism, and the role of poetry. The poem "Boy Dies, Girlfriend Gets His Heart" is about an actual event where a fifteen-year-old boy gave his heart to his girlfriend, and in another poem, Smith discusses her views on religion and her Baptist upbringing. Many critics have praised this work: Diane Scharper in Library Journal called it a "stunning mix of sound and sense and a Publishers Weekly critic stated: "Smith appears to be that rarest of creatures, a charismatic slam and performance poet whose artistry truly survives on the printed page."

She authored a book of history, Africans in America: American's Journey through Slavery, that was commissioned to accompany a PBS series of the same name, and which included short passages written by Charles Johnson and the WGBH Series Research Team.

Her collection Incendiary Art grapples with black bodies of the African-American community against the backdrop of the killing of Emmett Till. This collection uses various forms of poetry such as prose, ghazels, sestinas, and sonnets.

In Gotta Go Gotta Flow, Patricia Smith combines her poems with Michael Abramson's photography of the '70s in Chicago's South Side. Donna Seman from Booklist praised this collection, saying that it is "a supremely arresting and affecting match of potent images and singing words."

For Shoulda Been Jimi Savannah, Smith won three awards: the Lenore Marshall Poetry Prize, the Rebekah Bobbitt National Prize for Poetry, and the Phillis Wheatley Book Award in Poetry. The collection contains poems about the urban areas of Chicago and Detroit, discussing themes of first love, Motown, personal narrative, and cultural journey. Gregory Orr, judge of the 2014 Lenore Marshal Prize, said that her poems "plunge to the soul-depths of the people who inhabit them."

== Journalism controversy ==
As an editorial assistant at the Chicago Sun-Times in the late 1980s, she wrote a review of a concert that she allegedly had not attended.

She gained notoriety when The Boston Globe asked her to resign after editors discovered her metro column contained fictional characters and fabricated events in violation of journalism practice. Smith admitted to four instances of fabrications in her columns, and Globe management indicated that it believed another 52 of Smith's columns involved fictional characters. Speaking in 2015 of her subsequent career, the Globe editor who discovered her fabrications, Walter V. Robinson, noted: "The fact of the matter is that in life, for all of us, we are judged very much by how we bounce back from adversity.... In that sense, I'm really heartened by what's happened in her life."

== Awards ==
=== Poetry ===
Her book Shoulda Been Jimi Savannah was awarded the 2014 Rebekah Johnson Bobbitt Award. She is also a 2008 National Book Award finalist, winner of the Hurston/Wright Legacy Award in Poetry, the Carl Sandburg Literary Award, the National Poetry Series award, the Patterson poetry award, two Pushcart Prizes, and the Rattle poetry prize. She also won the Robert L. Fish Memorial Award for short story writing and had work selected to appear in both Best American Poetry and Best American Essays. In 2006, she was inducted into the International Literary Hall of Fame for Writers of African Descent, and she was the recipient of both McDowell and Yadoo fellowships. For Shoulda Been Jimi Savannah she won the Lenore Marshall Prize, presented by the Academy of American Poets in recognition of "the most outstanding book of poetry" published in America the previous year. And "Incendiary Art" won the NAACP Image Award and was named a Finalist for the Pulitzer Prize.

"Incendiary Art," a 2017 collection of poems published by Northwestern University Press won the 2018 Kingsley Tufts (Kingsley and Kate Tufts Poetry Awards) poetry award and the 2018 NAACP Image Award for Outstanding Literary Work – Poetry. The collection also won the Los Angeles Times Book Prize for poetry.

=== Journalism ===
Smith won the Distinguished Writing Award for Commentary from the American Society of Newspaper Editors (ASNE), 1997. However, The Boston Globe returned the ASNE award and withdrew her from consideration for a Pulitzer Prize after the newspaper acknowledged that some of her columns contained fabricated people, events, and quotes.

== Personal life ==
Patricia Smith was born in 1955 in Chicago, Illinois. She attended Southern Illinois University and Northwestern University.

Smith is married to Bruce DeSilva, a journalist and Edgar Award-winning author. She lives in Howell, New Jersey.

== Bibliography ==
=== Poetry collections ===
- The Intentions of Thunder: New and Selected Poems, 2025, winner of the National Book Award.
- Incendiary Art: Poems poems about Emmett Till, Northwestern University Press, 2016.
- Smith, Patricia (2012). Shoulda Been Jimi Savannah. Coffee House Press.
- Blood Dazzler - poems about Hurricane Katrina, Coffee House Press, 2008, a National Book Award finalist.
- Teahouse of the Almighty - selected as a National Poetry Series winner, published in 2006 by Coffee House Press
- Close to Death - poetry, 1993, Zoland Books
- Big Towns, Big Talk - poetry, 1992, Zoland Books
- Life According to Motown - poetry, 1991, Tía Chucha Press

=== List of poems ===
Title	Year	First published	Reprinted/collected
Laugh your trouble away	2011	Smith, Patricia (Fall–Winter 2011). "Laugh your trouble away". Sugar House Review. 5.	Smith, Patricia (2013). "Laugh your trouble away". In Henderson, Bill (ed.). The Pushcart Prize XXXVII : best of the small presses 2013. Pushcart Press. pp. 358–360.

=== Non-fiction ===
- Africans in America - history, companion book to the PBS television series of the same name, Harcourt Brace, 1998 (co-authored with Charles Johnson)

=== Children's books ===
- Janna and the Kings - 2003, Lee & Low, winner of the New Voices Award for new children's book authors

== See also ==
- Poetry slam
- Journalism scandals
