= Evie Shockley =

American poet, academic

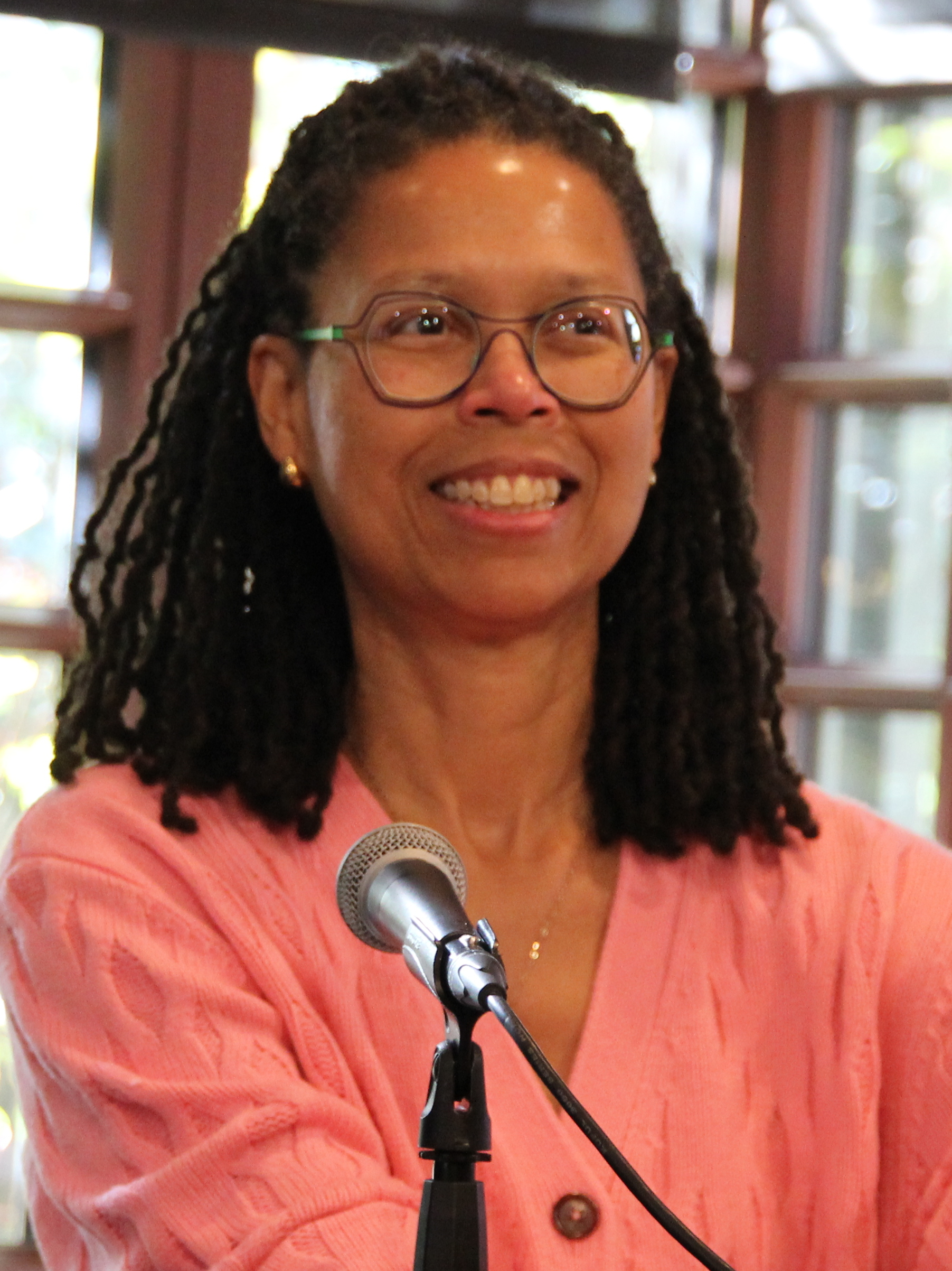
- Shockley in 2023
- Born: Nashville, Tennessee
- Occupation: poet, writer
- Education: Northwestern University (BA); University of Michigan (JD); Duke University (PhD)

Evie Shockley is an American poet. Shockley received the 2012 Hurston/Wright Legacy Award in Poetry for her book the new black and the 2012 Holmes National Poetry Prize. She was a Pulitzer Prize finalist in 2018.

== Early life and education ==
Born in 1965, Shockley is originally from Nashville, Tennessee. Shockley received a BA from Northwestern University, studied law at the University of Michigan from whence she received her JD, and received a PhD in English from Duke University.

== Career ==
Shockley began as an instructor at Wake Forest University in Winston-Salem, North Carolina. In 2002, she started her career as an assistant professor at Rutgers University-New Brunswick in New Jersey.

Her work toured South Africa in 2007 as part of Biko 30/30, an exhibit dedicated to activist Steve Biko.

She published the book Renegade Poetics: Black Aesthetics and Formal Innovation in African American Poetry in 2011. The book explores the poetics of the Black Arts Movement.

the new black, published in 2011 was lauded by poet Le Hinton and he also said Shockley was the "present and future of poetry." In this book her poetry draws connections within our culture, for instance a poem that cites statistics and black lives through poetry.

In 2017 Shockley released her book of poetry, semiautomatic. Her work includes a kind of collage style that mixes more tradition forms with quizzes or labels and compares historical figures and contemporary cultural icons with scenes of civil rights movements and atrocities of the twenty first century. The title plays with the same kind of pun referring to the gun and also her take on a cycle of contemporary reactions to violence. She dedicated this book to Alicia Garza, Patrisse Cullors, and Opal Tometi who founded Black Lives Matter.

=== Awards ===
In 2012 she was awarded The Holmes National Poetry Prize. She was a MacDowell Colony Fellow in 2013. Shockley's book, the new black, won the 2012 Hurston/Wright Legacy Award. semiautomatic was a 2017 finalist for The Believer Poetry Award and the LA Times Book Prize.

== Bibliography ==
=== Poetry ===
Collections

- The Gorgon Goddess. Carolina Wren Press. 2001.
- a half-red sea (Carolina Wren Press, 2006)
- 31 words * prose poems (Belladonna* Books, 2007)
- the new black (Wesleyan University Press, 2011). 2012 Hurston/Wright Legacy Award in Poetry.
- semiautomatic (Wesleyan University Press, 2017)
- suddenly we. 2023.

List of poems

Title	Year	First published	Reprinted/collected
the blessings	2023	Shockley, Evie (February 13–20, 2023). "the blessings". The New Yorker. 99 (1): 56.	

=== Non-fiction ===
- Renegade Poetics: Black Aesthetics and Formal Innovation in African American Poetry (University Of Iowa Press, 2011)
