= Maria (given name) =

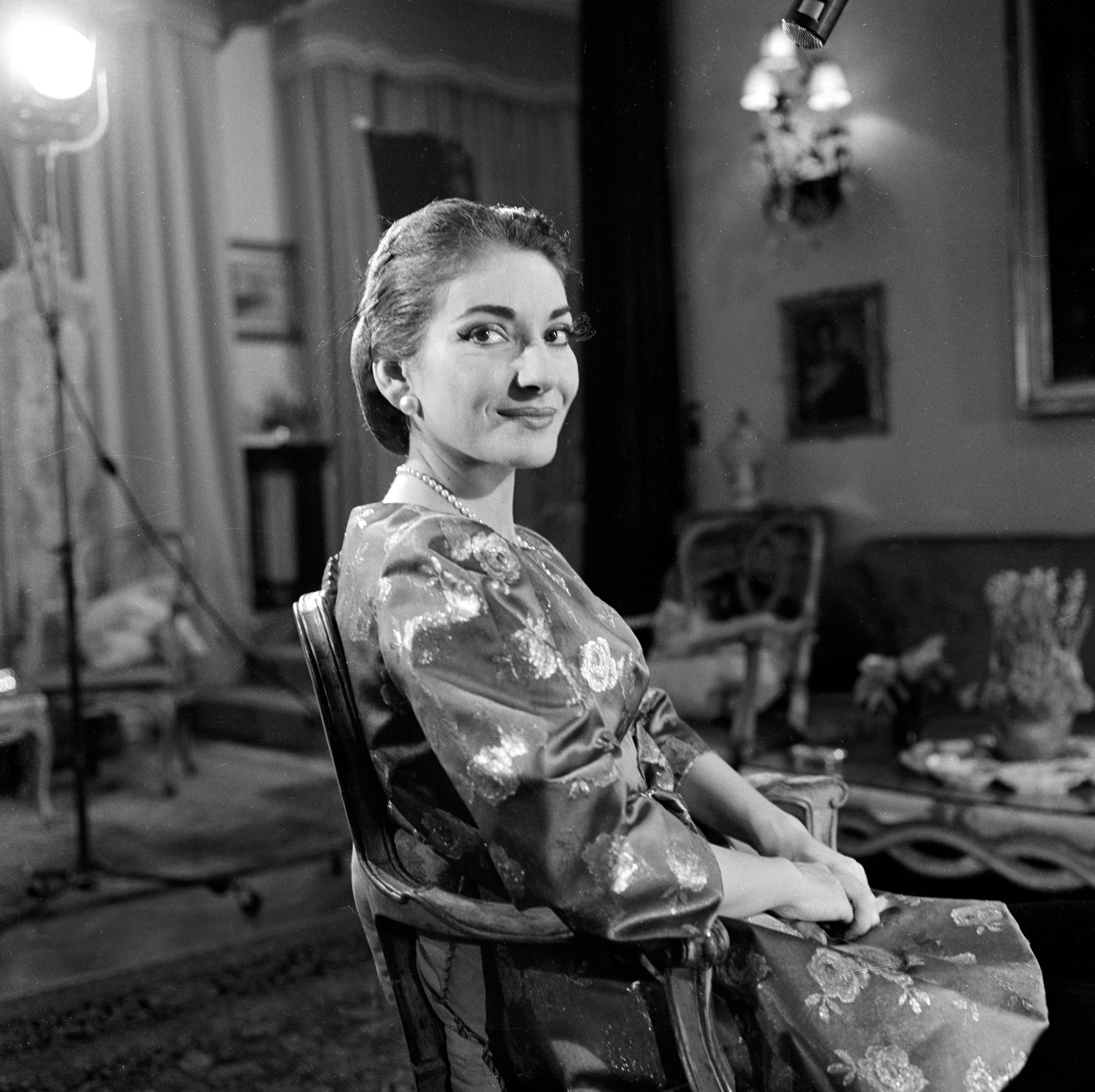
- Maria Callas in 1958
- Gender: Female

Origin
- Origin: Latin, Greek, Hebrew, Coptic
- Meaning: Several meanings: 1) "bitter", 2) "beloved", 3) "rebelliousness", 4) "wished-for child", 5) "marine", 6) "drop of the sea", 7) "famous"

Other names
- Variant forms: Mariah, Marie, Marija, Mariya
- Related names: Mary, Maryam, Miriam, Mari, Maya, Maris, Ma

Maria is a feminine given name. It is given in many languages influenced by Christianity.

It was the feminine form of the unrelated Roman name Marius (see Maria gens), and, after Christianity had spread across the Roman Empire, it became the Latinised form of the name of Miriam: Mary, mother of Jesus.

Maria (Greek: Μαρία) is a form of the name used in the New Testament, standing alongside Mariam (Μαριάμ). It reflects the Syro-Aramaic name Maryam, which is in turn derived from the Biblical Hebrew name Miriam. As a result of their similarity and syncretism, the Latin original name Maria and the Hebrew-derived Maria combined to form a single name.

In Germanic languages, the name's usage is connected with the Germanic element *mar*, meaning "famous".

The name is also sometimes used as a male (middle) name. This was historically the case in many Central Europe countries and still is the case in countries with strong Catholic traditions, where it signified patronage of the Virgin Mary (French-speakers often did the same with Marie).

In the Arabic language the name Mariam (مريم) (also written: Meryem, Mariya) means either "white beautiful woman" or "white cow" or "a little bird with the same size as a pigeon", and it is quite popular in North Africa. One of the feminine Sahaba had the name Maria, Maria the Coptic.

== Variants and usage ==
Maria was a frequently given name in southern Europe even in the medieval period. In addition to the simple name, there arose a tradition of naming girls after specific titles of Mary, feast days associated with Mary and specific Marian apparitions (such as María de los Dolores, María del Pilar, María del Carmen etc., whence the derived given names of Dolores, Pilar, Carmen etc.). By contrast, in northern Europe the name only rose to popularity after the Reformation.

Because the name is so frequent in Christian tradition, a tradition of giving compound names has developed, with a number of such compounds themselves becoming very popular. Examples, among numerous others, include:

- Anna + Maria (Anne-Marie, Marianne)
- Maria + Luisa (Marie-Louise)
- Maria + Antonia (Maria Antonia, French Marie-Antoinette)
- Maria + Helena (Italian Maria Elena, Spanish María Elena)
- Maria + Teresa (Maria Theresa, French Marie Thérèse)
- Maria + {Issa} Marissa or Marisa Christian Nazareth
- Maria + {Saiyra} Mary-Saiyra or Saiyra Mary Christian Antioch

As a feminine given name, Maria ranked 109th in the United States as of 2015, down from rank 31 held during 1973–1975. The English form Mary was at rank 214 as of 2015, after a much steeper decline down from being ranked first consistently during 1880–1968.

Spelling variants of Maria include: Mária (Hungarian, Slovak), María (Greek, Icelandic, Spanish), Máire and Muire (Irish), Marya (transliterated from Cyrillic), Marija (Latvian, but also used in other Balto-Slavic languages) and Maria (Polish). Due to a very strong devotion of Irish and Polish Catholics to the Blessed Virgin Mary, a special exception is made for two other forms of her name – Muire and Maryja: no one else may take that name, similar to the way the name Jesus is not used in most languages. The English form Mary is derived via French Marie.

A great number of hypocoristic forms are in use in numerous languages. Cyrillic Maryam and Miriam have numerous variants, such as

- Mariami (Georgian)
- Mariamma, biblical Mariamme, Mariamne
- Məryəm (Azerbaijani)
- Meryem (Kurdish, Turkish)
- Myriam (French)

The spelling in Semitic abjads is mrym: Aramaic ܡܪܝܡ, Hebrew מרים, Arabic مريم.

Cyrillic spellings are Мария (Maríja) (Russian, Bulgarian), Марыя (Marýja) (Belarusian), Марія (Maríja) (Ukrainian) and Марија (Marija) (Serbian, Macedonian).

Georgian uses მარიამ (Mariam) and მარია (Maria); Armenian has Մարիամ (Mariam).

Chinese has adopted the spelling 瑪麗 (simplified 玛丽, pinyin Mǎlì).

The variant Mariah (usually pronounced /məˈraɪə/) was rarely given in the United States prior to the 1990s, when it bounced in popularity, from rank 562 in 1989 to rank 62 in 1998, in imitation of the name of singer Mariah Carey (whose Vision of Love topped the charts in 1990).

== People named Maria ==
=== Royalty ===
- Maria I of Portugal (1734–1816), Queen of Portugal
- Maria II of Portugal (1818–1853), Queen of Portugal
- María de la Cerda (1319–1375), countess of Étampes
- Maria Brignole Sale De Ferrari (1811–1888), Italian duchess
- Maria Vittoria dal Pozzo (1847–1876), queen consort of Spain (1870–1873)
- María de la Consolación Azlor (1775–1814), the countess of Bureta
- Maria Margarida de Lorena, 2nd Duchess of Abrantes (1713–1780)
- Maria de' Medici (1575–1642), Queen of France
- Maria Cristina de' Medici (1609–1632), Italian princess
- Maria Maddalena de' Medici (1600–1633), Tuscan Royal
- Maria Letizia Bonaparte, Duchess of Aosta (1866–1926)
- Maria Buynosova-Rostovskaya (died 1626), Tsaritsa of all Russia
- Maria Maddalena Capece Galeota, duchess of Regina
- Maria Angela Caterina d'Este (1656–1722), Princess of Carignano
- Maria Caterina Farnese (1615–1646), Duchess of Moderna and Reggio
- Maria Feodorovna (Sophie Dorothea of Württemberg) (1796–1801)
- Maria Francisca, Duchess of Coimbra (born 1997)
- Maria Haraldsdotter (1045–1066), Norwegian princess
- Maria Laskarina (c. 1206–1270), Queen consort of Hungary
- Maria Nagaya (1553–1608), Russian tsaritsa
- Maria Nikolaevna (1899–1918), Grand Duchess of Russia
- Maria Pavlovna, Grand Duchess of Saxe-Weimar-Eisenach (1786–1859)
- María Josefa Pimentel, Duchess of Osuna (1752–1834), Spanish Salonnière
- María de Jesús de Iturbide (1818–1849), Mexican princess
- Maria Sanudo (died 1426), lady of the island of Andros in the Duchy of the Archipelago
- Maria Skuratova-Belskaya (1552–1605), Tsaritsa of Russia
- Maria Clementina Sobieska (1702–1735), consort of the Jacobite pretender
- Maria Karolina Sobieska (1697–1740), Duchess of Bouillon
- Maria Temryukovna, Tsaritsa of Russia (1561–1569)
- Maria Tescanu Rosetti (1879–1968), Romanian princess
- Maria Voichița (1457–1511), Moldovan princess
- Maria Walpole (1736–1807), Duchess of Gloucester and Edinburgh
- Maria Wirtemberska (1768–1854), Duchess Louis of Württenberg
- Maria Zaccaria, princess of Achaea

==== Servants and mistresses of Royalty ====
- Maria Gustavna Tutelberg, maid in the Russian Imperial Household
- Maria Fitzherbert (1756–1837), Royal mistress
- Maria Antonia Branconi (1746–1793), German royal mistress

=== Nobility ===
- Maria Theresia Ahlefeldt (1755–1810), German-born aristocrat and Danish composer
- Maria Beccadelli di Bologna (1848–1929), Italian aristocrat
- Maria Helena de Albuquerque, 1st Baroness of Oliveira Lima, Portuguese noble
- Maria de Cardona (1509–1563), Italian noblewoman
- Maria Cantemir (1700–1754), Russian noblewoman
- Maria Cederschiöld (1815–1892), Swedish noble deaconess and nurse
- Maria Choglokova (1723–1756), Russian lady-in-waiting and noble
- Maria Zofia Czartoryska (1699–1771), Polish noblewoman
- Maria de Ergadia (died 1302), Scottish noblewoman
- Maria Josepha Hermengilde Esterházy (1768–1845), German noblewoman
- Maria Golitzyna (1834–1910), Russian noble, courtier and philanthropist
- María de Salinas (1490–1539), Spanish noblewoman
- Maria Sofia De la Gardie (1627–1694), Swedish noble and industrialist
- María Ramírez de Medrano, 12th century noblewoman of León and Castile
- María de Toledo (1490–1549), Spanish noblewoman
- Maria Fadrique, Lady of the Lordship of Salona (1382–1394)
- Maria Gonzaga, Duchess of Montferrat (1609–1660), regent of Mantua
- Maria Howard, Duchess of Norfolk, English Catholic noblewoman
- Maria Klara of Dietrichstein, German noblewoman
- Maria Ivanovna Khlopova (died 1633), Russian noble
- Maria Ludwika Krasińska (1883–1958), Polish noblewoman
- Maria Lanckorońska (1737–1826), Polish noblewoman
- Maria Menshikova (1711–1729), Russian noble
- Maria Meshcherskaya (1844–1868), Russian lady-in-waiting
- Maria Molyneux, Countess of Sefton (1769–1851), British noblewoman
- Maria Naryshkina (1779–1854), Polish noblewoman
- Maria Nesselrode (1786–1849), courtier of the Russian Imperial Court
- Maria Nirod (1879–1965), Russian countess and nurse
- Maria Razumovskaya (1772–1868), Russian noblewoman
- Maria Salviati (1499–1543), Florentine noblewoman
- Maria Seymour-Conway, Marchioness of Hertford (1771–1856), London society hostess
- Maria Skobtsova (1891–1945), Russian noblewoman and resistance fighter
- Maria Skytte (died 1703), Swedish noble
- Maria Chiara Spinucci (1741–1792), Italian aristocrat
- Maria Stanley, Baroness Stanley of Alderley (1771–1863), British letter writer and liberal advocate
- Maria Arkadyevna Stolypina, Russian courtier
- Maria van Beckum (died 1544), Dutch noblewoman and Anabaptist burned at the skate for heresy
- Maria Van den Bergh, Dutch noblewoman
- Maria von Maltzan (1909–1997), German resistance member and aristocrat
- Maria Follia (died 1358), Hungarian noblewoman
- Maria Rumyantseva (1699–1788), Russian lady-in-waiting

=== Politicians ===
- Maria Ângela Carrascalão, East Timorese politician
- Maria Fernanda Lay, East Timorese politician
- Maria Aasen-Svensrud, Norwegian politician
- María Laura Leguizamón (born 1965), Argentine politician
- Maria Abrahamsson (born 1963), Swedish lawyer, journalist and politician
- Maria Fe Abunda (born 1957), Filipino politician
- María Urciel Castañeda (born 1959), Mexican politician
- Maria Caraher (born 1968), politician from Northern Ireland
- Maria Carrilho (1943–2022), Portuguese politician
- María Caviglia (1895–1985), Argentine politician
- María Corona Nakamura (born 1964), Mexican politician
- Maria Chiara Acciarini (born 1943), Italian politician
- Maria Chin Abdullah, Malaysian politician
- Maria Cervania, American politician from North Carolina
- María Alanoca (born 1960), Bolivian politician
- Maria Soave Alemanno (born 1972), Italian politician
- María Julia Alsogaray (1942–2017), Argentine politician and civil servant
- María Antonieta Alva (born 1985), Peruvian politician
- Maria Ansorge (1880–1955), German politician
- Maria-Ivanna Hrushevska (1868–1948), spouse of Ukrainian political leader Mykhailo Hrushevsky
- María Elvia Amaya Araujo (1954–2012), Mexican politician
- Maria Arbatova (born 1957), Russian and Soviet writer, politician and feminist
- Maria Rachel Arenas (born 1971), chairperson of the Movie and Television Review and Classification Board and politician
- María Argüelles Arellano (born 1963), Mexican politician
- Maria Arnholm (born 1958), Swedish politician
- Maria Koszutska (1876–1939), Polish communist leader and theoretician
- María Teodora Arrieta (born 1955), Mexican politician
- Maria Arruvaia, Mozambican politician
- María Gatica Gajardo, Chilean politician
- Maria Augimeri, Canadian politician
- María Fernanda Astudillo, Ecuadorian politician
- Maria Corrigan, Irish politician
- María Angélica Cristi (born 1941), Chilean politician
- Maria Crowby (died 2020), Ni-Vanuatu politician
- María Ávila Serna (born 1973), Mexican politician and lawyer
- Maria Backenecker (1893–1931), German politician
- Maria Badia i Cutchet (born 1947), Spanish politician
- Maria Leavey (1954–2006), American political consultant
- Maria Baers (1893–1959), Belgian politician and feminist
- Maria Baez, American politician
- Maria Bailey (born 1975), Irish politician
- Maria Baldó i Massanet (1884–1964), Spanish teacher, feminist, folklorist and liberal politician
- María Balta (born 1955), Peruvian politician
- Maria Barrados, Canadian government official
- Maria Victoria Barros (born 1992), Brazilian politician
- Maria Barroso (1925–2015), Portuguese politician
- Maria Begonha (born 1989), Portuguese politician
- Maria Belo (born 1938), Portuguese psychoanalyst and former Member of the European Parliament
- Maria Berger (born 1956), Austrian politician
- Maria Berny (1932–2021), Polish politician
- Maria Antonia Berrios (born 1977), American politician
- Maria Bertolini (1931–2022), Italian politician
- María Eugenia Bielsa (born 1958), Argentine politician
- Maria Bird-Browne (born 1991), Member of the Parliament of Antigua and Barbuda
- Maria Blum (1890–1965), German politician and journalist
- Maria Böhmer (born 1950), German politician
- Maria Bohuszewiczówna (1865–1887), Polish revolutionary
- María Bolívar (born 1975), Venezuelan politician
- Maria Bolshakova, Russian politician
- Maria Antonieta de Brito (born 1969), Brazilian politician
- Maria Camilleri (born 1952), Maltese politician
- Maria Cammarata, Italian politician
- María Cristina Brítez, Argentine politician and lawyer
- Maria do Céu Monteiro, president of the Supreme Court of Guinea-Bissau
- Maria do Céu Sarmento, East Timorese politician
- Maria De Unterrichter Jervolino, Italian politician
- Maria Deguara (born 1949), Maltese politician
- Maria Deku (1901–1983), German politician
- María Victoria Brusquetti, Paraguayan activist and politician
- Maria Pilar Busquets (1937–2016), Spanish Aranese politician and writer
- Maria Byrne (born 1967), Irish politician
- María Fernanda Cabal (born 1964), Colombian politician
- María Cabrera Muñoz (born 1952), Mexican politician
- María Fernanda Campo Saavedra, Colombian politician
- María Eugenia Campos Galván (born 1975), Mexican politician
- Maria Cantwell (born 1958), American Senator
- Maria Cardona (born 1966), American-Colombian consultant and political strategist
- María Eugenia Casar, UN official
- Maria Donatucci, American politician
- Maria Downey (1836–1883), First Lady of California (1860–62)
- Maria Drobot, Russian politician
- María René Duchén (born 1965), Bolivian journalist, TV presenter and politician
- Maria Domenica Castellone, Italian politician
- María Eugenia Duré, Argentine politician
- Maria Durhuus (born 1977), Danish politician
- Maria Caulfield (born 1973), British politician
- Maria Cavaco Silva (born 1938), First Lady of Portugal
- María Ceseñas Chapa (born 1952), Mexican politician
- Maria Chappelle-Nadal (born 1974), American politician
- Maria Chaput (born 1942), Canadian politician
- María Milagros Charbonier (born 1963), Puerto Rican politician
- María Izaguirre (1891–1979), Mexican politician
- María Izaguirre Francos (born 1952), Mexican politician
- María Gabriela Chávez, Venezuelan diplomat, daughter of president Hugo Chávez
- María Eugenia Catalfamo (born 1987), Argentine politician
- Maria Cimini (born 1976), American politician
- Maria Lisa Cinciari Rodano (1921–2023), Italian politician
- Maria Cino (born 1957), American civil servant and politician
- Maria Collett (born 1974), American politician
- Maria Chiara Carrozza (born 1965), Italian engineer and politician
- Maria Zeneida Collinson, Filipina ambassador
- María Colón Sánchez (1926–1989), Puerto Rican politician
- Maria Contreras-Sweet (born 1955), American politician
- Maria Damanaki (born 1952), Greek politician
- Maria Dantas (born 1969), Brazilian-Spanish activist and politician
- Maria Angela Danzì (born 1957), Italian politician
- María Jaspeado (born 1967), Mexican politician
- María Leticia Jasso (born 1948), Mexican politician
- Maria das Neves, Santomese politician and first female prime minister
- María Alicia de la Rosa López (born 1963), Mexican politician
- María Estela de la Fuente (born 1966), Mexican politician
- María de las Nieves García (born 1955), Mexican politician
- Maria Desylla-Kapodistria (1898–1980), Greek politician
- Maria Deutsch (1882–1969), Czechoslovak politician
- Maria Dietz (1894–1980), German politician
- Maria do Carmo Seabra (born 1955), Portuguese politician
- Maria do Céu Antunes (born 1970), Portuguese politician
- Maria Dziuba (born 1945), Polish politician
- Maria Eagle (born 1961), British Labour politician
- Maria Echaveste (born 1954), White House Deputy Chief of Staff
- Maria Eckertz (1899–1969), German activist and politician
- María Fernanda Espinosa (born 1964), Ecuadorian politician
- Maria Emhart (1901–1981), Austrian resistance activist and politician
- Maria Angelina Dique Enoque (born 1953), Mozambican politician
- María Ester Feres (1943–2021), Chilean politician
- Maria Edileuza Fontenele Reis (born 1954), Brazilian ambassador
- Maria Eichhorn (born 1948), German politician
- Maria Aida Episcopo (born 1963), Italian politician
- Maria Fekter (born 1956), Austrian politician
- Maria Fitzpatrick (born 1949), Canadian politician
- Maria Fatima, Pakistani politician
- Maria Flachsbarth (born 1963), German politician
- Maria Forsberg (born 1974), Swedish politician
- Maria Engracia Freyer (1888–1969), American First Lady of Guam
- María Sanjuana Cerda Franco (born 1951), Mexican politician
- Maria Fyfe (1938–2020), Scottish politician
- Maria Gaidar (born 1982), Ukrainian politician
- Maria Gardfjell (born 1965), Swedish politician
- María Esther Garza Moreno (born 1948), Mexican politician
- Maria Grapini (born 1954), Romanian politician
- Maria Gabriela Fonseca, Portuguese politician
- Maria Gates-Meltel, Palauan politician and civil servant
- María Pariente Gavito (born 1955), Mexican politician
- Maria Giannakaki (born 1969), Greek politician
- Maria Reumert Gjerding (born 1976), Danish politician
- Maria Gordon (1864–1939), Scottish geologist, paleontologist and politician
- Maria Cecilia Guerra (born 1957), Italian politician and economist
- María Paula Acevedo Guzmán (1932–2021), Dominican activist and First Lady of the Dominican Republic
- María Guzmán Lozano (born 1961), Mexican politician
- Maria Hadden (born 1981), American politician
- Maria Haller (1923–2006), Angolan diplomat, journalist, teacher and writer
- María Ángela Holguín (born 1963), Colombian politician and diplomat
- Maria Horn, American attorney and politician
- María Hurtado de Gómez, First Lady of Colombia (1950–1953)
- Maria de Fátima Monteiro Jardim, Angolan politician
- Maria Kurnatowska (1945–2009), Polish politician
- Maria Kurowska (born 1954), Polish politician
- María Esther Jiménez Ramos (born 1963), Mexican politician
- María Eugenia Jiménez Valenzuela (born 1940), Mexican politician
- Maria Hassan (born 1952), Swedish politician
- Maria Heather (died 2003), New Zealand politician
- María Talavera Hernández (born 1964), Mexican politician
- Maria Heubuch (born 1958), German politician
- María de Jesús Huerta (born 1951), Mexican politician
- Maria Humeniuk (born 1948), Ukrainian politician and writer
- Maria Ilnicka-Mądry (1946–2023), Polish politician
- Maria Ibeshi Hewa (born 1950), Tanzanian politician
- Maria Janyska, Polish economist and politician
- Maria Jufereva-Skuratovski (born 1979), Estonian politician
- Maria Beckley Kahea (1847–1909), Hawaiian chiefess
- Maria Kaczyńska (1942–2010), First Lady of Poland
- Maria Kalaw Katigbak (1912–1992), Filipino politician and former beauty queen
- Maria Kamm (born 1937), Tanzanian educator, politician and philanthropist
- Maria Karapetyan, Armenian politician
- Maria Kharchenko (born 1991), Russian politician
- Maria Kiwanuka (born 1955), Ugandan economist, businesswoman and politician
- Maria Semyonovna Kikh (1914–1979), Ukrainian Soviet politician
- Maria Klein-Schmeink (born 1958), German politician
- Mária Kolíková (born 1974), Slovak politician
- Maria Kollia-Tsaroucha, Greek politician
- Maria Kornevik-Jakobsson (born 1953), Swedish politician
- Maria Koc, Polish politician
- Maria Kovacic, Australian politician
- María Cristina Kronfle (born 1985), Ecuadorian lawyer and politician
- María Josefa Lastiri (1792–1846), First Lady of the Federal Republic of Central America
- Maria Laice, Mozambican politician
- Maria Carmela Lanzetta (born 1955), Italian politician
- Maria Aracely Leiva (born 1967), Honduran politician
- Maria Alzira Lemos (1919–2005), Portuguese feminist and parliamentary deputy
- Maria Letonmäki (1882–1937), Finnish politician
- Maria Benvinda Levy (born 1969), Mozambican politician and former judge
- Maria Angelina Lopes Sarmento (born 1978), East Timorese politician
- Maria Lopes, American politician and activist
- Maria Lohela (born 1978), Finnish politician
- Maria Rita Lorenzetti (born 1953), Italian politician
- María Libertad Gómez Garriga (1889–1961), Puerto Rican educator and politician
- Maria Limardo (born 1960), Italian politician
- María Lucero Saldaña (born 1957), Mexican politician
- Maria Lundqvist-Brömster, Swedish politician
- Maria Lvova-Belova (born 1984), Russian politician
- Maria Malmer Stenergard (born 1981), Swedish politician
- Maria Matsouka (born 1974), Greek politician
- Maria Martens (born 1955), Dutch politician
- Maria Cristina Messa (born 1961), Italian doctor, academic and politician
- María Ofelia Navarrete, Salvadoran politician
- María Angélica Magaña Zepeda (born 1975), Mexican politician
- Maria Magnani Noya (1931–2011), Italian politician
- María de Jesús Aguirre Maldonado (born 1961), Mexican lawyer and politician
- Maria Mambo Café (1945–2013), Angolan economist and politician
- María Marcano de León, Puerto Rican government official
- María Martorell (born 1942), Spanish politician
- María Meléndez (born 1951), Puerto Rican politician
- María Emma Mejía Vélez (born 1953), Colombian politician and journalist
- María Mendoza Sánchez (born 1970), Mexican politician
- María Leticia Mendoza Curiel (born 1956), Mexican politician
- Maria Antonietta Macciocchi (1922–2007), Italian politician and journalist
- Maria Rosaria Manieri (born 1943), Italian academic and socialist politician
- Maria Mezentseva (born 1989), Ukrainian politician
- Maria Vittoria Mezza (1926–2005), Italian politician
- Maria Michalk (born 1949), German politician
- Maria Domenica Michelotti (born 1952), Sammarinese politician
- María Michelsen de López, First Lady of Colombia (1934–1938, 1942–1945)
- Maria Miller (born 1964), British politician
- María Juan Millet (born 1953), Spanish politician
- Maria Milczarek (1929–2011), Polish politician
- Maria Minna (born 1948), Canadian politician
- María Guadalupe Moctezuma (born 1983), Mexican politician
- Maria Goia (1878–1924), Italian politician, feminist and trade unionist
- María Caro Más, Cuban politician
- Maria Moczydłowska (1886–1969), Polish educator and politician
- María Esperanza Morelos Borja (born 1953), Mexican politician
- Maria Fida Moro (1946–2024), Italian politician
- María Guadalupe Mondragón (born 1958), Mexican politician
- María Jesús Montero (born 1966), Spanish politician
- María Muñiz de Urquiza (born 1962), Spanish politician
- Maria Mourani (born 1969), Canadian politician
- Maria Mutagamba (1952–2017), Ugandan politician and economist
- Maria Nasu (born 1956), member of the Moldovan Parliament
- Maria Nedina, Bulgarian politician
- Maria Alda Nogueira (1923–1998), Portuguese communist, feminist, anti-fascist activist and politician
- María Nsué Angüe (1945–2017), Equatoguinean writer and politician
- Maria Nicotra (1913–2007), Italian politician
- Maria Niggemeyer (1888–1968), German politician
- Maria Nikiforova (1885–1919), Ukrainian anarchist partisan
- Maria Nilsson (born 1979), Swedish politician
- María Beatriz Nofal (born 1952), Argentine economist and civil servant
- Maria Alexandra Nogueira Vieira (born 1966), Portuguese teacher and politician
- Maria Noichl (born 1967), German politician
- Maria Ntuli (born 1953), South African politician
- Maria Nyerere (born 1930), First Lady of Tanzania
- María Inés Obaldía (born 1959), Uruguayan television presenter, educator, producer, journalist and politician
- María Oltra (born 1963), Spanish politician
- Maria Osberg (1864–1940), Swedish politician and trade unionist
- Maria Otero (born 1950), Bolivian-American diplomat
- Maria Paaso-Laine (1868–1945), Finnish politician
- María Báez Padilla (born 1973), Mexican politician
- Maria Pańczyk-Pozdziej (1942–2022), Polish journalist, teacher and politician
- Maria Pallini (born 1984), Italian politician
- Maria Frica Pangelinan (born 1948), Northern Mariana Islander politician
- María Graciela Parola, Argentine politician
- María Parra Becerra (born 1967), Mexican politician
- Maria Pasło-Wiśniewska (born 1959), Polish politician
- María Perceval (born 1956), Argentine politician
- Maria Leissner (born 1956), Swedish politician
- Maria Manuel Leitão Marques (born 1952), Portuguese politician
- Maria Lea Pedini-Angelini (born 1954), Captain Regent of San Marino
- Maria Larsson (politician) (born 1956), Swedish politician
- María Pellicer (1950–2022), Spanish politician
- Maria Perveeva, Russian teacher and politician
- Maria Petre (born 1951), Romanian politician and economist
- María Inés Pilatti Vergara (born 1958), Argentine politician
- Maria Piłsudska (1865–1921), First Lady of Poland
- María Elva Pinckert (born 1961), Bolivian politician
- María Pineda Gochi (born 1955), Mexican politician
- Maria Plass (born 1953), Swedish politician
- María Elvira Pombo Holguín (born 1960), Colombian diplomat
- Maria Postoico (1950–2019), Moldovan politician
- Mária Pozsonec (1940–2017), Slovenian politician
- María Nela Prada (born 1981), Bolivian politician
- Maria Probst (1902–1967), German politician
- Maria Prusakova (born 1983), Russian communist politician
- Maria Quiñones-Sánchez (born 1968), American politician
- María Elisa Quinteros (born 1981), president of the Chilean Constitutional Convention
- Maria Quisling (1900–1980), Norwegian politician
- Maria Qvist (1879–1958), Swedish politician
- Maria Rabaté (1900–1985), French legislator and politician
- Maria Rafael, Mozambican politician
- Maria de Belém Roseira (born 1949), Portuguese politician
- María Ramírez Diez (born 1961), Mexican politician
- María Angélica Ramírez Luna (born 1975), Mexican politician
- María Angels Ramón-Llin (born 1963), Spanish politician
- Maria Rantho (1953–2002), South African politician
- Maria Rauch-Kallat (born 1949), Austrian politician
- Maria Raunio (1872–1911), Finnish educator and politician
- María Regla Prío (1909–2005), Cuban politician
- María Teresa Rejas (born 1946), Spanish politician
- Maria Dolors Renau (1936–2019), Spanish politician
- María Reynoso Femat (born 1963), Mexican politician
- Maria Pilar Riba Font (born 1944), Andorran politician
- Maria Rizzotti (born 1953), Italian politician
- Maria Robinson (born 1987), Korean-American politician
- Maria Robsahm (born 1957), Swedish politician
- Maria Mercè Roca (born 1958), Spanish writer and politician
- María Rojo (born 1943), Mexican actress and politician
- Maria Fernanda Rollo (born 1965), Portuguese history professor and former government minister
- María Guadalupe Romero Castillo, Mexican politician
- María Fernanda Romero Lozano (born 1986), Mexican politician
- María Paula Romo (born 1979), Ecuadorian politician
- Maria da Luz Rosinha (born 1948), Portuguese politician
- Maria Rita Rossa (born 1966), Italian politician and mayor
- María Eugenia Roselló (born 1981), Uruguayan politician
- Maria Maddalena Rossi (1906–1995), Italian politician
- Maria Veronica Rossi (born 1988), Italian politician
- Maria Roth-Bernasconi (born 1955), Swiss politician
- Maria Saadeh (born 1974), Syrian architect, politician and developer
- Maria Assunta Accili Sabbatini (born 1955), Italian diplomat
- Mária Sabolová (born 1956), Slovak politician
- Maria Sachs (born 1949), American politician
- María Elyd Sáenz, Mexican politician
- María Isabel Salinas (born 1966), Spanish politician
- María San Gil (born 1965), Spanish politician
- María Cristina Sangri Aguilar (1941–2022), Mexican politician
- Maria Ulfah Santoso (1911–1988), Indonesian politician and activist
- María Isabel Salvador (born 1962), Ecuadorian diplomat
- Maria Savchenko (1913–2005), Soviet agrarian and politician
- María Fernanda Schroeder (born 1958), Mexican politician
- Maria Helena Semedo (born 1959), Cape Verde economist and politician
- Maria Serenius (born 2008), Finnish diplomat
- María Serrano Serrano (born 1957), Mexican politician
- Maria Elizabeth Simbrão de Carvalho, Angolan ambassador
- Mária Šofranko (born 1970), Slovak educator and politician
- Maria Sorolis, American politician
- María Sotolano, Argentine politician
- Maria Sowina, Polish politician
- Maria Edera Spadoni (born 1979), Italian politician
- Maria Francesca Spatolisano, Italian diplomat
- María Arias Staines (1941–2023), Mexican politician
- Maria Steen, Irish conservative campaigner
- Maria Stenberg (born 1966), Swedish politician
- Maria Stockhaus (born 1963), Swedish politician
- María Laura Stratta (born 1976), Argentine politician
- Maria Strömkvist (born 1964), Swedish politician
- Maria Syms (born 1968), American politician
- Maria Szyszkowska (born 1937), Polish politician
- Maria Helena Taipo (born 1961), Mozambican politician
- Maria Talal, Pakistani politician
- Maria Tam (born 1945), Hong Kong politician
- Maria Tebús (born 1958), São Toméan politician
- Maria de Jesus Trovoada (born 1961), São Toméan biologist and politician
- Maria Ubach i Font (born 1973), Andorran diplomat and politician
- María Udaeta (born 1964), Bolivian politician
- María Urbelina Tejada (1922–2015), Argentine politician
- María Esther Terán Velázquez (born 1952), Mexican politician
- Maria Theofili, Greek diplomat and ministerial official
- Maria Virginia Tiraboschi (born 1965), Italian politician
- Maria Tolppanen (born 1952), Finnish politician
- María Torre Canales (born 1974), Mexican politician
- Maria Torres-Springer (born 1977), American government official and nonprofit executive
- María Antonia Trujillo (born 1960), Spanish politician
- Maria Tusch (1868–1939), Austrian politician
- María Lavalle Urbina (1908–1996), first female president of the Mexican Senate
- María Yolanda Valencia Vales (born 1961), Mexican politician
- Maria Vamvakinou (born 1959), Australian politician
- Maria Van Bommel, Canadian politician
- Maria van der Hoeven (born 1949), Dutch politician
- Maria Vasilevich (born 1997), Belarusian model and politician
- Maria Vasilkova (born 1978), Russian politician
- Maria Vassilakou (born 1969), Austrian politician
- María Oralia Vega Ortiz (born 1963), Mexican politician
- María Vega Pagán (born 1977), Puerto Rican politician
- María Araceli Vázquez Camacho (born 1948), Mexican politician
- María Guadalupe Velázquez Díaz (born 1985), Mexican politician
- Maria Veitola (born 1973), Finnish politician
- María Eugenia Vidal (born 1973), Argentine politician
- María Cristina Vilanova (1915–2009), First Lady of Guatemala
- Maria Vindevoghel (born 1957), Belgian politician
- Maria Walter (1895–1988), German politician
- Maria Wasiak (born 1960), Polish businessman and politician
- Maria Weiterer (1899–1976), German politician
- Maria Wetterstrand (born 1973), Swedish politician
- Mária Wittner (1937–2022), Hungarian revolutionary and politician
- Maria Wodzicka (1901–1968), New Zealand welfare worker and community leader
- Maria Wojciechowska (1869–1959), First Lady of Poland
- María Begoña Yarza (born 1964), Chilean politician
- Maria Zacharia, Greek politician
- María Zamudio Guzmán (born 1961), Mexican politician
- Maria Zakharova (born 1975), Russian foreign ministry spokesperson
- María Zavala Valladares (born 1956), Peruvian politician, lawyer and judge
- Maria Zazzi (1904–1993), Italian anarchist
- Maria Zbyrowska, Polish politician
- Maria Zuba (born 1951), Polish politician
- María Esther Zuno (1924–1999), First Lady of Mexico

=== Sportspeople ===
==== Basketball players ====
- Maria Angélica, Brazilian basketball player
- María Araújo (born 1997), Spanish basketball player
- María Asurmendi (born 1986), Spanish basketball player
- María Moret (born 1961), Cuban basketball player
- Maria Roza Boni (born 1986), Greek professional basketball player
- María Itatí Castaldi (born 1988), Argentine Paralympic basketball player
- María Conde (born 1997), Spanish basketball player
- Maria Cristina Correnti (born 1972), Italian former basketball player
- Maria Gakdeng (born 2003), American basketball player
- Maria Kalmykova (born 1978), Russian basketball player
- Maria Kühn (born 1982), German wheelchair basketball player
- María Pilar Alonso (born 1968), Spanish basketball player
- María Pina (born 1987), Spanish basketball player
- Maria Najjuma (born 2003), Ugandan basketball player
- María de los Santos (born 1959), Cuban basketball player
- María Lind Sigurðardóttir (born 1989), Icelandic basketball player
- Maria Samoroukova (born 1971), Greek basketball player
- Maria Stepanova (born 1979), Russian basketball player
- María Revuelto (born 1982), Spanish basketball player
- Maria Vadeeva (born 1998), Russian basketball player
- Maria Villarroel (born 1978), Venezuelan basketball player

==== Canoeists ====
- Maria Cosma, Romanian sprint canoeist
- María Corbera (born 1991), Spanish sprint canoeist
- María Eizmendi (born 1972), Spanish canoeist
- Maria Francis, British canoeist
- Maria Clara Giai Pron (born 1992), Italian canoeist
- Maria Haglund (born 1972), Swedish canoeist
- Maria van der Holst-Blijlevens (born 1946), Dutch canoeist
- Maria Ivanov, Romanian canoeist
- Maria Kazanecka (born 1955), Polish canoeist
- María Mailliard (born 1991), Chilean canoeist
- María Miliauro (born 1968), Argentine canoeist
- Maria Mintscheva (born 1952), Bulgarian canoeist
- Maria Nichiforov (1951–2022), Romanian canoeist
- Maria Nicolae, Romanian canoeist
- Maria Olărașu (born 2000), Moldovan sprint canoeist
- Maria Roka (1940–2021), Hungarian canoeist
- Maria Szkeli (born 1941), Romanian canoeist
- Mária Zakariás (born 1952), Hungarian canoeist

==== Chess players ====
- Maria Ager, Austrian chess player
- Maria Albuleț (1932–2005), Romanian chess player
- María Berea de Montero (1914–1983), Argentine chess player
- Maria Emelianova (born 1987), Russian-English chess player
- Maria Efimenko (born 1996), Ukrainian chess player
- Maria Eizaguerri Floris, Spanish chess player
- Maria Fominykh (born 1987), Russian chess player
- Maria Gevorgyan (born 1994), Armenian chess player
- Mária Grosch, Hungarian chess player
- Maria Horvath (born 1963), Austrian chess player
- Maria Kouvatsou (born 1979), Greek chess player
- Maria Leconte, French chess player
- Maria Manakova (born 1974), Serbian chess player
- María Teresa Mora (1902–1980), Cuban chess player
- Maria Mickiewicz, Polish chess player
- Maria Cristina de Oliveira (born 1959), Brazilian chess player
- Maria Petraki, Greek chess player
- Mária Porubszky-Angyalosine (born 1945), Hungarian chess player
- Maria Scheffold, German chess player
- Maria Severina (born 1995), Russian chess player
- Maria Sukhareva (born 1952), Russian chess player
- Maria Lucia Ratna Sulistya (born 1975), Indonesian chess player
- Maria Velcheva (born 1976), Bulgarian chess player
- Maria Idalia Zapata, Colombian chess player

==== Cyclists ====
- Maria Averina (born 1993), Russian track cyclist
- Maria Blower (born 1964), English cyclist
- María Briceño (born 1985), Venezuelan cyclist
- Maria Cagigas (born 1979), Spanish cyclist
- María Calderón Fernandez (born 1997), Spanish cyclist
- María Luisa Calle (born 1968), Colombian racing cyclist
- Maria Canins (born 1949), Italian racing cyclist
- Maria Aldana Cetra (born 1980), Argentine cyclist
- Maria Giulia Confalonieri (born 1993), Italian cyclist
- María del Carmen Chaves Calvo (born 1967), Spanish cyclist
- Maria Hawkins (born 1962), Canadian cyclist
- Maria Heim (born 1966), Swiss cyclist
- Maria Herrijgers (born 1955), Belgian cyclist
- Maria Jongeling (born 1975), Dutch racing cyclist
- Maria Kantsyber (born 1996), Russian cyclist
- Maria Lawrence (born 1970), English cyclist
- Maria Novolodskaya (born 1999), Russian cyclist
- Maria Östergren (born 1978), Swedish cyclist
- Maria Parker (born 1963), American cyclist
- Maria Savitskaya (born 1991), Russian cyclist
- Maria Vittoria Sperotto (born 1996), Italian cyclist
- Maria Paola Turcutto (born 1965), Italian cyclist

==== Footballers ====
- Maria-Laura Aga (born 1994), Belgian footballer
- María Alharilla (born 1990), Spanish footballer
- Maria Almasri (born 2004), Israeli footballer
- Maria Anderton (born 1969), Kiwi association footballer
- Maria Aronsson (born 1983), Swedish former footballer
- María Paz Azagra (born 1982), Spanish footballer
- Maria Azzopardi (born 1983), Maltese footballer
- María Barrantes (born 1989), Costa Rican footballer
- Maria Baska (born 2000), Albanian footballer
- Maria Bergkvist (born 1977), Swedish football coach and former player
- Maria Bertelli (born 1977), British footballer and volleyball player
- María Björg Ágústsdóttir (born 1982), Icelandic footballer
- María Bores (born 1997), Spanish footballer
- Maria Brochmann (born 1993), Norwegian footballer
- Maria Buzunova (born 1982), Belarusian footballer
- María Carvajal (born 1983), Chilean football referee
- María Cáceres (born 1996), Peruvian footballer
- María de Jesús Castillo (born 1983), Mexican footballer
- María Guadalupe Cruzaley (born 1986), Mexican footballer
- María Contreras (born 1998), Guatemalan footballer
- María Coto (born 1998), Costa Rican footballer
- Maria Dyatchkova (born 1982), Russian football defender
- Maria Edwards (born 2003), English footballer
- María Estella, Spanish footballer
- María Paula Elizondo (born 1998), Costa Rican footballer
- Maria Farrugia (born 2001), Maltese footballer
- Maria Ficzay (born 1991), Romanian women's football defender
- Maria Filatova (born 1980), Estonian footballer
- Maria Galay (born 1992), Russian footballer
- Maria George (born 1965), New Zealand footballer
- María Guevara (born 2000), Panamanian footballer
- Maria Gstöttner (born 1984), Austrian footballer
- Maria Harper, English footballer
- Maria Ioannou (born 1991), Cypriot footballer
- María Cristina Julio (born 1999), Chilean footballer
- Maria Kapnisi, Greek footballer
- Maria Khan (born 1990), Pakistani footballer
- Mária Korenčiová (born 1989), Slovak footballer
- Maria Kun (born 1973), Swedish footballer
- Maria Lazarou (born 1972), Greek footballer
- Maria Lindblad Christensen (born 1996), Danish footballer
- María Llompart (born 2000), Spanish footballer
- Maria Manda (born 2003), Bangladeshi footballer
- Maria Mariotti (born 1964), Italian footballer
- Maria Matthaiou (born 1997), Cypriot footballer
- Maria Makowska (born 1969), Polish footballer
- María Méndez (born 2001), Spanish footballer
- María Miret (born 1995), Spanish footballer
- Maria Mitkou (born 1994), Greek footballer
- Maria Møller Thomsen, Danish footballer
- María Monterroso (born 1993), Guatemalan footballer
- Maria Moiseeva (born 1986), Uzbekistani footballer
- Maria Moles (born 2003), Andorran footballer
- Maria Moloney (born 1995), Australian rules footballer
- Maria Uhre Nielsen (born 1999), Danish footballer
- Maria Nordbrandt (born 1985), Swedish footballer
- Maria Olsvik (born 1994), Norwegian footballer
- Maria Orav (born 1996), Estonian footballer
- Maria Palama (born 2000), Greek footballer
- Maria Panagiotou, Cypriot footballer
- Maria Paterna (born 2000), Greek footballer
- Maria Ilaria Pasqui, Italian association football player
- Maria Petri (1939–2022), English association football supporter
- María Peraza (born 1994), Venezuelan footballer
- Maria Plattner (born 2001), Austrian footballer
- Maria Pigaleva (born 1981), Russian footballer
- María Pry (born 1984), Spanish football manager
- Maria Rebello, India football referee
- María Camila Reyes (born 2002), Colombian footballer
- María Eugenia Rubio (footballer), Mexican footballer
- Maria Ruzafa (born 1998), Andorran footballer
- Maria-Frances Serrant (born 2002), Trinidad and Tobago footballer
- Maria Sorvillo (born 1982), Italian footballer
- Maria Spînu (born 1985), Moldovan footballer
- Maria Stamate (born 1999), Romanian footballer
- Maria Te Huia, New Zealand footballer
- Maria Thomsen (born 1995), Faroese footballer
- Maria Thorisdottir (born 1993), Norwegian footballer
- María Valle, Spanish footballer
- Maria Yatrakis (born 1980), American-born Greek footballer and manager
- María Fernanda Zúñiga (born 1997), Chilean footballer

==== Gymnasts ====
- Maria Luiza Albuquerque (born 2011), Brazilian rhythmic gymnast
- María Jesús Alegre (born 1957), Spanish rhythmic gymnast
- Maria Eduarda Alexandre (born 2007), Brazilian rhythmic gymnast
- Maria Laura Amorim (born 1932), Portuguese gymnast
- María Añó, Spanish rhythmic gymnast
- Maria Apostolidi (born 1988), Greek artistic gymnast
- Maria Eduarda Arakaki (born 2003), Brazilian rhythmic gymnast
- Maria Aszklar (born 2009), Polish rhythmic gymnast
- Maria Avgousti (born 2008), Cypriot rhythmic gymnast
- Maria Bila (born 1987), Ukrainian rhythmic gymnast
- Maria Bondareva (born 1999), Russian artistic gymnast
- Maria Borisova (born 2007), Russian artistic gymnast
- Maria Paula Caminha (born 2008), Brazilian rhythmic gymnast
- Maria Ceplinschi (born 2005), Romanian artistic gymnast
- Maria Cocuzza (born 1973), Italian gymnast
- Maria Helena Cunha (born 1943), Portuguese gymnast
- Maria Filatova (born 1961), Soviet gymnast
- María Flores-Wurmser (born 1971), Guatemalan gymnast
- Maria Georgatou (born 1984), Greek rhythmic gymnast
- Maria Gorokhovskaya (1921–2001), Soviet gymnast
- Mária Hámos (1911–?), Hungarian gymnast
- María Antonieta Hernández (born 1958), Mexican gymnast
- Maria Holbură (born 2000), Romanian artistic gymnast
- Mária Homolová (born 1987), Slovak artistic gymnast
- Maria Kadobina (born 1997), Belarusian rhythmic gymnast
- Maria Kakiou (born 1989), Greek rhythmic gymnast
- Maria Kharenkova (born 1998), Russian-born Georgian artistic gymnast
- Maria Kitkarska (born 1995), Bulgarian-born Canadian rhythmic gymnast
- Maria Koleva (rhythmic gymnast) (born 1977), Bulgarian rhythmic gymnast
- Maria Kryuchkova (1988–2015), Russian artistic gymnast
- Maria Lazuk (born 1983), Belarusian rhythmic gymnast
- Maria Minaeva (born 2005), Russian artistic gymnast
- Maria Neculiță (born 1974), Romanian artistic gymnast
- Maria Olaru (born 1982), Romanian gymnast
- Maria Pangalou (born 1979), Greek rhythmic gymnast
- María Pardo (gymnast) (born 1979), Spanish rhythmic gymnast
- Maria Paseka (born 1995), Russian artistic gymnast
- Maria Sansaridou (born 1977), Greek rhythmic gymnast
- Maria Savenkov (born 1988), Israeli rhythmic gymnast
- Maria Sergeeva (born 2001), Russian individual rhythmic gymnast
- Maria Smirnova (born 1995), Azerbaijani artistic gymnast
- Maria Stolbova (born 1984), Russian group rhythmic gymnast
- Maria Titova (born 1997), Russian rhythmic gymnast
- Maria Tolkacheva (born 1997), Russian rhythmic gymnast
- Mária Tressel (born 1946), Hungarian gymnast
- Mária Zalai-Kövi (1924–2013), Hungarian gymnast
- Maria Zasypkina (born 1985), Russian artistic gymnast

==== Handball players ====
- Mária Berzsenyi (born 1946), Hungarian handball player
- Maria Bosi (born 1954), Romanian handball player
- Mária Eduardo (born 1973), Angolan handball player
- Maria Gonçalves (born 1976), Angolan handball player
- Maria Hjertner (born 1996), Norwegian handball player
- Mária Holešová (born 1993), Slovak handball player
- Maria Inês Jololo (born 1975), Angolan handball player
- Maria Kanaval (born 1997), Belarusian handball player
- Mária Končeková (born 1953), Slovak handball player
- Maria Kourdoulos (born 1993), British and Portuguese handball player
- Maria Lackovics (born 1950), Romanian handball player
- Maria Lykkegaard (born 1996), Danish handball player
- Mária Mohácsik (born 1990), Hungarian handball player
- María Núñez (born 1988), Spanish handball player
- Maria Olsson (born 1986), Swedish handball player
- María Prieto O'Mullony (born 1997), Spanish handball player
- Maria Pedro (born 1982), Angolan handball player
- Maria Raimundo (born 1979), Angolan handball player
- Maria Stokholm (born 1990), Danish handball player
- Maria Török-Duca (born 1959), Romanian handball player
- María de Uriarte (born 1992), Argentine handball player
- Mária Vadász (1950–2009), Hungarian handball player
- Maria Mose Vestergaard (born 1995), Danish handball player

==== Swimmers ====
- Maria Albert (born 1985), Estonian swimmer
- Maria Arrua (born 1999), Paraguayan swimmer
- Maria Astashkina (born 1999), Russian swimmer
- Maria Awori (born 1984), Kenyan swimmer
- María Pia Ayora (born 1962), Peruvian swimmer
- María Virginia Báez (born 1991), Paraguayan swimmer
- María Ballesteros (born 1956), Mexican swimmer
- María Barrera Zapata (born 2001), Colombian Paralympic swimmer
- María Bertelloti (born 1980), Argentine swimmer
- Maria Both (born 1941), Romanian swimmer
- María Bramont-Arias (born 1999), Peruvian swimmer
- Maria Brunlehner (born 2000), Kenyan swimmer
- Maria Bruno (born 1992), Brazilian synchronized swimmer
- Maria Bulakhova (born 1988), Russian swimmer
- María Carmen Collado (born 1983), Spanish swimmer
- María Corominas (born 1952), Spanish swimmer
- María Far Núñez (born 1998), Panamanian swimmer
- Mária Frank (1943–1992), Hungarian swimmer
- María Fuster (born 1985), Spanish swimmer
- María Virginia Garrone (born 1978), Argentine swimmer
- Maria Götze (born 1980), German Paralympic swimmer
- Maria Isabel Guerra (born 1955), Brazilian swimmer
- Maria Guimarães (born 1958), Brazilian swimmer
- Maria Harutjunjan (born 1995), Estonian swimmer
- Maria Paula Heitmann (born 1999), Brazilian swimmer
- María Hernández (born 2001), Nicaraguan swimmer
- María Hung (born 1960), Venezuelan swimmer
- Maria Huybrechts (1930–2023), Belgian swimmer
- María Juárez (born 1997), Spanish synchronized swimmer
- Maria Kameneva (born 1999), Russian swimmer
- Maria Kardum (born 1968), Swedish swimmer
- María Lardizábal (born 1968), Honduran swimmer
- Maria Lenk (1915–2007), Brazilian swimmer
- Mária Littomeritzky (1927–2017), Hungarian swimmer
- Maria Clara Lobo (born 1998), Brazilian synchronized swimmer
- Maria Eduarda Miccuci (born 1995), Brazilian synchronized swimmer
- María Mock (born 1957), Puerto Rican swimmer
- María Paz Monserrat (1956–2015), Spanish swimmer
- Maria Oeyen (1930–2018), Belgian swimmer
- María Olay (born 1978), Spanish swimmer
- Maria Östling (born 1978), Swedish swimmer
- Maria Cristina Pacifici (born 1945), Italian swimmer
- Maria Pallas (born 1993), Estonian swimmer
- Maria Papadopoulou (born 1980), Cypriot swimmer
- María París (born 1961), Costa Rican swimmer
- María Peláez (born 1977), Spanish swimmer
- Maria Poiani Panigati (born 1982), Italian Paralympic swimmer
- María Procopio (born 1951), Argentine swimmer
- María Carmen Riu Pascual (born 1951), Spanish swimmer
- Maria Romanjuk (born 1996), Estonian swimmer
- Maria Schutzmeier (born 1999), Nicaraguan swimmer
- Maria Shurochkina (born 1995), Russian synchronized swimmer
- Maria Strumolo (born 1949), Italian swimmer
- Maria Temnikova (born 1995), Russian swimmer
- Maria Tregubova (born 1984), Moldovan swimmer
- Maria Ugolkova (born 1989), Swiss swimmer
- María Urbina (born 1968), Mexican swimmer
- Maria Van Den Brande (born 1925), Belgian swimmer
- Maria Vierdag (1905–2005), Dutch swimmer
- María Vilas (born 1996), Spanish swimmer

==== Runners ====
- María Abel (born 1974), Spanish long-distance runner
- Maria Ahm (born 1998), Danish long-distance runner
- Maria Akraka (born 1966), Swedish middle-distance runner
- María del Carmen Cárdenas (born 1959), Mexican long-distance runner
- Maria Chiara Cascavilla (born 1995), Italian long-distance runner
- Maria Cioncan (1977–2007), Romanian middle-distance runner
- Maria Curatolo (born 1963), Italian long-distance runner
- Maria Cristina Grosu-Mazilu (born 1976), Romanian long-distance runner
- Maria Guida (born 1966), Italian long-distance runner
- Maria Larsson (athlete) (born 1994), Swedish steeplechase runner
- Maria McCambridge (born 1975), Irish long-distance runner
- Maria Mutola (born 1972), Mozambican middle-distance runner
- María Peralta (born 1977), Argentine runner
- Maria Polyzou (born 1968), Greek long-distance runner
- María Cristina Petite (born 1972), Spanish long-distance runner
- María Portillo (born 1972), Peruvian marathon runner
- Maria Protopappa (born 1973), Greek long-distance runner
- Maria Radu (born 1959), Romanian long-distance runner
- María Lorena Ramírez (born 1995), Mexican long-distance runner
- Maria Rebelo (born 1956), French long-distance runner
- Maria Ritter (born 1957), Liechtenstein middle-distance runner
- Maria Rodrigues (born 1971), Brazilian long-distance runner
- María Gracia Varas (2001–2025), Chilean athlete

==== Skaters ====
- Maria Anikanova (1916–2005), Soviet speed skater
- Maria Artemieva (born 1993), Russian figure skater
- Maria Balaba (born 1988), Latvian figure skater
- Maria Butyrskaya (born 1972), Russian figure skater
- Maria Isakova (1918–2011), Soviet speed skater
- Maria Jelinek (born 1942), Canadian figure skater
- Maria Jeżak-Athey, Polish figure skater and coach
- Maria Krasiltseva (born 1981), Armenian figure skater
- Maria Lamb (born 1986), American speed skater
- Maria Levushkina (born 2004), Bulgarian figure skater
- Maria McLean, British figure skater
- Maria Mukhortova (born 1985), Russian pair skater
- Maria Nikitochkina (born 1979), Belarusian figure skater
- Maria Olszewska-Lelonkiewicz (1939–2007), Polish figure skating coach
- Maria Pavlova, Hungarian pair skater
- Maria Paliakova (born 1992), Belarusian pair skater
- Maria Reikdal (born 2008), Brazilian figure skater
- Mária Saáry (1928–?), Hungarian figure skater
- Maria Sergejeva (born 1992), Estonian figure skater and model
- Maria Sotskova (born 2000), Russian figure skater
- Maria Stavitskaia (born 1997), Russian figure skater
- Maria Sterk (born 1979), Dutch marathon speed skater
- Maria Vigalova (born 1999), Russian pair skater
- Maria Zuchowicz (1930–2020), Polish figure skating official

==== Skiers ====
- Maria Bedareva (born 1992), Russian alpine skier
- Maria Gąsienica Bukowa-Kowalska (1936–2020), Polish cross-country skier
- Maria Constantin (skier) (born 2001), Romanian alpine skier
- Maria Gąsienica Daniel-Szatkowska (1936–2016), Polish alpine skier
- Maria Despas (born 1967), Australian freestyle skier
- Maria Epple (born 1959), German alpine skier
- Maria Gerboth (born 2002), German Nordic combined skier and ski jumper
- Maria Gusakova (1931–2022), Soviet cross-country skier
- Maria Höfl-Riesch (born 1984), German alpine skier
- Maria Holaus (born 1983), Austrian alpine skier
- Mária Honzová (born 1969), Czech orienteering competitor
- Maria Kechkina (born 1986), Russian orienteer
- Maria Kirkova (born 1986), Bulgarian alpine skier
- Maria Kowalska (born 1929), Polish alpine skier
- Maria Maricich (born 1961), American alpine skier
- Maria Ntanou (born 1990), Greek cross-country skier
- Maria Nysted Grønvoll (born 1985), Norwegian cross-country skier
- Maria Pietilä Holmner (born 1986), Swedish alpine skier
- Maria Rautio (born 1957), Swedish cross-country skier
- Maria Rydqvist (born 1983), Swedish cross-country skier
- Maria Roberta Schranz (born 1952), Italian alpine skier
- María Cristina Schweizer (1940–1994), Argentine alpine skier
- Maria Shkanova (born 1989), Belarusian alpine skier
- María Belén Simari Birkner (born 1982), Argentine alpine skier
- Mária Tarnai (born 1941), Hungarian cross-country skier
- Maria Theurl (born 1966), Austrian cross-country skier
- Maria Trebunia (born 1956), Polish cross-country skier
- Maria Therese Tviberg (born 1994), Norwegian alpine ski racer
- Maria Walliser (born 1963), Swiss alpine skier
- Maria Zaruc (born 1977), Romanian alpine skier

==== Sprinters ====
- Maria Alfero (1922–2001), Italian sprinter
- Maria Laura Almirão (born 1977), Brazilian sprinter
- Maria Apollonio (1919–1990), Italian sprinter
- Maria Arndt (1929–2000), Polish sprinter
- Mária Bácskai (born 1938), Hungarian sprinter
- Maria Belibasaki (born 1991), Greek sprinter
- Maria Benedicta Chigbolu (born 1989), Italian sprinter
- Maria Gatou (born 1989), Greek sprinter
- María Alejandra Idrobo (born 1988), Colombian sprinter
- Maria Ikelap (born 1987), Micronesian sprinter
- Maria Itkina (1932–2020), Soviet sprinter
- Maria Karastamati (born 1984), Greek sprinter
- Mária Kiss (born 1949), Hungarian sprinter
- Maria Kusion-Bibro (1936–1996), Polish sprinter
- María Fernanda Mackenna (born 1986), Chilean sprinter
- Maria Oberbreyer (1921–2000), Austrian sprinter
- Maria Rus (born 1983), Romanian sprinter
- Maria Samungi (born 1950), Romanian sprinter
- Maria Sander (1924–1999), German sprinter
- Maria Enrica Spacca (born 1986), Italian sprinter
- Maria Sykora (born 1946), Austrian sprinter
- Maria Tsoni (born 1963), Greek sprinter

==== Tennis players ====
- Maria Abramović (born 1987), Croatian tennis player
- Maria Alexandru (1939–2024), Romanian table tennis player
- Maria Francesca Bentivoglio (born 1977), Italian tennis player
- Maria Bogoslov (born 1970), Romanian table tennis player
- Maria Bondarenko (born 2003), Russian tennis player
- Maria-Cristina Borba-Dias (born 1951), Brazilian tennis player
- Maria Bueno (1939–2018), Brazilian tennis player
- María Cabrera (born 1972), Ecuadorian table tennis player
- María Lourdes Carlé (born 2000), Argentine tennis player
- Maria Ekstrand (born 1970), Swedish tennis player
- Mária Fazekas (born 1975), Hungarian table tennis player
- Maria Catrinel Folea, Romanian table tennis player
- Maria Inês Fonte (born 2002), Portuguese tennis player
- María Virginia Francesa (born 1974), Venezuelan tennis player
- Maria Geznenge (born 1977), Bulgarian tennis player
- Maria Goloviznina (born 1979), Russian tennis player
- María Eugenia Guzmán (1945–1996), Ecuadorian tennis player
- María Irigoyen (born 1987), Argentine tennis player
- Maria Jespersen (born 1991), Danish tennis player
- Maria Kirilenko (born 1987), Russian tennis player
- Maria Kondratieva (born 1982), Russian tennis player
- Maria Kononova (born 1997), Russian tennis player
- María Fernanda Landa (born 1975), Argentine tennis player
- Maria Lindström (born 1963), Swedish tennis player
- Maria Marfutina (born 1997), Russian tennis player
- Maria Mateas (born 1999), American tennis player
- Mária Mednyánszky (1901–1978), Hungarian table tennis player
- Maria Mirou (born 1977), Greek table tennis player
- Maria Mokh (born 1990), Russian tennis player
- María Fernanda Navarro Oliva (born 1996), Mexican tennis player
- Maria Nardelli (born 1954), Italian para table tennis player
- Maria Pavlidou (born 1978), Greek tennis player
- Maria Penkova (born 1984), Bulgarian tennis player
- Maria Sara Popa (born 2005), Romanian tennis player
- María Portillo Ramírez (born 1999), Mexican tennis player
- Maria Chiara Ramorino (born 1931), Italian orienteer and tennis player
- María Luciana Reynares (born 1976), Argentine tennis player
- Maria Sakkari (born 1995), Greek professional tennis player
- María Emilia Salerni (born 1983), Argentine tennis player
- Maria Sharapova (born 1987), Russian professional tennis player
- Maria Strandlund (born 1969), Swedish tennis player
- Maria Timofeeva (born 2003), Russian tennis player
- Maria Tsaptsinos (born 1997), English table tennis player
- María Vento-Kabchi (born 1974), Venezuelan tennis player
- María Paulina Vega (born 1984), Chilean table tennis player
- Maria Passos (born 1951), Brazilian para table tennis player
- Maria Wolfbrandt (born 1979), Swedish tennis player
- María Xiao (born 1994), Spanish table tennis player
- Maria Paola Zavagli (born 1977), Italian tennis player
- Maria Zharkova (born 1988), Russian tennis player

==== Rowers ====
- María Laura Abalo (born 1981), Argentine rower
- Maria Botalova, Russian rower
- Maria Dzieża (born 1949), Polish rower
- María Fernanda de la Fuente (born 1955), Mexican rower
- Maria Fricioiu (born 1960), Romanian rower
- María Garisoain (born 1971), Argentine rower
- Maria Kobylińska (born 1960), Polish rower
- Maria Kusters-ten Beitel (born 1949), Dutch rower
- Maria Kyridou (born 2001), Greek rower
- Maria Leibetseder (born 1959), Austrian rower
- Maria Maunder (born 1972), Canadian rower
- Maria Micșa (born 1953), Romanian rower
- Maria Paziun (born 1953), Soviet rower
- Maria Păduraru (born 1970), Romanian rower
- Maria Sajdak (born 1991), Polish rower
- Maria Sakellaridou (born 1981), Greek rower
- Maria Sava, Romanian rower
- Maria Stadnicka (born 1951), Polish rower
- Maria Tivodariu (born 1999), Romanian rower
- Maria Wierzbowska (born 1995), Polish rower
- Maria Zemskova-Korotkova (born 1953), Russian rowing coxswain

==== Volleyball players ====
- Maria Elisa Antonelli (born 1984), Brazilian beach volleyball player
- María de Fátima Acosta (born 1992), Peruvian volleyball player
- Maria Bocharova (born 2002), Russian beach volleyball player
- Maria Borodakova (born 1986), Russian volleyball player
- Maria Bruntseva (born 1980), Russian volleyball player
- María Cervera (1956–2018), Peruvian volleyball player
- Maria Chatzinikolaou (born 1978), Greek volleyball player
- Maria Chivorchian (born 1982), Romanian volleyball player
- Maria Dancheva (born 1995), Bulgarian volleyball player
- Maria Frolova (born 1986), Russian volleyball player
- Maria Garagouni (born 1975), Greek volleyball player
- Mária Gál (1945–2014), Hungarian volleyball player
- Maria Golimowska (born 1932), Polish volleyball player
- Maria Kochwa (1966–2014), Kenyan volleyball player
- Maria Likhtenstein (born 1976), Russian-Croatian volleyball player
- Maria Liktoras (born 1975), Polish volleyball player
- Mária Mališová (born 1945), Slovak volleyball player
- Maria Manicova (born 1974), Ukrainian volleyball player
- María Marín (born 1995), Colombian volleyball player
- María Eugenia Nieto (born 1986), Uruguayan beach volleyball player
- Maria Nomikou (born 1993), Greek volleyball player
- María José Orellana (born 1981), Guatemalan beach volleyball player
- María Ostolaza (born 1953), Peruvian volleyball player
- Maria Perepelkina (born 1984), Russian volleyball player
- Maria Plagiannakou (born 1978), Greek volleyball player
- Maria Śliwka (1935–1997), Polish volleyball player
- Maria Stenzel (born 1998), Polish volleyball player
- Maria Tsarenko (born 1976), Azerbaijani volleyball player
- Maria Tsiartsiani (born 1980), Greek beach volleyball player
- Maria Volchkova (born 1978), Azerbaijani volleyball player
- Maria Valero (born 1991), Venezuelan volleyball player
- Maria Voronina (born 2000), Russian beach volleyball player
- María Zonta (born 1989), Argentine beach volleyball player
- Mária Žernovič (born 1993), Slovak volleyball player

==== Water polo players ====
- Maria Barbara Amaro (born 1986), Brazilian water polo player
- Maria Balomenaki (born 1983), Greek water polo player
- Maria Bersneva (born 1998), Russian water polo player
- Maria Borisova (born 1997), Russian water polo player
- Maria Kanellopoulou (born 1947), Greek water polo player
- Maria Koroleva (born 1974), Russian water polo player
- Maria Kovtunovskaya (born 1988), Russian water polo player
- Maria Cecília Marques, Brazilian water polo player
- Maria Patra (born 1998), Greece water polo player
- Maria Tsouri (born 1986), Greek water polo player
- Maria Yaina (born 1982), Russian water polo player

==== Ballet dancers ====
- Maria Abashova (born 1983), Russian ballet dancer
- Maria Alexandrova (born 1978), Russian ballet dancer
- Maria Allash (born 1976), Russian ballet dancer
- Maria Bulanova (born 2001), Russian ballet dancer
- Maria Calegari, American ballet dancer, teacher and répétiteur
- Maria Casentini (1778–1805), Austrian ballet dancer
- Maria Danilova (1793–1810), Russian ballet dancer
- Maria Eichwald (born 1974), Kazakh ballet dancer
- Maria Ikonina (1788–1838), Russian ballerina
- Maria Khoreva (born 2000), Russian ballet dancer
- Maria Kochetkova (born 1984), Russian ballet dancer
- Maria Kowroski (born 1976), American ballet dancer
- Maria Tallchief (1925–2013), American ballerina
- Maria Viganò, Austrian ballet dancer
- Maria Westberg (1853–1893), Swedish ballerina

==== Ice dancers ====
- Maria Borounov (born 1982), Australian former competitive ice dancer
- Maria Filippov (born 1973), Bulgarian ice dancer
- Maria Monko (born 1990), Russian ice dancer
- Maria Simonova (born 1996), Russian ice dancer

==== Other sportspeople ====
- María Acosta (born 1991), Venezuelan freestyle wrestler
- Maria Andrade (born 1993), Cape Verdean taekwondo athlete
- Maria Andrejczyk (born 1996), Polish javelin thrower
- María Arceo (born 1965), Cuban softball player
- Maria Areosa (born 1984), Portuguese triathlete
- Maria Astrologes (born 1951), American professional golfer
- Maria Antonietta Avanzo (1889–1977), Italian racetrack driver
- Maria Angelica Ayala (born 1964), Filipina dressage rider
- Maria Chiara Baccini (born 1981), Italian long jumper
- Maria Gertrudis Barceló (1805–1852), American gambler
- María Carmen Barea (born 1966), Spanish field hockey player
- Maria Bartusz (born 1987), Polish para badminton player
- María Barreiro (born 1999), Uruguayan field hockey player
- Maria Batalova (born 1996), Russian ice hockey player
- María Belén Bazo (born 1998), Peruvian windsurfer
- María Bernabéu (born 1988), Spanish judoka
- María Paula Bernal (born 1971), Colombian equestrian
- Maria Bernard (born 1993), Canadian track and field athlete
- Maria Bertilsköld (born 1970), Swedish professional golfer
- Maria Luísa Betioli (born 1948), Brazilian high jumper
- Maria Bodén (born 1978), Swedish golfer
- Maria Boldor (born 1996), Romanian fencer
- Maria Bulanova (born 1998), Russian ten-pin bowler
- Maria Caetano (born 1986), Portuguese dressage rider
- María Cangá (1962–2023), Ecuadorian judoka
- Maria Carla Bresciani (born 1973), Italian pole vaulter
- Maria Caruso, American dancer and choreographer
- María Castelli (born 1972), Argentine field hockey player
- Maria Catalano (born 1982), English snooker player
- Maria Centracchio (born 1994), Italian judoka
- Maria Cerra (1918–2015), American fencer
- Maria Assunta Chiummariello (born 1958), Italian shot putter
- Maria Christoforidou (born 1964), Greek weightlifter
- Maria Ciach (1933–2009), Polish javelin thrower
- Maria Cipriano (born 1943), Brazilian high jumper
- Maria Coburn (born 2001), American diver
- Maria Cocchetti (born 1966), Italian athletics competitor
- Maria Coleman (born 1969), Irish sailor
- Maria Consolata Collino (born 1947), Italian fencer
- Maria-Joëlle Conjungo (born 1975), Central African Republic hurdler
- Maria Constantin (born 1991), Romanian bobsledder
- Maria Conway (born 1984), British motorcycle racer
- María Caridad Colón (born 1958), Cuban javelin thrower
- Maria Costello (born 1973), British female motorcycle racer
- Maria Creveling (1995–2019), legal name of Remilia, American professional gamer
- María Cubillán (born 1981), Venezuelan discus thrower
- Mária Czaková (born 1988), Slovak race-walker
- Maria Cześnik (born 1977), Polish triathlete
- Maria Danielsson (born 1981), Swedish snowboarder
- Maria de Souza (born 1971), Brazilian triple jumper
- María de Villota (1979–2013), Spanish racing driver
- Maria Diaconescu (born 1937), Romanian javelin thrower
- Maria Dibiasi, Italian luger
- María Dimitrova (born 1985), Dominican martial artist
- Maria Dunn (wrestler), Guamanian wrestler
- Maria Duyunova (born 1990), Russian curler
- María Echavarría (born 1960), Colombian archer
- Maria Eilberg (born 1984), British dressage rider
- Mária Érdi (born 1998), Hungarian sailor
- Maria Erhart (1944–2011), Austrian bridge player
- María Espínola (born 1974), Argentine windsurfer
- María Espinoza (born 1987), Mexican taekwondo practitioner
- Maria Fahey (born 1984), New Zealand cricketer
- Maria Faka (born 1983), Greek sport shooter
- María Fassi (born 1998), Mexican professional golfer
- Maria Magnólia Figueiredo (born 1963), Brazilian athlete
- Maria Feichter (born 1982), Italian luger
- Maria Feklistova (born 1976), Russian sport shooter
- María Paz Ferrari (born 1973), Argentine field hockey player
- María Cecilia Floriddia (born 1980), Argentine weightlifter
- Maria Folau (born 1987), New Zealand netball player
- María Forero (born 2002), Spanish athlete
- María Gabriela Franco (born 1981), Venezuelan sport shooter
- Maria Fransisca, Indonesian badminton player
- María Fux (1922–2023), Argentine dancer
- Maria Gallo (born 1977), Canadian rugby union player
- Maria Gaspari (born 1991), Italian curler
- Mária Gáliková (born 1980), Slovak racewalker
- María Giro (born 1971), Argentine biathlete
- Maria Golubnichaya (1924–2015), Soviet track and field athlete
- Maria Gontowicz-Szałas (born 1965), Polish judoka
- Maria Grötzer (born 1928), Austrian fencer
- Maria Gretzer (born 1958), Swedish equestrian
- Maria Grozdeva (born 1972), Bulgarian sports shooter
- Maria Iêda Guimarães, Brazilian modern pentathlete
- Mária Gulácsy (1941–2015), Hungarian fencer
- Maria Gushchina, Russian sport shooter
- Maria Gurova (born 1989), Russian freestyle wrestler
- Maria Hasselborg (born 1980), Swedish curler
- Maria Helsbøl (born 1989), Danish badminton player
- Mária Herichová (born 1990), Slovak ice hockey player
- María Hernández (born 1986), Spanish golfer
- María de la Paz Hernández (born 1977), Argentine field hockey player
- María Herrera (born 1996), Spanish motorcycle racer
- Maria Hjorth (born 1973), Swedish professional golfer
- Maria Holm Peters (born 1999), Danish ice hockey player
- Maria Huntington (born 1997), Finnish long jumper and heptathlete
- Maria Iovleva (born 1990), Russian Paralympic biathlete
- Maria Isser (1929–2011), Austrian luger
- Mária Janák (born 1958), Hungarian javelin thrower
- Mária Jasenčáková (born 1957), Slovak luger
- María José Alcalá (born 1971), Mexican diver
- Maria Elisabete Jorge (born 1957), Brazilian weightlifter
- María Juncal, Spanish flamenco dancer
- Maria Kamrowska (born 1966), Polish heptathlete
- Maria Kanellis (born 1982), American professional wrestler
- Maria Kang, American fitness advocate, coach and blogger
- Maria Karagiannopoulou (born 1972), Greek judoka
- Maria Kirchgasser (born 1970), Austrian snowboarder
- Maria Klemetz (born 1976), Finnish sailor
- Maria Komarova (born 1998), Russian curler
- Maria Komissarova (born 1990), Russian athlete
- Maria Konstantatou (born 1981), Greek diver
- Maria Kornek (born 1960), Polish hockey player
- Maria Kostina (born 1983), Russian golfer
- Maria Krahe (born 1970), Brazilian sailor
- Mária Kucserka (born 1951), Hungarian javelin thrower
- Maria Kurjo (born 1989), German diver
- Maria Febe Kusumastuti (born 1989), Indonesian badminton player
- Maria Kwaśniewska (1913–2007), Polish javelin thrower
- María La Ribot (born 1962), Spanish-Swiss dancer, choreographer and visual artist
- Maria Celia Laborde (born 1990), Cuban judoka
- Maria Larsson (curler), Swedish curler
- Maria Larsson (ice hockey) (born 1979), Swedish ice hockey player
- Maria Leitner (born 1981), Italian ice hockey player
- Maria Liku (born 1990), Fijian weightlifter
- Maria Lindberg (born 1977), Swedish boxer
- Maria Lindh (born 1993), Swedish ice hockey player
- María Lobón (born 1995), Colombian weightlifter
- Maria Natalia Londa (born 1990), Indonesian athlete
- Maria Lyle (born 2000), Scottish Paralympic athlete
- Maria Machava, Mozambican sailor
- Maria Malyjasiak (born 1989), Brazilian jiu-jitsu practitioner from Poland
- Maria Martynova, Belarusian sports shooter
- Maria Marconi (born 1984), Italian diver
- Maria Macovei (born 1960), Romanian sports shooter
- Maria Mączyńska (born 1932), Polish archer
- Maria Machongua (born 1993), Mozambican boxer
- Maria Marello (born 1961), Italian discus thrower and coach
- Maria Marinela Mazilu (born 1991), Romanian skeleton racer
- Maria Mazina (born 1964), Russian Olympic champion épée fencer
- Maria Stella Masocco (born 1948), Italian discus thrower and shot putter
- Maria Mattheussens-Fikkers (born 1949), Dutch field hockey player
- Maria Maioru (born 1959), Romanian luger
- María Florencia Manfredi, Argentine equestrian
- Maria Mollestad (born 1996), Norwegian windsurfer
- Mária Melová-Henkel (born 1975), Slovak high jumper
- María Monica Merenciano (born 1984), Spanish Paralympic judoka
- Maria Michta-Coffey (born 1986), American race walker
- Maria Costanza Moroni (born 1969), Italian high, long and triple jumper
- María Moronta (born 1996), Dominican boxer
- Maria Teresa Motta (born 1963), Italian judoka
- Mária Mračnová (born 1946), Slovak high jumper
- Maria Muchavo (born 1992), Mozambican athlete
- Maria Liana Mutia, American Paralympic judoka
- Maria Musso (1931–2024), Italian athlete
- Maria Mylona (born 1974), Greek sailor
- Maria Nápoles (1936–2024), Portuguese fencer
- María Nieto (born 1999), Spanish karateka
- María Nieves (1934–2026), Argentine tango dancer and choreographer
- Maria Orlova (born 1988), Russian skeleton racer
- María Vanesa Ortega Godoy (born 1981), Spanish Paralympic athlete
- Mária Pap (born 1955), Hungarian long jumper
- María Parra (born 1997), Spanish professional golfer
- María Gabriela Pazos (born 1967), Argentine field hockey player
- Maria Pechnikova (born 1992), Russian ice hockey player
- Maria Piątkowska (1931–2020), Polish sportsperson
- Maria Pekli (born 1972), Australian judoka
- Maria Pogee (born 1942), Argentine-American dancer
- Maria Portela (born 1988), Brazilian judoka
- Maria Poulsen (born 1984), Danish curler
- Maria Prevolaraki (born 1991), Greek freestyle wrestler
- Maria Prytz (born 1976), Swedish curler
- Maria Quarra (born 1965), Italian yacht racer
- María Quintanal (born 1969), Spanish sport shooter
- Maria Rentoumi (born 1981), Greek fencer
- María Begoña Redal (born 1975), Spanish goal-ball player
- María Reyes (archer) (born 1964), Puerto Rican archer
- María Reyes Sobrino (born 1967), Spanish race walker
- María Ribera (born 1986), Spanish rugby sevens player
- Maria Rigby (born 1962), Australian international lawn bowler
- María Romagosa (born 1985), Spanish field hockey player
- María Cecilia Román (born 1983), Argentine boxer
- María Romano (born 1931), Argentine fencer
- Maria Rooth (born 1979), Swedish ice hockey player
- María Ruanova (1912–1976), Argentine dancer
- María Carmen Rubio (born 1961), Spanish Paralympic archer
- Maria Saarni (born 1977), Finnish ice hockey player
- Maria Samson (born 1983), Canadian rugby player
- María Santana, Cuban softball player
- María Jesús Santolaria, Spanish taekwondo practitioner
- Maria Schylander (born 1973), Swedish biathlete
- Maria Scutti (1928–2005), Italian Paralympic athlete
- Maria Selmaier (born 1991), German freestyle wrestler
- Maria Semczyszak (born 1933), Polish luger
- Maria Seifert (born 1991), German Paralympic athlete
- María Fernanda Sesto (born 1976), Argentine sailor
- María Shaw (born 1939), Spanish fencer
- Maria Shegurova (born 1993), Russian badminton player
- María Alicia Sinigaglia (born 1964), Argentine fencer
- Maria Sołtan (1921–2001), Polish fencer
- María Soto (born 1978), Venezuelan softball player
- Maria Spelterini (1853–1912), Italian tightrope walker
- Maria Spirescu (born 1980), Romanian bobsledder
- Maria Stamatoula (born 1972), Greek Paralympic athlete
- Maria Steensma, Dutch field hockey player
- Maria Stern (poker player), Costa Rican poker player
- Maria Suelen Altheman (born 1988), Brazilian judoka
- Maria Sund, Swedish Paralympian
- Maria Szeliga (born 1952), Polish archer
- Mária Szolnoki (born 1947), Hungarian fencer
- Maria Tatsi (born 1971), Greek weightlifter
- María Celia Tejerina (born 1994), Argentine windsurfer
- Maria Testa (1956–2009), Italian archer
- Maria Tietze (born 1989), German Paralympic athlete
- Maria Toorpakai Wazir (born 1990), Pakistani squash player
- María Torres (born 1997), Spanish karateka
- Maria Torres (golfer), Puerto Rican professional golfer
- María Tost (born 1994), Spanish field hockey player
- Maria Tranchina (born 1968), Italian athletics competitor
- Maria Vittoria Trio (born 1947), Italian long jumper
- Maria Tselaridou (born 1981), Greek judoka
- Maria Udrea (born 1990), Romanian fencer
- Maria Urban, West German archer
- Mária Urbanik (born 1967), Hungarian race walker
- María Uribe (1908–1992), Mexican javelin thrower
- Maria Usifo (born 1964), Nigerian hurdler
- María Vasco (born 1975), Spanish race walker
- Maria Verchenova (born 1986), Russian professional golfer
- Maria Verschoor (born 1994), Dutch field hockey player
- María Vicente (born 2001), Spanish athletics competitor
- Maria Vicol (1935–2015), Romanian fencer
- María Eugenia Villamizar (born 1970), Colombian hammer thrower
- María Villapol (born 1967), Venezuelan judoka
- Maria Andrea Virgilio (born 1996), Italian Paralympic archer
- Maria Vlachou (born 1973), Greek sailor
- Maria Vryoni (born 1982), Greek freestyle wrestler
- Maria Wennerström (born 1985), Swedish curler
- Maria Winn-Ratliff, American softball coach
- Maria Kristin Yulianti (born 1985), Indonesian badminton player
- Maria Zandbang (1886–1972), Polish equestrian
- Maria Zdravkova, Bulgarian biathlete

=== Musicians ===
- Maria Kalaniemi (born 1964), Finnish musician
- Maria Kämmerling (born 1946), German musician
- Maria Carta (1934–1994), Sardinian musician
- Maria Răducanu (born 1967), Romanian musician
- Maria Newman (born 1962), American musician
- Maria Badstue, Danish orchestral conductor
- Maria Eklund (born 1973), Russian-born Swedish conductor
- Maria Nalbandian (born 1985), Armenian-Lebanese musician
- Maria Anna Mozart (1751–1829), Austrian musician
- Maria Kannegaard (born 1970), Danish-born Norwegian jazz musician
- Maria Minerva (born 1988), Estonian musician
- Maria Kryvko (born 1946), Ukrainian musician
- Maria Kotlyarevskaya-Kraft, Soviet and Russian musicologist
- María Villalón (born 1989), Spanish musical artist
- Maria Makino (born 2001), Japanese musical artist
- María Grand, Swiss musical artist
- Maria Devigili, Italian musical artist
- Maria Gadú (born 1986), Brazilian musical artist
- Maria Cordero (born 1954), Hong Kong musical artist
- Maria Rivarola (born 1957), musical artist
- Maria Alejandra Quintanilla (born 1990), musical artist
- Maria Anna von Genzinger (1754–1793), Viennese musician
- Maria Sergeyevna Durnovo (1792–1856), Russian musician
- Maria Alice de Mendonça, Brazilian musician

==== Singers ====
- Filippo Maria Fanti (born 1995), know professionally as Irama, Italian singer-songwriter and rapper
- Maria (born 1978), Danish singer and songwriter
- Maria Agresta (born 1978), Italian operatic soprano
- María Conchita Alonso (born 1957), American singer/songwriter and actress
- Maria Ajzensztadt (1923–1942), Polish singer
- Maria Andersson (born 1981), Swedish singer, songwriter and guitarist
- Maria Armanda (born 1974), Portuguese child singing sensation
- Maria Lawson (born 1979), British singer
- Maria Aragon (born 2000), Canadian singer of Filipino descent
- Maria Arkhipova (born 1983), Russian heavy metal vocalist
- Maria Armoudian, American singer-songwriter
- Maria Arnal (born 1987), Spanish singer
- Maria Iankovskaia (born 2012), Russian singer, blogger and actress
- Maria Arredondo (born 1985), Norwegian singer
- Maria Azevedo, American singer
- Maria Barrientos (1884–1946), Spanish singer
- Mária Basilides (1886–1946), Hungarian opera singer
- María Bayo (born 1961), Spanish soprano
- María Becerra (born 2000), Argentine singer
- Maria Bethânia (born 1946), Brazilian singer
- Maria Francisca Bia (1809–1889), Dutch ballet dancer and opera singer
- Maria Bieșu (1935–2012), Moldovan singer
- Maria Billington Hawes, English contralto singer
- Maria Ilva Biolcati, as known as Milva (1939–2021), Italian singer, stage and film actress
- Maria Luigia Borsi, Italian opera singer
- Maria Brink (born 1977), American singer and songwriter
- Maria Bossenberger (1872–1919), German operatic soprano and voice teacher
- Maria Burmaka (born 1970), Ukrainian singer
- Maria Amapola Cabase (born 1948), Filipina singer, actress, musician, television and radio host
- Maria Catherine Callahan (born 1965), American singer songwriter
- Maria Callas (1923–1977), Greek-American soprano
- Maria Caniglia (1906–1979), Italian opera singer
- Maria Capuana (1891–1955), Italian opera singer
- Maria Carbone (1908–2002), Italian operatic soprano
- María Eugenia Ritó (born 1975), Argentine vedette
- Maria Carpena (1886–1915), Filipina actress and soprano singer
- María Carrasco (born 1995), Spanish singer
- Maria Cebotari (1910–1949), Romanian singer
- Maria Ceiça (born 1965), Brazilian actress, singer and performer
- Maria Chiara (born 1939), Italian lyric soprano
- Maria Christova (1937–2022), Russian soprano
- Maria Ciobanu (born 1937), Romanian folk singer
- María Cervantes (1885–1981), Cuban pianist, singer and composer
- Mária Čírová (born 1988), Slovak singer
- Maria Mirabela Cismaru, known by the stage name Mira, Romanian singer
- Maria Cole (1922–2012), American jazz singer
- Maria Dallas, New Zealand singer
- Maria d'Apparecida (1926–2017), Brazilian opera singer
- Maria d'Apparecida (1926–2017), Brazilian opera singer
- Maria de Croll, Swedish singer
- Maria de Francesca-Cavazza, German opera singer
- Maria de Medeiros (born 1965), Portuguese actress, film director and singer
- Maria de Vasconcelos (born 1970), Portuguese psychiatrist, singer and songwriter
- María del Monte (born 1962), Spanish singer
- Maria di Gerlando (1925–2010), American opera singer
- Maria Dickons (c. 1774–1833), British opera singer
- Maria Dimitriadi (1950–2009), Greek singer
- Maria do Carmo (fado singer) (1884–1964), Portuguese fado singer
- Maria Doyle-Cuche (born 1965), Irish singer
- Maria Doyle Kennedy (born 1964), Irish singer and actress
- Maria Dragoni (born 1958), Italian operatic soprano
- Maria Dunn (musician), Canadian singer
- María Duval (born 1937), Mexican actress and singer
- Maria Duchêne (1883–1947), French contralto
- Maria Giovanna Elmi (born 1940), Italian former television announcer, presenter, journalist, actress and singer
- María Gabriela Epumer (1963–2003), Argentine pop rock vocalist and guitarist
- María Ereña (born 1996), Spanish singer
- Maria Ewing (1950–2022), American opera singer
- Maria Farantouri (born 1947), Greek singer
- Maria Farneti (1878–1955), Italian opera singer
- María Félix (1914–2002), Mexican actress and singer
- Maria Friesenhausen (1932–2020), German classical soprano singer
- María Figueroa (born 2000), Spanish singer
- Maria Flécheux (1813–1842), French operatic singer
- Maria Fontosh (born 1976), Russian opera singer
- Maria Forescu (1875–1947), German actress and singer
- Maria Galvany (1878–1927), Spanish soprano
- Maria Gay (1876–1943), Catalan opera singer
- Maria Gelhaar, Swedish opera singer
- Maria Gerhart (1890–1975), Austrian operatic soprano
- Maria Gheorghiu (born 1963), Romanian folk singer and songwriter
- Maria Guinot (1945–2018), Portuguese singer
- Maria Haukaas Mittet (born 1979), Norwegian singer
- Maria Jane Hyde, British actor and singer
- Maria Ilieva (born 1977), Bulgarian singer, songwriter and a producer
- Maria Iliuț, Moldovan folk singer
- María Inés (born 1983), Mexican television host and singer
- María Isabel (born 1995), Spanish singer
- Maria Ivogün (1891–1987), German opera singer
- Maria Katinari, Greek actress, singer and lyricist
- Mária Kállai (born 1957), American professional wrestler, manager, singer and model
- Maria Keohane (born 1971), Swedish soprano
- Maria Kolokouri (1977 –2014), Greek black metal vocalist and multi-instrumentalist
- Maria Koterbska (1924–2021), Polish singer
- Maria Labia (1880–1953), Italian operatic soprano
- Maria Landini (1668–1722), Italian soprano
- María León (born 1986), Mexican singer
- Maria Linley (1763–1784), English singer
- Maria Litvinenko-Volgemut (1892–1966), Soviet opera singer, music educator and actor
- Maria Lynn Ehren (born 1992), Thai singer and model
- Maria Madlen Madsen (1905–1990), German opera singer
- Maria Malibran (1808–1836), Spanish opera singer
- Maria Manina, Italian opera singer
- Maria Maksakova Jr. (born 1977), Russian opera singer
- Maria Markesini, Greek singer and jazz pianist
- Maria McCool (born 1974), Irish singer
- Maria McKee (born 1964), American singer-songwriter
- María Mendiola (1952–2021), Spanish singer
- Maria Mena (born 1986), Norwegian singer
- María Mérida (1925–2022), Spanish singer
- Maria Mitzeva (born 1938), Bulgarian-born American pop singer
- Maria Montana (1893–1971), American operatic soprano
- Maria Mordasova (1915–1997), Russian singer
- Maria Moscisca (1882–1971), Polish operatic soprano
- Maria Mudryak (born 1994), Kazakhstani operatic soprano
- Maria Muldaur (born 1942), American folk and blues singer
- Maria Müller (1889–1958), Austrian opera singer
- Maria Murano (1918–2009), French opera singer
- Maria Mykolaichuk, Ukrainian singer and actress
- Maria Nayler (born 1972), British singer
- Maria Nazionale (born 1969), Italian pop singer and actress
- Maria Nemeth (1897–1967), Hungarian singer
- María Nieves Rebolledo Vila (born 1978), better known by her stage name Bebe, Spanish musical artist
- Maria Niklińska (born 1983), Polish actress and singer
- Maria Caterina Negri (1704–?), Italian opera singer
- María Fernanda Neil (born 1982), Argentine singer, actress and model
- Maria Olszewska (1892–1969), German opera singer
- Maria Severa Onofriana (1820–1846), Portuguese singer
- Maria Orefice (1893–1961), Italian-American opera singer
- María Orán (1943–2018), Spanish singer
- María Ólafsdóttir (born 1993), Icelandic singer
- Maria Katarina Öhrn (died 1783), Swedish actress and singer
- María Peláe, Spanish singer
- María Parrado (born 2001), Spanish singer
- Maria Pellegrini (born 1943), Canadian opera singer
- María Pulpillo, Spanish singer
- Maria Radner (1981–2015), German opera singer
- Maria Reining (1903–1991), Austrian opera singer
- Maria Rolf (born 1970), Swedish singer
- Maria Roe Vincent (born 1989), Indian playback singer
- Maria Lucia Rosenberg (born 1984), Danish singer and musical performer
- Maria Rita (born 1977), Brazilian singer
- Maria Rubia (born 1980), British singer
- María Eugenia Rubio (singer) (1933–2013), Mexican singer and actress
- Maria Sadowska (born 1976), Polish singer
- Maria Scicolone (born 1938), Italian television personality, columnist and singer
- María Martha Serra Lima (1942–2017), Argentine singer
- Maria Stader (1911–1999), Hungarian-born Swiss opera soprano
- Maria Stern (singer-songwriter) (born 1972), Austrian singer-songwriter and politician
- Maria Spacagna, American soprano
- Maria Spezia-Aldighieri (1828–1907), Italian operatic soprano
- Maria Sokil (1902–1999), Ukrainian opera singer
- Maria Solheim (born 1982), Norwegian singer-songwriter
- Maria Sur (born 2004), Ukrainian singer
- María Eugenia Suárez (born 1992), Argentine actress, singer and model
- Maria Tauberová (1911–2003), Czech opera singer
- Maria Tănase (1913–1963), Romanian singer and actress
- Mária Temesi (born 1957), Hungarian operatic soprano and university professor
- Maria Titarenko (1917–2002), Azerbaijani Soviet opera singer
- Maria Giustina Turcotti, 18th-century Italian opera singer
- María Edilia, Venezuelan drag performer
- María Turgenova (1900–1972), Spanish actress, singer and vedette
- Maria von Trapp (1905–1987), Austrian-born American singer
- Maria Franziska von Trapp (1914–2014), member of Trapp family singers
- María Uriz (born 1946), Spanish soprano
- Maria Veretenina, Estonian opera singer
- María Victoria (born 1927), Mexican singer, actress and comedian
- Maria Vidal (born 1960), American singer
- Maria Chantal Videla (born 2002), Filipino-Argentine actress, model and singer of K-pop girl group Lapillus
- Maria Riccarda Wesseling (born 1969), Swiss-Dutch operatic mezzo-soprano
- Maria Whittaker (born 1968), English former glamour model and singer
- Maria Wilson (born 1982), British singer
- Maria Winetzkaja (1889–1956), American opera singer
- Maria Zamboni (1895–1976), Italian operatic soprano
- Maria Zhorella Fedorova (1915–2017), Austrian opera singer

==== Composers ====
- María Enma Botet Dubois (1903–?), Cuban composer
- Maria Cattarina Calegari (1644–1662), Italian composer
- Maria Rosa Coccia (1759–1833), Italian harpsichordist and composer
- Maria Faust (born 1979), Estonian saxophonist and composer
- María Ester Grebe, Chilean ethnomusicologist
- Maria Grenfell, Australian composer
- María Grever (1885–1951), Mexican composer
- Maria Margherita Grimani (1650–1718), Italian composer
- Maria de Alvear (born 1960), Spanish-German composer
- Maria Semyonovna Zavalishina, Russian composer
- Maria Gabriella Zen (born 1957), Italian composer
- Maria Lamburn (born 1960), English composer
- Maria Lindsay (1827–1898), English composer and songwriter
- Maria Linnemann (born 1947), classical composer
- Maria Francesca Nascinbeni (1640–1680), Italian composer
- Maria Schüppel (1923–2011), German music therapist and composer
- Maria Sohlberg (1886–1973), Swedish composer

==== Strings ====
- María Dueñas Fernández (born 2002), Spanish violinist
- Maria Lidka (1914–2013), German violinist
- Maria-Elisabeth Lott (born 1987), German violinist
- Maria Neruda (1840–1920), Czech-Swedish violinist
- Maria Sławek (born 1988), Polish classical violinist
- Maria Kliegel (born 1952), German cellist
- Maria Johansdotter (fl. 1706), Swedish harpist, folk music player and parish clerk
- Maria Korchinska (1895–1979), Russian harpist
- Maria Krushevskaya, Russian harpist
- María Isabel Siewers (born 1950), Argentine guitarist

==== Pianists ====
- Maria Barbara Bach (1684–1720), first wife of composer Johann Sebastian Bach
- Maria Bach (1896–1978), Austrian pianist, violinist, composer and artist
- Maria Belooussova (died 2018), Russian pianist
- Maria Antonietta Picconi (1869–1926), Italian composer and pianist
- Maria Brizzi Giorgi (1775–1812), Italian organist, composer and pianist
- Maria Curcio (1918–2009), Italian pianist
- María de Baratta (1890–1978), Salvadoran composer, pianist, musicologist and folklorist
- María Galli (1872–1960), Swiss-Uruguayan pianist, composer and music teacher
- Maria Grinberg (1908–1978), Russian-Soviet pianist and teacher
- Maria Hester Park (1760–1813), British composer and pianist
- Maria Landes-Hindemith (1901–1987), German pianist
- Maria Lettberg (born 1970), Swedish pianist, resident in Berlin
- Maria Levinskaya, British pianist and educator
- Maria Elisabeth Pembaur (1869–1937), German classical pianist
- Maria Perrotta (born 1974), Italian pianist
- Maria Blom (1914–1994), Dutch carillonneur
- Maria Luigia Pizzoli (1817–1838), Italian pianist and composer
- Maria Rodrigo (1888–1967), Spanish pianist and composer
- Maria Scheepers, Belgian pianist
- Maria Szraiber, Polish pianist and music educator
- Maria Szymanowska (1789–1831), Polish composer and pianist
- Maria Tipo (1931–2025), Italian pianist
- Maria Yudina (1899–1970), Soviet pianist

=== Actresses ===
- María Abradelo (born 1969), Spanish actress
- María Adánez (born 1976), Spanish actress and filmmaker
- Maria Aitken (born 1945), English theatre director, actress and writer
- Maria Alba (1905–1999), Spanish-American actress
- Maria Almeida (born 2004), British actress
- Maria Andergast (1912–1995), German actress
- Maria Andreyeva (1868–1953), Russian/Soviet actress and Bolshevik administrator
- Maria Angelico, Australian actress, writer and producer
- Maria Annus (born 1979), Estonian actress
- Maria Antoniou (born 1964), Swedish actress
- María Armand (1917–2005), Argentine dancer, stage and film actress
- María Aura (born 1982), Mexican actress
- Maria Avdjuško, Estonian actress, film producer, director and screenwriter
- María Azambuya (1944–2011), Uruguayan actress and theatre director
- Maria Babanova (1900–1983), Soviet and Russian actress and pedagogue
- Maria Bakalova (born 1996), Bulgarian actress
- Maria Balcerkiewiczówna (1903–1975), Polish actress
- Maria Bamford (born 1970), American stand-up comedian, actress, and voice actress
- Maria Bard (1900–1944), German actress
- María Barranco (born 1961), Spanish actress
- María Baxa (1946–2019), Serbian actress
- Maria Becker, German actress and director
- Maria Bello (born 1967), American actress and writer
- Maria Antonietta Beluzzi (1930–1997), Italian actress
- Maria Zilda Bethlem (born 1951), Brazilian actress
- María Aurelia Bisutti (1930–2010), Argentine actress
- Maria Blasucci, American actress and comedy writer
- Maria Bogda (1909–1981), Polish actress
- Maria Bonnevie (born 1973), Swedish-Norwegian actress
- María Botto (born 1974), Argentine-Spanish actress
- Maria Britneva (1921–1994), Russian-British actress
- Maria Brockerhoff (born 1942), German actress
- Maria Burton (born 1961), American director, producer and actress
- María Esther Buschiazzo (1889–1971), Argentine actress
- María Gabriela de Faría (born 1992), Venezuelan actress
- María Elisa Camargo (born 1985), Ecuadorian actress and activist
- Maria Fernanda Cândido (born 1974), Brazilian actress and television presenter
- Maria Eduarda de Carvalho (born 1983), Brazilian actress
- Maria Casadevall (born 1987), Brazilian actress
- María Casal (born 1958), Spanish actress
- María Casares (1922–1996), French actress
- Maria Caserini (1884–1969), Italian actress
- María Chacón (born 1991), Mexican actress
- Maria Charles (1929–2023), English actress
- María Esther Corán (1910–1997), Argentine actress
- María Cotiello (born 1982), Spanish actress
- María Corda (1898–1976), Hungarian actress
- Maria Cumani Quasimodo (1908–1995), Italian actress and dancer
- Maria Cuadra (born 1936), Spanish actress
- Maria do Céu Guerra (born 1943), Portuguese actress
- María Cecilia Botero (born 1955), Colombian actress and TV presenter
- María Dalmazzo (born 1983), Colombian actress
- Maria Darling, British voice actress
- Maria Debska (born 1991), Polish actress
- María Alicia Delgado (born 1947), Mexican actress and comedian
- María Denis (1916–2004), Italian actress
- Maria Dinulescu (born 1981), Romanian actress
- Maria Rebecca Davison (1780–1858), British stage actress
- Maria Dizzia (born 1974), American actress
- María Helena Doering (born 1962), Colombian actress
- Maria Dominiani (1913–1993), Italian actress
- Maria Donati (1898–1966), Italian stage, film and television actress
- Maria Dronke (1904–1987), German actress, drama producer and teacher
- Maria das Dores, Portuguese stage actor
- María Douglas (1922–1973), Mexican actress
- Maria-Victoria Dragus, German-Romanian actress
- Maria Dulęba (1881–1959), Polish actress
- María Duval (Argentine actress) (1926–2022), Argentine actress
- Mária Egry (1914–1993), Hungarian actress
- Maria Ehrich (born 1993), German actress
- Maria Eis (1896–1954), Austrian actress
- María Ellingsen (born 1964), Icelandic actress
- Maria Emo (born 1936), Austrian actress
- María Esteve (born 1974), Spanish actress
- Maria Filotti (1883–1956), Romanian actress
- Maria Fiore (1935–2004), Italian actress
- Maria Flor (born 1983), Brazilian actress
- Maria Fein (1892–1965), Austrian actress
- Maria Foka (1916–2001), Greek actress
- Maria Foote (1797–1867), British actress and peeress
- Maria Ford, American actress, model and dancer
- Maria Franck (1771–1847), Swedish actress and drama teacher
- Maria Frau (born 1930), Italian actress
- María de la Fuente (born 1977), Mexican actress
- Maria Friedman (born 1960), British actress
- Maria Furtwängler (born 1966), German physician and actress
- María Galiana (born 1935), Spanish actress
- Maria Gambarelli (1900–1990), Italian-American ballerina and actress
- María Luz Galicia (born 1940), Spanish actress
- María Rosa Gallo (1925–2004), Argentine actress
- María Esther Gamas (1911–2006), Argentine actress
- Maria Garbowska-Kierczyńska (1922–2016), Polish actress
- Maria Gardena (1920–2008), Italian film actress and architect
- Maria Garland (1889–1967), Danish actress
- Maria Gartman (1818–1885), Dutch actress
- María Noel Genovese (born 1943), Uruguayan former model, beauty pageant titleholder and actress
- María Goiricelaya (born 1983), Spanish theater director, playwright, dramaturge, actress, voice specialist and theater researcher
- Maria Gorczyńska (1899–1959), Polish actress
- Maria Chiara Giannetta (born 1992), Italian actress
- Maria Gibbs (1770–1850), British actress
- María Guerrero (1867–1928), Spanish actor and director
- María Alejandra Guzmán (born 1984), Dominican TV and radio hostess, actress and model
- Maria Hart (1923–2012), American actress
- Maria Heiskanen (born 1970), Finnish actress
- Maria Henry, American actress
- María Hervás (born 1986), Spanish actress
- Maria Hofstätter (born 1964), Austrian actress
- Maria Howell, American actress and singer
- Maria Holst (1917–1980), Austrian actress
- Maria Honner (1812–1870), Irish actress
- Maria Hrebinetska (1883–1972), Ukrainian-American actress and soprano
- María Isasi (born 1975), Spanish actress
- María Isbert (1917–2011), Spanish actress
- Maria Jarema (1908–1958), Polish painter, sculptor, scenographer and actress
- Maria Järvenhelmi (born 1975), Finnish actress and singer
- Maria Jacobini (1892–1944), Italian actress
- Maria Joana (born 1986), Brazilian actress
- Maria Johansson (born 1956), Swedish actress
- Maria Kaniewska (1911–2005), Polish actor and director
- Maria Karnilova (1920–2001), American dancer and actress
- Maria Kapnist (1913–1993), Ukrainian film actress
- Maria Kawamura (born 1961), Japanese actress
- Maria Kekkonen, Finnish erotic actress
- Mária Keresztessy (1908–1977), Hungarian actress
- Maria Keogh (born 1982), Irish actress, playwright and musician
- Maria Klenskaja (1951–2022), Estonian actress
- Maria Kimberly (born 1944), American actress
- María Kosti (born 1951), Spanish actress
- Maria Koppenhöfer (1901–1948), German actress
- Mária Kráľovičová (1927–2022), Slovak actress
- Maria Krahn (1896–1977), German actress
- Maria Kraakman (born 1975), Dutch actress
- Maria Kulle (born 1960), Swedish actress
- Maria Kwiatkowsky (1985–2011), German actress
- Maria Lamor, Spanish actress
- Maria Landrock (1923–1992), German actress
- María Ladvenant (1741–1767), Spanish stage actress
- Maria Langhammer (born 1962), Swedish actress
- María Cristina Laurenz, Argentine actress and singer
- Mária Lázár (1895–1983), Hungarian actress
- María León (born 1984), Spanish actress
- Maria Lilina (1866–1943), Russian stage actress
- Maria Loja (1890–1953), German actress
- Maria Lundqvist (born 1963), Swedish actress and comedian
- Maria Lvova-Sinetskaya (1795–1875), Russian stage actress
- Maria Macklin (1733–1781), British actress
- María Mahor (born 1940), Spanish actress
- Maria Malanowicz-Niedzielska (1899–1943), Polish actress
- María Fernanda Malo (born 1985), Mexican actress
- Maria Matos (1886–1952), Portuguese actress and theatre personality
- Maria Matray (1907–1993), German actress
- Maria Martika (1932–2018), Greek actress
- Maria Mauban (1924–2014), French actress
- Maria Maya (born 1981), Brazilian actress
- Maria Mayenzet, American actress
- María Mayor, Spanish actress
- Maria McBane (born 1946), Spanish-American model and actress
- Maria McDermottroe (born 1952/53), Irish actress
- Maria McErlane (born 1957), British actress and comedian
- Maria Melato (1885–1950), Italian actress
- María Mercader (1918–2011), Spanish actress
- Mária Mezei (1909–1983), Hungarian actress
- Maria Michi (1921–1980), Italian actress
- Maria Minogarova (born 1989), Russian actress, model and TV presenter
- Maria Minzenti (1898–1973), Austrian actress
- Maria Vladimirovna Mironova, Soviet and Russian actress
- Maria Mironova (born 1973), Soviet and Russian actress
- María Molins (born 1973), Spanish actress
- Maria Möller (born 1965), Swedish singer, actress, comedian and imitator
- Maria Montez (1912–1951), Dominican actress
- Maria Monti (born 1935), Italian recording artist; actress and singer
- Maria Morena (1929–2003), Brazilian actress
- Maria Nafpliotou (born 1969), Greek actress
- Maria Naganawa (born 1995), Japanese voice actress
- María de Nati (born 1997), Spanish actress
- Maria Nossiter (1735–1759), British actress
- Maria Lluïsa Oliveda Puig (1922–2020), Spanish actress
- Maria Olsen (born 1966), South African film producer and actress
- Maria Rosaria Omaggio (1954–2024), Italian actress and writer
- María Gracia Omegna (born 1984), Chilean actress
- María Onetto (1966–2023), Argentine actress
- Maria Orska (1893–1930), German actress
- Maria Ouspenskaya (1876–1949), Russian actress
- Maria Ozawa (born 1986), Japanese actress
- Maria Palma Petruolo (born 1989), Italian actress
- Maria Palmer (1917–1981), Austrian-born American actress
- Maria Pacôme (1923–2018), French actress and playwright
- María Pedraza (born 1996), Spanish actress
- Maria Perschy (1938–2004), Austrian actress
- Maria Peschek (1953–2023), German comedian, actress and playwright
- Maria Peszek (born 1973), Polish singer, songwriter and actress
- Maria Ploae (born 1951), Romanian actress
- Maria Pia Casilio (1935–2012), Italian actress
- María Jimena Piccolo (born 1985), Argentine actress, singer and radio host
- Maria Pitillo (born 1966), American retired actress
- María Esther Podestá (1896–1983), Argentine actress
- Maria Poezzhaeva (born 1989), Russian actress
- Maria Politseymako (1938–2024), Soviet and Russian actress
- Maria Popistașu (born 1980), Romanian actress
- Maria Pospischil, Czech-German theatre actress
- Maria Pride, Welsh actress
- María Pujalte (born 1966), Spanish actress
- María Fernanda Quiroz (born 1986), Mexican actress
- María Rebeca (born 1970), Mexican actress
- Maria Reisenhofer (1865–1947), Austrian actress
- Maria Richwine (1952–2024), Colombian-born American actress
- María Fernanda Ríos (born 1982), Ecuadorian actor
- María Riquelme, Spanish actress
- Maria Riva (1924–2025), German-American actress
- Maria Rohm (1945–2018), Austrian actress
- Maria Roksanova (1874–1958), Russian stage actress
- Maria Rowohlt (1910–2005), German actress
- Maria Roy (born 1987), Indian actress
- María Rubio (1934–2018), Mexican actress
- María Salerno (born 1948), Spanish actress
- Maria Samarova (1852–1919), Soviet-Russian actress
- Maria Sashide (born 1998), Japanese voice actress
- Maria Schell (1926–2005), Austrian-Swiss actress
- Maria Schrader (born 1965), German actress, screenwriter and director
- Maria Sebaldt (1930–2023), German actress
- Maria Seweryn (born 1975), Polish actress
- Maria Sid (born 1968), Finnish actress
- Maria Sidónio (1920–2007), Portuguese actress, singer and ceramicist
- Maria Sílvia (1944–2009), Brazilian actress
- Maria Sinyavskaya (1762–1829), Russian stage actress
- Maria Shukshina (born 1967), Russian actress
- María Thelma Smáradóttir (born 1993), Icelandic stage and film actress
- Maria Smolnikova (born 1987), Russian actress
- María Socas (1959–2024), Argentine actress
- Maria Soccor, American actor
- Maria Solomou (born 1974), Greek actress
- María Sorté (born 1955), Mexican actress and singer
- Maria Sten (born 1990), Danish actress and filmmaker
- Maria Christina Strömberg (1777–1853), Swedish actress
- Mária Sulyok (1908–1987), Hungarian actress
- Maria Sundbom (born 1975), Swedish actress
- Maria Takagi (born 1978), Japanese pornographic actress
- Maria von Tasnady (1911–2001), Hungarian actress
- Maria Tenazi (1903–1930), Soviet Armenian silent film actress
- Maria Thayer (born 1975), American actress
- Maria Theodorakis, Australian actress
- Maria Tran (born 1985), Vietnamese-Australian actress
- Maria Tsien (1925–2020), American actress
- Maria Tucci (born 1941), American actress
- Maria Vacratsis (born 1955), Canadian actress
- María Valenzuela (born 1956), Argentine actress
- María Valverde (born 1987), Spanish actress
- María Vaner (1935–2008), Argentine actress
- María Vázquez (born 1979), Spanish actress
- Maria Ventura (1888–1954), Romanian-French actress and theatre director
- Maria Venuti (born 1941), Australian actress, entertainer and author
- Maria Alice Vergueiro (1935–2020), Brazilian actress
- Maria Versfelt (1776–1845), Dutch author and stage actress
- Maria Vincent (1929–2006), French actress and singer
- Maria Vinogradova (1922–1995), Russian actress
- Maria Wasti (born 1980), Pakistani actress and model
- Maria Yamamoto (born 1981), Japanese voice actress and singer
- María Fernanda Yepes (born 1980), Colombian actress and model
- Maria Yi (born 1953), Chinese actress from Hong Kong
- Maria Ylipää (born 1981), Finnish singer and actress
- Maria Yumeno, Japanese pornographic actress
- Maria Zakharevich (born 1936), Belarusian actress
- Maria Zankovetska (1854–1934), Ukrainian actress
- Maria Zanoli (1896–1977), Italian actress
- Maria Zelenka (1894–1975), Austrian film actress
- Maria Zhang (born 1999), Chinese actress

=== Writers ===
- María Julia Casanova (1916–2004), American dramatist
- Maria Craig, British telegraphist
- Mária Ďuríčková (1919–2004), Slovak chilldren's book writer
- Maria Firmina dos Reis (1822–1917), Brazilian abolitionist and author
- Maria Fusco, British scholarly expressionist
- Maria Nugent (1771–1834), American-born diarist and art collector in the British Empire
- Maria Aspan, American journalist
- Maria Branwell (1783–1821), mother of the Brontë sisters
- Maria Balinska, American journalist
- Maria Borzunova (born 1995), Russian journalist
- Maria Bartiromo (born 1967), American television personality and author
- Maria Henson (born 1964), American journalist and editor
- Maria Hinojosa (born 1961), Mexican-American journalist
- Maria Houkli (born 1961), Greek journalist and presenter
- M. J. Hyland (born 1968), English novelist
- Maria Maalouf, Lebanese journalist
- María Julia Casanova (1916–2004), American dramatist
- Maria Giovanna Maglie (1952–2023), Italian journalist
- Maria Makeeva, Russian-German journalist
- Maria Memon (born 1983), Pakistani TV journalist and newscaster
- Maria Mercader (1965–2020), American journalist
- Maria Millington Lathbury (1856–1944), classical scholar and archaeological author
- Maria Inês Nassif, Brazilian journalist
- María Julia Oliván, Argentine journalist
- María Patiño (born 1971), Spanish journalist
- Maria Pevchikh (born 1987), Russian investigative journalist
- Maria Polack (1787–1849), English novelist and educator
- Maria Pourchet (born 1980), French novelist
- Maria Jane McIntosh (1803–1878), American novelist
- Maria La Touche (1824–1906), Irish novelist
- Maria McCann, English novelist
- Maria Guarnaschelli (1941–2021), American cookbook editor and publisher
- Maria Fetherstonhaugh (1847–1918), English novelist
- Maria Raha, American journalist
- Maria Rasputin (1898–1977), memoirist
- Maria Ressa (born 1963), Filipino-American author, journalist and Nobel Peace Prize laureate
- María Rey, Spanish journalist
- Maria Hrinchenko (1863–1928), Ukrainian folklorist
- María Romero Cordero (1909–1989), Chilean journalist and film critic
- Maria Rosetti (1819–1893), Romanian journalist and editor
- Maria Rozman (born 1970), Spanish journalist
- Maria Sittel (born 1975), Russian journalist, television presenter and radio host
- María Suárez Toro (born 1948), Puerto Rican journalist
- Maria Thompson Daviess (1872–1924), American novelist
- María Vallejo-Nágera (born 1964), Spanish novelist
- María Cristina Uribe, Colombian journalist and news presenter
- Maria Fusco, British scholarly expressionist
- Maria Hall-Brown, American television producer and journalist
- Maria Johanna von Aachen (1755–1845), German writer
- Maria Alexander, American writer
- Maria Alice Barroso (1926–2012), Brazilian novelist
- Maria Beatrice Alonzi, Italian author and activist
- María de Alva (born 1969), Mexican novelist
- Maria Amelie (born 1985), Russian-born writer and blogger
- María Fernanda Ampuero (born 1976), Ecuadorian writer and journalist
- Maria Barbal (born 1949), Spanish writer
- Maria Carmem Barbosa (1947–2023), Brazilian screenwriter and playwright
- María Enriqueta Camarillo (1872–1968), Mexican poet-novelist, short story writer and translator
- María Cambrils (1878–1939), Spanish writer and feminist
- Maria Campbell (born 1940), Métis author, playwright, broadcaster, filmmaker and elder
- María Cecilia Barbetta (born 1972), Argentine writer
- María Antonieta Collins (born 1952), Mexican journalist and author
- Maria Susanna Cooper (1737–1807), English writer and poet
- Maria Dolors Alibés (1941–2009), Catalan children's writer
- Maria Angelova (1925–1999), Bulgarian Esperantist and author
- Maria Archer (1899–1982), Portuguese writer and activist
- Maria Arrillaga, Puerto Rican writer
- Maria Isabel Barreno (1939–2016), Portuguese writer
- María Esperanza Barrios (1892–1932), Uruguayan writer
- Maria Baiulescu (1860–1941), Romanian author, suffragist, nationalist and feminist leader
- Maria Barnas (born 1973), Dutch writer, poet and artist
- Maria Barrell, writer, poet and playwright
- Maria Isabel Barreno (1939–2016), Portuguese writer
- Mária Bajzek Lukács (born 1960), Hungarian Slovene language writer and university professor
- Maria Beig (1920–2018), German author
- Maria Bellonci (1902–1986), Italian writer
- María Bibiana Benítez (1783–1875), Puerto Rican writer
- Maria Boniecka (1910–1978), Polish author and teacher
- Maria Arena Bell (born 1963), American television writer and freelance writer
- Maria Antonia Braile, Albanian Arbëreshë writer
- Maria Brontë (1783–1821), mother of the Brontë sisters; also one of her daughters (1814–1825)
- María Angélica Bosco (1909–2006), Argentine novelist, translator and essayist
- Maria Elizabeth Budden (c. 1780–1832), English novelist and children's writer
- Maria Aurèlia Capmany (1918–1991), Spanish novelist, playwright and essayist
- María Cadilla (1884–1951), Puerto Rican writer, educator and women's rights activist
- Maria Ângela Carrascalão, East Timorese journalist, author, university teacher and former minister
- Maria Corti (1915–2002), Italian philologist, literary critic and novelist
- María Ernestina Larráinzar Córdoba (1854–1925), Mexican writer and teacher
- Maria Susanna Cummins (1827–1866), American novelist
- María Renée Cura, Argentine geographer, writer and Indologist
- Maria Sonia Cristoff, Argentine writer
- María Guadalupe Cuenca (1790–1854), Bolivian-born Argentine letter writer
- Maria Czapska (1894–1981), Polish writer
- Maria Deraismes (1828–1894), French writer and feminist
- Maria Doolaeghe (1803–1884), Flemish writer
- Maria Elsa da Rocha (1924–2007), Indian writer and poet
- Maria van Daalen (born 1950), Dutch port and writer
- María Vinyals (1875–1942), Spanish publicist and essayist
- Maria Dąbrowska (1889–1965), Polish writer, novelist, essayist, journalist and playwright
- Maria Dadouch, Syrian novelist and writer
- María Esther de Miguel (1929–2003), Argentine writer
- Maria Edgeworth (1768–1849), Anglo-Irish writer of adults' and children's literature
- Maria Espinosa (born 1939), American novelist, poet and translator
- Maria Ernestam (born 1959), Swedish author and journalist
- Maria Eugénia Cunhal, Portuguese writer, feminist and communist
- Maria Eugénia Neto (born 1934), Portuguese-Angolan writer
- María Inés Falconi, Argentine writer and theatre director
- Maria Celestina Fernandes, Angolan children's author
- María Irene Fornés (1930–2018), American writer
- Maria Flechtenmacher (1838–1888), Romanian writer
- Maria Frisé (1926–2022), German journalist and author
- Maria Gainza (born 1975), Argentine art critic and writer
- M. Evelina Galang (born 1961), American novelist
- Maria Galina, Russian writer
- Maria Cristina Giongo (born 1951), Italian journalist and author
- Maria Giacobbe (1928–2024), Italian-Danish writer
- Maria Gill (born 1961), New Zealand children's writer
- Maria Goodavage, American writer and journalist
- María Granata (1920–2026), Argentine author
- Maria Gràcia Bassa i Rocas (1883–1961), Spanish writer, folklorist and professor
- Maria Graham (1785–1842), British travel and children's book writer
- Maria Gripe (1923–2007), Swedish children's writer
- Maria Gustava Gyllenstierna (1672–1737), Swedish countess, writer and translator
- Maria Hack (1777–1844), English writer
- Maria von Heland, Swedish screenwriter, director and author
- Maria Dahvana Headley (born 1977), American author
- Maria Halych (1901–1974), Ukrainian writer
- María Fernanda Heredia (born 1970), Ecuadorian writer, illustrator and graphic designer
- Maria Hummel, American writer
- María Angélica Idrobo (1890–1956), Ecuadorian writer and feminist activist
- María Antonia Iglesias (1945–2014), Spanish writer and journalist
- Maria Ibars i Ibars, Valencian writer and teacher
- María Elvira Arango (born 1967), Colombian journalist
- Maria Janitschek (1859–1927), German writer
- Maria Jane Jewsbury (1800–1833), English writer, poet, literary reviewer
- Maria Jacquemetton, American screenwriter
- María Josefa Acevedo Sánchez (1803–1861), Colombian novelist
- Maria I. Johnston (1835–1921), American author and editor
- Maria Brace Kimball (1852–1933), American educator, elocutionist, writer
- Maria Koleva (born 1940), Bulgarian writer and independent filmmaker
- María Kodama (1937–2023), Argentine writer
- Maria Konnikova, Russian-American writer and psychologist
- Maria Kownacka (1894–1982), Polish writer, translator and editor
- Maria Krüger (1904–1999), Polish children's literature writer
- Maria Susanna Kübler, Swiss cookbook writer
- Maria Kuncewiczowa (1895–1989), Polish writer
- María Hortensia Lacau (1910–2006), Argentine educator and writer
- Maria Lamas (1893–1983), Portuguese writer, feminist and political prisoner
- Maria Laurino, American journalist and writer
- Maria Gabriela Llansol (1931–2008), Portuguese writer and translator
- Maria Liudkevych (born 1948), Ukrainian writer and poet
- Maria Vittoria Ottoboni (1721–1790), Italian stage actress, writer and salonist
- María Rita de Barrenechea y Morante (1757–1795), Spanish writer and playwright
- María Limón, American writer
- María Laria, Cuban-American talk show host, musician, writer and journalist
- Maria Lewis (born 1988), Australian author, screenwriter and commentator
- Maria Lauber (1891–1973), Swiss writer
- Maria Elise Turner Lauder (1833–1922), Canadian author
- Maria Elise Turner Lauder (1833–1922), Canadian writer
- Maria Madalena de Martel Patrício, Portuguese writer
- Maria Majocchi (1864–1917), Italian writer, journalist and publisher
- Maria Evelina de Sousa (1879–1946), Portuguese journalist
- María Emma Mannarelli (born 1954), Peruvian feminist writer, historian, professor
- Maria Alberta Menéres (1930–2019), Portuguese writer
- Maria Cristina Mena (1893–1965), American writer
- Maria Messina (1887–1944), Italian writer
- María Mestayer de Echagüe (1877–1949), gourmet, Spanish writer and entrepreneur
- Maria Benedita Mouzinho de Albuquerque de Faria Pinho (1865–1939), Portuguese writer
- Maria Monk (1816–1849), Canadian author
- Maria Mutch, Canadian writer
- María Nieves y Bustamante (1871–1947), Peruvian writer
- Maria Odulio de Guzman, Filipino teacher, educator, principal, writer and author
- Maria Antònia Oliver Cabrer (1946–2022), Spanish writer
- Maria Ondina Braga (1922–2003), Portuguese writer and translator
- Maria Oshodi (born 1964), British writer and theatre director
- Maria Papayanni (born 1964), Greek author
- Maria Parr (born 1981), Norwegian children's writer
- María Elvira Piwonka (1913–2006), Chilean writer and poet
- Maria Lampadaridou Pothou (1933–2023), Greek novelist, poet and playwright
- Maria Pascoli (1865–1953), Italian writer and poet
- Maria de la Pau Janer (born 1966), Spanish writer
- Maria von Peteani (1888–1960), American writer
- Maria Perosino (1961–2014), Italian author and art historian
- Maria Perekusikhina (1739–1824), Russian writer
- Maria Margaret Pollen (1838–1919), English writer on lace
- Maria Popova (born 1984), Bulgarian writer
- María Cristina Ramos (writer) (born 1952), Argentine writer and educator
- Maria Reva, Canadian writer
- Maria Valéria Rezende (born 1942), Brazilian writer and nun
- Maria Elizabeth Robinson (1775–1818), British writer
- Maria Laura Rocca (1917–1999), Italian actress and writer
- Maria Rundell (1745–1828), British cookery book author
- Maria Rodziewiczówna (1864–1944), Polish writer
- Maria Elizabeth Rothmann (1875–1975), South African writer
- Maria Rosseels (1916–2005), Belgian Catholic writer
- Maria Rozanova (1929–2023), Russian dissident and writer
- Maria Rybakova (born 1973), Russian writer
- Maria Egorovna Rykina (1887–1950), Kazakh author
- Maria de Villegas de Saint-Pierre (1871–1941), Belgian writer
- Maria Samuela, New Zealand writer
- Maria San Filippo, American author and educator
- Maria Sandel (1870–1927), Swedish textile worker, writer, feminist and social critic
- Maria Olga de Moraes Sarmento da Silveira, Portuguese writer and feminist
- María Sáez de Vernet (1800–1858), Argentine writer
- Maria Semple (born 1964), American novelist and screenwriter
- María Seoane (1948–2023), Argentine writer and journalist
- Maria Sophia Schellhammer (1647–1719), German writer and cook
- Maria Shkapskaya (1891–1952), Russian and Soviet writer
- Maria Golovnina (1980–2015), Japanese-Russian journalist
- Maria Navarro Skaranger (born 1994), Norwegian writer
- Mária Szepes (1908–2007), Hungarian author
- Maria Tedeschi (born 1965), Italian writer
- María Nestora Téllez (1828–1890), Mexican writer
- María Cristina Trigo (1935–2014), Bolivian writer and human rights activist
- Maria Trumbull (1785–1805), American published letter writer
- Maria Thomas, American writer
- Maria Tumarkin, Australian cultural historian and writer
- Maria Turtschaninoff (born 1977), Finnish author
- Maria Van Rysselberghe (1866–1959), Belgian writer
- María Esther Vázquez (1937–2017), Argentine writer
- Maria Vega (1898–1980), Russian writer, translator and artist
- Maria Venturi (1933–2024), Italian writer
- Maria Venegas, American writer
- Maria Abbebù Viarengo (born 1949), Ethiopian-born writer living in Italy
- María Argelia Vizcaíno, Cuban activist and writer
- Maria de Wilde (1682–1729), Dutch artist and writer
- María Flora Yáñez (1898–1982), Chilean writer
- Maria Julia Zaleska (1831–1889), Polish writer, prosaist and publicist
- Maria Zhukova (1805–1855), Russian writer
- Maria Judith Zuzarte Cortesão (1914–2007), Portuguese writer

==== Poets ====
- Maria Abdy (1797–1867), English poet
- Maria Àngels Anglada (1920–1999), Spanish poet and novelist
- Maria Baciu (born 1942), Romanian poet
- Maria Banuș (1914–1999), Romanian poet, essayist, prose writer and translator
- Maria Beneyto (1925–2011), Spanish poet
- Maria Louise Eve (1842–1900), American poet
- Maria Berényi (born 1959), Romanian Hungarian historian and poet
- Maria Cabrera i Callís, Spanish poet and writer
- María Calcaño (1906–1956), Venezuelan poet
- Maria do Carmo Abecassis, Mozambican poet
- Maria Briscoe Croker (1875–1962), American poet
- Maria da Cunha (1872–1917), Portuguese lesbian poet and journalist
- María Egual (1655–1735), Spanish poet and dramatist
- Maria da Felicidade do Couto Browne (1800–1861), Portuguese poet
- Maria de Sousa (1939–2020), Portuguese scientist, immunologist, author and poet
- Maria Grech Ganado, Maltese poet and translator
- Maria Gowen Brooks (1794–1845), American poet
- María Gertrudis Hore, Spanish poet
- Maria Grabher-Meyer (1898–1970), Liechtensteiner poet and short story writer
- Maria Holm (1845–1912), Latvian poet and writer
- Maria Howard Weeden (1846–1905), American artist and poet
- Maria Ilnicka (1824–1897), Polish poet and novelist
- Maria James (1793–1868), Welsh-born American poet
- Maria Kazecka (1880–1938), Polish poet and activist
- Maria Konopnicka (1842–1910), Polish poet
- Maria Chessa Lai (1922–2012), Italian poet
- Maria Laina (1947–2023), Greek poet
- Maria White Lowell (1821–1853), American poet, abolitionist
- María Elvira Lacaci (1916–1997), Spanish poet
- Maria Moravskaya (1890–1947), Russian poet, writer, translator and literary critic
- Maria Maddalena Morelli (1727–1800), Italian poet
- María Malla (1918–1995), Catalan poet and activist
- Maria Matios (born 1959), Ukrainian poet, novelist and official
- Maria Mercè Marçal (1952–1998), Catalan poet, professor, writer and translator
- María Josefa Mujía (1812–1888), Bolivian poet
- Maria Mazziotti Gillan (born 1940), American poet
- María Wiesse (1894–1964), Peruvian poet, writer, essayist and anthologist
- María Negroni, Argentine poet, essayist, novelist and translator
- Maria Pawlikowska-Jasnorzewska (1891–1945), Polish poet
- María Piedad Castillo de Levi (1888–1962), Ecuadorian writer, poet, feminist and journalist
- Maria Polydouri (1902–1930), Greek poet
- Maria Poiret, Russian actress, composer, singer and poet
- María Herminia Sabbia y Oribe, Uruguayan poet
- Maria Takolander, Australian poet and literary critic
- Maria Terrone, American poet and writer
- María Torres Frías, Argentine poet
- Maria Tore Barbina (1940–2007), Italian poet and translator
- Maria Riddell (1772–1808), British poet
- María Sabina (1894–1985), Mexican shaman and poet
- Maria Selvaggia Borghini (1656–1731), Italian poet and translator
- Maria Grace Saffery (1773–1858), English Baptist poet and hymn-writer
- Maria Antònia Salvà i Ripoll (1869–1958), Mallorcan poet and translator
- Maria Simointytär, Finnish poet
- Maria Stepanova (poet) (born 1972), Russian poet, novelist and journalist
- María Eugenia Vaz Ferreira (1875–1924), Uruguayan teacher and poet
- María Villar Buceta (1899–1977), Cuban poet, journalist and activist
- Maria White Lowell (1821–1853), American poet and abolitionist
- Maria Petronella Woesthoven (1760–1830), Dutch poet
- Maria Zubova (c. 1749–1799), Russian poet, composer and singer
- Maria van Zuylekom (1759–1831), poet and author

=== Activists and feminists ===
- Maria Hyde Hibbard (1820–1913), American temperance leader
- María Abella (1863–1926), Uruguayan feminist
- Maria Isabel Aboim Inglez (1902–1963), Portuguese teacher, feminist and anti-fascist activist
- María Payá Acevedo (born 1989), Cuban activist
- María Julia Alcoba (born 1938), Uruguayan trade unionist
- María Jesús Alvarado Rivera (1878–1971), Peruvian feminist, activist and educator
- Maria Alyokhina (born 1988), Russian political activist and musician
- María Bellido (1755–1809), Spanish heroine
- Maria Trubnikova (1835–1897), Russian philanthropist and feminist
- Maria Eugenia Bozzoli (born 1935), Costa Rican anthropologist, sociologist and activist
- María Talavera Broussé (1867–1946), American activist
- Maria Buchinger (1916–2010), German therapeutic fasting advocate
- Maria Butina (born 1988), Russian activist and convicted spy
- María Cabrales (1842–1905), Cuban independence activist, revolutionary and nurse
- Maria Cäsar (1920–2017), Austrian political activist
- María Ysabel Cedano, Peruvian lawyer and activist
- Maria Cederschiöld (1856–1935), Swedish journalist and women's rights activist
- Maria Ceres Doyo, Filipino journalist and activist
- Maria Colby, English suffragist
- Maria L. de Hernández (1896–1986), Mexican-American rights activist
- María Julia Hernández (1939–2007), Salvadoran human rights advocate
- Maria Flores, Ibizan abolitionist
- María Isabel Chorobik de Mariani (1923–2018), Argentine human rights activist
- Maria L. Martinez, American labor activist and community advocate
- Maria da Penha (born 1945), Brazilian activist
- Maria Rutkiewicz (1917–2007), Polish communist, editor and radio operator
- Maria Firmina dos Reis (1822–1917), Brazilian abolitionist and author
- Maria Dickin (1870–1951), British social reformer and animal welfare pioneer
- Maria dos Santos Machado (1890–1958), Portuguese teacher, communist and anti-fascist activist
- Maria Dzielska (1942–2018), Polish classical philologist, historian, translator and political activist
- María Espinosa de los Monteros (1875–1946), Spanish women's rights activist
- María Esther Biscayart de Tello (1930–2015), Argentine human rights defender
- Maria Foscarinis (born 1956), American lawyer and activist
- Maria Orsetti (1880–1957), Polish cooperative organizer
- María Galindo (born 1964), Bolivian activist
- María Ester Gatti (1918–2010), Uruguayan activist
- Maria Gorzechowska (1883–1961), Polish teacher, librarian and social activist
- Maria Selina Hale (1864–1951), New Zealand labor activist
- María Herrera Magdaleno, Mexican businesswoman and human rights activist
- Maria Kalesnikava (born 1982), Belarusian musician and pro-democracy activist
- Maria Kim (1891–1944), Korean independence activist
- Maria Exall, British trade unionist
- Maria Kirbasova (1941–2011), Russian human rights activist
- Maria Elizabeth Kirk (1855–1928), temperance advocate and social reformer
- María Teresa Kumar, Colombian-American political rights activist
- Maria Liwo (1916–1984), Polish lawyer and activist
- Maria Motuznaya (born 1994), Russian blogger and activist
- Maria Munir, public speaker and activist
- Maria Antónia Palla (born 1933), Portuguese feminist, journalist and abortion-rights activist
- Maria Pearson (1932–2003), Yankton Dakota activist
- Maria Guardiola (1895–1987), anti-feminist founder of the "Mocidade Portuguese Feminina"
- Maria Lacerda de Moura (1887–1945), Brazilian anarcho-feminist journalist
- Maria Plieseis (1920–2004), Austrian activist
- Maria Pognon (1844–1925), French women's rights activist and freemason
- María Ponce de Bianco (1924–1977), Argentine social activist
- Maria Prestes (1930–2022), Brazilian communist activist
- María Xosé Queizán (born 1939), Spanish feminist
- Maria Verónica Reina (1964–2017), disability rights activist
- Maria Vérone (1874–1938), French feminist and suffragist
- María Reinat-Pumarejo, Puerto Rican peace activist
- Maria Occhipinti (1921–1996), Italian anarcha-feminist
- Maria Rentmeister (1905–1996), German political activist, women's and cultural policy maker
- Maria Roda (1877–1958), Italian-American anarcha-feminist
- Maria Reyes (climate activist), Mexican environmentalist
- Maria Sarungi Tsehai, Tanzanian activist
- Maria Sergeyeva (born 1985), Russian political activist
- Maria Shriver (born 1955), American journalist and activist
- Maria Stenkula (1842–1932), Swedish women's education reformer
- Maria W. Stewart (1803–1879), American teacher, journalist and activist
- Maria Straub (1838–1897), American temperance worker
- Maria Paula Survilla (1964–2020), American professor of ethnomusicology and ethnocultural activist
- Maria Cristina Tavera, Latina artist, curator and activist
- Maria Veleda (1871–1955), Portuguese educator, journalist and activist
- Maria Wachter (1910–2010), political activist against Nazism
- Maria Weston Chapman (1806–1885), American abolitionist
- María Jacinta Xón Riquiac, Maya Kʼicheʼ anthropologist and indigenous rights activist
- Maria Yusuf, Ethiopian activist

=== Scientists ===
- Maria Andrade (born 1958), Cape Verde food scientist
- Maria N. Antonopoulou (born 1946), Greek sociologist
- Maria Elizabeth Fernald (1839–1919), American entomologist
- Maria Alma Solis (born 1956), American entomologist
- Maria Assumpció Català i Poch (1925–2009), Spanish mathematician and astronomer
- María Eugenia Aubet, Spanish archaeologist
- Maria A. Barucci, Italian astronomer
- Maria-Florina Balcan, Romanian-American computer scientist
- Maria Bargh, political scientist in New Zealand
- María Fernanda Beigel (born 1970), Argentine sociologist
- Maria Ludwika Bernhard (1908–1998), Polish classical archaeologist and Greek art specialist
- Maria Paz Bertoglia (born 1978), Chilean epidemiologist
- Mária Bieliková (born 1966), Slovak computer scientist
- María Blasco Marhuenda (born 1965), Spanish molecular biologist
- Maria Bonghi Jovino, Italian archaeologist
- María Luisa Bonet, Spanish computer scientist
- Maria Byrne, marine biologist
- Maria Cherkasova, Russian ecologist and journalist
- Maria Bianca Cita (1924–2024), Italian geologist and paleontologist
- Maria Crawford (1939–2023), American geologist
- Maria Cunitz (1610–1664), German astronomer
- Maria Czaplicka (1884–1921), Polish anthropologist
- Maria da Piedade de Jesus, archaeologist and former Minister of Culture in Angola
- Maria Dahl (1872–1972), German zoologist
- Maria Ragland Davis (1959–2010), American biologist
- Maria de Fátima Agra (born 1952), Brazilian botanist
- Maria De Iorio, Italian biostatistician
- Maria do Carmo Fonseca (born 1959), Portuguese scientist and molecular biologist
- Maria Cardenas-Corona, American geneticist and microbiologist
- Maria Arménia Carrondo (born 1948), Portuguese chemical engineer specializing in crystallography
- María Jimena Duzán (born 1960), Colombian journalist and political scientist
- Maria Dornelas, fellow of the Royal Society of Edinburgh, researcher in biodiversity
- Maria de Fátima Montemor, Portuguese scientist
- Maria Cengia Sambo, Italian lichenologist and botanist
- María Fernanda Ceriani, Argentine biologist
- Maria Manuela Chavez, Portuguese agronomist
- Maria Cristina Facchini, Italian geoscientist
- Maria Fadiman (born 1969), American ethnobotanist
- Maria Nazareth F. da Silva, Brazilian zoologist
- Maria Cristina Ferro (1947–2015), Colombian microbiologist
- Maria Franklin, historical archaeologist
- Maria Fitzgerald (born 1953), British neuroscientist
- Maria L. Gini, Italian and American computer scientist
- Maria Girone, head of CERN openlab
- Maria Hadjicosti, Cypriot archaeologist
- Maria Harrison, plant biologist
- M. Daria Haust, Polish-Canadian pathologist
- Maria Isabel Hylton Scott (1889–1990), Argentine zoologist and malacologist
- Maria Ibáñez, Spanish materials scientist and academic
- Maria Elizabetha Jacson (1755–1829), early 19th-century English botanist and author
- Maria Jasin, American cancer researcher and developmental biologist
- Maria Kavallaris, Australian cancer researcher
- Maria Margaretha Kirch (1670–1720), German astronomer
- Maria Koepcke (1924–1972), German and Peruvian ornithologist
- Maria Klawe, Canadian-American computer scientist
- Maria Klenova (1898–1976), Russian and Soviet marine geologist
- Maria Lehtinen, American neuroscientist
- Maria Leptin, German developmental biologist and immunologist
- Maria Carmela Lico (1927–1985), Italian-Brazilian physiologist
- Maria Lipman, Russian journalist and political scientist
- Maria Löhnis (1888–1964), Dutch biologist
- Maria Antonieta Lorente, geologist
- Maria von Linden (1869–1936), German bacteriologist and zoologist
- Maria Rika Maniates (1937–2011), Canadian musicologist
- Maria Florianivna Makarevych (1906–1989), Soviet botanist and lichenologist
- Maria Makrides, Australian research dietician
- Maria Manaseina (1841–1903), Russian physician
- María Marván Laborde, Mexican sociologist and political scientist
- Maria Márkus (1936–2017), Polish sociologist and philosopher
- Maria McNamara, Irish paleontologist
- Maria Sybilla Merian (1647–1717), German naturalist and artist
- Maria Mies (1931–2023), German professor of sociology and author
- Maria Mitchell (1818–1889), American astronomer
- Maria Molina (born 1987), American television meteorologist
- Maria Manuel Mota, Portuguese scientist, researcher and immunologist
- Mária Mottl, Hungarian speleologist and paleontologist
- Maria Musoke, Ugandan information scientist
- Maria New, American geneticist
- María Nieves García-Casal, Spanish scientist/nutritionist
- Maria Olech, Polish mycologist and lichenologist
- Maria Ovsiankina (1898–1993), Russian-German-American psychologist
- Maria Orłowska (born 1951), Polish computer scientist
- Maria Pallotta-Chiarolli, Australian gender and sexuality researcher
- María Páramo, Colombian geologist
- Maria Petrou (1953–2012), AI researcher
- Maria Isaura Pereira de Queiróz (1918–2018), Brazilian sociologist
- Maria Pereira, Portuguese bioengineering scientist
- Maria Ruth B. Pineda-Cortel, Philippine scientist
- Maria Pogonowska (1897–2009), Polish-Israeli scientist
- Maria Matilde Principi (1915–2017), Italian entomologist
- Maria Prokhorova (1903–1993), Russian biologist
- Maria Léa Salgado-Labouriau (1931–2013), Brazilian scientist
- Maria Serna, Spanish computer scientist
- Maria Seton, Australian geologist
- Maria Skalińska (1890–1977), Polish botanist
- Maria Spencer, petroleum geologist
- Maria Stamatopoulou, Greek archaeologist
- Maria Stephan, American political scientist
- Maria Floriani Squarciapino (1917–2003), Italian classical archaeologist
- Maria Tallant Owen (1825–1913), American botanist
- Maria C. Tamargo, Cuban-American scientist
- Mária Telkes (1900–1995), Hungarian-American scientist and inventor
- Maria Teohari (1885–1975), Romanian astronomer
- Maria Teschler-Nicola (born 1950), Austrian human biologist, anthropologist and ethnologist
- Maria Thompson, American scientist and academic administrator
- Maria Kovacs, American psychologist
- Maria Moltzer (1874–1944), Dutch-Swiss psychologist and psychotherapist
- Maria Tonelli-Rondelli, Italian biologist
- Maria P. P. Root (born 1955), American psychologist
- Mária Török (1925–1998), French-Hungarian psychoanalyst
- María Amelia Torres (1934–2011), Argentine botanist
- Maria Helena Souza Patto, Brazilian psychologist
- Maria Uriarte, ecologist
- Maria Jesús Uriz Lespe, Spanish marine biologist
- Maria Van Kerkhove (born 1977), American infectious disease epidemiologist
- Maria Eulália Vares, Brazilian mathematical statistician and probability theorist
- María Daniela Velasco (born 1993), Venezuelan model, anthropologist and beauty pageant titleholder
- María Elisa Velázquez Gutiérrez, Mexican anthropologist
- Maria Wähnl (1908–1989), Austrian astronomer
- Maria von Wedemeyer Weller (1924–1977), American computer scientist
- Maria Wilman (1867–1957), South African botanist
- Maria Yazdanbakhsh, Dutch immunologist
- Maria Zambon, British virologist
- Maria Zemankova (born 1951), American computer scientist
- Maria Zhilova (1870–1934), Russian astronomer
- Maria Zuber (born 1958), American astronomer

==== Physicists ====
- Maria Angela Ardinghelli (1730–1825), Italian mathematician, physicist and translator
- Maria Calbi, Argentine American physicist
- Maria V. Chekhova, Russian-German physicist
- Maria Dworzecka (1941–2022), Polish-American computational nuclear physicist and physics educator
- Maria Fidecaro (1930–2023), Italian physicist
- Maria Gatu Johnson, Swedish-American plasma physicist
- M. Cristina Marchetti (born 1955), American physicist
- Maria Goeppert Mayer (1906–1972), German-American theoretical physicist
- Maria Antonietta Loi, Italian physicist
- Maria Lugaro, Italian astrophysicist and researcher
- Maria Orbeli, Soviet physicist of Armenian origin
- Maria Novella Piancastelli, Italian physicist
- Maria Spiropulu, Greek physicist
- Maria Strømme (born 1970), Norwegian physicist

==== Chemists ====
- Maria Asensio, Spanish-Argentine physical chemist
- Maria Baronova (born 1984), Russian chemist
- Maria Baumgartner (born 1952), Austrian chemist
- Maria Bakunin (1873–1960), Italian chemist and geologist
- Maria Christina Bruhn (1732–1808), Swedish chemist and inventor
- María Escudero-Escribano (born 1983), Spanish chemist
- Maria Falkenberg, Swedish biochemist
- Maria Forsyth, Australian chemist professor
- Maria Glazovskaya (1912–2016), Russian geochemist
- Maria Kobel (1897–1996), German chemist
- Maria-Regina Kula (born 1937), German biochemist
- Maria Lipp (1892–1966), German chemist
- Maria-Elisabeth Michel-Beyerle (born 1935), German chemist
- María Orosa (1892–1945), Philippine chemist
- Maria Schilder (1898–1975), German malacologist and chemist
- Mária Wollemann, Hungarian biochemist
- Maria Zaharescu (born 1938), Romanian chemist

=== Engineers and inventors ===
- Maria Artini (1894–1951), Italian engineer
- Maria Elisabeth Bes (1882–1938), Dutch chemical engineer, city councillor in Delft
- Maria Amélia Chaves (1911–2017) Portuguese civil engineer
- Maria Flytzani-Stephanopoulos (1950–2019), American chemical engineer
- Maria Wanda Jastrzębska (1924–1988), Polish electronics engineer, taught at Silesian University of Technology and Opole University of Technology
- Maria Antonietta Perino, Italian aerospace engineer
- Maria Start, British automata maker and restorer
- Maria Prandini (born 1969), Italian electrical engineer
- Maria E. Beasley (1836–1913), American inventor
- Maria Vittoria Salvetti, Italian aerospace engineer
- Maria Skyllas-Kazacos (born 1951), Australian chemical engineer
- Maria Romell, Swedish inventor
- Maria Watkins (1918–2010) defense electronics engineer, lecturer and President of the Women's Engineering Society
- María Inés Valla (born 1956), Argentine engineer
- Maria Yang, American mechanical engineer

=== Religious figures ===
==== Saints, preachers missionaries, nuns and religious sisters ====
- Maria Josefa Alhama y Valera (1893–1983), Spanish religious sister
- Maria Bertilla Boscardin (1888–1922), Italian Roman Catholic saint
- Maria Bernarda Bütler (1848–1924), Franciscan missionary
- Maria Bolognesi (1924–1980), Italian mystic
- Marià Paieres i Borràs (1769–1823), Spanish missionary to the Americas
- María de Bohórquez (1533–1559), Spanish Protestant
- María de Cazalla, Spanish mystic
- Maria Candida of the Eucharist (1884–1949), Italian Discalced Carmelite
- Maria Crocifissa Curcio (1877–1957), Italian Catholic religious sister
- Maria Ludovica De Angelis (1880–1962), Italian Catholic religious sister
- Maria Raffaella Cimatti (1861–1945), Italian Roman Catholic nun
- Maria Cook, American University preacher
- Maria Catharina Daemen (1787–1858), mother Magdalena, Dutch nun
- Maria Micaela Desmaisieres (1809–1865), Spanish Roman Catholic professed religious
- Maria Duran (1710–?), Portuguese nun
- Maria Dyer (1803–1846), British missionary
- María Guggiari Echeverría (1925–1959), Paraguayan Discalced Carmelite
- Maria Gargani (1892–1973), Italian member of the Secular Franciscan Order
- Maria Hartmann (1798–1853), German-born Moravian missionary
- Maria Jannson, Dean of Waterford since 2011
- Maria Anne Hirschmann (1926–2024), American author and evangelist
- Maria Crescentia Höss (1682–1744), religious sister and saint
- Maria Hueber (1653–1705), Tyrolean religious sister
- Maria Innocentia Hummel (1909–1946), German Franciscan sister
- Maria Jepsen (born 1945), German bishop
- Maria Restituta Kafka (1894–1943), Austrian nurse, religious sister and martyr
- Maria Karłowska (1865–1935), Polish Roman Catholic professed religious
- Maria Franciszka Kozłowska (1862–1921), founder of Christian religious movement in Poland
- Maria Katharina Kasper (1820–1898), German nun and saint of Catholic Church
- Maria Katsaris (1953–1978), figure within the People's Temple
- Maria Domenica Mazzarello (1837–1881), Italian Roman Catholic saint
- Maria McAuley (1847–1919), American missioner
- Maria Antonina Kratochwil (1881–1942), Polish Roman Catholic religious sister and martyr
- Maria Aloysia Löwenfels (1915–1942), German religious sister
- Maria Llorença Llong (1463–1539), Spanish nun
- Maria Thaddäus von Trautmannsdorff (1761–1819), Austrian cardinal
- Maria Domenica Lazzeri (1815–1848), Italian mystic
- Maria Laura Mainetti (1939–2000), Italian Catholic sister
- Maria Domenica Mantovani (1862–1934), Beatified Italian nun
- Maria Maddalena Martinengo (1687–1737), Italian Roman Catholic nun
- María de las Maravillas de Jesús (1891–1974), Spanish nun and saint
- Maria De Mattias (1805–1866), Italian Roman Catholic saint
- Maria Merkert (1817–1872), German Roman Catholic professed religious
- Maria Newell (1794–1831), English missionary, teacher and translator
- Maria Assunta Pallotta (1878–1905), Italian nun
- Maria Costanza Panas (1896–1963), Italian nun and Venerated Catholic
- Maria Pierina De Micheli (1890–1945), Italian Roman Catholic sister
- Maria Angela Picco (1867–1921), Italian Roman Catholic nun
- Maria Adeodata Pisani (1806–1855), Maltese beautified nun
- María de la Purísima Salvat Romero (1926–1998), Spanish Roman Catholic nun
- María Beatriz del Rosario Arroyo (1884–1957), Filipino Dominican nun
- Maria Louisa Bustill (1853–1904), American Quaker schoolteacher
- Maria Xaveria Perucona (died 1709), Italian composer and nun
- Maria Chiara Nanetti (died 1900), Italian religious sister, martyr and saint
- María Natividad Venegas de la Torre (1868–1959), Mexican Roman Catholic nun
- María Rafols Bruna (1781–1853), Spanish nun
- Maria Raggi, 16th-century Catholic nun
- Maria Elisabetta Renzi (1786–1859), Italian Catholic religious sister
- Maria Ripamonti (1909–1954), Italian Roman Catholic and professed religious
- Maria Crocifissa di Rosa (1813–1855), Italian Roman Catholic saint
- Maria Rowntree (1848–1931), English Quaker
- Maria Francesca Rossetti (1827–1876), English author and nun
- Maria Giuseppa Rossello (1811–1880), Italian Catholic saint
- Maria Roszak (1908–2018), Polish nun and supercentenarian
- Maria Gabriella Sagheddu (1914–1939), Italian nun
- María Josefa Sancho de Guerra (1842–1912), Spanish Roman Catholic nun
- Maria Katherina Scherer (1825–1888), Beautified Swiss nun
- Maria Schininà (1844–1910), Italian Roman Catholic nun
- Maria Scrilli (1825–1889), Italian religious sister
- Maria Sullivan, Australian nun
- Maria Soledad Torres y Acosta (1826–1887), Spanish Roman Catholic professed religious
- Maria Torribia (died 1175), Spanish farmer and saint
- María Vela y Cueto (1561–1617), Spanish Cistercian nun
- Maria Duval, Amulet Supreme, pseudonym of Carolina Maria Gambia
- Maria Valtorta (1897–1961), Italian Catholic writer and mystic
- María de Jesús Velarde (1925–2021), Spanish nun
- Maria Velotti (1826–1886), Italian religious sister
- Maria Silbert (1866–1936), Austrian spiritualist medium
- Maria Fortunata Viti (1826–1922), Beautified Italian nun
- Maria Woodworth-Etter (1844–1924), American Evangelist and Faith Healer
- Maria Therese von Wüllenweber (1833–1907), German religious sister
- Zuster Maria-Jozefa (1883–1961), Belgian nun, educator and poet

==== In Islam ====
- Maria al-Qibtiyya (died 637), Muhammad's concubine or thirteenth wife
- Maria Ulfah (born 1955), Indonesian Quran reciter

==== Religious scholars and theologians ====
- Maria Butinova (1920–2007), Soviet and Russian ethnographer, historian and religious scholar
- Maria Massi Dakake, American scholar of Islamic studies
- Maria Darmstädter (1892–1943), German religious scholar and Holocaust victim
- María Pilar Aquino, Mexican Catholic feminist theologian

=== Artists ===
- Maria Adelborg (1849–1940), Swedish artist
- Maria Alos (1973–2011), artist
- Maria Helena Andrés (born 1922), Brazilian artist
- Mária Balážová (born 1956), Slovak artist
- Maria Maddalena Baldacci (1718–1782), Italian artist
- Maria Geertruida Barbiers (1801–1879), Dutch painter
- Maria Chona, Native American weaver
- Maria Caspar-Filser (1878–1968), German painter
- Maria Cecilia Adelaide Bass (1897–1948), Swiss artist
- Maria Barreira (1914–2020), Portuguese neorealist sculptor
- Maria Bell (1755–1825), English painter
- Maria Bujakowa (1901–1985), Polish sculptor
- María Eugenia de Beer (died 1652), Spanish chalcographer
- María Berrío, Colombian artist
- Maria Llimona i Benet (1894–1985), Catalan sculptor
- Maria Biljan-Bilger, Austrian ceramicist, sculptor and textile artist
- María Blanchard (1881–1932), Spanish artist
- Maria Kristina Kiellström (1744–1798), Swedish silk worker
- Maria Bofill (1937–2021), Spanish ceramicist
- Maria Ghezzi (1927–2021), Italian illustrator
- María Brito, Cuban-American artist
- Maria Brodacka (1904–1991), Polish painter
- Maria Matilda Brooks, American painter
- Maria Callani (1778–1803), Italian 18th-century portrait painter active in Parma
- María Fernanda Cardoso (born 1963), Colombian contemporary artist
- Maria Carowsky (1723–1793), Swedish artist
- Maria Vittoria Cassana (died 1711), Italian artist
- Maria Emilia Castagliola (born 1946), Cuban artist
- Maria A. Chalon (1800–1867), British painter
- Maria Chambers-Bilibin (1874–1962), Russian-English artist
- Maria Rivka Chwoles-Lichtenfeld (1923–2017), Israeli artist
- Maria Giovanna Clementi (1692–1761), Italian artist
- Maria Cosway (1760–1838), Italian-British artist
- María Fernanda Cuartas (born 1967), Colombian painter
- Maria de Dominici (1645–1703), Maltese artist and sculptor
- Maria Lvovna Dillon (1858–1932), Russian sculptor
- María de Mater O'Neill, Puerto Rican artist, designer and educator
- María Dávila, Spanish painter
- Maria de Abarca, Spanish painter
- Maria de Grebber (1602–1680), Dutch Golden Age painter
- Maria Posobchuk (1890–1992), Ukrainian weaver
- Maria Oakey Dewing (1845–1927), American painter
- Maria Dulębianka (1861–1919), Polish artist
- Maria Dunin (1899–1986), Polish painter
- Maria Eichhorn (born 1962), German artist based in Berlin
- Maria Ney (1890–1959), German cabaret artist
- Maria Margaretha la Fargue (1738–1813), Dutch artist
- Maria Farmer (born 1969), American visual artist
- Maria Flaxman (1768–1833), British artist
- Marià Fortuny (1838–1874), Spanish painter
- Maria Angelica Razzi, Italian sculptor
- Maria Faydherbe (1587–1643), Flemish sculptor
- Maria Fragoudaki, American painter
- Maria Friberg (born 1966), Swedish artist
- Maria Gaspar, American artist and educator
- Maria Oriana Galli Bibiena (1656–1749), Italian painter
- Maria Gażycz (1860–1935), Polish artist
- Maria Giberne (1802–1885), French-English artist and convert to Roman Catholicism
- Maria Gugelberg von Moos (1836–1918), Swiss artist
- Maria Aparecida Godoy, Brazilian comic artist
- Maria Johanna Görtz (1783–1853), Swedish artist
- Maria Herrmann-Kaufmann (1921–2008), Swiss painter
- Maria C. Hakewill (died 1842), British painter and writer
- Maria Hinze, German visual artist
- Maria Elizabeth Holland (1836–1878), South African botanical artist
- Maria Ida Adriana Hoogendijk (1874–1942), Dutch artist
- Maria Hupfield, Canadian artist
- María Juana Hurtado de Mendoza (died 1818), Spanish artist
- Maria Jacoby (1900–1990), Luxembourgish painter
- Maria von Kalckreuth (1857–1897), German painter
- Maria Keil (1914–2012), Portuguese artist
- Maria Korporal, visual artist
- Maria Kozic, Australian artist
- Maria Lalić, British artist
- Maria Lalou, Greek artist
- Maria Lassnig (1919–2014), Austrian artist
- Maria Lynch, Brazilian artist
- Maria Maragkoudaki, Greek artist
- María Evelia Marmolejo (born 1958), Colombian artist
- Maria Marshall, English-Swiss artist
- Maria Manton (1910–2003), French painter
- Maria Martinetti (1864–1921), Italian painter
- María Esther Mendy (1910–?), Uruguayan painter
- Maria Molin, Italian artist
- Maria Marc (1876–1955), German painter
- Maria Moninckx (1673–1757), Dutch artist
- Maria Morris Miller (1813–1875), Canadian artist
- María Roësset Mosquera (1882–1921), Portuguese-born Spanish painter
- Maria Giacomina Nazari (1724–?), Italian artist
- Maria Nordman, American sculptor
- Maria Nepomuceno (born 1976), Brazilian artist
- Maria Olsen (artist) (1945–2014), New Zealand painter and sculptor
- Maria Jacoba Ommeganck (1760–1849), Flemish painter
- Maria van Oosterwijck (1630–1693), Dutch artist
- Maria Margaretha van Os (1779–1862), Dutch painter
- Maria Pixell (died 1811), British painter
- Maria Łunkiewicz-Rogoyska (1895–1967), Polish painter
- Maria Ormani (1428–1471), Italian artist
- Maria Lídia Magliani, Brazilian painter, designer, engraver, illustrator, costume designer and set designer
- Maria Perego (1923–2019), Italian animation artist
- Maria Panínguakʼ Kjærulff, Greenlandic artist
- Maria Pascual Alberich (1933–2011), Spanish draftsperson and comics artist
- Maria Peale (1787–1866), American painter
- Maria Petschnig, Austrian artist
- Maria Katharina Prestel (1747–1794), German artist
- Maria E. Piñeres (born 1966), Colombian-born American artist
- Maria Prymachenko (1908–1997), Ukrainian artist
- Maria Qamar (born 1991), Pakistani-Canadian pop artist
- Maria Raevskaia-Ivanova (1840–1912), Ukrainian artist
- Maria Röhl (1801–1875), Swedish artist
- Maria D. Robinson (1840–1920), Irish-British painter
- Maria Rønning (1741–1807), Norwegian-Faroese artist
- Maria Rudenko (1915–2003), Ukrainian artist and folklorist
- Maria Rusescu (born 1936), Romanian painter
- Maria Rużycka (1905–1961), Polish painter
- Maria Rudnitskaya (1916–1983), Russian artist
- Maria Igorevna Safronova (born 1979), Russian artist
- Maria Domenica Scanferla (1726–1763), Italian artist
- Maria Antónia Siza (1940–1973), Portuguese artist
- Maria Roosen (born 1957), Dutch sculptor and illustrator
- Maria Schalcken (1645–1699), Dutch artist
- Maria Slavona (1865–1931), German painter
- Maria Adeline Alice Schweistal (1864–1950), Belgium-born Dutch artist
- Maria Spanò (1843–1880), Italian painter
- Maria Kleschar-Samokhvalova (1915–2000), Russian painter
- Maria Serebriakova (born 1965), Russian artist
- Maria Simonds-Gooding (born 1939), Indian-born Anglo-Irish artist
- Maria Spilsbury (1776–1820), British artist
- Maria Suppioti Ceroni (1730–?), Italian artist
- Maria Judson Strean (1865–1949), American painter
- Maria Machteld van Sypesteyn (1724–1774), Dutch artist
- Maria Geertruida Snabilie (1776–1838), Dutch painter
- Mária Spoločníková, Slovak art renovator and painter
- Maria Tassaert, Flemish painter
- Maria Taniguchi, Filipino artist
- Maria Temnitschka (born 1961), Austrian artist
- Maria Tesselschade Visscher (1594–1649), Dutch artist
- Maria Felice Tibaldi (1707–1770), Italian artist
- Maria Uhden (1892–1918), German artist
- Maria Verelst (1680–1744), British artist
- Maria Weenix (1697–1774), Dutch artist
- Maria Helena Vieira da Silva (1908–1992), Portuguese-French artist
- Maria Vigeland (1903–1983), Norwegian painter and sculptor
- Maria Elisabeth Vogel (1746–1810), German painter
- Maria Vos (1824–1906), Dutch painter
- Maria Dorothea Wagner (1719–1792), German painter
- Maria Eugênia Villarta (born 1958), Brazilian plastic artist and former model
- Maria Widebeck (1858–1929), Swedish textile artist and illustrator
- Maria Withoos (1663–after 1699), Dutch artist
- Maria Viktorovna (born 1986), YouTuber and ASMR artist
- Maria Wodzińska (1819–1896), Polish artist
- Maria Wiik (1853–1928), Finnish painter
- Maria Torrence Wishart (1893–1982), Canadian medical illustrator and the founder of the University of Toronto's Art as Applied to Medicine program
- Maria Wolfram (born 1961), Finnish artist
- Maria Yakunchikova (1870–1902), Russian artist
- Maria Zacchè, Italian artist
- Maria Zambaco (1843–1914), British artist and model of Greek descent
- Maria Elisabeth Ziesenis (1744–1796), German artist
- Maria Zubreeva (1900–1991), Russian artist

==== Photographers ====
- Maria Austria (1915–1975), Austrian-Dutch photographer
- Maria Bordy, Soviet news photographer
- Maria Eisner (1909–1991), Italian-American photographer, photo editor and photo agent
- Maria Hille (1827–1893), Dutch photographer
- Maria LaYacona, American photographer
- Maria Mochnacz, British video director and photographer
- Maria Svarbova (born 1988), Slovak photographer
- Maria Tesch (1850–1936), Swedish photographer
- Maria Varela (born 1940), American photographer and teacher

==== Art historians, collectors scholars and relatives of artists ====
- Maria Thins (c. 1593–1680), mother-in-law of painter Johannes Vermeer
- Maria Almas-Dietrich (1892–1971), German art dealer
- Maria Gough (born 1961), art historian
- Maria Hoofman (1776–1845), 19th-century art collector from the Netherlands
- Maria de Knuijt, Dutch art patron
- María Tomasa Palafox, Marquise of Villafranca (1780–1835), Spanish art patron and muse
- Maria Kusche, Spanish art historian
- Maria Weigert Brendel (1902–1994), German classical art expert
- Maria Lind, Swedish art historian, art critic and curator
- Maria Poprzęcka, Polish art historian
- Maria Dietsch, 19th-century German woman
- Maria Reidelbach (born 1956), American art historian
- Maria Reynolds (1768–1828), wife of James Reynolds

=== Legal professionals ===
==== Judges ====
- Maria Lourdes Afiuni, Venezuelan judge
- Maria Araújo Kahn (born 1964), American judge
- Maria Barnaby Greenwald (1940–1995), American judge
- Maria Berkenkotter (born 1962/1963), American judge
- Maria Elisabeth Geyser (1912–2008), German judge
- Maria Gurowska (1915–1998), Polish judge
- Maria Farida Indrati (born 1949), Indonesian judge
- María Eugenia Manaud (born 1949), Chilean judge
- Maria Rita Saulle (1935–2011), Italian judge
- Maria Lourdes Sereno (born 1960), de facto Chief Justice of the Philippines (2012–2018)
- Maria de Fátima Coronel, former president of the Supreme Court of Cape Verde
- María Romilda Servini (born 1936), Argentine lawyer and judge
- Maria Filomena Singh (born 1966), Filipino judge
- Maria Yuen (born 1953), Hong Kong judge
- Maria Zukogi, Nigerian judge

==== Lawyers ====
- Maria Pellegrina Amoretti (1756–1787), Italian lawyer
- Maria Bashir, Afghan lawyer
- María Eugenia Brizuela de Ávila (born 1956), Salvadoran lawyer
- María Lacunza Ezcurra (1900–1984), Spanish pioneer lawyer
- Maria Ludkin (born 1965), British lawyer
- María Pardo, Chilean lawyer
- Maria Pagan, American attorney and trade representative
- Mária Patakyová, Slovak lawyer, Ombudsman (2017–2020)
- Maria Pallante (born 1964), 12th United States Register of Copyrights and attorney
- Maria Staniszkis (1911–2004), Polish lawyer
- María Cecilia Ubilla, Chilean lawyer
- Maria Voce (1937–2025), Italian lawyer

=== Heath professionals ===
==== Nurses ====
- Maria Abbey (1816–1903), nurse during the American Civil War
- Maria Stencel (1900–1985), Polish nurse
- Maria Stromberger (1898–1957), Austrian nurse
- Maria Palmira Tito de Morais, Portuguese nurse, nursing teacher and activist

==== Pharmacists, apothecaries and pharmacologists ====
- Maria Abbracchio, Italian pharmacologist
- Maria Andreae (1550–1631), German pharmacist
- Maria Dauerer (1624–1688), Swedish pharmacist (apothecary)
- María Amparo Pascual López, Cuban pharmacologist and medical doctor
- Maria Tecla Civit Llobera (1683–1761), Catalan manager and healer
- Maria Valentina Tonelli (1939–2016), Italian pharmacist, essayist and author

==== Doctors ====
- María Belón (born 1966), Spanish physician and motivational speaker
- Maria Bitner-Glindzicz (1963–2018), British physician and professor of genetics
- Maria Kovrigina (1910–1995), Russian physician and Soviet minister of health
- Maria Oliva-Hemker, Cuban-American pediatrician
- Maria Luisa Escolar, Colombian pediatrician
- Maria Cicherschi Ropală (1881–1973), Romanian doctor and professor
- Maria Cuțarida-Crătunescu (1857–1919), first female doctor in Romania
- Maria Augusta Generoso Estrela, Brazilian physician
- Maria Fischer-Slyzh (1922–2012), Ukrainian doctor and philanthropist
- Maria Kalapothakes (1859–1941), first woman doctor in Greece
- Maria Neira, Spanish medical doctor, international civil servant and diplomat
- Maria Teodora Pimentel (1865–1948), first female doctor in the Azores, Portugal
- Maria Petraccini (died 1791), Italian anatomist and physician
- Maria Fjodorovna Zibold (1849–1939), Russian and Serbian physician
- Maria Siemionow (born 1950), Polish surgeon

==== Midwives ====
- Maria Branco (1842–1887), Azorean midwife
- Maria Nubsen (1780–1852), Norwegian midwife

==== Public health ====
- Maria Rosario Vergeire, Philippine public-health official
- María Seguí Gómez (born 1967), Spanish physician and Public Health expert
- Maria Freire, American health executive
- Maria Isabel Wittenhall van Zeller (1749–1819), Portuguese vaccination pioneer

==== Other health professionals ====
- Maria Gomori (1920–2021), Canadian family therapist
- María Cordero Hardy (born 1932), Puerto Rican physiologist

=== Mathematicians ===
- Maria Gaetana Agnesi (1718–1799), Italian mathematician and philanthropist
- Maria Bruna, Spanish applied mathematician
- Maria-Carme Calderer (born 1951), American mathematician
- Maria Andrea Casamayor (1720–1780), Spanish mathematician and teacher
- Maria Chudnovsky (born 1977), mathematician and engineer
- Maria Cibrario (1905–1992), Italian mathematician
- Maria Deijfen, Swedish mathematician
- Maria Emelianenko (born 1979), Russian-American mathematician
- María J. Esteban (born 1956), French mathematician
- María Falk de Losada, American-born Colombian mathematician
- Maria Gordina (born 1968), Russian-American mathematician
- Maria Gramegna, Italian mathematician
- Maria Hasse (1921–2014), German mathematician
- Maria Heep-Altiner (born 1959), German mathematician
- Maria Hoffmann-Ostenhof (born 1947), Austrian mathematician
- Maria Korovina (born 1962), Russian mathematician
- Maria Silvia Lucido (1963–2008), Italian mathematician
- María Manzano (born 1950), Spanish mathematician
- Maria Laura Moura Mouzinho Leite Lopes, Brazilian mathematician
- Maria Pastori (1895–1975), Italian mathematician
- Maria Assunta Pozio (died 2018), Italian mathematician
- Maria Reiche (1903–1998), Peruvian archaeologist, mathematician and technical translator
- Maria E. Schonbek, Argentine-American mathematician
- Maria Aparecida Soares Ruas (born 1948), Brazilian mathematician
- Maria Cristina Villalobos, American applied mathematician

=== Historians ===
- Maria Bartola, early indigenous historian of Mexico
- Maria Bogucka (1929–2020), Polish historian
- Maria Bucur (born 1968), Romanian-American historian
- Maria Cristina Cavalcanti de Albuquerque (born 1943), Brazilian novelist, historian and psychiatrist
- Maria Dembińska (1916–1996), Polish historian
- Maria Cristina Didero, Italian curator, historian and author
- Maria Dowling (1955–2011), British historian
- Maria Hayward, English historian of costume
- Maria Mavroudi, American historian
- Maria Mesner, Austrian historian and archivist
- Maria Misra, historian and academic
- Maria Nielsen, Danish historian and headmistress
- Maria Adriana Prolo (1908–1991), Italian historian
- Maria Rentetzi, Greek historian of science
- María Rostworowski (1915–2016), Peruvian historian
- María Jesús Rubiera Mata (1942–2009), Spanish historian
- Mária Schmidt (born 1953), Hungarian historian and university lecturer
- Maria Tippett, Canadian historian
- Maria Todorova (born 1949), Bulgarian historian
- Maria Vlier (1828–1908), Dutch Surinamese teacher and history textbook author

=== Philosophers ===
- Maria Aloni, Italian philosopher
- Maria Baghramian (born 1954), Irish philosopher
- María Pascuala Caro Sureda (1768–1827), Spanish philosopher
- Maria Carla Galavotti, Italian philosopher of science
- Maria Kokoszyńska-Lutmanowa (1905–1981), logician, philosopher of language and epistemologist
- Maria Lugones (1944–2020), American philosopher
- Maria Rakhmaninova (born 1985), Russian philosopher
- María Zambrano (1904–1991), Spanish philosopher

=== Other academics ===
- Maria T. Accardi, American academic
- Maria Strick (1577–1631), Dutch calligrapher
- Maria Szécsi (1914–1984), Austrian economist
- Maria Barmich (1934–2023), Russian linguist
- Maria Bittner, American linguist
- María Guðjónsdóttir, Icelandic academic
- Maria Mayerchyk (born 1971), Ukrainian feminist academic
- Maria Timpanaro Cardini (1890–1978), Italian classical philologist
- Maria Elvira Méndez Pinedo, Icelandic academic
- Maria Ossowska (1896–1974), Polish academic
- Maria Kublitz-Kramer, German literary scholar
- Maria Augusta Nóbrega (1929 –2007), Portuguese folklorist and researcher
- Maria Kuhnert-Brandstätter (1919–2011), Austrian thermomicroscopy researcher
- Maria LaRosa (born 1976), American meteorologist
- Maria Irene Ramalho, Portuguese academic
- María Soengas, Spanish immunologist and academic
- Maria Barmich (1934–2023), Russian linguist
- María Sefidari, Spanish specialist in digital culture, Chair of Wikimedia Foundation Board
- María Catrileo (born 1944), Mapuche linguist
- Maria Cust (1862/1863–1958), English geographer
- Maria das Dores de Oliveira, Brazilian linguist
- Maria Dobrowolska (1895–1984), Polish geographer
- Maria Helena de Moura Neves (1931–2022), Brazilian linguist
- Maria Radnoti-Alföldi (1926–2022), Hungarian-German archaeologist
- Maria Koptjevskaja-Tamm, Russian-born linguist
- Maria Fusco, British scholarly expressionist
- Maria Tatar (born 1945), American academic
- Maria Polinsky, Russian-American linguist
- Maria Baptist (born 1971), German musician and professor
- Maria Tschetschulin (1852–1917), first female university student in Finland
- Maria Cancian, American economist and university administrator
- María Elósegui (born 1957), Spanish university teacher
- Maria May (1900–1968), German university teacher
- Maria Lucia Yanguas, American economist
- María Yzuel, Spanish professor
- Maria Ascensão (1926–2001), Portuguese folklorist
- Maria Helena Diniz (born 1956), Brazilian jurist and professor
- Maria Amélia Ferreira (born 1955), Portuguese professor of medicine
- Maria Floro, American economics professor
- Maria Janion (1926–2020), Polish scholar
- Maria Natasha Rajah, professor and researcher in cognitive neuroscience
- Maria Servedio, Canadian-American professor
- María-Esther Vidal, Venezuelan professor
- Maria Giulia Amadasi Guzzo, Italian scholar
- Maria Groza, Romanian economist and feminist
- Maria Znamierowska-Prüfferowa, 20th-century Polish ethnographer

scholars

=== Models and beauty pageant winners ===
- María Almenta (born 1997), Spanish model
- María Fernanda Aristizábal (born 1997), Colombian model and beauty pageant titleholder
- María Fernanda Beltrán, Mexican beauty pageant titleholder
- Maria Borges (born 1992), Angolan model
- Maria Harfanti (born 1992), Miss World Indonesia 2015
- Maria Rahajeng (born 1991), Miss World Indonesia 2014
- Maria Ahtisa Manalo (born 1997), Miss International Philippines 2018
- María Lourdes Caldera (born 1983), Venezuelan model
- Maria da Glória Carvalho (born 1950), Brazilian beauty queen
- Maria Chudakova (born 1993), Russian beauty pageant titleholder
- María Fernanda Cornejo (born 1989), Ecuadorian fashion model and beauty queen
- Maria Farhad (born 2001), Iraqi model
- María Eugenia Larraín (born 1973), Chilean model
- María Julia Mantilla (born 1984), Peruvian beauty queen
- Maria Nowakowska (born 1987), Polish beauty pageant titleholder
- Maria Perrusi (born 1991), Italian beauty queen and model
- María Cristina Ramos (model), Puerto Rican model and beauty queen
- Maria Remenyi (born 1945), American model
- Maria Selena (born 1990), Indonesian beauty pageant titleholder who won Puteri Indonesia 2011
- Maria Spiridaki (born 1984), Greek model
- Mária Trošková, former Slovak model and businesswoman
- Maria Thattil, Australian author, media personality and beauty pageant titleholder
- María Bibiana Uribe, Mexican beauty pageant winner
- Maria Wavinya (born 2001), Kenyan model and beauty queen
- María Milagros Véliz (born 1983), Venezuelan beauty pageant winner

=== Businesspeople ===
- María Asunción Aramburuzabala (born 1963), Mexican billionaire businesswoman
- María Arzú, Guatemalan businessperson
- Maria Azua, American businessperson
- Maria Curman (born 1950), Swedish businesswoman
- Maria Daelder, Swedish businesswoman
- María Eugenia Girón, Spanish businesswoman
- Maria Patrizia Grieco (born 1952), Italian businesswomen
- Maria Lock (died 1878), Aboriginal Australian landowner
- Maria Jonn (1855–1910), Swedish photographer and businesswoman
- Maria Giovanna Paone, Italian fashion executive
- Maria Christina Lindström (1806–1895), Swedish businesswoman
- Maria Longworth Storer (1849–1932), American potter and businesswoman
- Maria Sophia Pope (1818–1909), New Zealand shopkeeper and businesswoman
- Maria Musch (1550–1635), Dutch shipowner
- Maria Ramos (businesswoman) (born 1959), South African businesswoman
- Maria Sastre, American businesswoman
- Maria-Elisabeth Schaeffler (born 1941), German businesswoman, heiress and billionaire
- Maria Thomson (1809–1875), New Zealand businesswoman
- Maria Zoéga (1860–1940), Swedish businesswoman
- Maria Reig Moles (born 1951), Andorran entrepreneur
- Maria Lord, Australian convict and entrepreneur
- Maria Feodorovna Morozova (1830–1911), Russian merchant, entrepreneur and philanthropist

=== Criminals and victims of crime ===
- Maria Barbella (1868–1950), American convict
- Mária Gerzsány, Hungarian serial killer
- Maria Swanenburg (1839–1915), Dutch serial killer
- Maria Velten (1916–2008), German serial killer
- Maria Colwell (1965–1973), British female murder victim
- Maria Lauterbach (1987–2007), American murder victim
- Maria Licciardi (born 1951), Italian criminal
- Maria Pasquinelli (1913–2013), Italian teacher, fascist, convicted murderer and centenarian
- María Isabella Cordero (1987–2010), Mexican television anchorwoman and murder victim
- Maria Pearson (murderer), UK's longest-serving female prisoner
- Maria Popesco (1919–2004), Romanian-Swiss socialite and convicted murder
- Maria Romberg, Swedish woman executed for murder in 1725
- Maria Spinola, Italian poisoner

=== Soldiers, war-related figures and revolutionaries ===
- Maria Andreu (1801–after 1860), American US Coast Guard employee
- Maria la Bailadora, Spanish soldier
- Maria Berlinska, Ukrainian military volunteer and women's rights advocate
- Maria Barrett, United States Army general
- Maria Bergamas (1867–1952), Italian unknown soldier
- Maria Bochkareva (1889–1920), Russian female soldier and counter- revolutionary
- Maria Cetys (1914–1944), Polish member of the Home Army
- Maria Stocker (1885–1969), Austrian Righteous Among the Nations recipient
- María Pita (1565–1643), Galician heroine
- Maria Quitéria (1792–1853), Brazilian lieutenant and national heroine
- Maria Doroteia Joaquina de Seixas Brandão (1767–1853), Brazilian heroine
- Maria Walanda Maramis (1872–1924), Indonesian national hero
- Maria Kovalevska (1849–1889), Ukrainian Narodnik
- Maria Schicklgruber (1795–1847), Adolf Hitler's paternal grandmother
- Maria Dimadi (1907–1944), member of the EAM during the Axis occupation of Greece
- María de Estrada, Spanish conqueror
- Maria Limanskaya (1924–2024), Soviet soldier
- Maria Mandl (1912–1948), Austrian Nazi SS commandant of the female camp at Auschwitz concentration camp executed for war crimes
- Maria Leshern von Herzfeld (1847–1921), Russian revolutionary
- Maria Paasche (1909–2000), German rebel
- Maria Mirecka-Loryś (1916–2022), Polish freedom fighter
- Maria Iasneva-Golubeva (1861–1936), Russian revolutionary
- Maria Daskalogianni, Greek fighter
- Maria Kotarba (1907–1956), Polish resistance fighter
- Maria Altmann (1916–2011), Austrian-American Jewish refugee
- Maria Gervais, U.S. Army general
- Maria Kolenkina (1850–1926), Russian socialist revolutionary
- Maria Kutitonskaya (1856–1887), Ukrainian revolutionary
- Maria Olovennikova (1852–1898), Russian revolutionary
- Maria Reiter (1911–1992), Adolf Hitler's love interest
- Maria Olip (1913–1943), Slovenian resistance fighter
- María Pacheco (1496–1531), Castilian revolutionary leader
- Maria Piotrowiczowa (1839–1863), Polish resistance fighter
- María Parado de Bellido (1761–1822), Peruvian independence revolutionary
- Maria Rygier (1885–1953), Italian revolutionary journalist
- Maria Spiridonova (1884–1941), Russian revolutionary
- Maria Subbotina (1854–1878), Russian revolutionary

=== Television personalities, producers and presenters ===
- Maria Aksenova (born 1969), Russian media personality
- María Amuchástegui (1953–2017), Argentine television fitness instructor
- Maria Anzai (1953–2014), Japanese idol
- Maria Bakodimou (born 1965), Greek television presenter
- Maria Baltazzi, American television producer
- Maria Basaglia (1912–1998), Italian film director and screenwriter
- Maria Beatty, Venezuelan filmmaker
- Maria Kastrisianaki (1948–2021), Greek broadcaster
- Maria Bird (1891–1979), British television producer
- Maria Bodøgaard (born 1983), Norwegian television presenter
- María Falcón, Puerto Rican television reporter
- Maria De Filippi (born 1961), Italian presenter
- Maria Quiban (born 1970), American TV weather reporter
- Maria Ho (born 1983), Taiwanese-American poker player and television host/commentator
- Maria Menounos (born 1978), American television presenter
- Maria Montazami (born 1965), Swedish housewife and television personality
- Maria Okanrende (born 1987), Nigerian television and radio personality
- Maria Nur Rowshon (born 1987), Bangladeshi television presenter
- María Amparo Escandón (born 1957), American film producer
- Maria Giese, American film director
- Maria Iliou (born 1960), Greek film director, scriptwriter and producer
- Maria Novaro (born 1951), Mexican film director
- María Paredes, Spanish film editor
- Maria Plyta (1915–2006), Greek film director and screenwriter
- Maria von der Osten-Sacken (1901–1985), German screenwriter and film producer
- Maria Rosada (1899–1970), Italian film editor
- Maria Skobeleva, filmmaker
- Maria Sødahl (born 1965), Norwegian film director

=== Designers ===
- María Araujo (1950–2020), Spanish costume designer
- Maria Bergson (1914–2009), American interior designer, industrial designer and architect
- María Julia Bertotto, Argentine production and costume designer
- Maria Björnson (1949–2002), French theatre designer
- Maria Cornejo, Chilean-born fashion designer based in New York
- Maria De Matteis (1898–1988), Italian costume designer
- Maria Djurkovic, British film production designer
- Maria Galitzine (1988–2020), Russian interior designer
- Maria Grachvogel (born 1969), British fashion designer
- Maria Kipp (1900–1988), American textile designer
- Maria Monaci Gallenga (1880–1944), Italian textile designer and fashion designer
- Maria Pergay (1930–2023), French designer
- Maria Pinto, American fashion designer
- Maria Tash, American jewelry designer and body piercer

=== Architects ===
- Maria Cristina Finucci (born 1956), Italian architect, artist and designer
- Maria Auböck (born 1951), Austrian landscape architect
- Maria Bentel (1928–2000), American architect
- María Victoria Besonías (born 1947), Spanish-born Argentine architect
- Maria Chen, New Zealand architect
- Maria Deroche (1938–2023), French architect
- María Eugenia Hurtado Azpeitia, Mexican architect
- Maria Piechotka (1920–2020), Polish architect
- Maria Protsenko, Soviet and Ukrainian architect
- Maria Rubert de Ventós (born 1956), Spanish architect
- Maria Schwarz (1921–2018), German architect

=== Pilots and aviators ===
- María Marcos Cedillo Salas (1910–1933), first female pilot in Mexico
- Maria Josep Colomer i Luque (1913–2004), Spanish aviator
- Maria Ziadie-Haddad, Jamaican aviator

=== Farmers ===
- Maria Linibi, Papua New Guinean women farmers' leader
- Maria Rita Valdez, Afro-Latina rancher and farmer

=== Educators, librarians and curators ===
- Maria Louise Baldwin (1856–1922), pioneering female African American educator
- Maria Ulrich, Portuguese educationalist
- María Urquides (1908–1994), American educator
- María Cámara Vales, Mexican educator
- Maria Aspman, Swedish educator specializing in women's vocational training
- Maria Balshaw (born 1970), English museum director
- Maria Beruski (1959–1986), Brazilian school teacher
- Maria Boschetti-Alberti (1879–1951), Swiss educator and pedagogue
- María Moliner (1900–1981), Spanish librarian and lexicographer
- Maria Montessori (1870–1952), Italian educator
- Maria Brewster Brooks Stafford (1809–1896), American educator
- Maria Grzegorzewska (1887–1967), Polish educator
- Maria Guajardo, American educator and advocate
- María Stagnero de Munar (1856–1922), Uruguayan educator and feminist
- Maria Ribbing (1842–1910), Swedish schoolteacher and philanthropist
- Maria Leontieva (1792–1874), Russian pedagogue
- Maria Fearing (1838–1937), American teacher and missionary
- Maria Lioudaki (1894–1947), Greek educator, folklorist, and resistance fighter
- Maria de Maeztu (1882–1948), Spanish educator and feminist
- Maria Henschen (1840–1927), Swedish school director
- Maria Schandorff (1784–1848), Norwegian philanthropist and social educator
- Maria Schmitz (1875–1962), German teacher
- Maria Byerley (1787–1843), British schoolmistress
- Maria Chinchilla Recinos (1909–1944), Guatemalan teacher
- Maria Nicanor, museum curator
- Maria Whang (1865–1937), Korean-American educator and community organizer
- Maria Lucília Estanco Louro (1922–2018), Portuguese teacher

=== Philanthropists and socialites ===
- Maria Antonescu (1892–1964), Romanian socialite and philanthropist
- Maria Hackett (1783–1874), English philanthropist
- Maria Keller, American philanthropist
- Maria van Pallaes (1587–1664), Dutch philanthropist
- Maria Mitsotáki (1907–1974), Greek socialite
- Maria Aparecida Pedrossian (1934–2022), Brazilian socialite

=== Civil servants, spies and diplomats ===
- Maria E. Brewer, American diplomat
- Maria Oyeyinka Laose (born 1954), Nigerian diplomat
- Maria Nazareth Farani Azevêdo (born 1957), Brazilian diplomat
- Maria de Jesus dos Reis Ferreira, Angolan diplomat
- Maria Dobrova (1907–1962), Soviet agent
- Maria Patek (born 1958), Austrian civil servant
- Maria Wallis (born 1955), Irish Chief Constable

=== Supercentarians ===
- Maria Branyas (1907–2024), American-born Catalan, world's oldest verified living person
- María Capovilla (1889–2006), Ecuadorian supercentenarian
- Maria do Carmo Gerônimo (1871–2000), Brazilian supercentenarian and former slave
- Maria Giuseppa Robucci (1903–2019), Italian supercentenarian

=== Chefs and food manufacturers ===
- María Fernanda Di Giacobbe (born 1964), Venezuelan chocolatier
- Maria Guyomar de Pinha (1664–1728), Siamese cook
- María Marte (born 1978), Dominican chef

=== Explorers, settlers and native leaders ===
- Maria van Cortlandt van Rensselaer (1645–1689), Dutch director of Rensselaerwyck
- Maria Leijerstam (born 1978), British polar adventurer
- Maria van Riebeeck (1629–1664), French Huguenot settler in Dutch Cape Colony
- María la Grande (c. 1789–1841), Tehuelche leader of the early 19th century
- Maria Solares (1842–1923), Chumash ancestor

=== Other people ===
- Maria Craig, British telegraphist
- Maria Helena de Senna Fernandes, Macanese tourism director
- María Holly (born 1932), widow of rock and roll pioneer Buddy Holly
- Maria Josefa Jaramillo Carson, wife of Kit Carson
- Maria Jolas (1893–1987), American publisher
- Maria Mileaf, American theater director
- Maria Signorelli (1908–1992), Italian puppet master
- Maria Stevens (died after 1707), 18th-century English woman

== Fictional characters ==
- Maria, the main antagonist of the anime Witchblade
- Maria, a supporting character in Shakespeare's play Twelfth Night
- Maria (West Side Story), the main female protagonist from the musical West Side Story
- María Clara, a character from the novel Noli Me Tángere by Filipino writer and activist José Rizal
- Maria Campbell, a character in the anime My Next Life as a Villainess: All Routes Lead to Doom!
- Jose Maria Gonzalez, the starring role in Wild Side Story
- Maria Hill, a SHIELD agent in Marvel Comics
- Maria Himesato, a character from Aikatsu!
- Maria Jackson, a character from The Sarah Jane Adventures
- Maria Renard, a character in the Castlevania video game series
- Maria Robotnik, a character in the Sonic the Hedgehog video game series
- Maria Santiago, a character from The Loud House
- Maria Valkyrie, protagonist of video games Valkyrie Elysium
- Maria von Trapp, the main female protagonist of the musical The Sound of Music
- Maria, a playable cleric and the younger sister of Minerva, from Fire Emblem: Shadow Dragon and the Blade of Light
- Maria Mikhailovna Kujou, a supporting character and older sister of Alisa, from Japanese light novel: Alya Sometimes Hides Her Feelings in Russian

== See also ==
- Maria (disambiguation)
- Maria Sole (disambiguation)
- María Sol (disambiguation)
