= 1939 in the United States =

- Decades: 1910s; 1920s; 1930s; 1940s; 1950s
- See also: History of the United States (1918–1945); Timeline of United States history (1930–1949); List of years in the United States

Events from the year 1939 in the United States.

== Incumbents ==
=== Federal government ===
- President: Franklin D. Roosevelt (D-New York)
- Vice President: John Nance Garner (D-Texas)
- Chief Justice: Charles Evans Hughes (New York)
- Speaker of the House of Representatives: William B. Bankhead (D-Alabama)
- Senate Majority Leader: Alben W. Barkley (D-Kentucky)
- Congress: 75th (until January 3), 76th (starting January 3)

==== State governments ====
Governors and lieutenant governors

=== Governors ===
- Governor of Alabama: Bibb Graves (Democratic) (until January 17), Frank M. Dixon (Democratic) (starting January 17)
- Governor of Arizona: Rawghlie Clement Stanford (Democratic) (until January 2), Robert Taylor Jones (Democratic) (starting January 2)
- Governor of Arkansas: Carl Edward Bailey (Democratic)
- Governor of California: Frank Merriam (Republican) (until January 2), Culbert Olson (Democratic) (starting January 2)
- Governor of Colorado: Teller Ammons (Democratic) (until January 10), Ralph Lawrence Carr (Republican) (starting January 10)
- Governor of Connecticut: Wilbur Lucius Cross (Democratic) (until January 4), Raymond E. Baldwin (Republican) (starting January 4)
- Governor of Delaware: Richard C. McMullen (Democratic)
- Governor of Florida: Fred P. Cone (Democratic)
- Governor of Georgia: Eurith D. Rivers (Democratic)
- Governor of Idaho: Barzilla W. Clark (Democratic) (until January 2), C. A. Bottolfsen (Republican) (starting January 2)
- Governor of Illinois: Henry Horner (Democratic)
- Governor of Indiana: M. Clifford Townsend (Democratic)
- Governor of Iowa: Nelson G. Kraschel (Democratic) (until January 12), George A. Wilson (Republican) (starting January 12)
- Governor of Kansas: Walter A. Huxman (Democratic) (until January 9), Payne Ratner (Republican) (starting January 9)
- Governor of Kentucky: Happy Chandler (Democratic) (until October 9), Keen Johnson (Democratic) (starting October 9)
- Governor of Louisiana: Richard W. Leche (Democratic) (until June 26), Earl K. Long (Democratic) (starting June 26)
- Governor of Maine: Lewis O. Barrows (Republican)
- Governor of Maryland: Harry W. Nice (Republican) (until January 11), Herbert R. O'Conor (Democratic) (starting January 11)
- Governor of Massachusetts: Charles F. Hurley (Democratic) (until January 5), Leverett Saltonstall (Republican) (starting January 5)
- Governor of Michigan:
  - until January 1: Frank Murphy (Democratic)
  - January 1 – March 16: Frank Fitzgerald (Republican)
  - starting March 16: Luren Dickinson (Republican)
- Governor of Minnesota: Elmer A. Benson (Farmer-Labor) (until January 2), Harold E. Stassen (Republican) (starting January 2)
- Governor of Mississippi: Hugh L. White (Democratic)
- Governor of Missouri: Lloyd C. Stark (Democratic)
- Governor of Montana: Roy E. Ayers (Democratic)
- Governor of Nebraska: Robert Leroy Cochran (Democratic)
- Governor of Nevada: Richard Kirman, Sr. (Democratic) (until January 2), Edward P. Carville (Democratic) (starting January 2)
- Governor of New Hampshire: Francis P. Murphy (Republican)
- Governor of New Jersey: A. Harry Moore (Democratic)
- Governor of New Mexico: Clyde Tingley (Democratic) (until January 1), John E. Miles (Democratic) (starting January 1)
- Governor of New York: Herbert H. Lehman (Democratic)
- Governor of North Carolina: Clyde R. Hoey (Democratic)
- Governor of North Dakota: William Langer (Republican) (until January 5), John Moses (Democratic) (starting January 5)
- Governor of Ohio: Martin L. Davey (Democratic) (until January 9), John W. Bricker (Republican) (starting January 9)
- Governor of Oklahoma: Ernest W. Marland (Democratic) (until January 9), Leon C. Phillips (Democratic) (starting January 9)
- Governor of Oregon: Charles H. Martin (Democratic) (until January 9), Charles A. Sprague (Republican) (starting January 9)
- Governor of Pennsylvania: George Howard Earle III (Democratic) (until January 17), Arthur James (Republican) (starting January 17)
- Governor of Rhode Island: Robert E. Quinn (Democratic) (until January 3), William Henry Vanderbilt III (Republican) (starting January 3)
- Governor of South Carolina: Olin D. Johnston (Democratic) (until January 17), Burnet R. Maybank (Democratic) (starting January 17)
- Governor of South Dakota: Leslie Jensen (Republican) (until January 3), Harlan J. Bushfield (Republican) (starting January 3)
- Governor of Tennessee: Gordon Browning (Democratic) (until January 16), Prentice Cooper (Democratic) (starting January 16)
- Governor of Texas: James V. Allred (Democratic) (until January 17), W. Lee O'Daniel (Democratic) (starting January 17)
- Governor of Utah: Henry H. Blood (Democratic)
- Governor of Vermont: George David Aiken (Republican)
- Governor of Virginia: James H. Price (Democratic)
- Governor of Washington: Clarence D. Martin (Democratic)
- Governor of West Virginia: Homer A. Holt (Democratic)
- Governor of Wisconsin: Philip La Follette (Wisconsin Progressive) (until January 2), Julius P. Heil (Republican) (starting January 2)
- Governor of Wyoming: Leslie A. Miller (Democratic) (until January 2), Nels H. Smith (Republican) (starting January 2)

=== Lieutenant governors ===
- Lieutenant Governor of Alabama: Thomas E. Knight (Democratic) (until January 17), Albert A. Carmichael (Democratic) (starting January 17)
- Lieutenant Governor of Arkansas: Robert B. Bailey (Democratic)
- Lieutenant Governor of California: George J. Hatfield (Republican) (until January 2), Ellis E. Patterson (Democratic) (starting January 2)
- Lieutenant Governor of Colorado: Frank J. Hayes (Democratic) (until January 10), John Charles Vivian (Republican) (starting January 10)
- Lieutenant Governor of Connecticut: T. Frank Hayes (Democratic) (until January 4), James L. McConaughy (Republican) (starting January 4)
- Lieutenant Governor of Delaware: Edward W. Cooch (Democratic)
- Lieutenant Governor of Idaho: Charles C. Gossett (Democratic) (until January 2), Donald S. Whitehead (Republican) (starting January 2)
- Lieutenant Governor of Illinois: John H. Stelle (Democratic)
- Lieutenant Governor of Indiana: Henry F. Schricker (Democratic)
- Lieutenant Governor of Iowa: John K. Valentine (Democratic) (until January 12), Bourke B. Hickenlooper (Republican) (starting January 12)
- Lieutenant Governor of Kansas: William M. Lindsay (Democratic) (until month and day unknown), Carl E. Friend (Republican) (starting month and day unknown)
- Lieutenant Governor of Kentucky: Keen Johnson (Democratic) (until October 9), Rodes K. Myers (political party unknown) (starting October 9)
- Lieutenant Governor of Louisiana: Earl K. Long (Democratic) (until June 26), Coleman Lindsey (Democratic) (starting June 26)
- Lieutenant Governor of Massachusetts: Francis E. Kelly (Democratic)
- Lieutenant Governor of Michigan:
  - until month and day unknown: Leo J. Nowicki (Democratic)
  - month and day unknown: Luren D. Dickinson (Republican)
  - starting month and day unknown: vacant
- Lieutenant Governor of Minnesota: Gottfrid Lindsten (Republican) (until January 2), C. Elmer Anderson (Republican) (starting January 2)
- Lieutenant Governor of Mississippi: Jacob Buehler Snider (Democratic)
- Lieutenant Governor of Missouri: Frank Gaines Harris (Democratic)
- Lieutenant Governor of Montana: Hugh R. Adair (Democratic)
- Lieutenant Governor of Nebraska: Nate M. Parsons (Democratic) (until January 5), William E. Johnson (Republican) (starting January 5)
- Lieutenant Governor of Nevada: Fred S. Alward (political party unknown) (until January 2), Maurice J. Sullivan (Democratic) (starting January 2)
- Lieutenant Governor of New Mexico: Hiram M. Dow (Democratic) (until month and day unknown), James Murray, Sr. (Democratic) (starting month and day unknown)
- Lieutenant Governor of New York: Charles Poletti (Democratic) (starting January 1)
- Lieutenant Governor of North Carolina: Wilkins P. Horton (Democratic)
- Lieutenant Governor of North Dakota: Thorstein H. H. Thoresen (Republican) (until January 5), Jack A. Patterson (Republican) (starting January 5)
- Lieutenant Governor of Ohio: Paul P. Yoder (Democratic) (until January 9), Paul M. Herbert (Republican) (starting January 9)
- Lieutenant Governor of Oklahoma: James E. Berry (Democratic)
- Lieutenant Governor of Pennsylvania: Thomas Kennedy (Democratic) (until January 17), Samuel S. Lewis (Democratic) (starting January 17)
- Lieutenant Governor of Rhode Island: Raymond E. Jordan (Democratic) (until January 3), James O. McManus (Republican) (starting January 3)
- Lieutenant Governor of South Carolina: Joseph Emile Harley (Democratic)
- Lieutenant Governor of South Dakota: Donald McMurchie (Republican)
- Lieutenant Governor of Tennessee: Bryan Pope (Democratic) (until month and day unknown), Blan R. Maxwell (Democratic) (starting month and day unknown)
- Lieutenant Governor of Texas: Walter Frank Woodul (Democratic) (until January 17), Coke Robert Stevenson (Democratic) (starting January 17)
- Lieutenant Governor of Vermont: William H. Wills (Republican)
- Lieutenant Governor of Virginia: Saxon W. Holt (Democratic)
- Lieutenant Governor of Washington: Victor A. Meyers (Democratic)
- Lieutenant Governor of Wisconsin: Herman L. Ekern (Progressive) (until January 2), Walter S. Goodland (Republican) (starting January 2)

== Events ==
=== January ===
- January 1
  - The Hewlett-Packard Company is founded in Palo Alto, California.
  - Texas A&M University wins its only football national championship.
- January 5 – Pioneer aviator Amelia Earhart is officially declared dead after her 1937 disappearance.
- January 17 – Frank M. Dixon is sworn in as the 40th governor of Alabama replacing Bibb Graves.

=== February ===
- February 6 – Raymond Chandler's hardboiled California private detective Philip Marlowe is introduced in his first full-length work of crime fiction, The Big Sleep, published by Alfred A. Knopf.
- February 15 – John Ford's Western film Stagecoach starring John Wayne premieres in New York City and Los Angeles.
- February 18 – The Golden Gate International Exposition opens in San Francisco.
- February 20 – A Nazi rally at Madison Square Garden is organized by the German American Bund in New York City. More than 20,000 people attend and Fritz Julius Kuhn is a featured speaker.
- February 23 – The 11th Academy Awards are presented at Biltmore Hotel in Los Angeles without an official host, with Frank Capra's You Can't Take It with You winning the Academy Award for Outstanding Production. The film is receives the most nominations with seven, with Capra winning his third Best Director award. Michael Curtiz and William Keighley's The Adventures of Robin Hood receives the most awards with three.
- February 27 – Sitdown strikes are outlawed by the Supreme Court of the United States.

=== March ===
- March 3 – Students at Harvard University demonstrate the new tradition of swallowing goldfish to reporters.
- March 22 – Undefeated LIU Brooklyn Blackbirds men's basketball team tops undefeated Loyola of Chicago in the championship game of the second annual National Invitation Tournament, 44–32. LIU's 24–0 final record is the first perfect season of college basketball's postseason tournament era.
- March 28 – American adventurer Richard Halliburton delivers a last message from a Chinese junk, before he disappears on a voyage across the Pacific Ocean.

=== April ===
- April 9 – African-American singer Marian Anderson performs before 75,000 people at the Lincoln Memorial in Washington, D.C., after having been denied the use both of Constitution Hall by the Daughters of the American Revolution, and of a public high school by the federally controlled District of Columbia. First Lady Eleanor Roosevelt resigns from the DAR because of their decision.
- April 10 – Alcoholics Anonymous ("The Big Book") is first published.
- April 14 – John Steinbeck's novel The Grapes of Wrath is first published.
- April 16 – The Boston Bruins defeat the Toronto Maple Leafs in the fifth and final game of the Stanley Cup Finals to capture their second championship in ice hockey.
- April 20 – Billie Holiday records "Strange Fruit", the first anti-lynching song, in New York.
- April 30 – The 1939 New York World's Fair opens.

=== May ===
- May 1 – Batman makes his first appearance in Detective Comics #27.
- May 2 – Major League Baseball's Lou Gehrig, the legendary New York Yankees first baseman known as "The Iron Horse", ends his 2,130 consecutive games played streak after contracting amyotrophic lateral sclerosis. The record stands for 56 years before Cal Ripken Jr. plays 2,131 consecutive games.
- May 20 – Pan American Airways begins trans-Atlantic mail service with the inaugural flight of its Boeing 314 flying boat Yankee Clipper from Port Washington, New York to Marseille.

=== June ===
- June – Superman (comic book) begins publication.
- June 4 – The SS St. Louis, a ship carrying a cargo of 907 Jewish refugees, is denied permission to land in Florida after already having been turned away from Cuba. Forced to return to Europe, many of the passengers later die in Nazi death camps during the Holocaust.
- June 6 – The first Little League Baseball game is played in Williamsport, Pennsylvania.
- June 7 – British King George VI and Queen Elizabeth cross the Canadian border into the United States being the first reigning British monarch to visit the United States.
- June 10 – MGM's first successful animated character, Barney Bear, makes his debut in The Bear That Couldn't Sleep. However, it is not until 1942 that his name is adopted.
- June 12 – The National Baseball Hall of Fame and Museum is officially dedicated in Cooperstown, New York.
- June 21 – The New York Yankees announce first baseman Lou Gehrig's retirement, after doctors reveal he has amyotrophic lateral sclerosis.

=== July ===
- July 2
  - The 1st World Science Fiction Convention opens in New York City.
  - The newly sculpted head of Theodore Roosevelt is dedicated at Mount Rushmore, by Harlan J. Bushfield and William S. Hart.
- July 4 – Lou Gehrig gives his "Farewell to Baseball" speech at Yankee Stadium. In it, he says, "Today, I consider myself the luckiest man on the face of the earth."
- July 8 – The Pan American Airways Boeing 314 flying boat Yankee Clipper inaugurates the world's first heavier-than-air North Atlantic air passenger service between the United States (Port Washington, New York) and Britain.

=== August ===
- August 2 – The Einstein–Szilard letter is signed by Albert Einstein on Long Island, advising President of the United States Franklin D. Roosevelt of the potential use of uranium to construct an atomic bomb. It is delivered on October 11 and leads to the first meeting on October 21 of the Advisory Committee on Uranium and ultimately to the Manhattan Project.
- August 15 – MGM's classic color musical film The Wizard of Oz, based on L. Frank Baum's famous novel, and starring Judy Garland as Dorothy, premieres at Grauman's Chinese Theatre in Hollywood. On August 25 it is released in movie theaters throughout the United States.
- August 31 – The first edition of Marvel Comics is published by Timely Publications, debuting the characters of Namor, the Angel, and the Human Torch.

=== September ===
- September 1
  - General George C. Marshall becomes Chief of Staff of the United States Army.
  - World War II: The Special Division is created within the State Department to help with repatriation efforts abroad particularly in Europe with Breckinridge Long heading the Special Division.
- September 3 – World War II: SS Athenia, a British ocean liner is torpedoed by a German submarine off the Irish coast with 30 Americans onboard dying.
- September 4 – The State Department declares all US passports that are outstanding invalid for travelling to Europe and requires all those applying to document a need for foreign travel.
- September 5 – World War II: The United States declares its neutrality in the war.
- September 11 – Mark Twain National Forest is established in Missouri.
- September 21 – WJSV broadcast day: Radio station WJSV in Washington, D.C. records an entire broadcast day for preservation in the National Archives.
- September 29 – Gerald J. Cox, speaking at an American Water Works Association meeting, becomes the first person to publicly propose the fluoridation of public water supplies in the United States.
- September 30 – 1939 Waynesburg vs. Fordham football game, the first televised American football game, between college teams Fordham University and Waynesburg College at Randall's Island, New York.

=== October ===
- October 8 – The New York Yankees defeat the Cincinnati Reds in the fourth and final game of the World Series, to capture their fourth consecutive championship in baseball.
- October 15 – The New York Municipal Airport (later renamed La Guardia Airport) is dedicated.
- October 17 – Comedy-drama film Mr. Smith Goes to Washington premieres in Washington, D.C.
- October 21 – The first meeting of the U.S. Advisory Committee on Uranium is held under Lyman James Briggs, authorized by President Roosevelt to oversee neutron experiments, a precursor of the Manhattan Project.
- October 22 – In the first televised NFL football game, the Brooklyn Dodgers defeat the Philadelphia Eagles 23–14 at Ebbets Field.
- October 24 – Nylon stockings go on sale for the first time anywhere in Wilmington, Delaware.
- October 25 – The Time of Your Life, a drama by William Saroyan, debuts in New York City.

=== November ===
- November 4 – World War II: U.S. President Franklin D. Roosevelt signs the Neutrality Act of 1939 into law. The arms embargo previously put into place by the Neutrality Act of 1937 is lifted and put any trade with nations engaged in war under cash-and-carry grounds. American ships and planes are prohibited as part of the Act from visiting any belligerent state in a war along with transporting anything.
- November 6 – Hedda Hopper's Hollywood debuts on radio with Hollywood gossip columnist Hedda Hopper as host (the show runs until 1951, making Hopper a powerful figure in the Hollywood elite).
- November 8 – CBS television station W2XAB resumes test transmission with an all-electronic system broadcast from the top of the Chrysler Building in New York City.
- November 15 – In Washington, D.C., U.S. President Franklin D. Roosevelt lays the cornerstone of the Jefferson Memorial.

=== December ===
- December 2 – La Guardia Airport opens for business in New York City.
- December 15 – The film Gone with the Wind, starring Vivien Leigh, Clark Gable, Olivia de Havilland and Leslie Howard, premieres at Loew's Grand Theatre in Atlanta, Georgia. It is based on Margaret Mitchell's best-selling novel. It is the longest American film made up to this time (nearly four hours).
- December 22 – The second cel-animated feature film and the first produced by an American studio other than Walt Disney Productions, Gulliver's Travels (by Fleischer Studios, and very loosely based upon the book by Jonathan Swift), is released.
- December 29 – The prototype of the Consolidated B-24 Liberator bomber first flies.

=== Undated ===
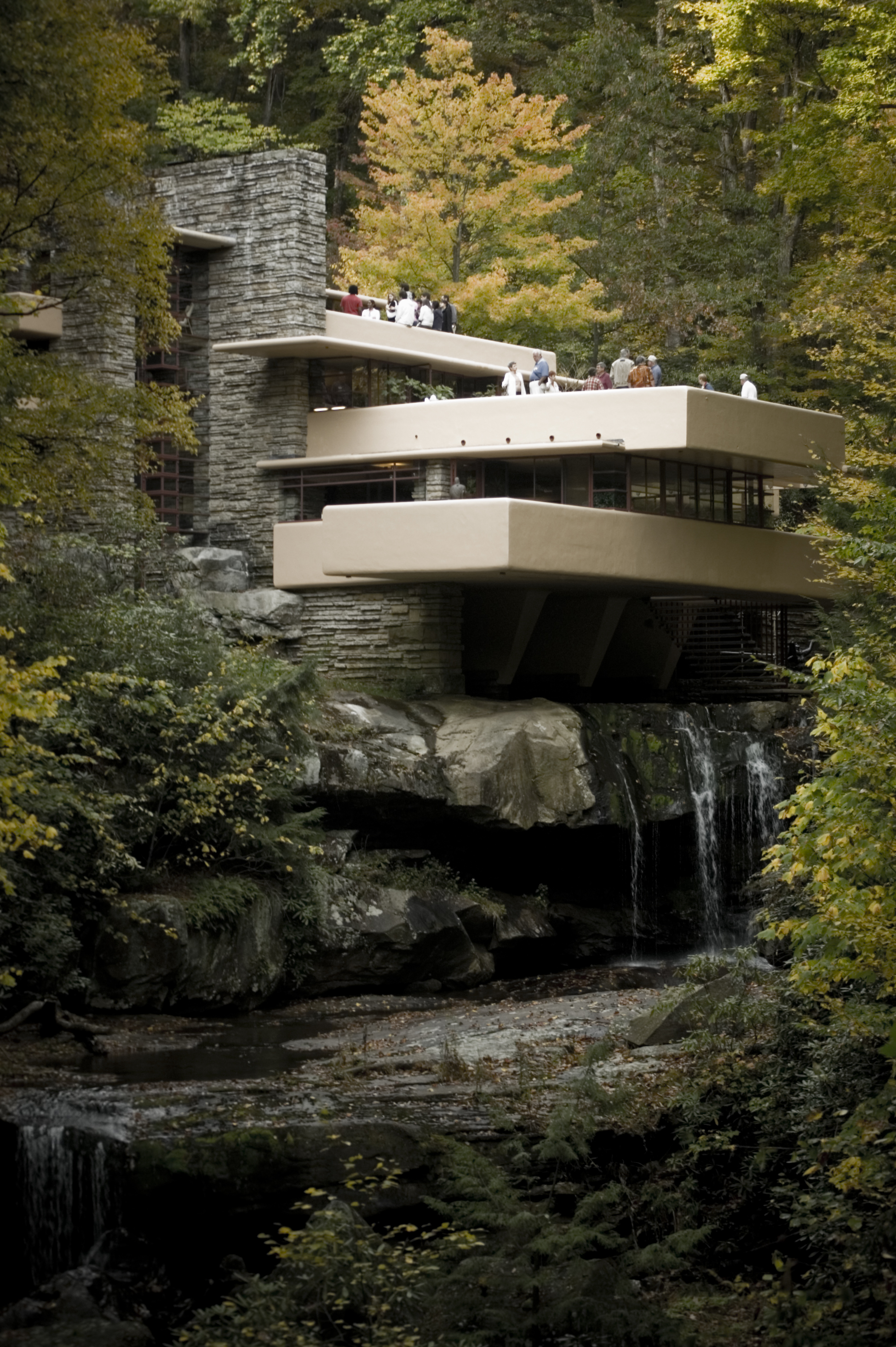
Fallingwater

- Sandia View Academy, a private Adventist school, is founded in Corrales, New Mexico,
- General Motors introduces the Hydra-Matic drive, the first mass-produced, fully automatic transmission, as an option in 1940 model year Oldsmobile automobiles.
- Construction of Fallingwater, designed by Frank Lloyd Wright, is completed.
- A logging crew sets off the second of three major forest fires in the Tillamook Burn of Oregon, which destroys 209,690 acres (848.6 km^{2}).

=== Ongoing ===
- New Deal (1933–1939)

== Births ==
=== January ===
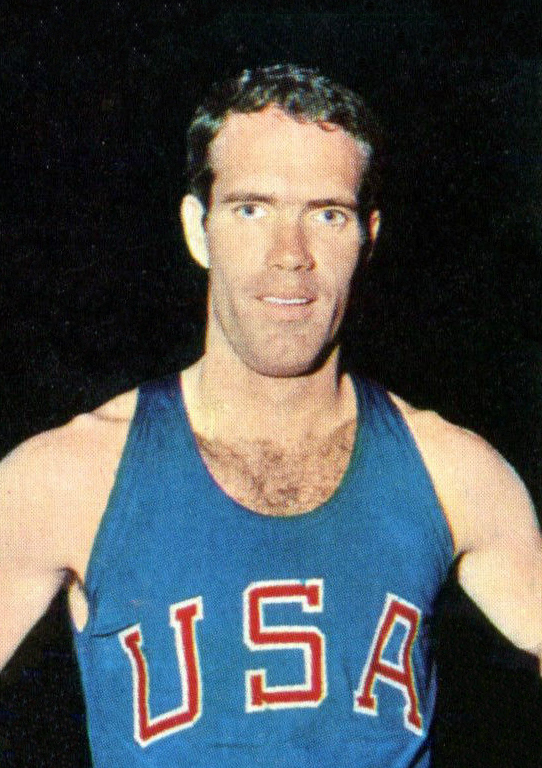
Bill Toomey

- January 3 – Gene Summers, American rock 'n' roll singer (member of Rockabilly Hall of Fame) (d. 2021)
- January 8 – Ruth Maleczech, American actress (d. 2013)
- January 9 – Jimmy Boyd, American singer, musician and actor (d. 2009)
- January 10
  - David Horowitz, American conservative writer (d. 2025)
  - William Levy, American-Dutch journalist, author and poet (d. 2019)
  - Sal Mineo, American actor (d. 1976)
  - Bill Toomey, American athlete
- January 12
  - William Lee Golden, American country and gospel singer, member of the Oak Ridge Boys
  - Jim Palosaari, American evangelist (d. 2011)
- January 13 – Paul Henderson, journalist and winner of the Pulitzer Prize for Investigative Reporting (d. 2018)
- January 16 – Mac Curtis, American singer (d. 2013)
- January 17 – Maury Povich, American talk show host
- January 18 – Bo Gritz, U.S. presidential candidate
- January 19 – Phil Everly, American rock 'n' roll musician (member of Rockabilly Hall of Fame) (d. 2014)
- January 20 – Paul Coverdell, American politician (d. 2000)
- January 24 – Ray Stevens, American musician
- January 27 – Julius Lester, American civil rights activist, writer, musician, photographer and professor (d. 2018)
- January 31 – Jerry Brudos, American serial killer (d. 2006)

=== February ===
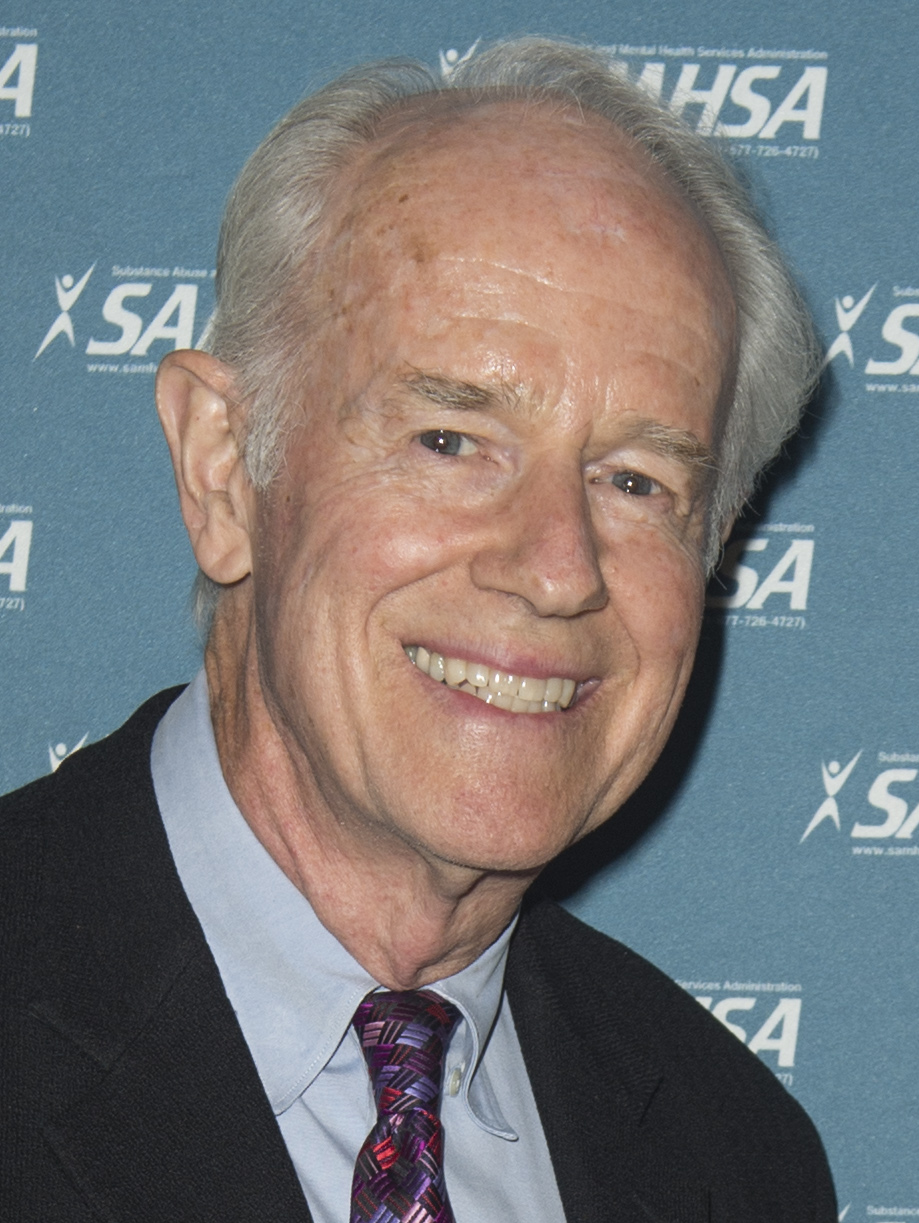
Mike Farrell

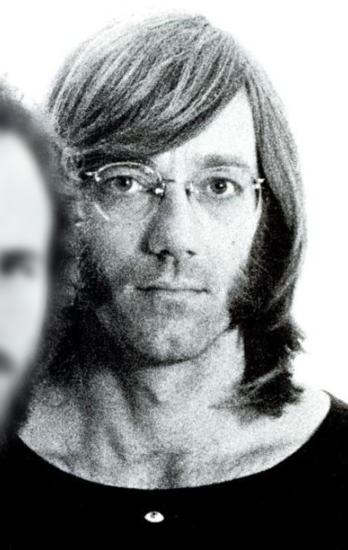
Ray Manzarek

- February 1
  - Del McCoury, American bluegrass musician
  - Joe Sample, American pianist, keyboardist and composer (d. 2014)
- February 2 – Mary-Dell Chilton, American biochemist (d. 2026)
- February 3 – Michael Cimino, American film director (d. 2016)
- February 4 – Stan Lundine, American politician
- February 6
  - Mike Farrell, American actor
  - Augie Garrido, American baseball player, coach (d. 2018)
- February 8 – Rod Diridon Sr., American politician (d. 2026)
- February 9
  - Red Lane, American singer-songwriter (d. 2015)
  - Barry Mann, American songwriter
- February 10 – Barbara Kolb, American composer (d. 2024)
- February 11
  - Gerry Goffin, American lyricist (d. 2014)
  - Jane Yolen, American writer and poet (d. 2026)
- February 12
  - John D. Hancock, American actor and film director
  - Ray Manzarek, American keyboardist (The Doors) (d. 2013)
- February 13 – R. C. Sproul, American Reformed theologian, author and pastor (d. 2017)
- February 14 – Blowfly, American musician, songwriter and record producer (d. 2016)
- February 15 – Robert Hansen, American serial killer (d. 2014)
- February 18 – Dal Maxvill, American baseball player and manager
- February 20
  - Herbert Kohler Jr., American businessman (d. 2022)
  - Abraham Quintanilla, American singer, songwriter and record producer (d. 2025)
- February 23
  - Denis Arndt, American actor (d. 2025)
  - Rachel Elkind-Tourre, American record producer
- February 25 – John Leonard, American literary, television, film and cultural critic (d. 2008)
- February 26 – Clark Coolidge, American poet
- February 27 – Peter Revson, American race car driver (d. 1974)
- February 28
  - John Fahey, American guitarist and composer (d. 2001)
  - Tommy Tune, American dancer, choreographer and actor

=== March ===
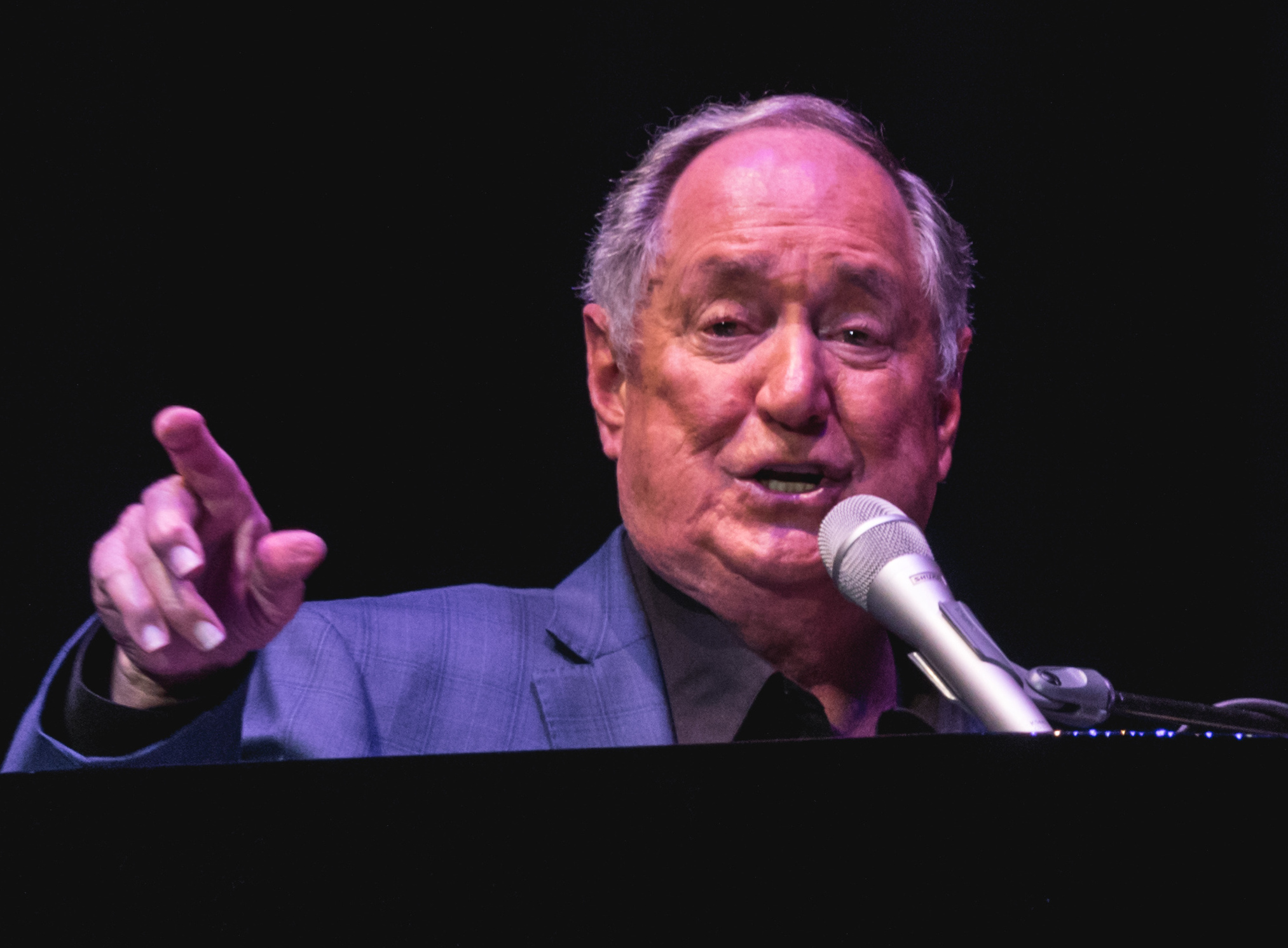
Neil Sedaka

- March 2 – Manch Wheeler, American footballer (died 2018)
- March 4 – Jack Fisher, baseball pitcher
- March 6 – Kit Bond, politician (died 2025)
- March 9 – Malcolm Bricklin, automotive pioneer
- March 12 – Johnny Callison, baseball player (died 2006)
- March 13 – Neil Sedaka, singer-songwriter (died 2026)
- March 14 – William B. Lenoir, astronaut (died 2010)
- March 15 – Ted Kaufman, politician
- March 17 – Jim Gary, sculptor (died 2006)
- March 25 – Toni Cade Bambara, African-American writer (died 1995)
- March 27 – Cale Yarborough, race car driver (d. 2023)
- March 29 – Jonathan Daniels, civil rights leader and Episcopal seminarist (died 1965)

=== April ===
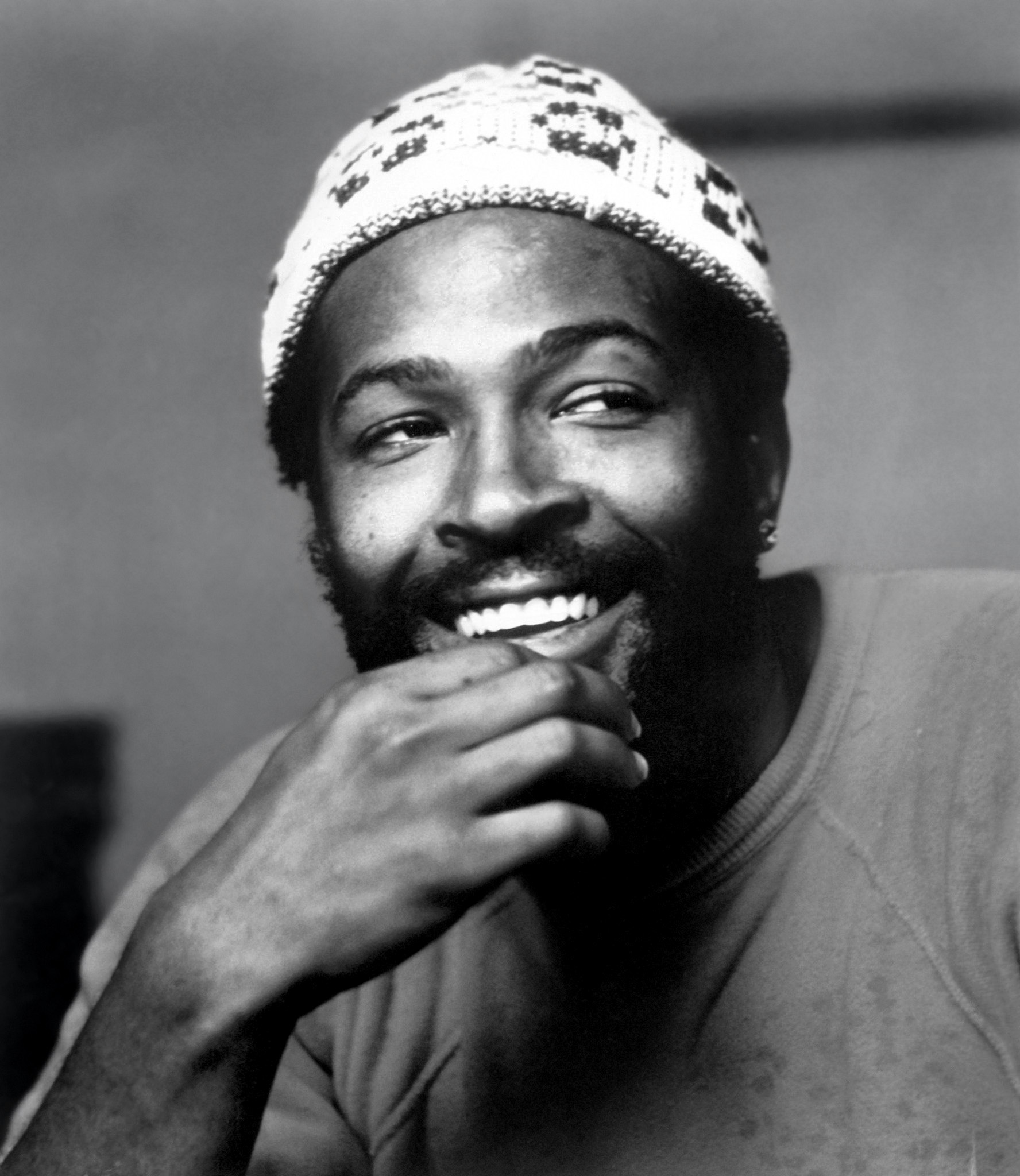
Marvin Gaye

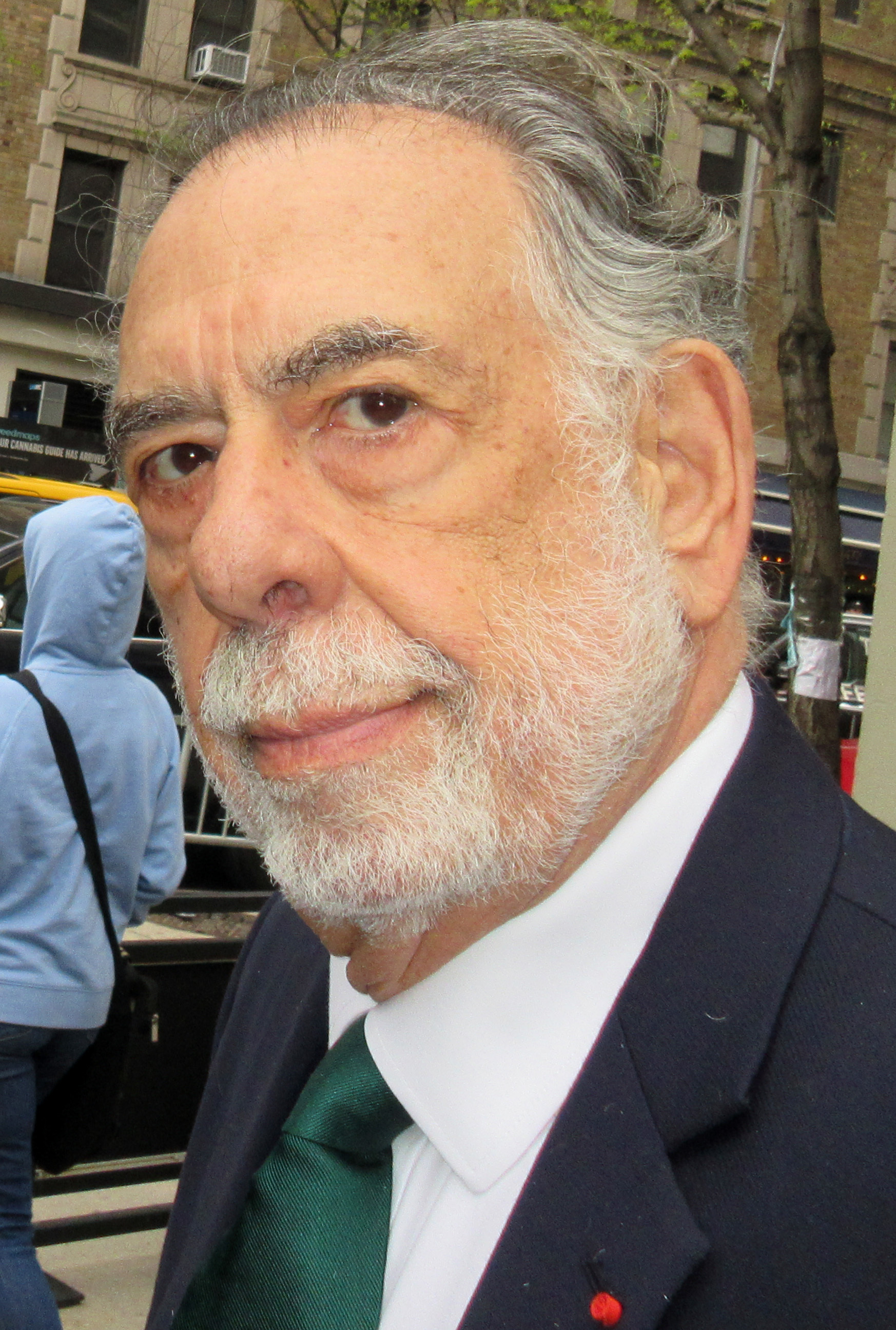
Francis Ford Coppola

- April 1
  - Mary K. Gaillard, American physicist (d. 2025)
  - Phil Niekro, American baseball player (d. 2020)
- April 2 – Marvin Gaye, African-American R&B singer-songwriter and record producer (d. 1984)
- April 4
  - JoAnne Carner, American professional golfer
  - Ernie Terrell, African-American professional boxer (d. 2014)
- April 7 – Francis Ford Coppola, American film director
- April 8 – Elizabeth Clare Prophet, American writer (d. 2009)
- April 9 – George Harrison, American competition swimmer (d. 2011)
- April 10 – Alan Rothenberg, American lawyer and sports executive
- April 11 – Louise Lasser, American actress
- April 13 – Paul Sorvino, American actor (d. 2022)
- April 16 – John Delafose, American Zydeco accordionist (d. 1994)
- April 22 – Jason Miller, American playwright, actor (d. 2001)
- April 23
  - David Birney, American actor and director (d. 2022)
  - Lee Majors, American actor
  - Ray Peterson, American singer (d. 2005)

=== May ===
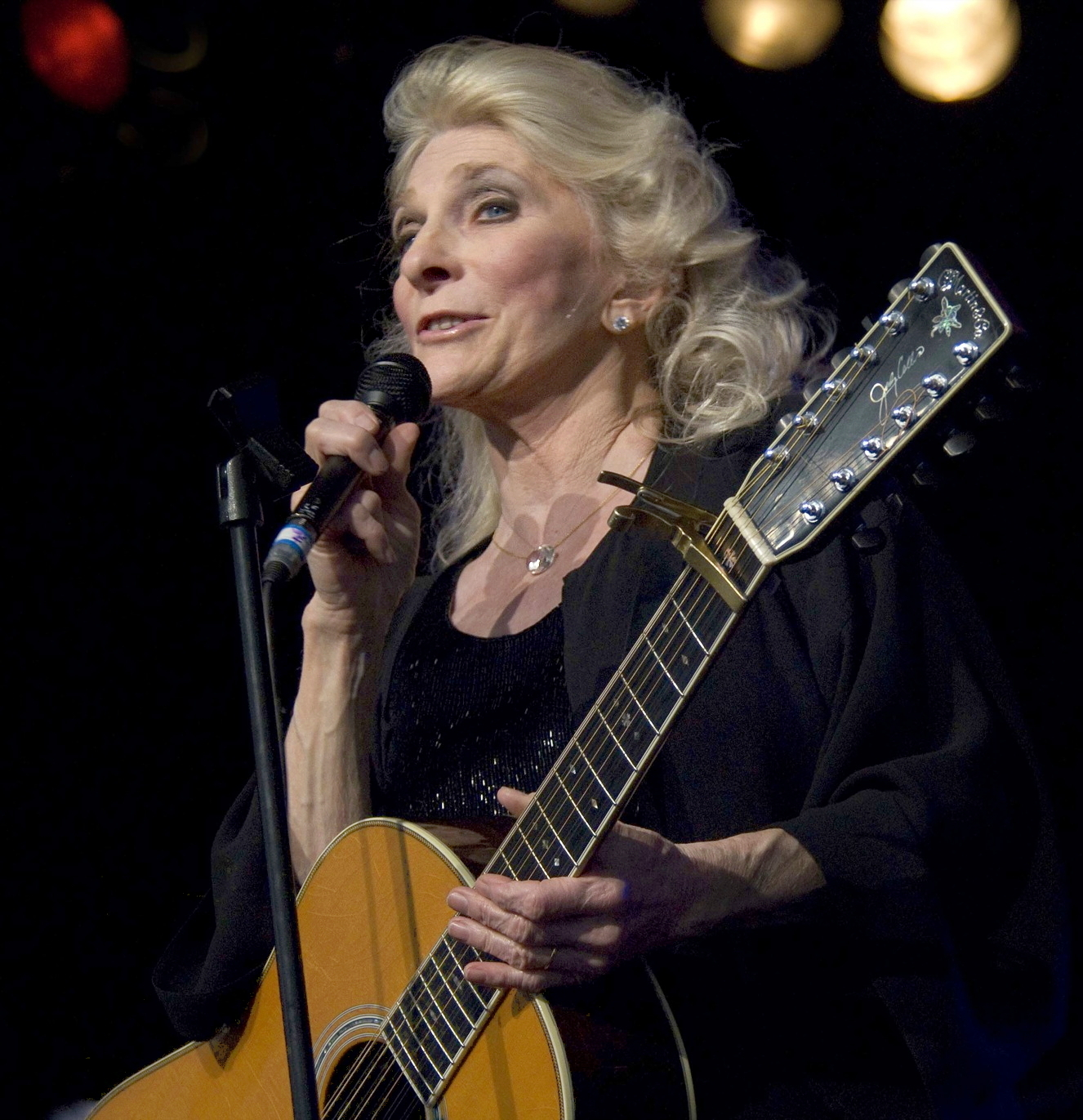
Judy Collins

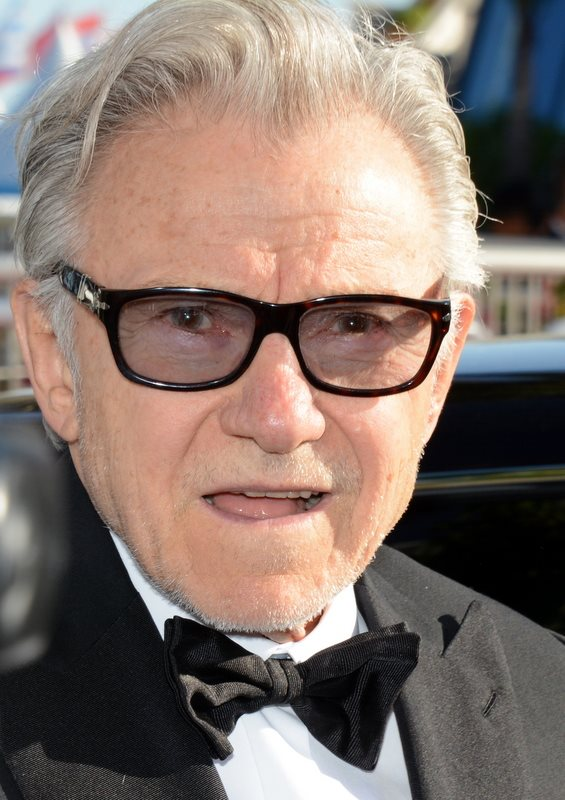
Harvey Keitel

- May 1
  - Judy Collins, American singer-songwriter
  - Max Robinson, American journalist and academic (d. 1988)
- May 4 – Paul Gleason, American actor (d. 2006)
- May 7 – Stephen Harmelin, American lawyer and speechwriter (d. 2025)
- May 8 – Paul Drayton, American Olympic athlete (d. 2010)
- May 9
  - James M. Bardeen, American physicist (d. 2022)
  - Ralph Boston, American Olympic athlete (d. 2023)
- May 11 – Milt Pappas, American baseball player (d. 2016)
- May 12 – Ron Ziegler, White House Press Secretary (d. 2003)
- May 13 – Harvey Keitel, American actor
- May 15 – Barbara Hammer, American filmmaker (d. 2019)
- May 19
  - Sonny Fortune, American jazz musician (d. 2018)
  - Nancy Kwan, American actress
  - Dick Scobee, American astronaut (d. 1986)
- May 22 – Paul Winfield, African-American actor (d. 2004)
- May 23 – Robert A. M. Stern, American architect (d. 2025)
- May 25
  - Dixie Carter, American actress (d. 2010)
  - Larry LeGrande, American baseball player (d. 2023)
- May 26
  - Brent Musburger, American sports announcer
  - Herb Trimpe, American author and illustrator (d. 2015)
- May 27
  - Marilyn McLeod, American songwriter (d. 2021)
  - Don Williams, American country singer (d. 2017)
- May 29 – Al Unser, American race car driver (d. 2021)
- May 30 – Michael J. Pollard, American actor (d. 2019)

=== June ===
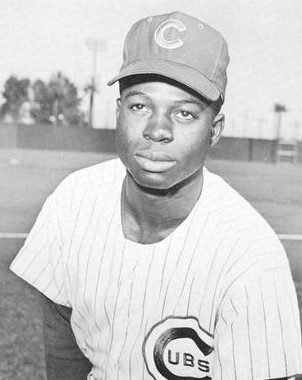
Lou Brock

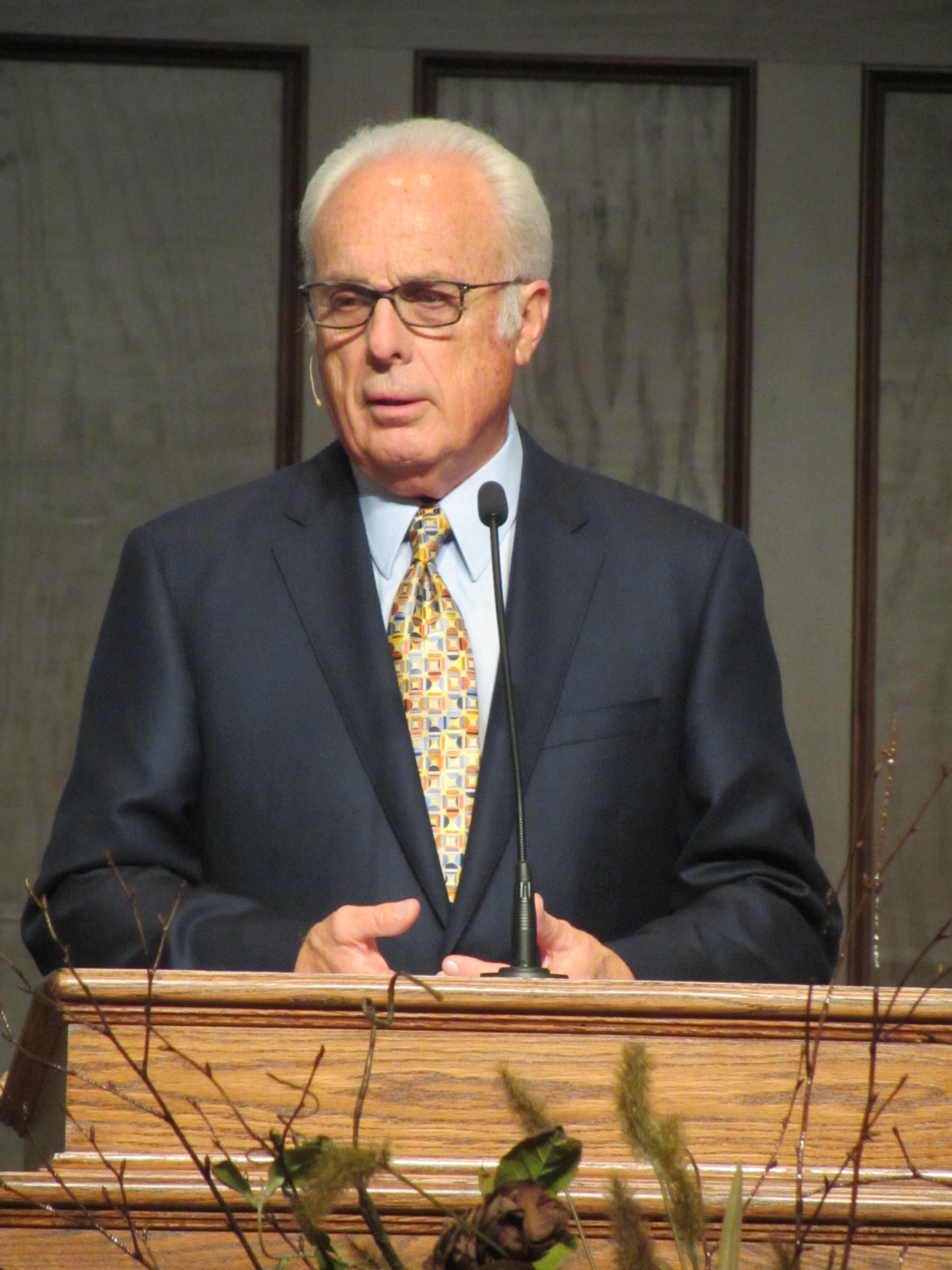
John MacArthur

- June 2 – John Schlee, American golfer (d. 2000)
- June 6 – Marian Wright Edelman, American activist, founder of Children's Defense Fund
- June 8
  - Herb Adderley, American football player (d. 2020)
  - Bernie Casey, African-American football player and actor (d. 2017)
  - Ruthe Blalock Jones, American painter
- June 11
  - Wilma Burgess, American country music singer (d. 2003)
  - Christina Crawford, American author and actress
- June 14 – Tom Matte, American football player (d. 2021)
- June 16 – Billy Craddock, American country and rockabilly singer
- June 18 – Lou Brock, African-American baseball player (d. 2020)
- June 19 – John MacArthur, American pastor
- June 20
  - Bob Neuwirth, American singer-songwriter (d. 2022)
  - Alice Palmer, politician (d. 2023)
- June 21
  - Charles Boone, American composer
  - Charles Jencks, American architectural critic and cultural historian (d. 2019 in the United Kingdom)
- June 24
  - Stephen Dunn, American poet (d. 2021)
  - Henry L. Garrett III, American politician
- June 25
  - Curtis McClinton, American football player
  - Barbara Montgomery, American actress
- June 26 – Chuck Robb, American politician
- June 27 – Brereton C. Jones, American politician (d. 2023)
- June 28
  - Jack Harbaugh, American football player, coach
- June 30 – Martin A. Herman, American politician

=== July ===
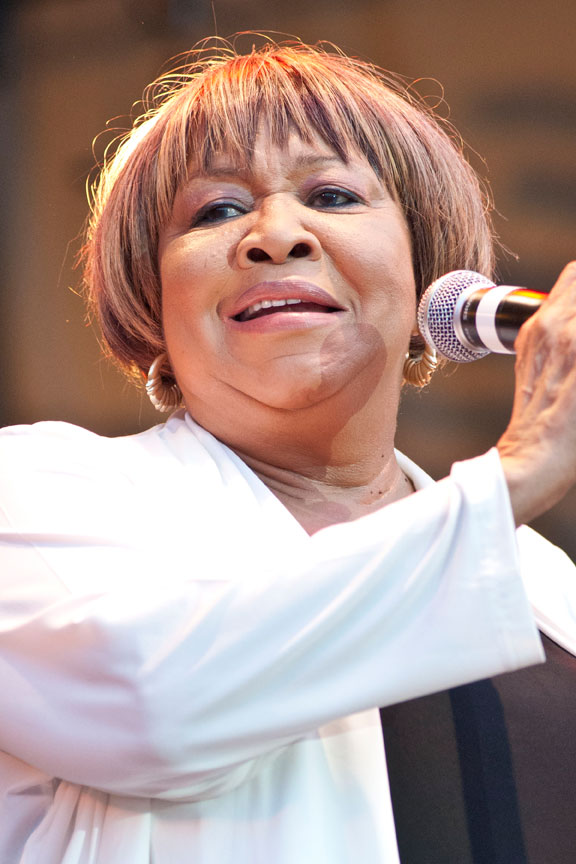
Mavis Staples

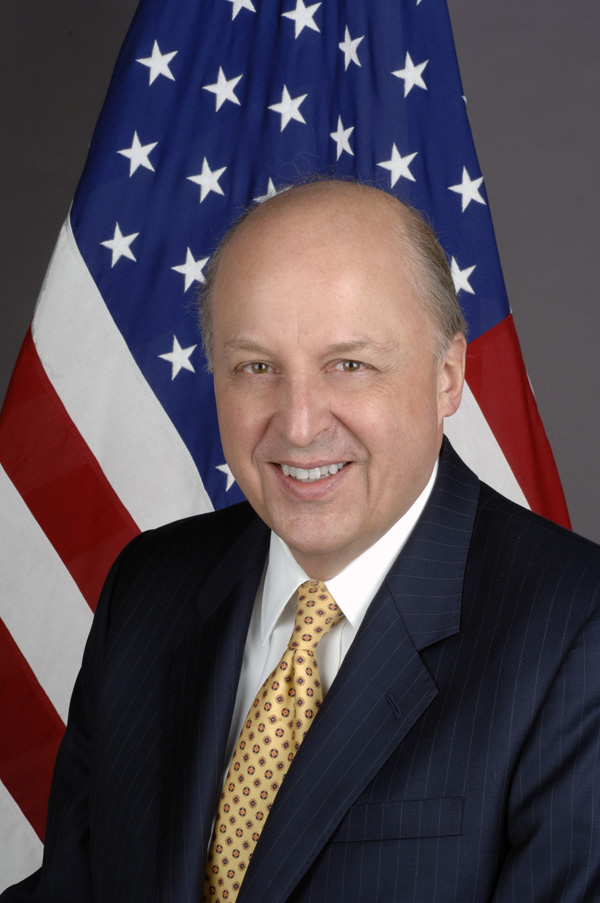
John Negroponte

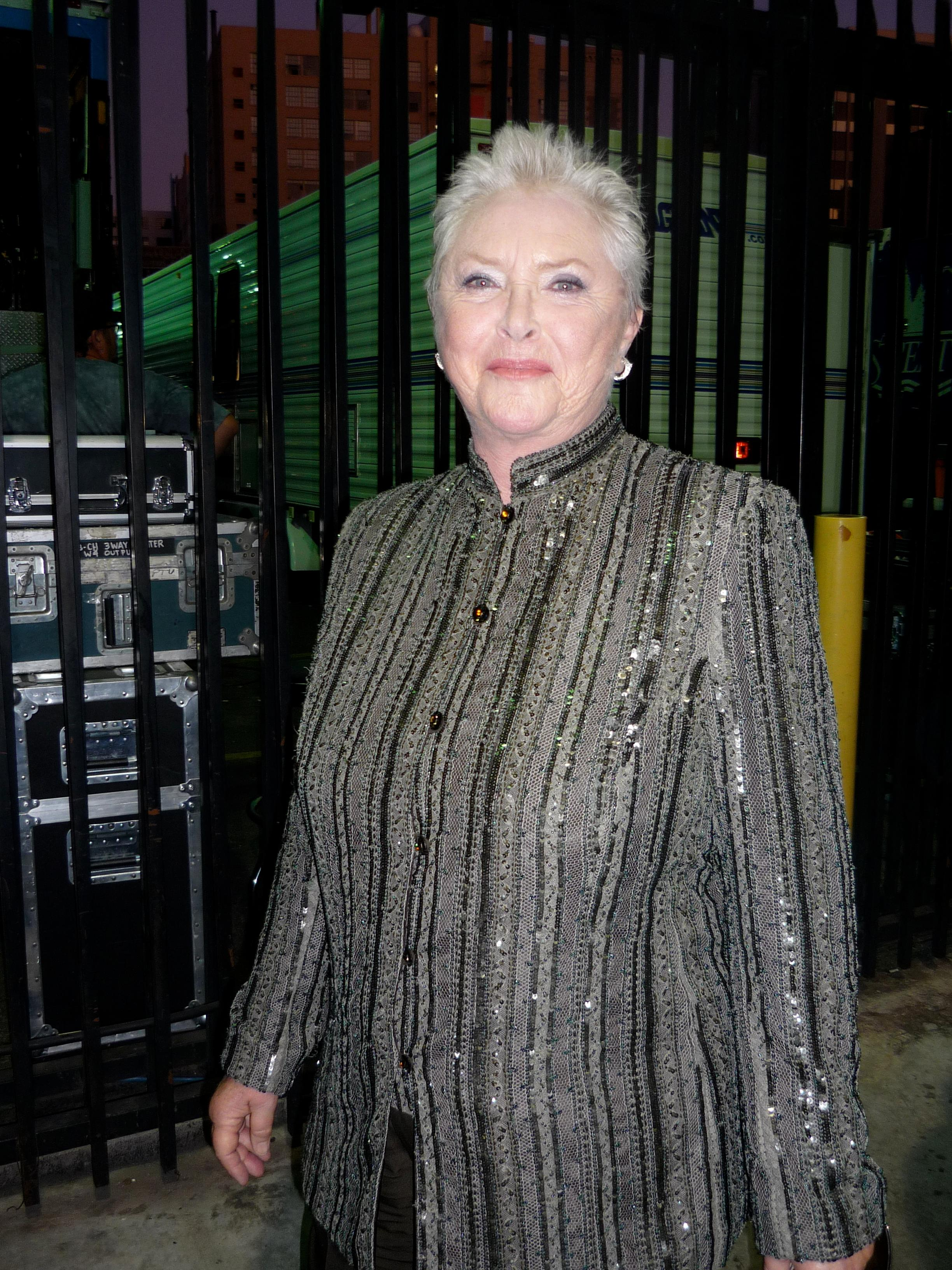
Susan Flannery

- July 1 – Frank Parker, American actor (d. 2018)
- July 2
  - Mike Castle, American attorney, politician (d. 2025)
  - John H. Sununu, American politician
- July 4
  - Lee Folkins, American football tight end
  - Gene McDowell, American college football coach (d. 2021)
  - George Vecsey, American journalist, sportswriter
- July 5 – Booker Edgerson, American football player
- July 6 – Bruce Hunter, American competition swimmer (d. 2018)
- July 10 – Mavis Staples, African-American R&B and gospel singer, actress and civil rights activist
- July 11
  - Clara Adams-Ender, U.S. Army officer
  - Stephen Berger, American entrepreneur, investment banker, civil servant and political advisor
  - Larry Laoretti, American golfer
- July 12
  - Barbara Crossette, American journalist, author
  - Arlen Ness, American motorcycle designer, entrepreneur (d. 2019)
- July 14
  - Sid Haig, American actor (d. 2019)
  - George Edgar Slusser, American scholar, writer (d. 2014)
- July 15
  - Mike Shannon, American baseball player and sportscaster (d. 2023)
  - Patrick Wayne, actor
- July 16
  - William Bell, American soul singer-songwriter
  - Denise LaSalle, African-American blues and R&B/soul singer-songwriter and record producer (d. 2018)
- July 18
  - Sidney Davidoff, American lawyer and political adviser (d. 2025)
  - Dion DiMucci, American singer-songwriter
- July 20 – Judy Chicago, American feminist artist
- July 21 – John Negroponte, U.S. Director of National Intelligence
- July 22 – Raul Yzaguirre, American civil rights activist
- July 26 – Bob Lilly, American football player
- July 27
  - Irv Cross, American football player and sportscaster (d. 2021)
  - William Eggleston, American photographer
- July 30 – Peter Bogdanovich, American film director (d. 2022)
- July 31 – Susan Flannery, American soap opera actress

=== August ===
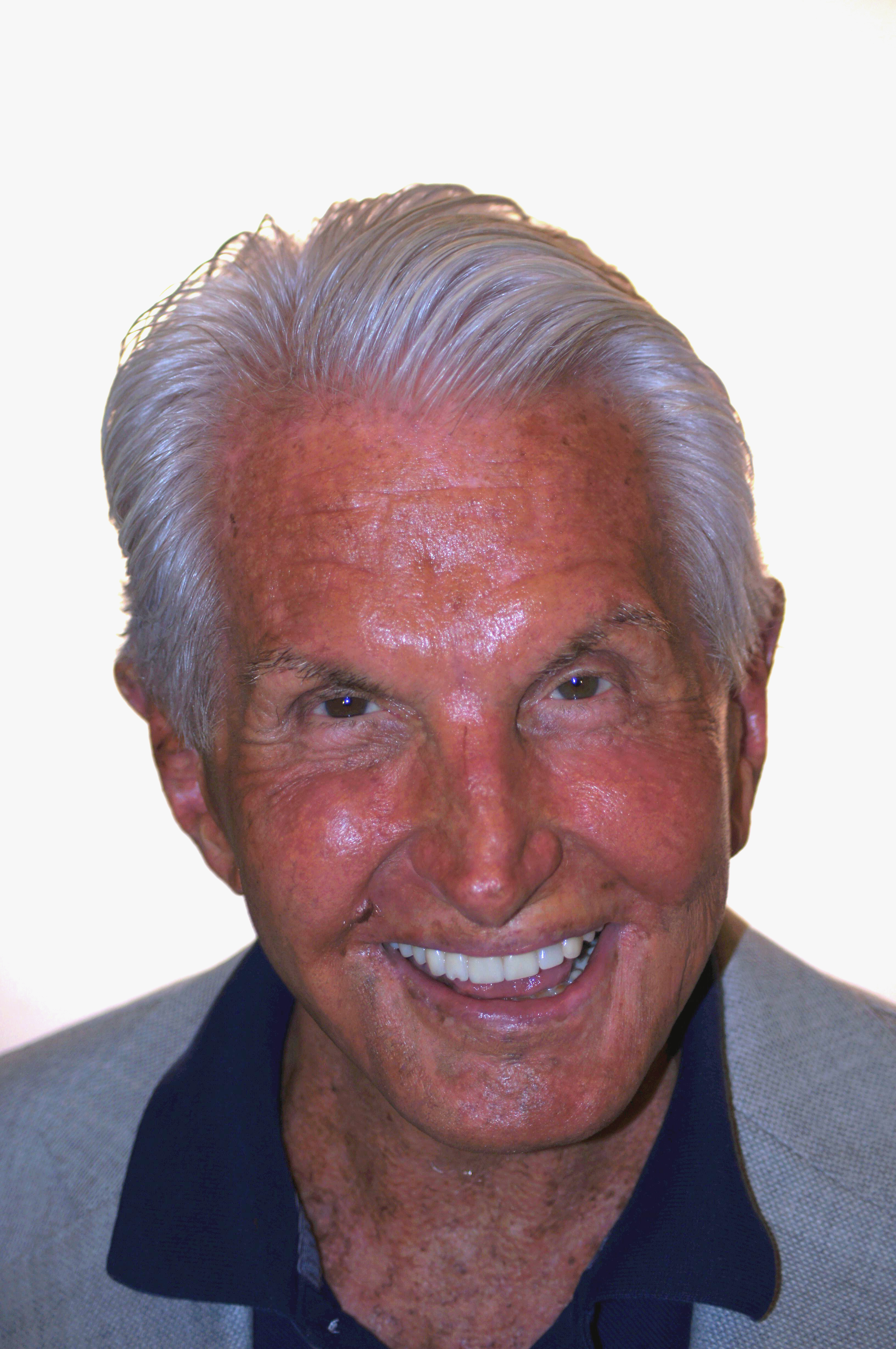
George Hamilton

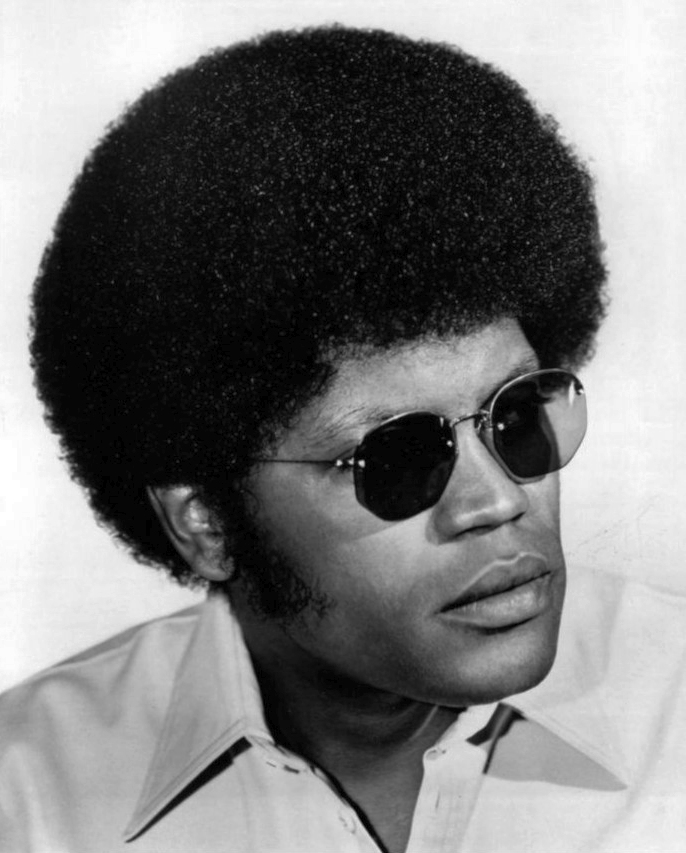
Clarence Williams III

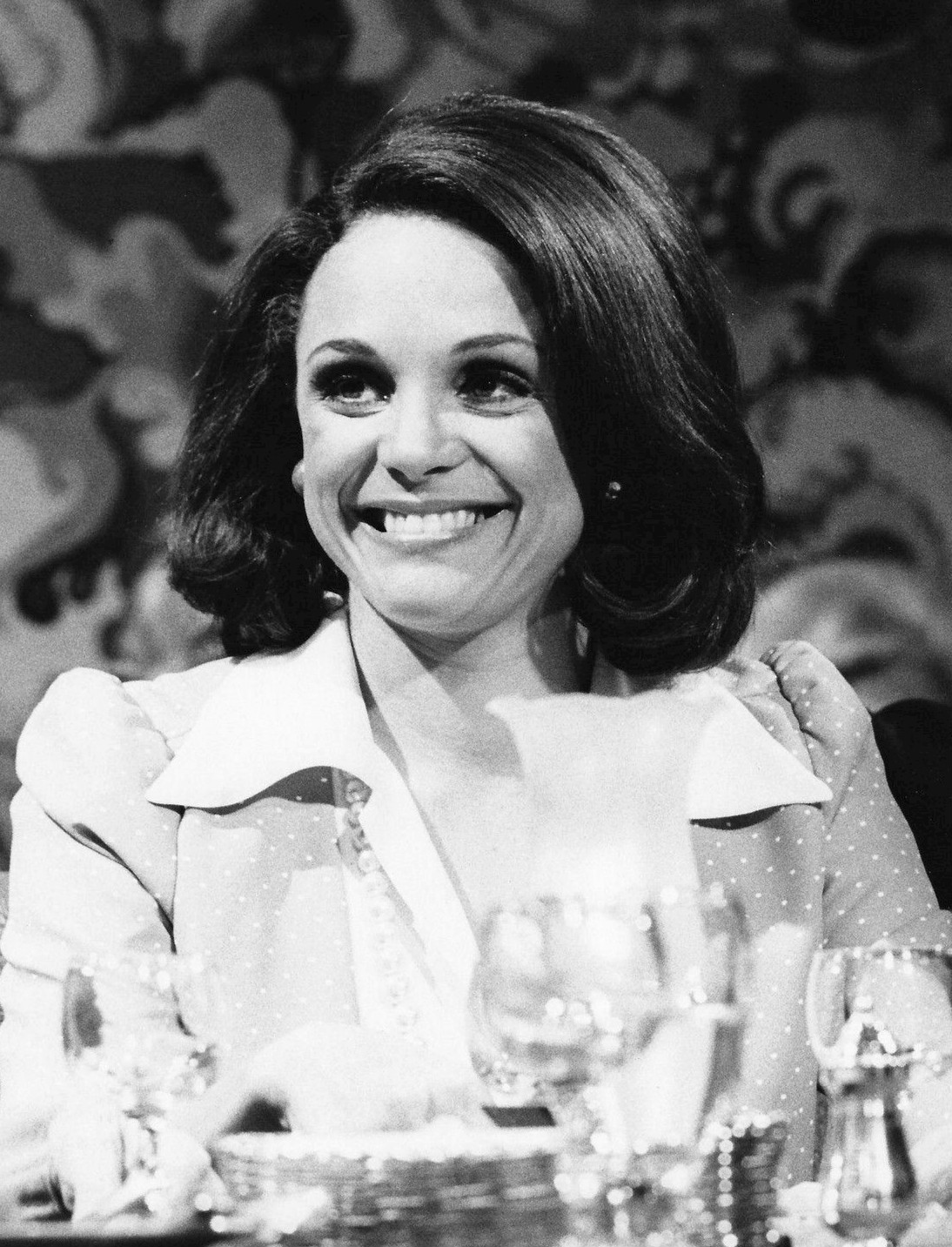
Valerie Harper

- August 1
  - Terry Kiser, American actor
  - Robert James Waller, American novelist (d. 2017)
- August 2
  - Benjamin Barber, American political theorist, author (d. 2017)
  - Wes Craven, American film director, writer (d. 2015)
  - John W. Snow, 73rd United States Secretary of the Treasury
- August 4 – Frankie Ford, American singer (d. 2015)
- August 7 — Roger McMurrin, American conductor and Presbyterian pastor (d. 2023)
- August 8 – Arthur Riggs, geneticist (died 2022)
- August 9 – The Mighty Hannibal, singer-songwriter and record producer (died 2014)
- August 12
  - Skip Caray, baseball broadcaster (died 2008)
  - Charley Frazier, football player (died 2022)
  - George Hamilton, actor
  - David Jacobs, television writer and producer (died 2023)
- August 13 – Howard Tate, soul singer-songwriter (died 2011)
- August 16
  - Billy Joe Shaver, country singer-songwriter (died 2020)
  - Eric Weissberg, folk musician (died 2020)
- August 18
  - Molly Bee, country music singer (died 2009)
  - Johnny Preston, singer (died 2011)
- August 21 – Clarence Williams III, African-American actor (The Mod Squad) (died 2021)
- August 22
  - Sally Grossman, model (died 2021)
  - Valerie Harper, actress (died 2019)
  - Fred Milano, doo-wop singer (died 2012)
  - Carl Yastrzemski, baseball player
- August 27 – Bill Mulliken, competition swimmer (d. 2014)
- August 29 – Joel Schumacher, film producer and director (d. 2020)
- August 30 – Elizabeth Ashley, actress

=== September ===
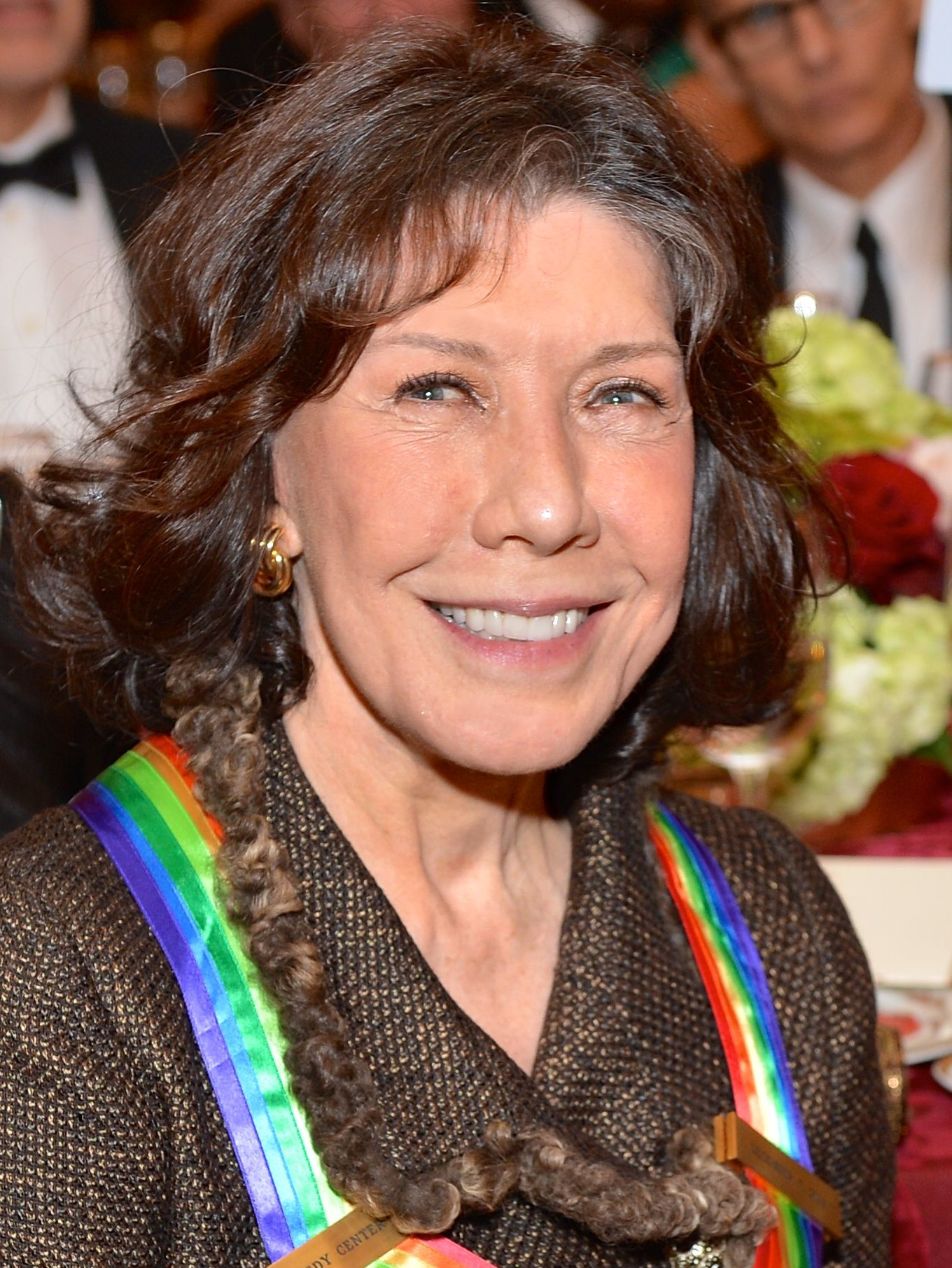
Lily Tomlin

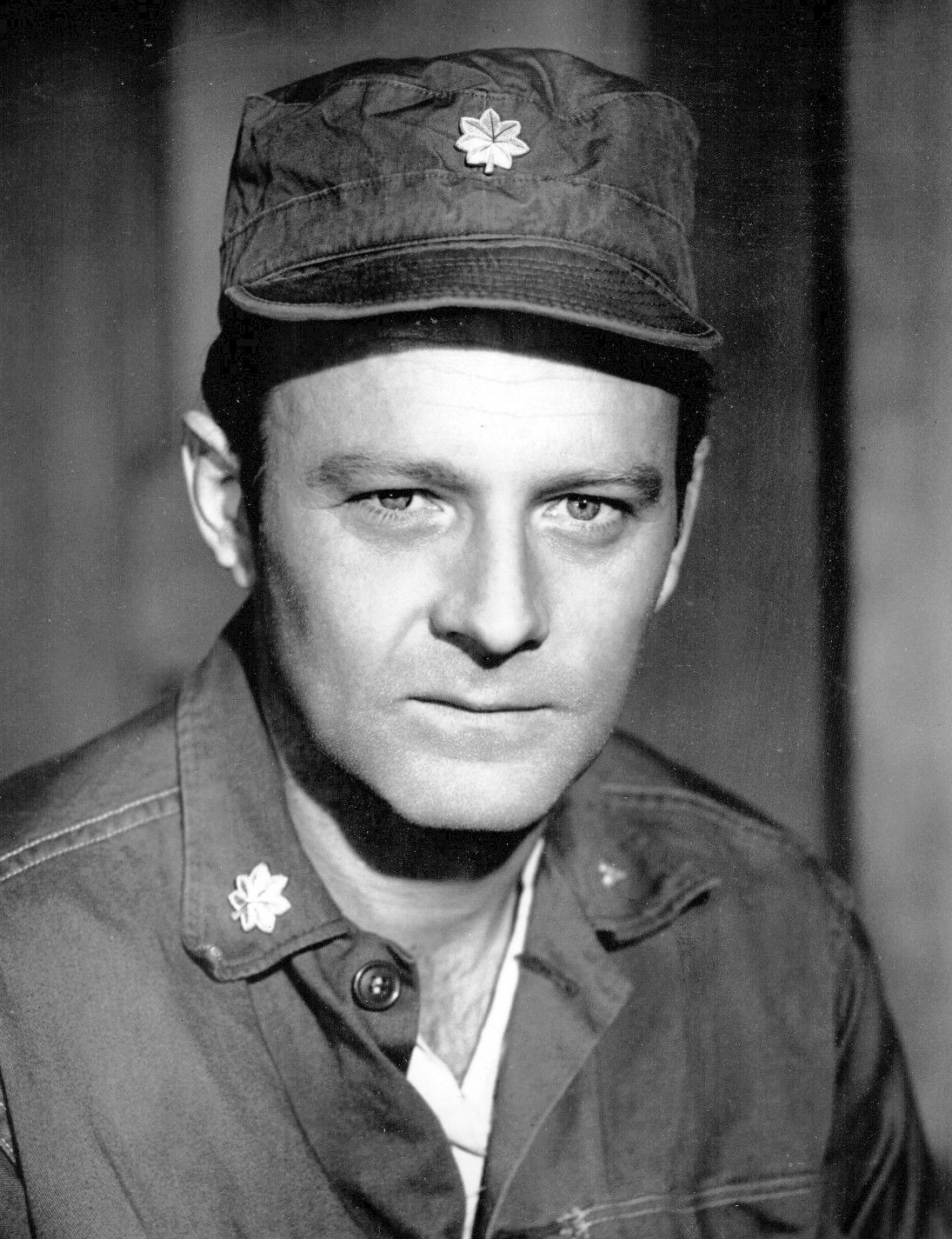
Larry Linville

- September 1 – Lily Tomlin, American actress and comedian
- September 4 – Richard Mazza, American businessman and politician (d. 2024)
- September 5
  - Donna Anderson, American actress
  - Claudette Colvin, American civil rights activist and nurse (d. 2026)
  - William Devane, American actor
  - John Stewart, American folk musician (d. 2008)
- September 6
  - Brigid Berlin, American actress, artist (d. 2020)
  - Dan Cragg, American science-fiction author
  - David Allan Coe, American country singer-songwriter and musician
- September 7 – S. David Griggs, American astronaut (d. 1989)
- September 9 – Ron McDole, American football player
- September 10 – Greg Mullavey, American actor
- September 11 – Charles Geschke, American inventor and businessman (d. 2021)
- September 12
  - Phillip Ramey, American composer
  - Henry Waxman, American politician
- September 13 – Richard Kiel, American actor (d. 2014)
- September 17 – David Souter, Associate Justice of the Supreme Court of the United States (d. 2025)
- September 20 – Michu Meszaros, Hungarian-born American actor (ALF) (d. 2016)
- September 22
  - Gilbert E. Patterson, American minister and bishop (d. 2007)
  - Marlena Shaw, American jazz singer (d. 2024)
  - Tim Wirth, American politician
- September 24
  - Mark Elliott, American voice-over artist for The Walt Disney Company (d. 2021)
  - Wayne Henderson, American trombonist, record producer (d. 2014)
  - Patrick Kearney, American serial killer
- September 25 – David S. Mann, American lawyer, politician
- September 26 – Judith Appelbaum, American editor, consultant and author (d. 2018)
- September 27 – Kathy Whitworth, American professional golfer (d. 2022)
- September 29 – Larry Linville, American actor (M*A*S*H) (d. 2000)

=== October ===
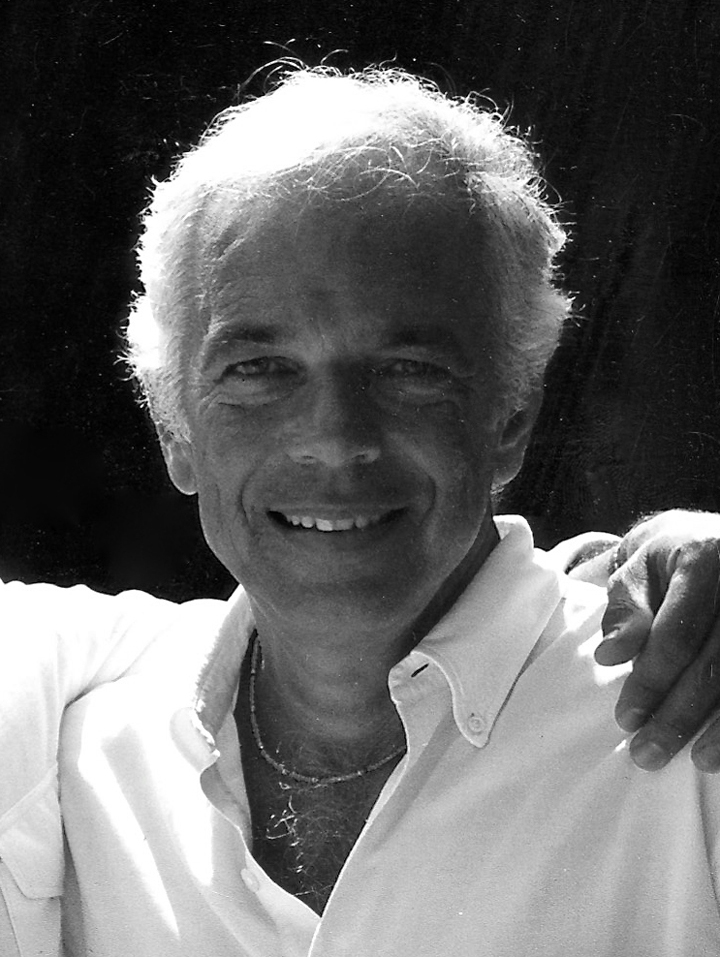
Ralph Lauren

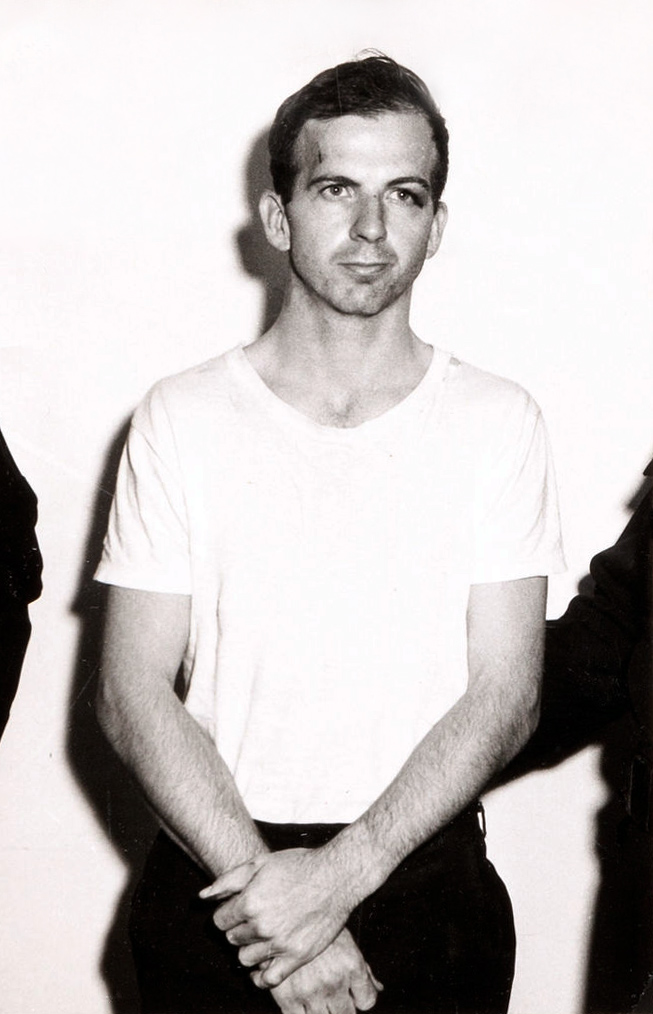
Lee Harvey Oswald

- October 1
  - George Archer, American golfer (d. 2005)
  - Mariah A. Taylor, founder of the North Portland Nurse Practitioner Community Health Clinic
- October 2
  - Paul Doyle, American baseball player (d. 2020)
  - George Reed, American football player (d. 2023)
- October 6
  - Michael Durrell, American actor
  - Ellen Travolta, American actress
- October 7
  - John Hopcroft, American computer scientist
  - Bill Snyder, American football coach
- October 8 – Lynne Stewart, American defense attorney (d. 2017)
- October 9
  - Willie Morrow, American businessman and inventor (d. 2022)
  - O. V. Wright, American singer (d. 1980)
- October 12 – Carolee Schneemann, American visual artist (d. 2019)
- October 13
  - T. J. Cloutier, American poker player
  - Melinda Dillon, American actress (d. 2023)
- October 14 – Ralph Lauren, American fashion designer
- October 15 – Peter Gotti, American mobster (d. 2021)
- October 18
  - Mike Ditka, American football player (d. 2026)
  - Lee Harvey Oswald, American assassin of John F. Kennedy (d. 1963)
- October 23 – Charles R. Morris, American lawyer, banker and author (d. 2021)
- October 24 – F. Murray Abraham, American actor
- October 25 – Zelmo Beaty, American basketball player (d. 2013)
- October 27 – Suzy Covey, American scholar of popular culture (d. 2007)
- October 28 – Jane Alexander, American actress
- October 30
  - Leland H. Hartwell, American scientist
  - Grace Slick, American rock singer (Jefferson Airplane)
- October 31 – Ron Rifkin, American actor

=== November ===
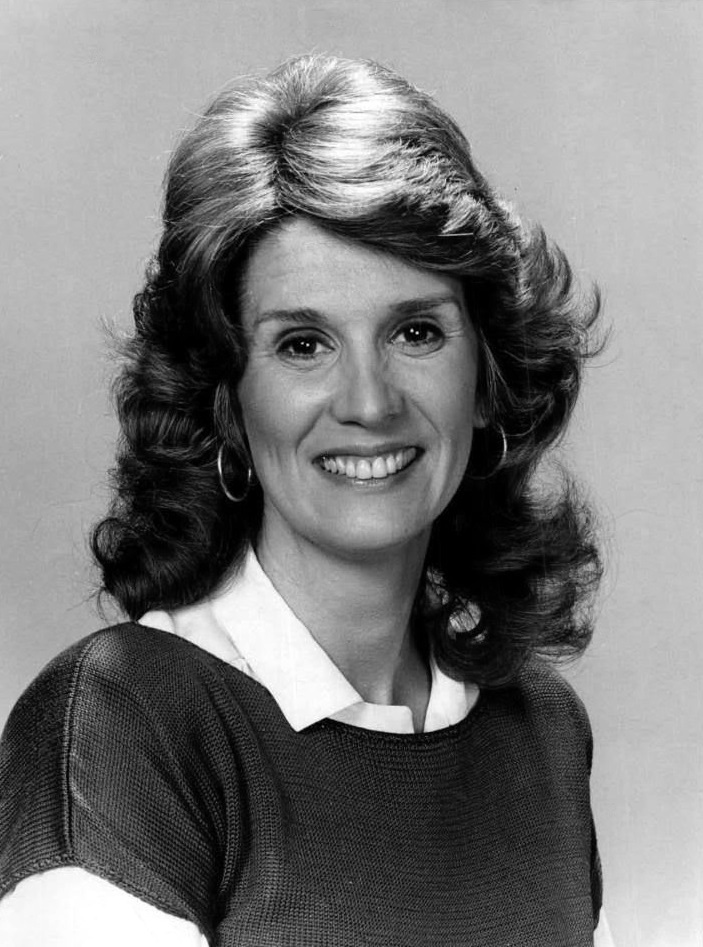
Barbara Bosson

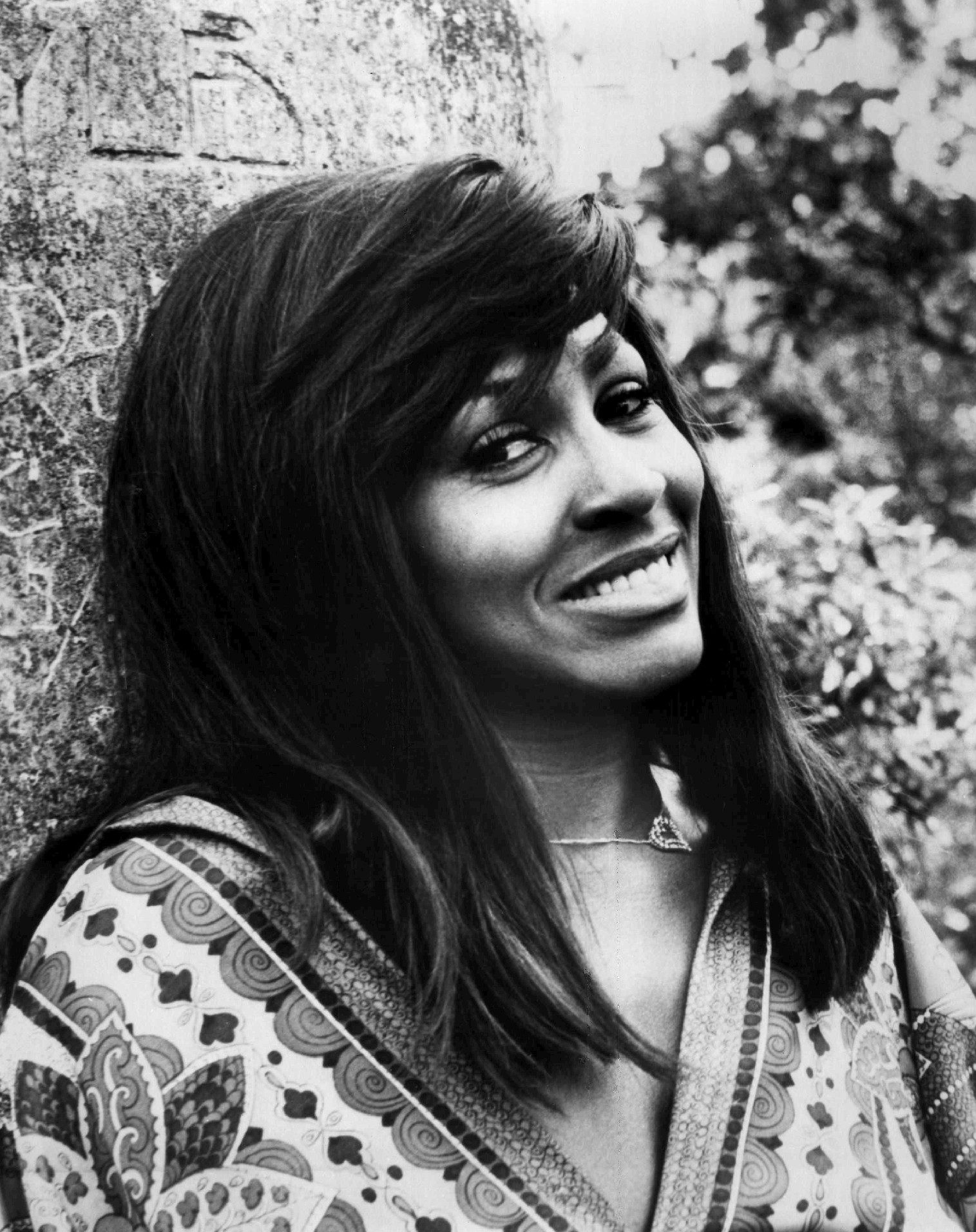
Tina Turner

- November 1 – Barbara Bosson, American actress (d. 2023)
- November 9 – Paul Cameron, American psychologist
- November 11 – Denise Alexander, American actress (d. 2025)
- November 14 – Wendy Carlos, American electronic composer
- November 15
  - Yaphet Kotto, African-American actor (d. 2021)
  - Thalmus Rasulala, American actor (d. 1991)
- November 18
  - Tom Johnson, American composer (d. 2024)
  - Larry Libertore, American football player (d. 2017)
  - John O'Keefe, American-born British neuroscientist
  - Liz J. Patterson, American politician (d. 2018)
  - Brenda Vaccaro, American actress
- November 19 – Tom Harkin, American politician
- November 20 – Dick Smothers, American actor, comedian
- November 21 – R. Budd Dwyer, American politician (d. 1987)
- November 23 – Betty Everett, African-American soul singer, pianist (d. 2001)
- November 26
  - Mark Margolis, American actor (d. 2023)
  - Tina Turner, American-born (later Swiss) singer and actress (d. 2023)
- November 27 – Dave Giusti, American baseball player (d. 2026)
- November 29
  - Peter Bergman, American comedian (d. 2012)
  - Joel Whitburn, American author and music historian (d. 2022)

=== December ===
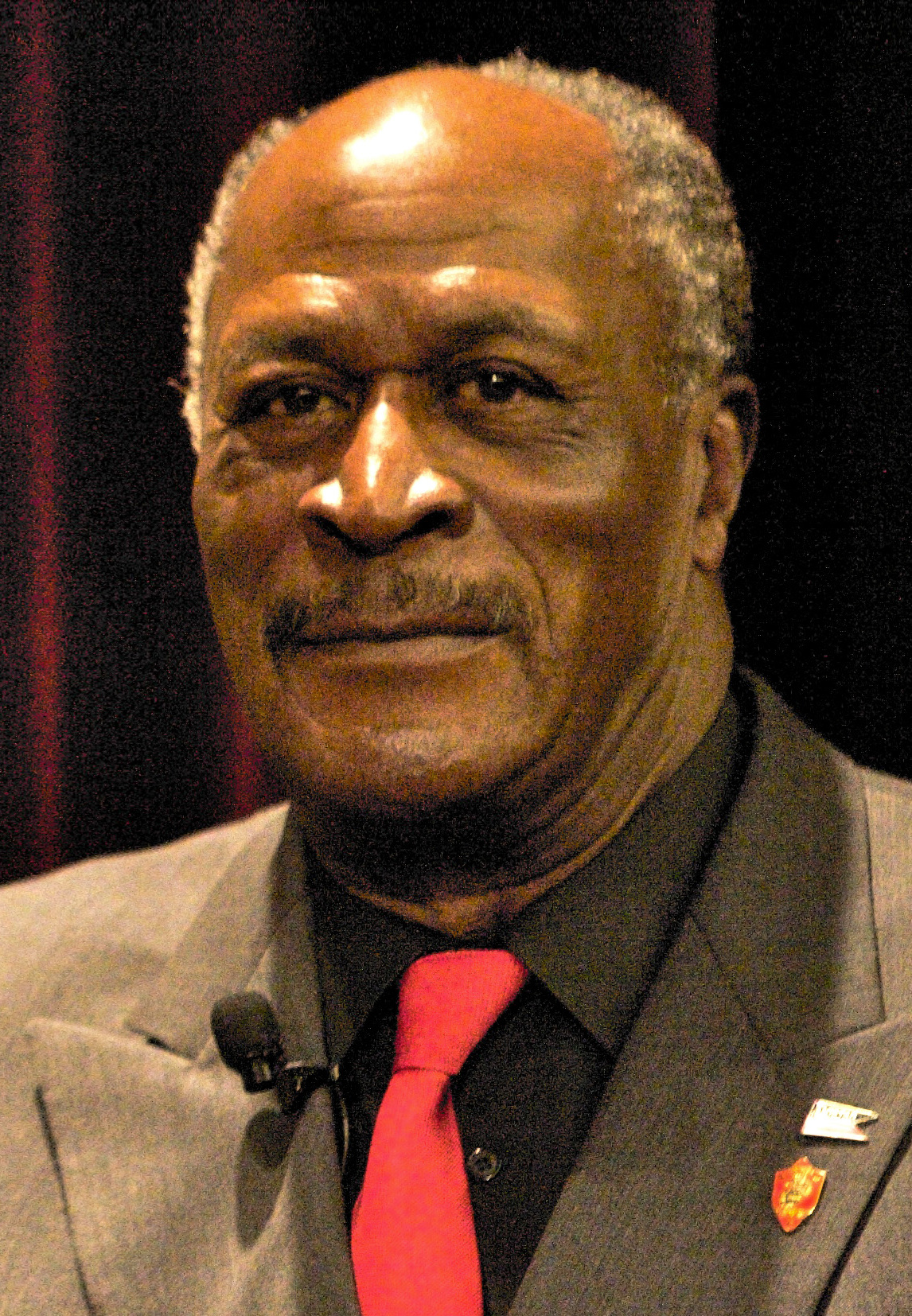
John Amos

- December 1 – Lee Trevino, American golfer
- December 2 – Harry Reid, American politician (d. 2021)
- December 4 – Pearl Fryar, American topiary artist d. 2026)
- December 8 – Jerry Butler, African-American singer-songwriter and politician (d. 2025)
- December 11
  - Tom Hayden, American academic, activist and politician (d. 2016)
  - Thomas McGuane, American author and screenwriter
- December 12 – Terry Kirkman, American singer-songwriter (d. 2023)
- December 14 – Ernie Davis, American football player (d. 1963)
- December 15 – Cindy Birdsong, African-American singer
- December 17 – Eddie Kendricks, African-American singer (The Temptations) (d. 1992)
- December 18 – Harold E. Varmus, American scientist, winner of the Nobel Prize for Medicine
- December 20 – Kathryn Joosten, American actress (d. 2012)
- December 22 – Jerry Pinkney, American illustrator of children's books (d. 2021)
- December 24 – Dean Corll, American serial killer, rapist, kidnapper and torturer (k. 1973)
- December 25
  - Don Alias, jazz percussionist (d. 2006)
  - Bob James, jazz keyboardist and arranger
- December 26 – Phil Spector, American record producer and murderer (d. 2021)
- December 27 – John Amos, African-American actor (d. 2024)
- December 29 – Ed Bruce, American country singer and actor (d. 2021)

=== Undated ===
- Michael O'Harro, American businessman

== Deaths ==
- January 8 – Charles Eastman, Native American author, physician, reformer, helped found the Boy Scouts of America (born 1858)
- January 13 – Arthur Barker, son of Ma Barker and a member of the Barker-Karpis gang (born 1899)
- January 25 – Helen Ware, stage and screen actress (born 1877)
- January 26 – Newell Sanders, businessman and politician (born 1850)
- February 17 – Fred Gamble, actor (born 1868)
- March 19 – Lloyd L. Gaines, civil rights activist (born 1911) (disappeared, presumed dead)
- April 6 – Bennie Dickson, bank robber (date of birth unknown)
- April 28 – Anne Walter Fearn, American physician (born 1867)
- May 2 – Phillips Smalley, actor and director (born 1865)
- May 10 – James Parrott, actor (born 1898)
- May 14 – Fanny Searls, American botanist (born 1851)
- May 20 – Joseph Carr, 2nd president of the National Football League (born 1880)
- May 23 – Witmer Stone, ornithologist and botanist (born 1866)
- May 27 – Alfred A. Cunningham, first United States Marine Corps aviator (born 1882)
- May 30 – Floyd Roberts, race car driver (born 1900)
- June 4 – Tommy Ladnier, jazz trumpeter (born 1900)
- June 6 – George Fawcett, actor (born 1860)
- June 9 – Owen Moore, actor (born 1886)
- June 16 – Chick Webb, musician (born 1905)
- June 19 – Grace Abbott, social worker and activist (born 1878)
- June 28
  - James William McCarthy, judge (born 1872)
  - Bobby Vernon, actor (born 1898)
- July 7 – Deacon White, baseball player and MLB Hall of Famer (born 1847)
- August 2 – Harvey Spencer Lewis, mystic (born 1883)
- August 23 – Sidney Howard, writer (born 1891)
- September 18 – Charles M. Schwab, steel magnate (born 1862)
- September 24 – James P. Boyle, politician (born 1885)
- September 26 – Kirtland Cutter, architect (born 1860)
- October 3 – Fay Templeton, musical comedy star (born 1865)
- October 6 – George Gaul, actor (born 1885)
- October 7 – Harvey Cushing, neurosurgeon (born 1869)
- October 13 – Ford Sterling, actor (born 1882)
- October 23 – Zane Grey, writer (born 1872)
- October 28 – Alice Brady, actress (born 1892)
- October 29 – Dwight B. Waldo, educator and historian (born 1864)
- November 13 – Lois Weber, actress (born 1881)
- November 16 – Pierce Butler, Associate Justice of the Supreme Court of the United States (born 1866)
- December 11 – John Harron, actor (born 1903)
- December 12 – Charles Rudolph Walgreen, businessman (born 1873)
- December 12 – Douglas Fairbanks, actor (born 1883)
- December 19 – Reginald F. Nicholson, United States Navy admiral (born 1852)
- December 22
  - Ma Rainey, blues singer (born 1886)
- December 26 – Blanche Butler Ames, First Lady of Mississippi (born 1847)
- Undated – Alfred Owen Crozier, attorney (born 1863)

== See also ==
- List of American films of 1939
- Timeline of United States history (1930–1949)
