= Mariah (given name) =

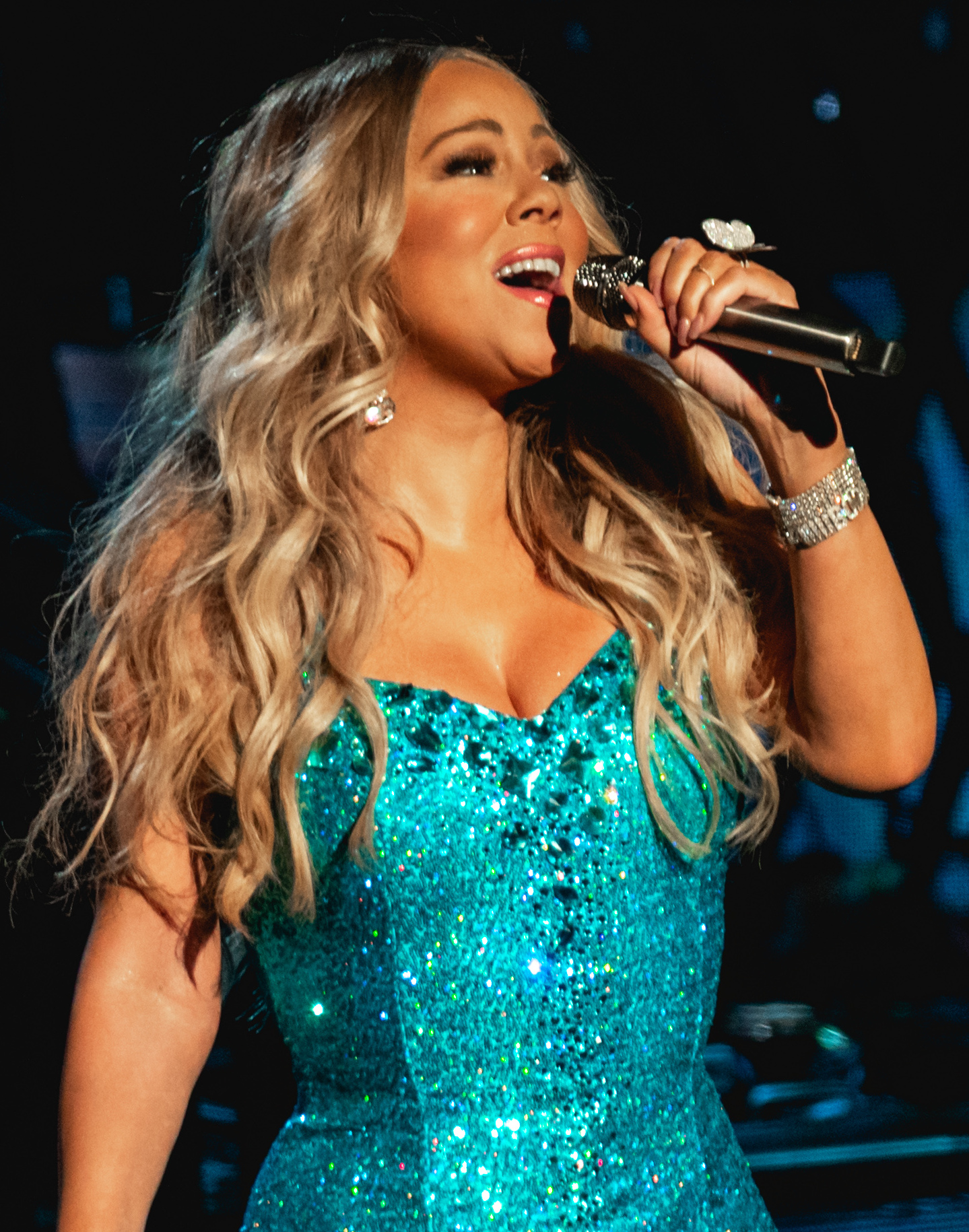
- Singer-songwriter Mariah Carey
- Gender: feminine
- Language: English

Other names
- Related names: Maria, Marie, Marija, Mariya

Mariah is a variation of the feminine name Maria. Its use in an English-language context suggests the pronunciation /məˈraɪə/ mə-RY-ə, i.e. the traditional English pronunciation of Latin Maria (as opposed to the Spanish/Italian-influenced pronunciation /məˈriːə/ mə-REE-ə now also commonly encountered in English).

The name was rarely given in the United States prior to the 1990s, when it rose in popularity from rank 562 in 1989 to rank 62 in 1998, in imitation of the name of singer-songwriter Mariah Carey (whose single "Vision of Love" topped the charts in 1990).

== People ==
- Mariah Angeliq (born 1999), American singer
- Mariah Paris Balenciaga (born 1982), American drag queen and television personality
- Mariah Bell (born 1996), American figure skater
- Mariah Bullock (born 1991), Samoan footballer
- Mariah Buzolin (born 1991), Brazilian actress
- Mariah Carey (born 1969), American singer-songwriter
- Mariah Duran (born 1996), American skateboarder
- Mariah Fujimagari (born 1994), Canadian ice hockey player
- Mariah Gale (born c.1980), British actress
- Mariah Idrissi (born 1992), British model, public speaker and online personality
- Mariah Lopez (born 1985), American activist
- Mariah May (born 1998), English professional wrestler, model and actress
- Mariah O'Brien (born 1971), American interior designer, actress and model
- Mariah Parker (born 1991), American rapper and labor organizer
- Mariah Reddick (1832–1922), American slave and midwife
- Mariah Stackhouse (born 1994), American professional golfer
- Mariah A. Taylor (born 1939), American nurse

=== Pseudonyms ===
- Mariah Fredericks, author of bestselling fiction books for teens
- Mariah the Scientist (born 1997), American singer
- Mariah Stewart, author of romantic fiction
- Mariah Sensuel, stage name of Finnish erotic actress Maria Kekkonen

=== Fictional characters ===
- Mariah (JoJo's Bizarre Adventure), a fictional character from the manga JoJo's Bizarre Adventure
- Mariah Copeland, a fictional character from the American soap opera, The Young and the Restless
- Mariah Dillard, a supervillain appearing in American comic books published by Marvel Comics
- Mariah Dillard Stokes, a main character in the American television series, Luke Cage
- Mariah Wong, a fictional character from the anime and manga series Beyblade
