= Svetlana Pesotskaya =

Russian television personality (born 1975)

- Born: Svetlana Pesotskaya; January 9, 1975 (age 51); Moscow, Russia
- Occupations: Reporter, Journalist

Svetlana Pesotskaya (born 9 January 1975) is a television reporter in Moscow who gained international attention for her practice of stripping during newscasts. Before becoming a television journalist, Pesotskaya was an actress and model.

After Communism, Russian television channels struggled to gain viewers because of low budgets and lack of programming. To attract viewers, the M1 Network began experimenting in November 1999 with having Pesotskaya strip while delivering the news. The ratings soared and the show, renamed Golaya Pravda (The Naked Truth), became the most widely viewed news program in Russia. Pesotskaya took off her clothes on camera daily with a pair of hands, strategically placed as the only thing to preserve her decency.

In an MTV documentary about curious television moments, she was wrongly identified as Deborah Norvilovich, a pun on Deborah Norville.

== See also ==
- Naked News
