= The Naked Truth (Russian TV program) =

Russian television series

- Presented by: Svetlana Pesotskaya
- Country of origin: Russia

Original release
- Network: M1

The Naked Truth (Russian: Голая правда, romanized: Golaya pravda) was a television program hosted by Svetlana Pesotskaya on Moscow's M1 television channel. The format was a ten-minute news bulletin, followed by a weather report.

After Communism, Russian television channels struggled to gain viewers because of low budgets and lack of programming. To attract viewers, the M1 channel began experimenting in November 1999 with having Pesotskaya strip while delivering the news. The concept was developed by M1 producer Sergei Moskvin, who stated that the show began life as a "one-off joke - a light-hearted send-up of Russian current affairs." Pesotskaya took off her clothes on camera daily with a pair of hands, strategically placed as the only thing covering her breasts. Golaya Pravda also featured a weather presenter/stripper and other reporters who bared their breasts completely. The show featured interviews with members of the State Duma, who were "vying to appear on the show", speaking to topless political correspondents. The program was broadcast from premises on Pravda Street in Moscow, on the same street as the main building of the Pravda newspaper, the official newspaper of the Communist Party of the Soviet Union, and in the building formerly housing Pravda's health and recreation building.

Moskvin considered that besides the titillation value, the dissonance of watching a woman undress and hearing serious news appealed to the Russians' sense of the absurd. Pesotskaya stated that "The idea of The Naked Truth was born during the last parliamentary elections, which were a real circus, a real striptease show." The Naked Truth became M1's flagship show, at a time when the station was Moscow's fastest-growing television channel, and was nominated for a television award for humour. Daya Kishan Thussu in his work News as Entertainment: The Rise of Global Infotainment, considered that The Naked Truth's success stemmed from the Russian media's new focus on the entertainment genre, with journalists adopting the role of entertainer. Pesotskaya argued that "almost every other Russian newscast was just copied from Western television. We were the first to introduce a non-standard approach to the news. In the other shows, the news readers are too serious."

The owners of М1 stated that they had sold broadcasting rights to the idea in Britain and France. Forbes considered the program an example of Russia as a "country of bizarre television".

== See also ==
- Naked News
