= Samantha Page =

- Born: August 13, 1983
- Known for: Naked News

Samantha Page was a newscaster on Naked News. She was born and raised in England, and graduated in psychology and zoology, while also earning a black belt in Shotokan karate. She joined the cast in February 2003, becoming the first British newscaster, and left the show in August 2005.
