= Naked News =

Canadian news and entertainment website

- Genre: News; Entertainment; Adult website
- Created by: Fernando Pereira; Kirby Stasyna
- Presented by: Eila Adams; Madison Banes; Alana Blaire; Laura Desiree; Tia Larose; Marina Valmont; Frankie Kennedy; Isabella Rossini; Serenity Cox
- Country of origin: Canada
- Original language: English

Production
- Producer: Lucas Tyler
- Production location: Toronto
- Running time: 20 minutes

Original release
- Release: December 1999 – present

Naked News is a Canadian news and entertainment program owned by Naked Broadcasting Network. It features nude female news presenters reading news bulletins derived from news wires. The show's production studio is located in Toronto. There are six daily news programs a week and they are approximately 20 minutes long. The female cast members either read the news fully nude, or disrobe as they present their various segments, including entertainment, sports, movies, food, sex, and relationships. Naked News TV! is an offshoot of the web program and is broadcast on pay TV in various countries around the world. The show recruits women from around the world to appear on a regular basis or as guest reporters, and their auditions are included in the program. Another segment of the show is Naked in the Streets in which a reporter appears topless in the street and asks the public about various topics.

== History ==
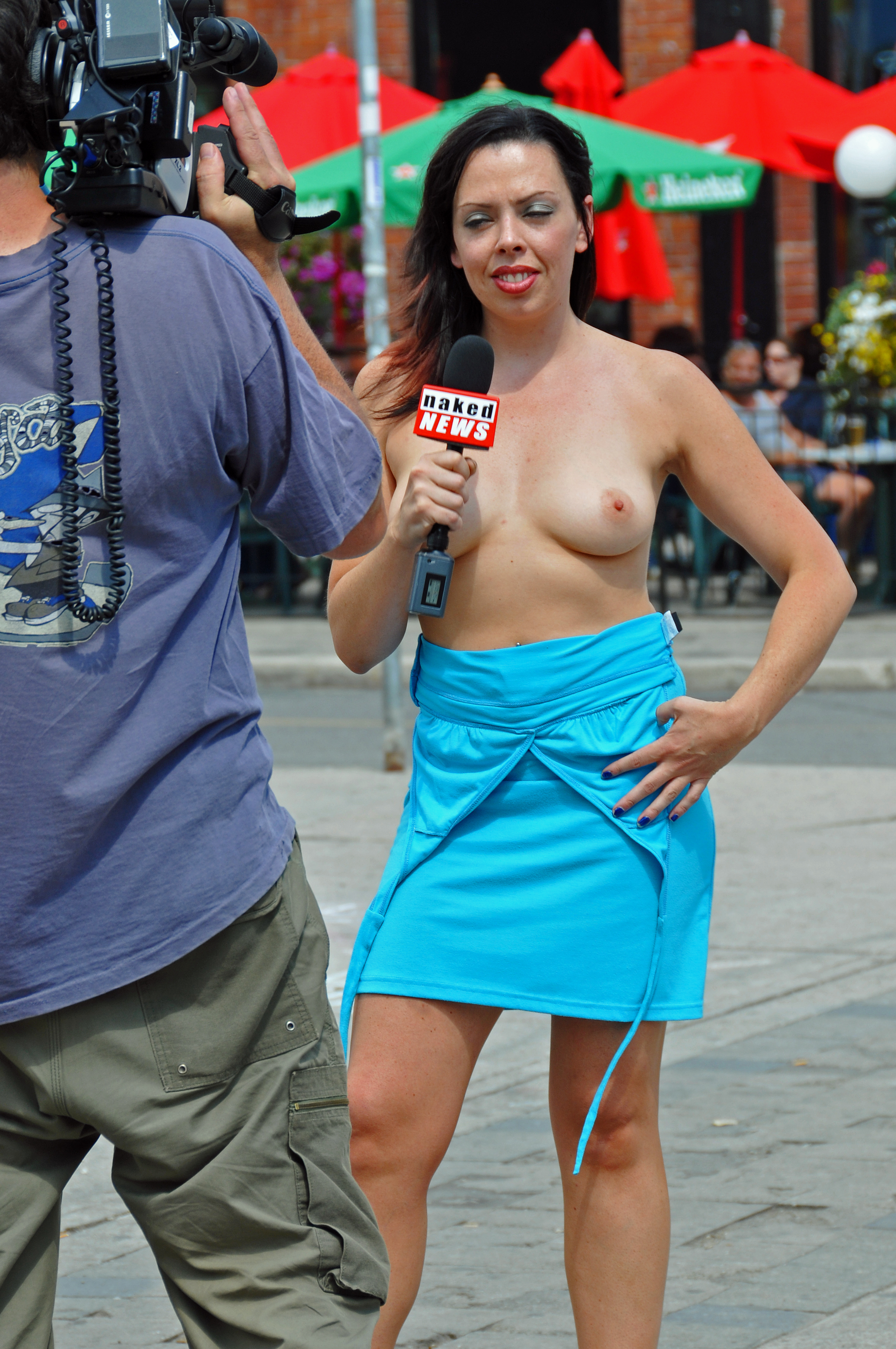
Then-Naked News anchor Christine Kerr, in Toronto (Canada), 2008

Naked News was conceived by Fernando Pereira and Kirby Stasyna and debuted in December 1999 as a web-based news service featuring an all-female cast.

It began with only one anchor, Victoria Sinclair, who worked for the program until 2015. As the show grew, the number of female anchors increased. Roxanne West joined Sinclair as a lead anchor, and other cast members included Holly Weston, April Torres, Lily Kwan, Sandrine Renard, Erin Sherwood, Athena King, Brooke Roberts, Michelle Pantoliano, Erica Stevens, Samantha Page, Christine Kerr and Valentina Taylor, plus guest anchors.

The website was popularized entirely by word of mouth, and quickly became a popular web destination. During the height of its popularity, the website was receiving over 6 million unique visitors per month. In the site's early days, the entire newscast could be viewed for free online. The site was initially supported by advertising, but this changed after the collapse of Internet advertising that occurred with the dot-com crash. By 2002, only one news segment could be viewed for free, and by 2004, no free content remained on the website. Beginning in 2005, a nudity-free version of Naked News was available to non-subscribers. Beginning in June 2008, two news segments could be viewed for free. However, this ended in December 2009.

In 2001, following the success of The Naked Truth, a similar show on Russian television, the Naked News website launched Naked News TV!, a 45-minute show initially broadcast on the pay-per-view cable television channel Viewers Choice in Canada. It was broadcast in the United States a few months later by the iN DEMAND cable TV service on its Too Much for TV pay-per-view network that also included Girls Gone Wild. In 2002, it was broadcast in Australia on The Comedy Channel via cable and satellite television platforms Foxtel and Austar. The British channel Sumo TV briefly showed episodes of Naked News, while the free-to-view Playboy One broadcast the show at 9:30pm Mondays-Fridays until its closure in 2008.

A male version of the show ran from 2001 until 2007. It was created to parallel the female version, but ceased production as it did not enjoy the female version's popularity and fame. Although it was originally targeted towards female viewers (at one point said to be 30% of the website's audience), the male show later promoted itself as news from a gay perspective.

In August 2004, in Britain, Naked News began to be shown at 21:30 GMT every night on the Get Lucky TV channel, accessed on Sky Digital.

By 2008, Naked News TV! was available on pay-per-view in the US, Europe, Australia, Asia and Canada, while the Naked News website had viewers in more than 172 nations

== In the media ==
In the 2000s, Naked News was the subject of a UK-funded documentary called Naked News - Backstage.

In 2013, Naked News was the subject of an eight-part documentary series called Naked News Uncovered, which was broadcast on Super Channel in Canada.

The female announcers have been featured on CBS Sunday Morning, The Today Show, The View, Sally Jessy Raphaël, and numerous appearances on Entertainment Tonight and ET Insider, newspapers and magazines (TV Guide, Playboy), and as guests on several radio shows, including Howard Stern.

On-screen performers with concurrent music careers, for example, have used a second stage name, such as "Roxanne O’Neill".

== Similar shows ==
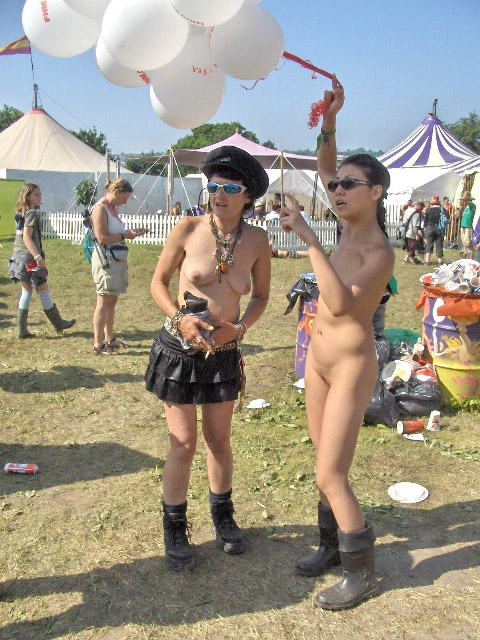
Naked News presenter Lily Kwan (right)

In the late 1990s, British cable television channel L!VE TV broadcast Tiffani's Big City Tips, in which model Tiffani Banister gave the financial news while stripping to her underwear.

=== International licensing ===
- Naked News launched a Japanese version of the show in 2006. Sunrise Corp. CEO Takuya Uchikawa and Naked News owner eGalaxy Multimedia CEO David Warga partnered the venture, starting with Naked News content using Japanese subtitles. Japanese broadcasting regulations prohibited the presenters from being fully naked, allowing them only to strip to their underwear. In 2007, the Japanese government changed broadcasting guidelines to prevent the show receiving a subsidy for the section delivered in sign language.
- In 2008, licensing negotiations were underway to produce an Italian-language version of the show in Milan, a Spanish-language version in Mexico and Korean-language version in South Korea.
- In June 2009, plans for Naked News Korea were announced. It featured a similar format to the Canadian version but with less nudity. This was later revealed to be a scam. After barely a month of operations, Naked News Korea, which featured topless news anchors, abruptly closed down amid allegations that the company's two heads, an Israeli entrepreneur, Yoav Sinai and a New Zealand investor of Chinese descent, CEO John Chau (Chow) left the country without paying deferred salaries. Although Chau bought the naming rights from the Naked News, it was never an official subsidiary of the Toronto-based Canadian company.

=== Imitators ===
- Comédie+ – In 2001, this French cable TV network ran a series promos featuring males and females casually undressing as they read jokes. In 2006 they copied the Naked News format more closely in a striptease newscast called Les Nuz, in which the anchors read the news wearing only their bottom underwear.
- Radio Tango – In 2001 this radio station based in Oslo, Norway began featuring stripping female weather readers in their broadcasts and on their website.
- In 2001–2002, Bulgarian cable network M-SAT had its own equivalent, based on the Russian show The Naked Truth. In its first week, its ratings surpassed the late edition of state television's Po sveta i u nas. It was the first time a cable television program surpassed Bulgarian National Television in ratings, which led to M-SAT gaining more subscribers. The Bulgarian Orthodox Church raised concerns over the program. On 1 January 2002, its length increased from ten minutes to fifteen. On 11 January 2002, M-SAT stopped airing the program for unknown reasons, but the Council for Electronic Media thought it was due to accusations of plagiarism from the Russian version.
- A very similar phenomenon by the name "Noodie News" appears in Canadian Margaret Atwood's 2003 novel Oryx and Crake.
- Počasíčko (diminutive of "weather") was Czech TV Nova's past-10PM featurette launched in January 1998 where a nude woman (or occasionally, a man) got dressed in clothing appropriate for the next day's weather forecast. This was discontinued after several years and returned as web-only in February 2007. When Nova launched a new online portal in May 2008, it included a "Red News" section causing controversy; asked about the Naked News, they denied securing license and stressed Počasíčko's primacy.
- In March 2010, students at the University of Cambridge presented a news segment on Cambridge University Television in the nude.
- French spoof news site Les Graves Infos (Serious News) was launched in mid-2009 with a stripping weather girl. The site closed in February 2010.
- In June 2014, a very similar show was released in Venezuela called Desnudando la Noticia (Stripping the News) which is a variant of Naked News.
- Playboy TV imitated the format with its news program The Weekend Flash.
- In Portugal, a five-minute news bulletin fronted by a naked woman, titled Nutícias, premiered on 22 April 2002 on cable station SIC Radical. The show was canceled in 2003.
- A Finnish copy of the Naked News concept was broadcast on the country's Aluetelevisio cable television channel. The show employed erotic actress Maria Kekkonen as a reporter. A former porn actress, Rakel Liekki, also worked for the show.

=== Parodies ===
- A 2005 episode of the satirical New Zealand news show Eating Media Lunch depicted newsreaders having sex in a parody of Naked News called "Fuck News".
