= Bennie and Stella Dickson =

Depression-era US outlaws

Bennie (born in Topeka, Kansas – died April 6, 1939) and Stella Mae Irwin Dickson (August 25, 1922, Topeka, Kansas – September 10, 1995 in Missouri) were Depression-era outlaws and bank robbers in the United States. They successfully stole over $50,000 in an eight-month period from August 1938 to April 1939.

A husband and wife team in the style of Bonnie and Clyde, Bennie Dickson and his newlywed wife "Sure Shot" Stella began their criminal career on Stella's 16th birthday by robbing a bank in Elkton, South Dakota of $2,174 on August 25, 1938. Two months later, they stole $47,233 in cash and bonds from a bank in Brookings, South Dakota on October 31.

Although tracked by police to a tourist campground in Topeka, Kansas, the Dicksons were able to escape after a brief gunfight when officers attempted to arrest them on November 24. Separated during the escape, Bennie drove his car to South Clinton, Iowa, and after stealing another car, doubled back to Topeka to meet Stella at a rendezvous on November 25. Traveling to Michigan, several attempts over the next few days were made by authorities to capture them, including one incident in which Stella shot the tires out on a pursuing patrol car (earning her the moniker "Sure Shot" Stella). After taking three men hostage, Bennie and Stella were able to steal getaway cars in Michigan and Indiana, later eluding police on the countryside backroads.

Shortly after arriving in St. Louis, Bennie was shot and killed by arresting FBI agents while at a hamburger stand on April 6, 1939, with Stella being arrested in Kansas City the following day. Taken back to South Dakota to stand trial, Stella was convicted of two federal counts of bank robbery and sentenced to ten years imprisonment.

Stella Dickson remained behind bars until she was 26. She later lived in Raytown, Missouri, where she worked as a grocery store clerk and was married several times. She died of emphysema at age 72, in 1995.

Their story is also the inspiration for the name of the Brookings, South Dakota micro-brewery, "Heist Brewing Company".
