= Roger McMurrin =

American conductor and pastor (1939–2023)

The Reverend Roger Grant McMurrin
- Born: Roger Grant McMurrin; August 7, 1939; Bedford, Indiana, U.S.
- Died: December 13, 2023 (aged 84); Lebanon, Ohio, U.S.
- Education: Olivet Nazarene University; Ohio State University
- Occupations: Music teacher; Conductor; Pastor
- Spouse: Diane McMurrin
- Children: 2

Roger Grant McMurrin (August 7, 1939 – December 13, 2023) was an American conductor and Presbyterian pastor who moved to Ukraine and founded a symphony orchestra there to perform sacred music.

== Early life ==
McMurrin was born in Bedford, Indiana. As a youth he moved to Xenia, Ohio. He earned a degree in music from Olivet Nazarene University and became a teacher at Xenia High School. He then earned a master's degree from Ohio State University. He later became a music instructor at a college where he also studied conducting techniques.

== Musical career ==
=== United States ===
McMurrin began his music career in 1972 at Coral Ridge Presbyterian Church in Fort Lauderdale, Florida, and later became its director of music. After 16 years at Coral Ridge, McMurrin left to become director of music at Highland Park Presbyterian Church in Dallas, Texas and then moved on to First Presbyterian Church in Orlando, Florida.

McMurrin had also performed on Diane Bish's The Joy of Music, including as part of the Coral Ridge choir during an episode about the life of John Wesley.

=== Ukraine ===
In 1991, McMurrin was invited to Kiev, Ukraine by Episcopal priest George McCammon to conduct local musicians in a performance of Georg Friedrich Händel's Messiah. McMurrin had initially planned to go to the Caribbean and was familiar with Kiev only from The Great Gate of Kiev from Pictures at an Exhibition. Upon arrival in 1992, McMurrin became aware that the Ukrainians had not heard Handel's Messiah before, as it had been banned by the Soviet Union. McMurrin conducted the musicians in performing two concerts, in which Messiah was performed for the first time in Ukraine in 70 years. During the plane ride back to the United States, McMurrin felt that God wanted him to move to Ukraine. McMurrin moved to Ukraine permanently in 1993, and taught English and musical theory at St. Andrew's Preparatory School. In December McMurrin had to return to the United States as he only had $16 left. Friends gave McMurrin money for him to return to Ukraine, where he set up the Kyiv Symphony Orchestra and Chorus, the first private orchestra in Ukraine. The orchestra later went on tours of Ukraine and the United States.

In 1994, McMurrin established the Church of the Holy Trinity as a place for the orchestra to play, and became an ordained pastor in the process. At the time, most of the orchestra members were atheists or agnostics; however, a group of them became Christians after performing Christian music with McMurrin. McMurrin became the pastor of the church, which gained funding as a result of the Orange Revolution.

The following year, Roger McMurrin and his wife Dianne founded Music Mission Kiev, a Christian relief organization which is associated with the Kyiv Symphony Orchestra and Chorus.

== Personal life ==
McMurrin was the son of the Reverend Albert McMurrin. McMurrin was a Christian and an ordained minister in the Presbyterian Church. He was married and had two sons. McMurrin died on December 13, 2023, at the age of 84.
