= Judith Appelbaum =

- Born: September 26, 1939; New York, U.S.
- Died: July 25, 2018 (aged 78); Bedford, New York, U.S.
- Education: Vassar College
- Occupations: Editor, consultant, author

Judith Appelbaum (September 26, 1939 – July 25, 2018) was an American editor, consultant and author. She was active in the publishing industry for 50 years and was awarded both the Publishers Marketing (now the Independent Book Publishers) Association Lifetime Achievement Award and the Book Industry Study Group Lifetime Service Award.

== Education ==
Appelbaum grew up in New York. She graduated from Vassar College in 1960. As a college student, she interned at the publishing company that is now HarperCollins.

== Career ==
After graduating from Vassar, her first position was at Harper's magazine. Initially tasked with minor duties, by the 1970s, she began writing general-interest articles for the magazine. She later worked at Harper's Weekly (1974–76) and was managing editor of Publishers Weekly. Growing more empathetic to "struggling writers", the inner workings of the publishing industry became the focus of her writing.

In 1978, she released her most influential book How To Get Happily Published, which showed would-be authors how to publish and market their books. It sold over 500,000 copies and ran to five editions. Following the success of the book, she left her position at Publishers Weekly and co-founded Sensible Solutions, a consulting firm to support authors and publishers. In 1980, Appelbaum published The Writer's Workbook: A Full and Friendly Guide to Boosting Your Book's Sales.

In addition, Appelbaum was a columnist and reviewer for The New York Times Book Review, and a member of the faculty of the University of Denver's Publishing Institute. Previously the editor of the monthly publication of the Independent Book Publishers Association (IBPA) and the IBPA's Independent magazine, she was also the secretary and a member of the board of directors of Book Industry Study Group (BISG) and a member of its executive committee. Appelbaum also chaired the BISG's marketing committee and co-chaired of its rights committee. She was the recipient of the Publishing Marketing Association's Lifetime Achievement Award and the winner of the BISG Lifetime Service Award.

== Death ==
She died on July 25, 2018, at the age of 78 of ovarian cancer.

== Publications ==
- How To Get Happily Published: A Complete and Candid Guide, Fifth Edition. HarperCollins, 1978, ISBN 978-0-45-226125-9
- The question of size in the book industry today, Bowker, 1978
- The writer's workbook: a full and friendly guide to boosting your book's sales, co-written with Florence Janovic, Pushcart Press, 1980, ISBN 978-0-916366-69-8
- Books that sold a million or more, Book Research Quarterly (1987) 3: 40
- We Used to Call It Publishing-New Intellectual Property Pathways, Appelbaum, Judith; Paul, Sandra K.; and Simmonds, Albert (1999), Against the Grain: Vol. 11: Iss. 2, Article 32.
