= Larry LeGrande =

American baseball player 1939–2023)

- Catcher / Outfielder
- Born: May 25, 1939; Roanoke, Virginia, U.S.
- Died: April 13, 2023 (aged 83); Roanoke, Virginia, U.S.
- Batted: Left Threw: Right

Larry Edwin LeGrande Sr. (May 25, 1939 – April 13, 2023) was an American professional baseball catcher and outfielder who played in the Negro leagues and in Minor League Baseball.

== Baseball career ==
LeGrande graduated from Carver High School in Salem, Virginia. The school did not have a baseball team and he played for the Webster All-Stars in Blue Ridge, Virginia. Scouts for the Memphis Red Sox of the Negro American League noticed LeGrande, and he signed with them after completing a three-week tryout prior to graduating from high school. LeGrande made his professional debut for Memphis in 1957. The next season, he played for the Detroit Stars. He was chosen to participate in the 1958 East-West All-Star Game. In 1959, LeGrande played for the Kansas City Monarchs.

At the end of the 1959 season, LeGrande signed with the New York Yankees. They intended for him to play for Greensboro Yankees of the Carolina League in 1960, but due to the attention drawn by the Greensboro sit-ins, the Yankees assigned him to the St. Petersburg Saints of the Florida State League instead. Though LeGrande had a .304 batting average for St. Petersburg, the Yankees released LeGrande during the season rather than pay off the $2,500 remainder of his contract to the Monarchs. After his release, LeGrande returned to the Monarchs. From 1961 to 1963, he played for Satchel Paige's All-Stars, a barnstorming team.

== Later life ==
LeGrande returned to Roanoke where he worked as a wireman for General Electric. After 33 years, he retired in 1997. In 2002, LeGrande was inducted into the Salem-Roanoke Baseball Hall of Fame.

LeGrande and his wife, Mary, were married for 60 years. He died from complications of lung and bone cancer on April 13, 2023, at the age of 83.
