= Michael O'Harro =

Michael O'Harro (born 1939) is an American businessman.

In 1975 O'Harro opened Tramp's Discothèque in Washington D.C., one of America's first and most successful discos. In 1983, along with partner Jim Desmond, opened the first Champions Sports Bar. He is the founder of the International Discothèque Association.

He appears in the poster "Poverty Sucks", one of the best-selling posters in history.

O'Harro is an honorary member of The National Football League Players Association (NFLPA), the first non-player ever given this status. He has donated $250,000 worth of memorabilia to the Smithsonian's National Air and Space Museum.
