= Maria Kekkonen =

Finnish erotic actress

- Born: Maria Pauliina Kekkonen; 15 December 1976 (age 49); Helsinki, Finland
- Other names: Mariah, Mariah Sensuel
- Height: 1.75 m (5 ft 9 in)

Maria Pauliina Kekkonen a.k.a. Mariah Sensuel (born 15 December 1976 in Helsinki) is a Finnish erotic actress. She worked as a stripper for about six months before becoming an erotic actress in 1996. Kekkonen has also worked as a reporter on the Finnish Aluetelevisio television channel's clone of Naked News concept.

In November 2007 along with partner Olha Venäläinen, a former ballet dancer, Kekkonen introduced pole dancing to Helsinki at their studio "Rock The Pole". According to the University of Tampere article, various dance types, jazz, flamenco and ballet, are taught on the pole with students ranging from 16 to 50. The focus of the training is on athletic and gymnastic aspects of pole dancing, excluding erotic elements. By December classes were full and a series of children's classes were planned for the spring of 2008. She also received credit as a pole dance instructor for a modern dance group work Freak-a-Zo! which had its world premiere in Helsinki in September 2007.

== Filmography ==
- Nordic Debutantes 2 (1997, Max's)
- Mariah sensuel (1998, Kullervo Koivisto)
- Amatööri 4 (1998, Kullervo Koivisto)
- Henry the Great & 3 Wicked Virgins (1998, Henry Saari)
- Pige onani (1999, Dogma Video)
- Finish Nights (2000, S.E.V.P.)
- Hot Girls 10 (2001, S.E.V.P.)
- Danish Swingers (2001, S.E.V.P.)
- Mariana (2002, S.E.V.P)
- Rocks That Ass 20 (2002, Sean Michaels)
- Teeny Hunt vol 2 (2003, Seventeen)
- Young Gods (2003)
- Pornfolio Mariah (2004, Mariah Production)
- Pornfolio Saana (2004, Mariah Production)
- Filthy Passion (1999, Mariah Production)
- Show Time (Mariah Production)
- Truth or Dare (Mariah Production)
- Highlights 2 (S.E.V.P.)
- Total Lesbian (S.E.V.P.)
- Erotic Fuck World (Erotic World Production)
- Amateurs 3-4 (Kullervo Koivisto)
- Parkkipirkko Nelli (Kullervo Koivisto)
- Sex reporter Finland (SVD)
- Club Extas (Razzel Video)
- Sluts of Scandinavia 2 (Razzel Video)
- XXX-pimuja skandinaviassa (Razzel Video)
- 150 Nordiska kaskader (Max's)
- Heja Finland (Max's)
- Norden suger (Max's)
- Nordisk bakvärk (Max's)
- Nordiska nybörjare 6 (Max's)
- Nordiska sötsaker (Max's)
- Nordiska sötsaker 2 (Max's)
- Solo 3 (Max's)
- Solo 4 (Max's)
- Super Max's magazine 9 (Max's)
- Super Max's magazine 10 (Max's)
- Super Max's magazine 11 (Max's)
- Super Max's magazine 12 (Max's)
- Supershow DVD Sampler (Max's)
- Finska Gigant (Max's)
- Het så in i Norden (Max's)
- Nordiska Sexeliten (Max's)
- Maria la finlandesa (Papillon Films)
- Vex Models Maria Vol 1 (Vex HC)
- Dreamhouse for Sale (Eden)
- Best of Mariah
- Hard-on video magazine no. 1
