= Suzy Covey =

American comic book scholar

Suzanne J Covey
- Born: October 27, 1939
- Died: October 17, 2007 (aged 67); United States
- Education: Florida State University
- Scientific career
- Workplaces: University of Florida

Suzy Covey (Shaw) (October 27, 1939 – October 17, 2007) was an American comics scholar, whose work examined intersections of comics, technology, and sound, including Internet studies and studies of the Comic Book Markup Language (a specialized XML for encoding the images, text, and sound effects depicted in comics). In honor of her work with its comic collections, the Smathers Libraries renamed them the Suzy Covey Comic Book Collection in Special Collections in 2007.

After retiring in 2006 from the University of Florida George A. Smathers Libraries as a university librarian emerita, Suzy Covey's comic studies scholarship was enhanced by her work with computers during the early days of the Internet and her scholarship on music, which followed her undergraduate music studies and her own work as a musician, where she played as a band member on the "Bruce Springstone: Live at Bedrock" parody record, released in 1982. The A-side features "Bedrock Rap/Meet the Flintstones" (3:01), a parody of Springsteen singing the Flintstones theme; the B-side is a Springsteenesque arrangement of "Take Me Out to the Ballgame" (2:41) which is included on the CD collection Baseball's Greatest Hits. The record sold 35,000 copies and received airplay on rock and college radio. Her musical experience and expertise, along with her technical skills led Suzy Covey to use early bulletin board systems (BBS) and Internet discussion forums to discuss music, comics, and technology. Her role in these discussions and in early Internet studies helped to support and focus her comics research. She studied at Florida State University.

== Presentations and Publications ==
- Presentation (listed as Suzy Shaw Covey) "Soldier to Cartoon: Springsteen as Depicted in Comics," Glory days, a Bruce Springsteen symposium sponsored by Penn State University, Sept. 10, 2005, Long Branch, N.J. (Available from MSU's Comics Collection and Listed in MSU's Comics Bibliography.) Conference web page.
- 2006 Comic Art Conference, "A. Why is Jack Smilin'? Data Mining XML-coded Comic Strips OR B. Heroes and Villains: The Golden Era of Comic Strip Advertising"
- Presenter University of Florida Comics Conference 2004: Simultaneity and Sequentiality, Beyond the Balloon: Sound Effects and Background Text in Lynn Johnston's For Better or For Worse, By Suzanne J. Covey
- Article in ImageTexT
- "The Internet as an Entertainment System," Bulletin of the American Society for Information Science, October/November 1994, p. 9-11.
- The Administration of Library Owned Computer Files, Association for Research Libraries, 1989 (OMS SPEC Kit and Flyer, #159).
- "A Model MRDF Management Facility," co-author: Covey, III, William C.; Proceedings of the Annual Meeting of the American Society for Information Science, 1989, p. 53-58.
- "CAI in Libraries: Using Microcomputers to Train Staff," Computers in Libraries, vol. 9, no. 12, December 1989, p. 27-33.
- "Using CAI to Train Library Staff on Microcomputers," Library Software Review, January/February 1998, p. 23.
- How to Search OCLC [computer-assisted-instruction program in IBM PC BASIC], co-author: McIntyre, Terrence D. Bethea, Sally Brook; University of Florida, 1984, 1985.
- COMCAT at UF: Final Report, University of Florida Libraries, 1976.
- Presentation "University of Florida Home Page and Academic Home Pages," Data Day Symposium, University of Florida, March 1995, Gainesville, Florida.
- Presentation "The Library/Librarian's Role in Campus-Wide Information Systems and Networks," Panelist (with S. Trickey, J. Corey, D. Canelas and D. Beaubien), UFLA, November 1993, Gainesville, Florida.
- "A Modern MRDF Management Facility," Presenter, contributed paper, ASIS National Conference, October 1989, Washington D.C..
- Presentation "VACUUM: Lotus 1-2-3 Templates for Student Time Cards and Payroll," RTSD Technical Services Administrators of Medium-Sized Libraries Discussion Group, ALA Annual Conference, June 1987, San Francisco, California.
- Presentation "Using Microcomputers to Train Library Staff," SCIL Conference and Exhibition, March 1987, Washington DC.
- Presentation "Microcomputers as Training Aids in Technical Services," RTSD Technical Services Administrators of Medium-Sized Libraries Discussion Group, ALA Midwinter meeting, January 1985, Washington DC.
