= Mariah A. Taylor =

American nurse

Mariah A. Taylor, MSN, RN, CPNP (born 1 October 1939, in Atlanta, Texas), is the co-founder of the North Portland Nurse Practitioner Community Health Clinic in Portland, Oregon, the first Black-owned community-based nurse practitioner clinic in the country.

== Early life ==
Taylor was born to Geneva and Isaac Allen into a family of 24 siblings.

== Education ==
Taylor received her ADN and LPN certification from the Portland Community College Licensed Practical Nurse Program in 1972. She achieved her bachelor's degree in nursing from Southern Oregon State College in Ashland, Oregon in 1977. She earned her master's degree in nursing and certification as a pediatric nurse practitioner from the University of Colorado Medical Center in Denver, Colorado in 1979. She received her PhD from Linfield University in McMinnville, Oregon in 1992.

== North Portland Nurse Practitioner Community Health Clinic ==
In 1982 Taylor opened her well-baby clinic in North Portland, which since inception has served the neediest clients of all kinds in the greater Portland metropolitan area. In 1984, the clinic became a United Way agency. The most common health problems treated at the clinic have been poverty-related, with funding coming from donations and foundations. The clinic has also provided fresh produce, milk and clothes to the community.

== Community Activities ==
Despite being on a fixed income herself, Mariah regularly donates food to the homeless communities in Portland.

== Recognition ==
Taylor has won Oprah Winfrey's Angel Network Use Your Life award, 2000.
