= M1 (Russian TV channel) =

Russian TV channel for women

- Country: Russia
- Broadcast area: Moscow

Programming
- Picture format: 4:3 SDTV

Ownership
- Owner: CTC Media

History
- Launched: 13 February 1995; 30 years ago
- Closed: 6 March 2005; 20 years ago
- Former names: 1995-1999: Channel 31

Links
- Website: (only in Russia)

Availability

Terrestrial
- Ultra high frequency: Channel 31

M1 was a former television station in Moscow, which broadcast on the UHF band. The station started test broadcasts in 1994, becoming permanent on February 13, 1995, under the name Channel 31. On December 11, 1999, the channel was renamed M1 (First Moscovite) and was shut down in 2005 in order for STS to launch Domashny.

== History ==
The TV company AOZT "Teleexpress-31-iy kanal" (Телеэкспресс — 31-й канал) was founded in 1994, in which it started broadcasting test transmissions for the channel of the same name that year. It was conceived by members of the Russian Filmmakers Guild to air non-American movies. One of the planned names was Седьмое небо (Seventh Heaven). The founders were the Main Center for Radio and Television of the Ministry of Communications, the "Evrosib-Saint Petersburg" company (structure based on the October Railway, owned by the Russian Orthodox Church), as well as the "Studia raz, dva, tri" creative association (V. Sinelnikov) and several other secondary founders.

The channel started broadcasting on February 13, 1995.

In August 1998, GCRT sold its shares to the independent oil company Lukoil.

On December 11, 1999, the channel was renamed M1. In line with this, the channel appointed a new general director: former TV6 executive director Sergey Moskvin.
