= Herbert Gauls =

German photographer (1930–2017)

- Born: 13 August 1930; Koblenz, Germany
- Died: 17 January 2017 (aged 86); Germany
- Occupation: Photographer
- Years active: 1964–2017

Herbert Gauls (13 August 1930 in Koblenz – 17 January 2017) was a German photographer.

== Biography ==
Herbert Gauls visited the Kaiser Wilhelm Real Gymnasium in Koblenz and in 1946 he spent a year at a private trade school. At the age of twenty, Gauls started the small photo shop "Herbert Gauls Photo retailers, specialist laboratory and Ansichtskartenverlag" at the Münzplatz in Koblenz. For decades he worked as an architectural and documentary photographer and also as a photojournalist for News media and Television.

In 1966 he joined the Photographer master's certificate in Hamburg with the best rating and erected immediately afterwards a building with a photo studio and specialized laboratories in the Carl Mand Road in Koblenz industrial area. In 1971 the studio enlarged into a 5-storey office building. Seven years later he built the new and current headquarters, a 1,000 m² photography studio in the August Horch Strasse in Koblenz. In the same year he received his first award the Wappenteller of Koblenz.

As a photographer Gauls documented the Handwerkskammer Koblenz in the late 1960s and early 1970s with numerous exhibitions, including the art of the Neuwied blacksmith and metal sculptor Klaus Rudolf Werhand.

According to his 80th birthday Herbert Gauls bequeathed in the year 2010 his extensive photographic archive on the recent history of the city with around two million negatives to the city of Koblenz. In 2012 Herbert Gauls was given the Verdienstmedaille des Landes Rheinland-Pfalz by the Minister-President of Rhineland-Palatinate Kurt Beck for his volunteer work for the common good.

Herbert Gauls lived in Weitersburg.

== Awards ==
- 1978: Verleihung des Wappentellers of the city of Koblenz
- 1989–2002: Master of the Upper Middle Rhine Photographers Guild
- 1997: Awarded the Golden Badge of Honour of the German Central Association of Professional Photographers
- 2000: Ehrennadel of Rhineland-Palatinate
- 2002: Honorary Master of the Upper Middle Rhine Photographers Guild
- 2012: Awarded the Verdienstmedaille des Landes Rheinland-Pfalz by the Minister-President of Rhineland-Palatinate Kurt Beck

== Exhibitions (selection) ==
- 1969: "Photo Exhibition Herbert Gauls" Handwerkskammer Koblenz Galerie Handwerk Koblenz
- 1992: "A photographer sees his city" in Löhr-Center on the occasion of the 2,000th anniversary of Koblenz
- 2005: 24 March – 16 May: Special Exhibition: "Herbert Gaul – on the road to taking pictures" in the Mittelrhein-Museum

== Books ==
- Paul Theodor Schmitz: Koblenzer Skizzen – Photography by Herbert Gauls, Görres-Druckerei, Koblenz, 1964
- Januarius Zick: Gemälde und Zeichnungen – Photography by Herbert Gauls, Koblenz : Mittelrhein-Museum, 1972
- Fotoband "Koblenz. Bewegte Zeiten – Die 50er Jahre" with texts by Gudrun Tribukait, Wartberg-Verlag, Gudensberg-Gleichen, 1995, ISBN 3-86134-253-7
- Fotoband "Koblenz. Bewegte Zeiten – Die 60er Jahre" with texts by Christine Vary, Wartberg-Verlag, Gudensberg-Gleichen, 1999, ISBN 3-86134-645-1
- Das Jubiläum 50 Jahre with texts by Reinhard Kallenbach, 2000
