= Maria Elisabeth Geyser =

German judge

Maria Elisabeth Geyser (born 6 November 1912 in Münster, Westphalia; died 26 June 2008) was a German judge. After 1945, she was first deputy at the Provident Office Munich, 1955 was a secondment to the Federal Social Court as a researcher. After Dr. Maria Schwarz, she was the second woman, who held the positions of a judge or chair judge at the Federal Social Court.
