= Carl Wyland =

German blacksmith

- Born: 22 May 1886; Cologne, Germany
- Died: 24 May 1972 (aged 86); Cologne, West Germany
- Occupation: Blacksmith

Carl Hubert Wyland (22 May 1886 – 24 May 1972) was a German blacksmith.

== Early life and career ==
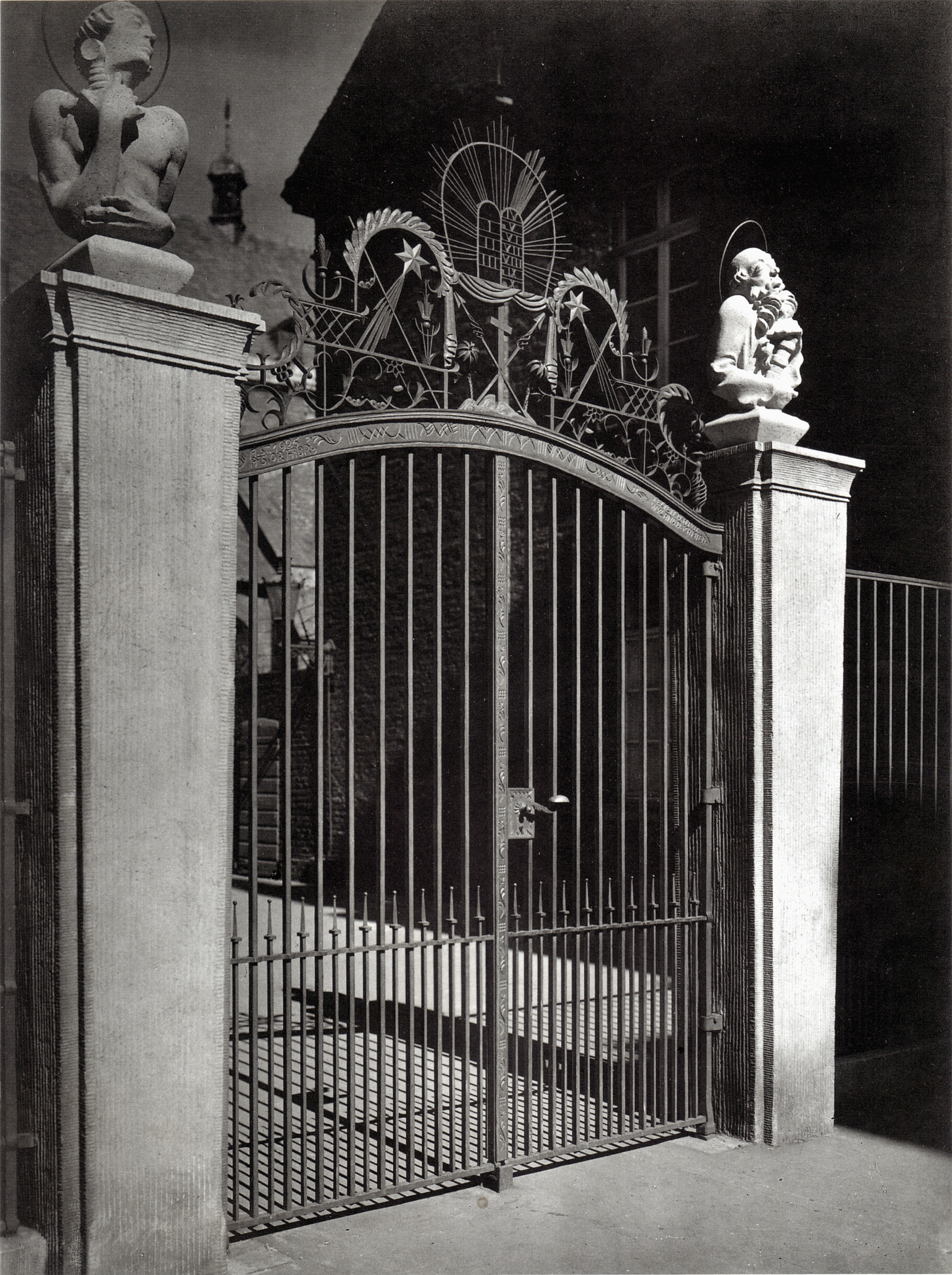
Gittertor an St. Georg in Cologne, Foto 1925 von Hugo Schmölz

Hailing from a traditional Cologne locksmith family Wyland led since the 1920s by large orders in Germany and Europe. From the 1950s he was also operating in the US.

In 1835 Carl Wyland's grandfather, Johann Wyland (1811–1884), founded a metalworking art shop.

At the age of 17, Carl Hubert Wyland decided to continue the family tradition and began a three-year apprenticeship in his father's business. His brother Heinrich instead decided to enter the field of electrical engineering. After his apprenticeship he attended the School of Applied Arts (1906–1909) and the Graduate School in Cologne. There Wyland was trained in forging technology, structural engineering, building construction and technical design. 1911/1912 he completed his training in the technical office of the Maschinenfabrik Wanzelius & Schlüsselburg in Metz. The entrance to the father's workshop was in 1913 after he had completed an internship in France.

In 1922 Wyland took over the workshop from his father Carl Gustav Wyland (1848–1922) and set it from metalworking art to locksmith art and pure art. He then focused on architectural blacksmithing. His wife Mary, born Frings – whom he married in 1921 – was a sister of the Cologne architect Ernst Wilhelm Scheidt (1889-1961). Their only son died in Russia in the World War II on 9 November 1943.

Carl Wyland worked together with many well-known architects such as Werner March or Rudolf Schwarz. Wyland received numerous national and international awards for his work. He also worked on drafts of his friend the Austrian sculptor Wolfgang Wallner (Kölner Werkschulen).

Wyland continued to work after his retirement. Many apprentices have been working with him studying his philosophy and skills. One of the last students, trained in Cologne in the Wyland ironwork shortly before his death in 1972 was the Neuwied blacksmith and metal sculptor Klaus Rudolf Werhand.

The estate of Carl Wyland is located in the Museum für Angewandte Kunst (Cologne) in Cologne.

== Awards ==
- 1966 Bundesverdienstkreuz 1. Klasse

== Works (selection) ==
- Gates of the University of Bonn

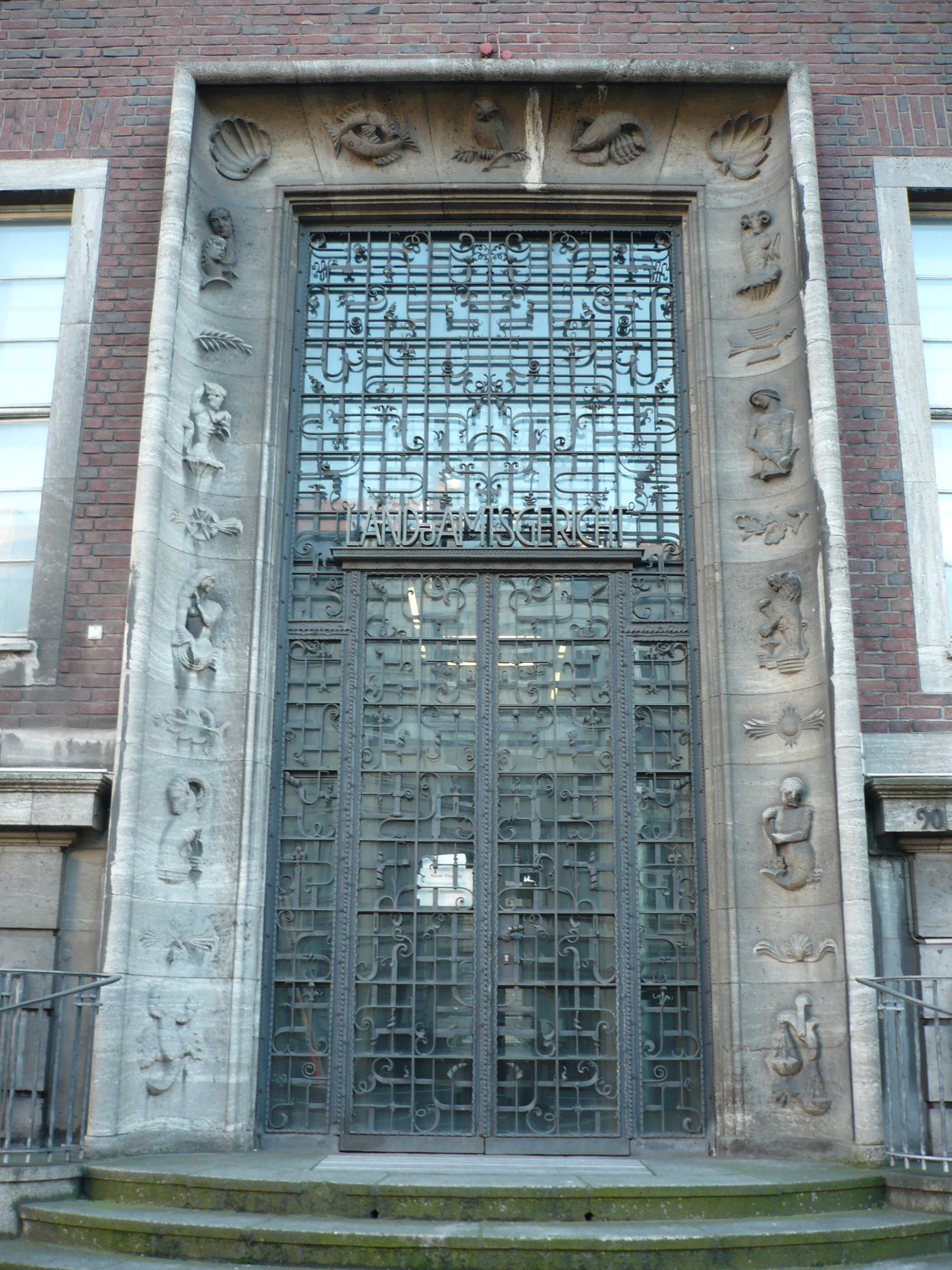
Schmiedearbeit am Hauptportal des ersten Gerichts-Erweiterungsbaus in Aachen

- 1928-1929: window grills and mounts for the business house of cigarette factory Haus Neuerburg in Cologne

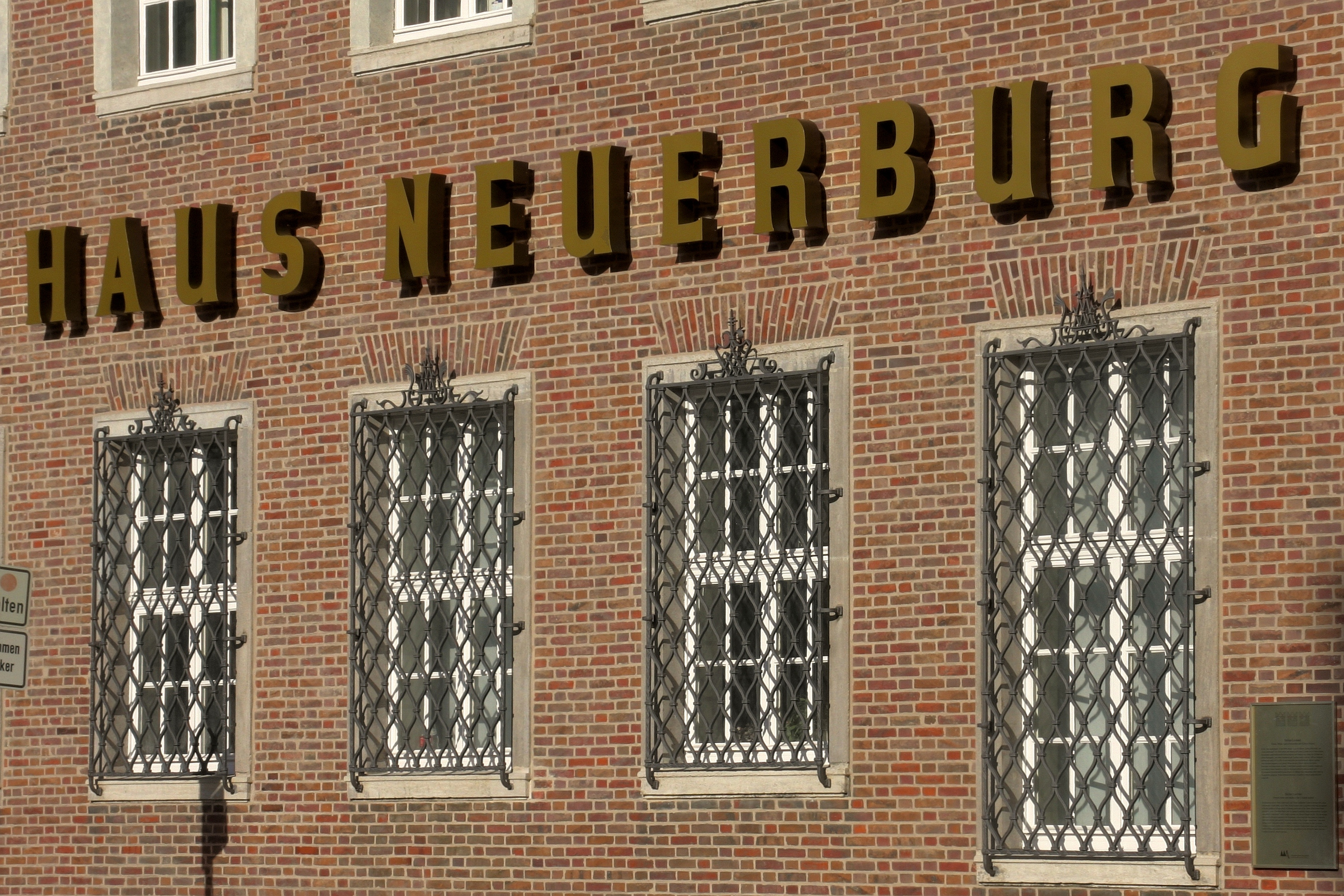
Fenstergitter am Haus Neuerburg, Köln

- Workings for the Villa Heinrich Neuerburg in Cologne-Marienburg in the style of Late Baroque
- Features of a number of U.S. churches
- Door unit with bars on the main building of the airport Köln-Butzweilerhof

== Exhibitions (selection) ==
- EisenZeit – Solo exhibition at the Museum für angewandte Kunst in Cologne from 24 October to 7 December 1997

== Literature ==
- Wolfram Hagspiel: Köln. Köln-Marienburg. Bauten und Architekten eines Villenvororts. (= Stadtspuren. Denkmäler in Köln. Band 8.) 2 Bände, J.P. Bachem Verlag, Köln 1996, ISBN 3-7616-1147-1, S. 966 f.
- Barbara Maas: Eisenzeit/Iron Age: Der Kölner Kunstschmied Carl Wyland. Wasmuth, Köln 1997, ISBN 3-8030-5068-5
