= David Roentgen =

German cabinetmaker (1743–1807)

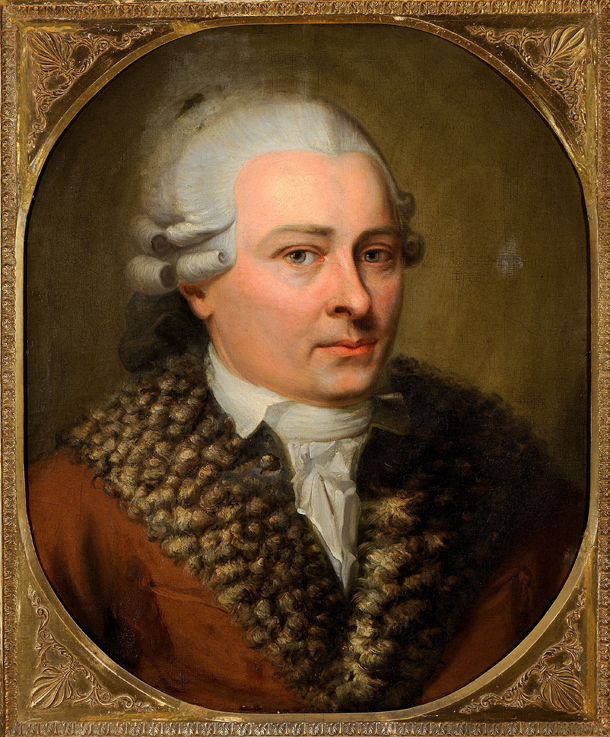
Portrait of Roentgen

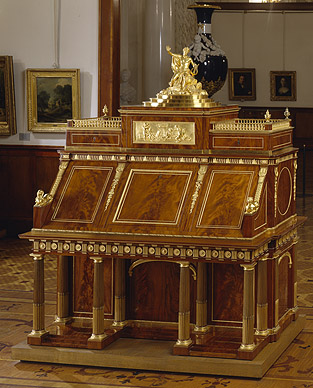
Mahogany bureau with a figure of Apollo, Hermitage Museum

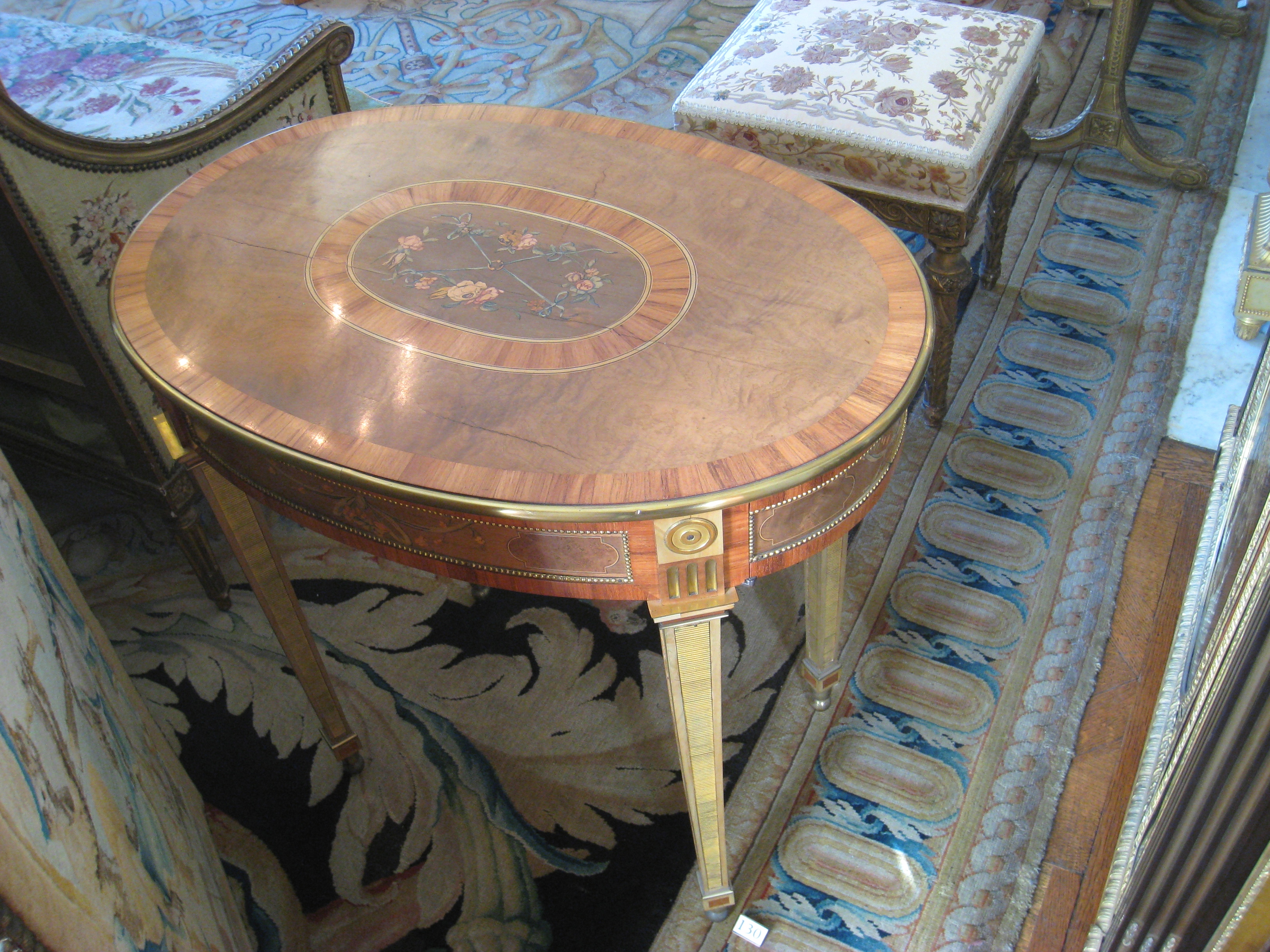
Table by David Roentgen, circa 1780–1790.

David Roentgen (1743 in Herrnhaag – February 12, 1807), was a German cabinetmaker of the eighteenth century, famed throughout Europe for his marquetry, secret drawers, and mechanical fittings. His work embraces the late Rococo and the Neoclassical styles.

== Chronology ==
In 1753 his father Abraham Roentgen, who had trained in London in the workshop of William Gomm, migrated to the Moravian settlement at Neuwied, near Coblenz, where he established a furniture factory. David learned his trade in his father's workshop, inherited the paternal business in 1772, and entered into partnership with the clockmaker Kintzing. By that time, the name of the firm was well known, even in France. Oddly he is remembered in France as one of the foreign cabinetmakers and workers in marquetry who, like Jean-François Oeben and Jean Henri Riesener, achieved distinction during the closing years of the Ancien Régime. Since Paris was the style center of Europe, he opened a show-room, but his furniture was made in Neuwied. The engraver Willerters recorded his appearance in Paris, initially on August 30, 1774, that M. Rontgen, celebre ébéniste, établi à Nieuwied, peintre de Coblenz, m'est venu voir, en m'apportant une lettre de recommandation de M. Zick, peintre à Coblenz ... Comme M. Rontgen connaissait personne à Paris, je lui fus utile en lui enseignant quelques sculpteurs et dessinateurs dont il avait besoin.

Roentgen was first and foremost an astute man of business. His outlet did not prosper as expected. The powerful trade corporation of the maîtres ébénistes disputed his right to sell in Paris furniture of foreign manufacture. In 1780 he resolved this restriction by inventing new style of marquetry, which attracted a good deal of attention. Instead of representing light and shade by burning, smoking or engraving the pieces of veneer, DR arranged intricate patterns of wood inlay to create the impression of pietra dura. His great rivals admitted him to their exclusive guild.

He appears to have curried considerable favor with the queen, Marie Antoinette, whose first language was also German. On several of his journeys throughout Europe, she charged him to deliver her presents and dolls dressed in the latest Paris fashions. They were intended to serve as patterns for the dressmakers to her mother and her sisters.

Because of his proficiency in constructing furniture with amusing mechanical features, the Queen appointed Roentgen ébéniste-mechanicien. Popular in the late eighteenth century, ladies' dressing tables were designed to appear as a desk, drawing table or other less personal furniture, to conceal toiletries. A spring trigger, hidden catch or button revealed its dual purpose.

David mastered this style, dubbed Harlequin after the theatrical character, whatever the reference to archetype implied. His mechanical inventiveness outshone more accomplished cabinetry. The extent of his fame is shown by Goethe mention of him in Wilhelm Meister's Apprenticeship. The box inhabited by the fairy during her travels with her mortal lover is compared to Roentgen's desk in which a single pull released many springs, latches, hidden drawers, secret compartments and mechanical devices. Louis XVI paid him 80,000 livres for such a desk. Outwardly it looked like a commode. Marquetry panels showed Minerva, Roman goddess of arts, hanging the portrait of Marie Antoinette on a column engraved with her name. Above the riot of architectural details was a musical clock (the work of the partner Peter Kinzing), topped by a cupola representing Parnassus, party peak. The interior of this monumental effort, 11 ft (3.4 m) high, was a marvel of mechanical precision. It disappeared during the First Empire under Napoleon.

Roentgen did not confine his attentions to Paris, or even to France, traveling about Europe accompanied by furniture vans of his factory's products. Undoubtedly his aptitude as a commercial traveler was remarkable. He had shops in Berlin and Saint Petersburg. On one of his visits to Russia, he sold to the Empress Catherine furniture invoiced at 20,000 roubles. She added 5000 roubles and a personal present, a gold snuff-box, for quick fulfillment of an unexpected request. When news arrived of the Imperial Russian Navy's victory over the Turks at Chesma, DR ingeniously mounted a clock commemorating the date and time onto the Tsarina's personal secretaire desk. This suite of furniture is believed to be in the Hermitage Museum, with vaults of so much remarkable art uncatalogued outside Russia. To the protection of the queen of France and the empress of Russia, David added the king of Prussia, Frederick William II, who in 1792 made him a Commerzienrat, commercial agent for the Lower Rhine district. The French Revolution and the Napoleonic Wars eclipsed Roentgen's star as many other great cabinetmakers of the period. In 1793 the Revolutionary government, declaring him an émigré, seized the contents of his showrooms, inventory and personal belongings. After that, he did no further business in Paris. Five years later, the French invasion of Germany, Prussia and Austria led to the closing of his factory in Neuwied. He died half ruined at Wiesbaden on 12 February 1807.

The most complete collection of his work in private hands remains that of the ducal house of Saxe-Coburg and Gotha, exhibited at Callenberg Castle in Coburg, north Bavaria. In 2012 Wolfam Koepp of the Metropolitan Museum of Art discovered a particular type of Roentgen table with removable legs for easier transport.

== Assessment ==
According to his biography in the Encyclopædia Britannica Eleventh Edition of 1911, Roentgen was not a great cabinetmaker: "His forms were often clumsy, ungraceful, and commonplace; his furniture lacked the artistry of the French and the English cabinetmakers of the great period which came to an end about 1790. His bronzes were poor in design and coarse in execution; his work, in short, is tainted by commercialism. As an inlayer, however, he holds a position of high distinction. His marquetry is bolder and more vigorous than that of Riesener, who in other respects soared far above him. As an adroit devisor of mechanism he fully earned a reputation which former generations rated more highly than the modern critic, with his facilities for comparison, is prepared to accept. On the mechanical side he produced, with the help of Kintzing, many long-cased and other clocks with ingenious indicating and registering apparatus. Roentgen delighted in architectural forms, and his marquetry more often than not represents those scenes from classical mythology which were the dear delight of the 18th century." He is well represented at the V&A Museum in London, and other collections.

== See also ==
- Louis XVI furniture
- Louis XVI style
