= Synagogue District, Neuwied =

The synagogue district of Neuwied (German: Synagogenbezirk Neuwied) with its seat in Neuwied, Germany, was created by the 1847 Prussian Jews Act. Neuwied is a town in the eponymous county of Neuwied in the north of the state of Rhineland-Palatinate.

In 1864, the municipalities of Heddesdorf and Irlich belonged to the district. In 1894 they were joined by Jews living in Fahr, Hüllenberg, Rockenfeld and Rodenbach.
