= Klaus Rudolf Werhand =

German sculptor

- Born: 4 December 1938; Neuwied, Rhineland-Palatinate, Nazi Germany
- Died: 20 March 2009 (aged 70); Neuwied, Rhineland-Palatinate, Germany
- Occupation: Blacksmith

Klaus Rudolf Werhand (4 December 1938 – 20 March 2009) was a metalsmith and a coppersmith from Neuwied, Rhineland-Palatinate, Germany.

== Early life ==
Werhand was born into a well-established family of craftsmen in Niederbieber and the son of Master Peter Werhand, a plumber and electrician, and Helene Werhand (née Neumann), a master tailor. In 1960, he married Renate Kuhn (born on 3 October 1939 in Neuwied), the daughter of Hermann Kuhn, a locksmith and racer. Werhand and Kuhn had two children: a daughter, Susanne, and a son, Martin Werhand. Martin Werhand is the founder of the publishing house Martin Werhand Verlag, which specializes in fiction.

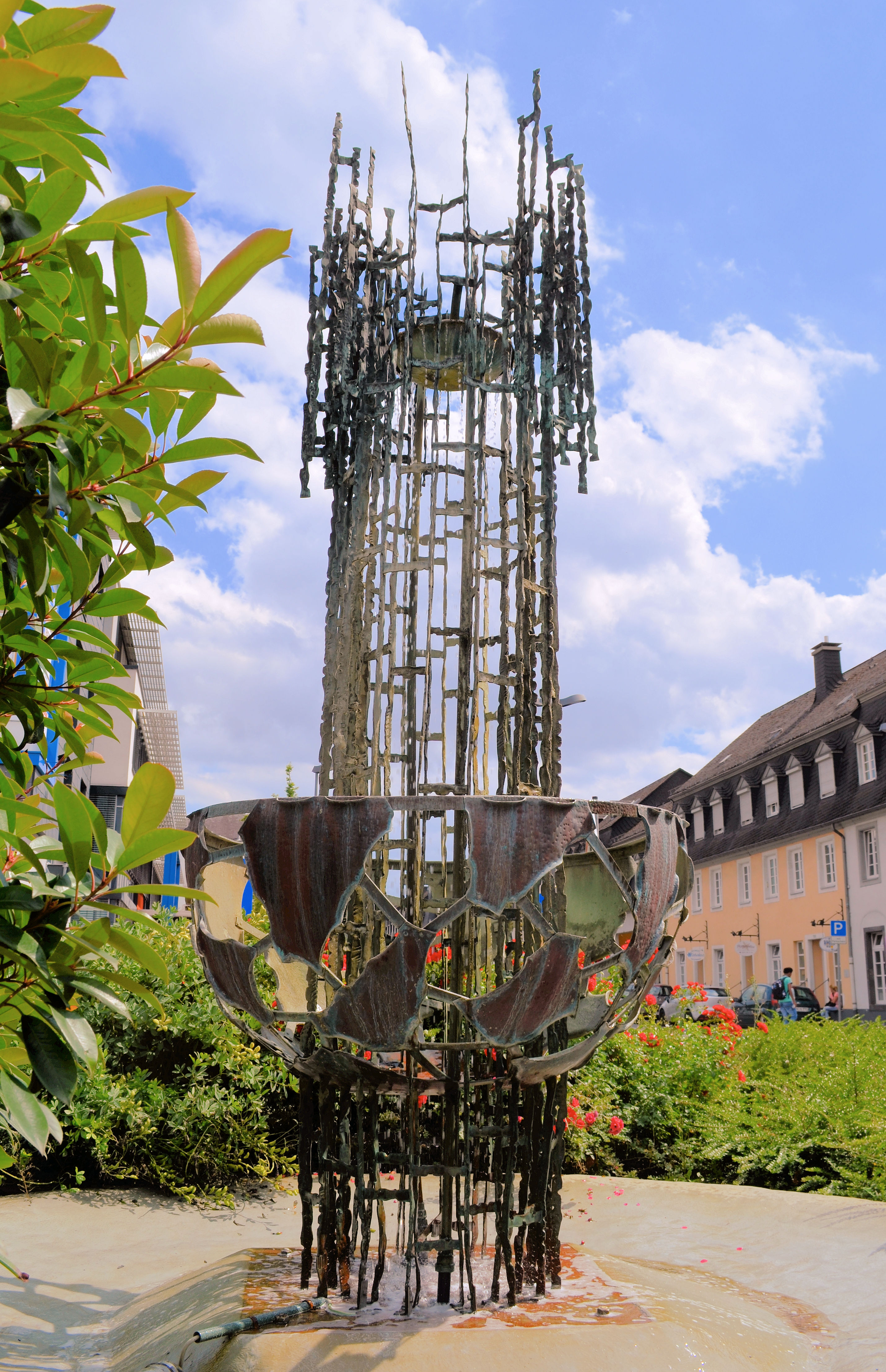
Werhand-created fountain located in city center of Neuwied, Rhineland-Palintate; created 1971, erected 1979)

== Career ==
After leaving school, Klaus Rudolf Werhand trained to become a plumber in the family business. In 1959, he joined the Bundeswehr, the unified armed forces of Germany, where he trained as a mechanic aircraft-cell constructor. In 1965, he received his diploma of master craftsman as a plumber and electrician and began working with his older brother Dietrich Werhand (1937-2021), the head of the family business founded by their father in 1939. His older brother Dietrich grew the Werhand Company into a medium-sized enterprise as a Kommanditgesellschaft.

At the age of 14, Werhand began his first works in copper manufacturing. In 1970 he finally started his own business as a metal sculptor. He learned his craft from, among others, an artist in Kaufbeuren. Werhand was the last student of the German blacksmith Carl Wyland in Cologne, where he studied the intricacies of the art of blacksmithing.

During the 1960s and 1970s, Werhand had numerous exhibitions of copper repoussé, including in the cities of Berlin, Frankfurt and Munich as well as at the Koblenz Chamber of Skilled Crafts (Handwerkskammer Koblenz), which was documented by the German photographer Herbert Gauls.

In 1979, Werhand's fountain was opened in the city of Neuwied, on Luis Place (Luisenplatz). At the beginning of the 1980s, Friedrich Wilhelm, Prince of Wied turned to Werhand for the production of wrought iron lamps for the electoral Schloss Neuwied.

Werhand made numerous artifacts from copper, brass, bronze, aluminum, and steel. In addition to fulfilling contracts for the public sector, he created sculptures using the technique of repoussé, and other works of art including: fire guards, door panels, numerous metal images and engravings, (inspired by artworks by Albrecht Dürer and Rembrandt), coats of arms, lights, reliefs, and copper portraits, as well as hand-forged window grilles, railings, candle holders, lamps and various other pieces of art.

Werhand was a registered Member of the Professional Association of Visual Artists in Rhineland-Palatinate (Berufsverband Bildender Künstler Rheinland Pfalz) from 1970 until his death.

Klaus Rudolf Werhand retired in the late-1990s. He died on 20 March 2009 in his home town of Neuwied at the age of 70 after a long illness.

== Notable exhibitions ==
- 1971: 08.06. – 12.07. Klaus Rudolf Werhand – Metal Photo of Herbert Gauls
- 1971: 19.07. – 30.08. Klaus Rudolf Werhand – Exhibition of copper Repoussé in Koblenz

== Notable works ==
Werhand created a complex sculptural and artistic work with a variety of Art Metal works for the Public Sector. His work has been shown at numerous exhibitions and erected in public.

- Klaus-Rudolf-Werhand Fountain in the city of Neuwied 1979 (Langendorfer Straße 143, 56564 Neuwied)
- Warrior honor Males in copper
- Wrought-iron lamps at the electoral Schloss Neuwied in the early 1980s

== Review ==
"Dating from the Neutered born and multi-award winning metal sculptor Klaus Rudolf Werhand in Melsbach, the work of art whose execution is transferred was a fountain of running 180 meters and about seven hundred pounds of heavy, hand-forged copper tape. When the Copper Fountain was artfully crafted in 1971, it would take another eight years until he finally found his place on the Luisenplatz. Since the days when Neutered staged his great dike city festival, the Copper Fountain as a jewelry of downtown Neuwied now enriched and towering its almost delicate cascade forms at the parish road opposite the post round four meters and its illuminated water column in the dark as an eye-catcher."

== Gallery ==
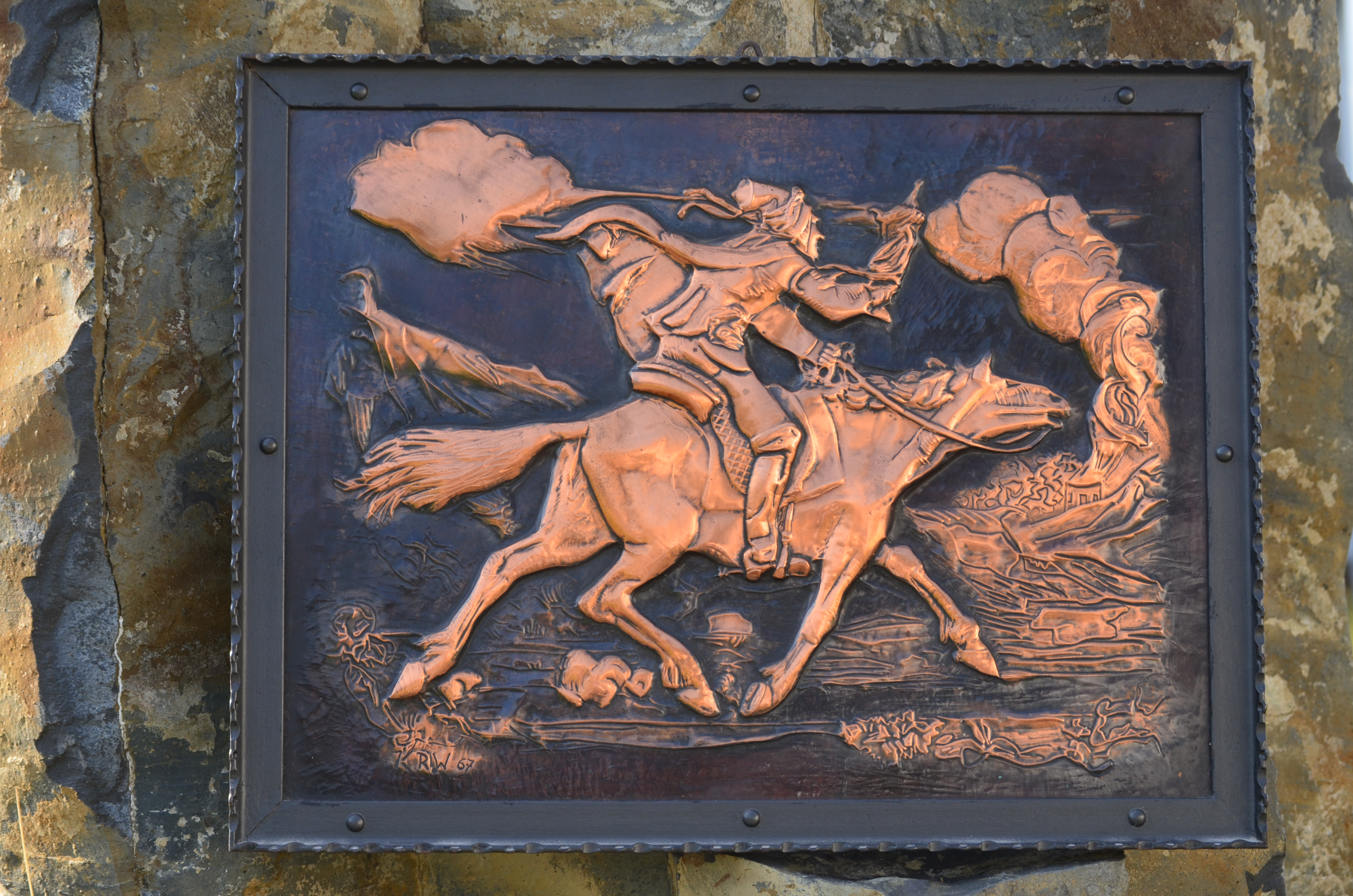
The Ghost Rider (Copper picture 1967)

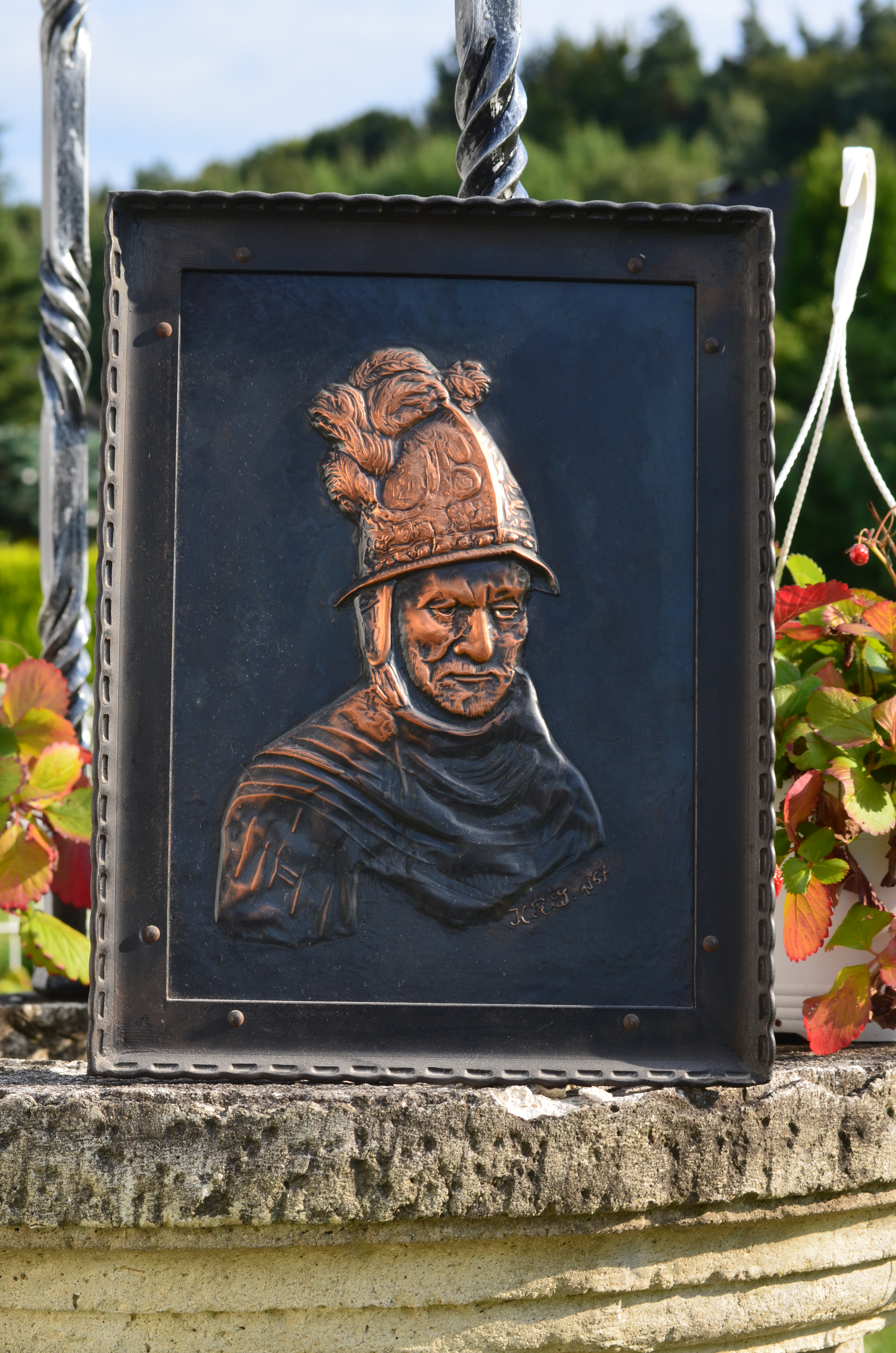
The Man with the Golden Helmet (Copper picture 1967 for motives of Rembrandt)

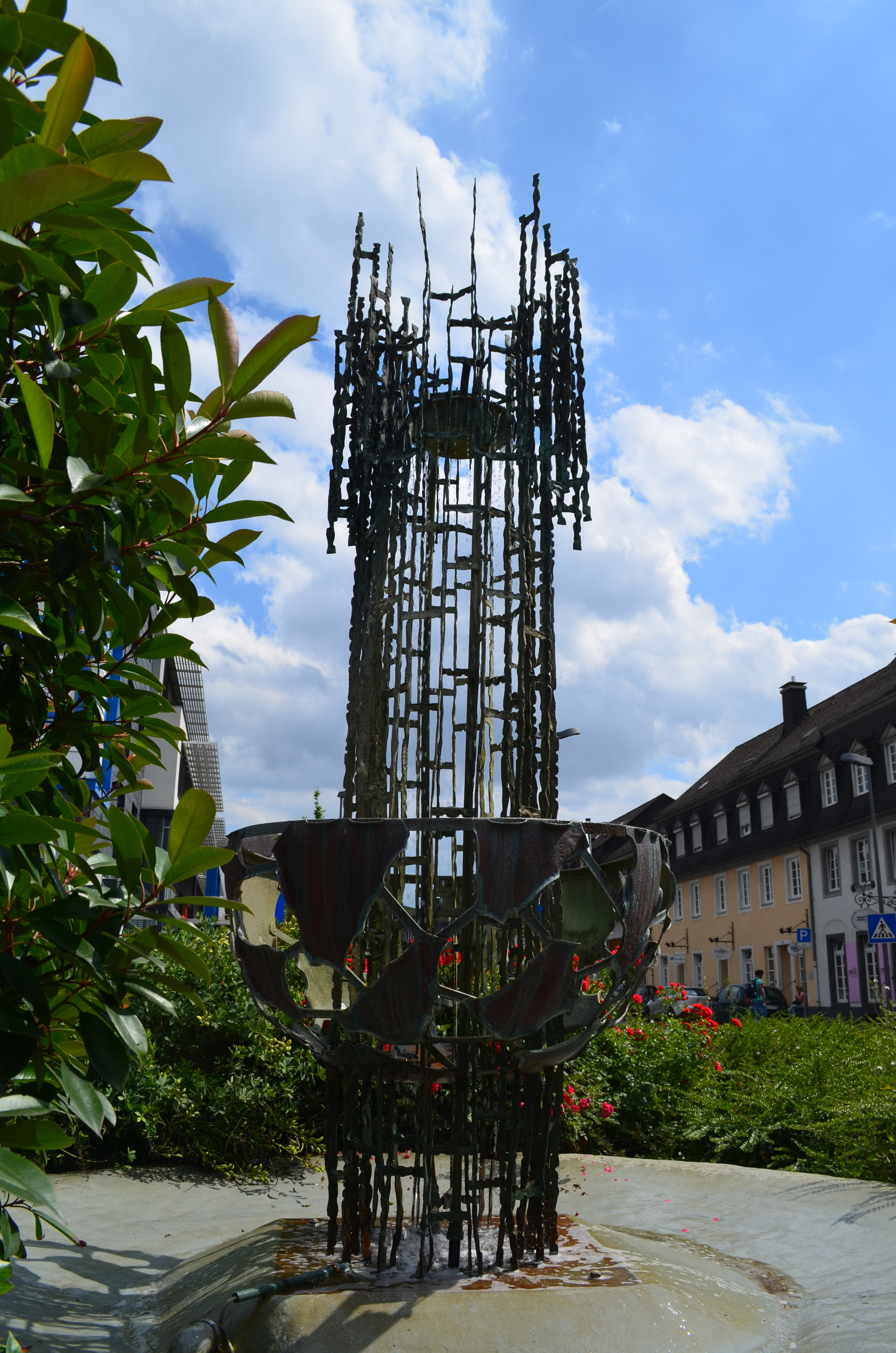
Klaus Rudolf Werhand-Fountain in the city of Neuwied (Production 1971 - erected in 1979)

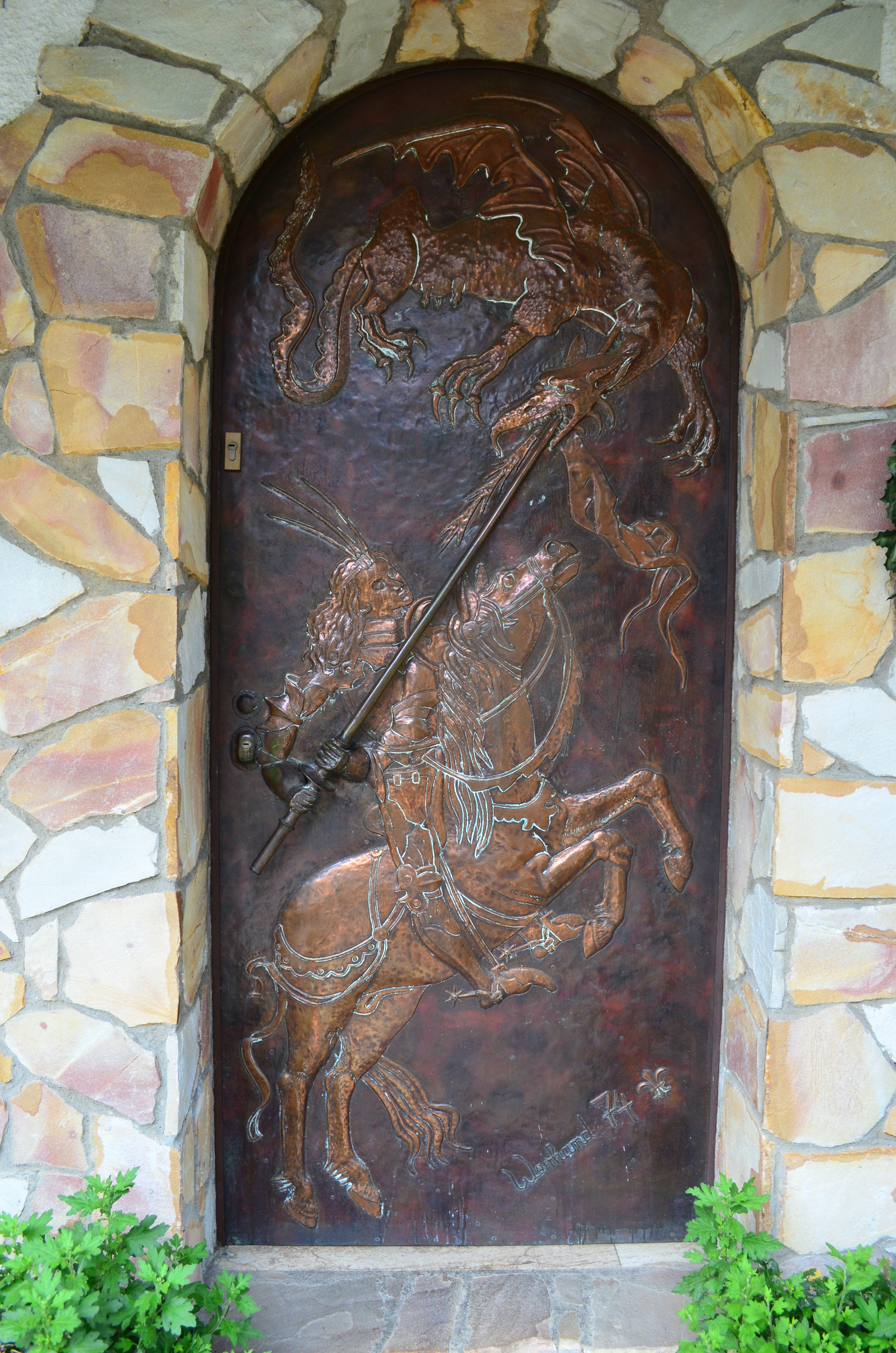
The Dragonslayer (Copper Door 1974)

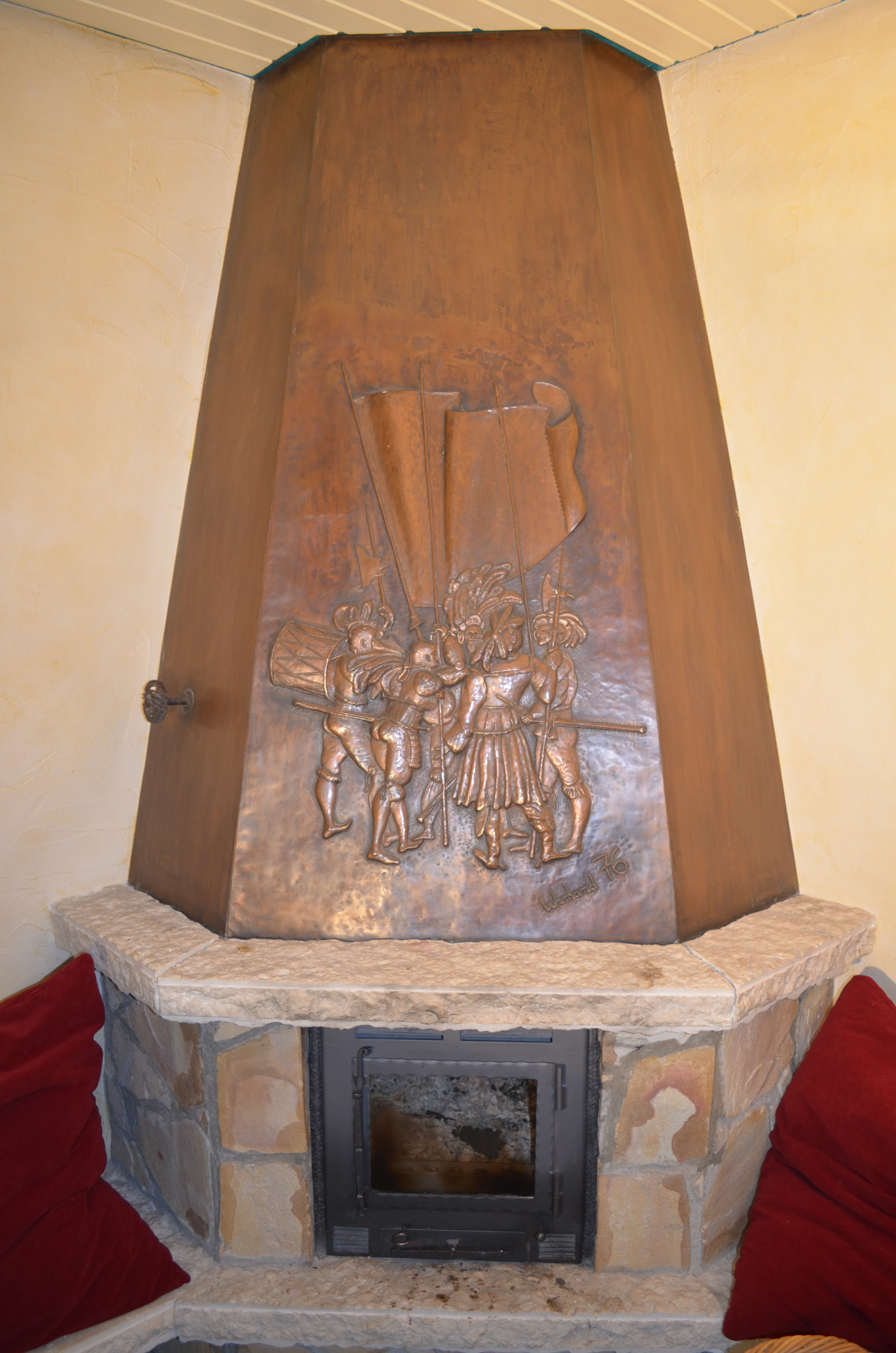
Chimney Apron (1976) Men-at-arms

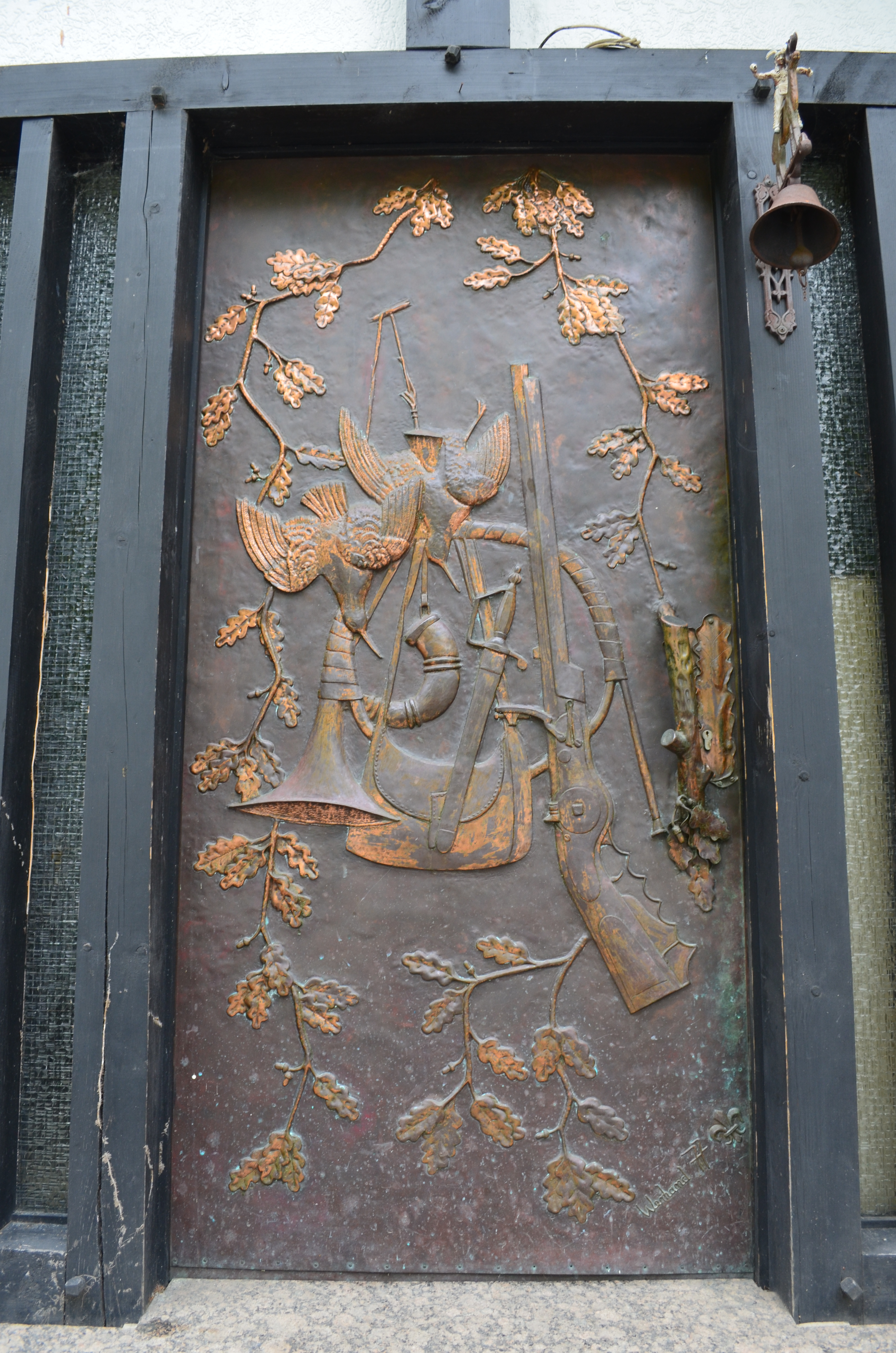
Hunting Utensils (Copper Door of the Laubachsmühle in Altwied 1977)

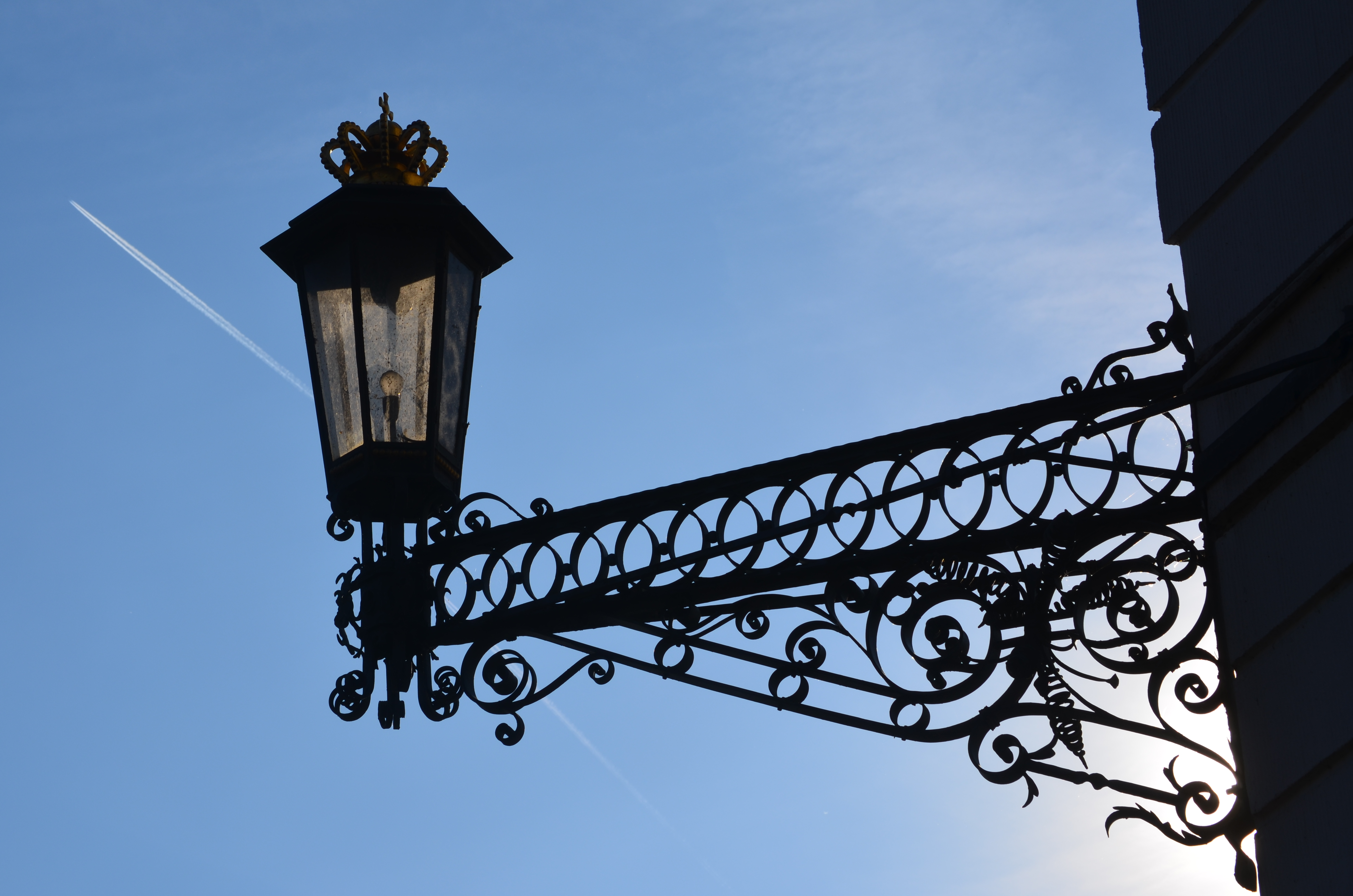
Lamps on Neuwied Castle (The early 1980s)

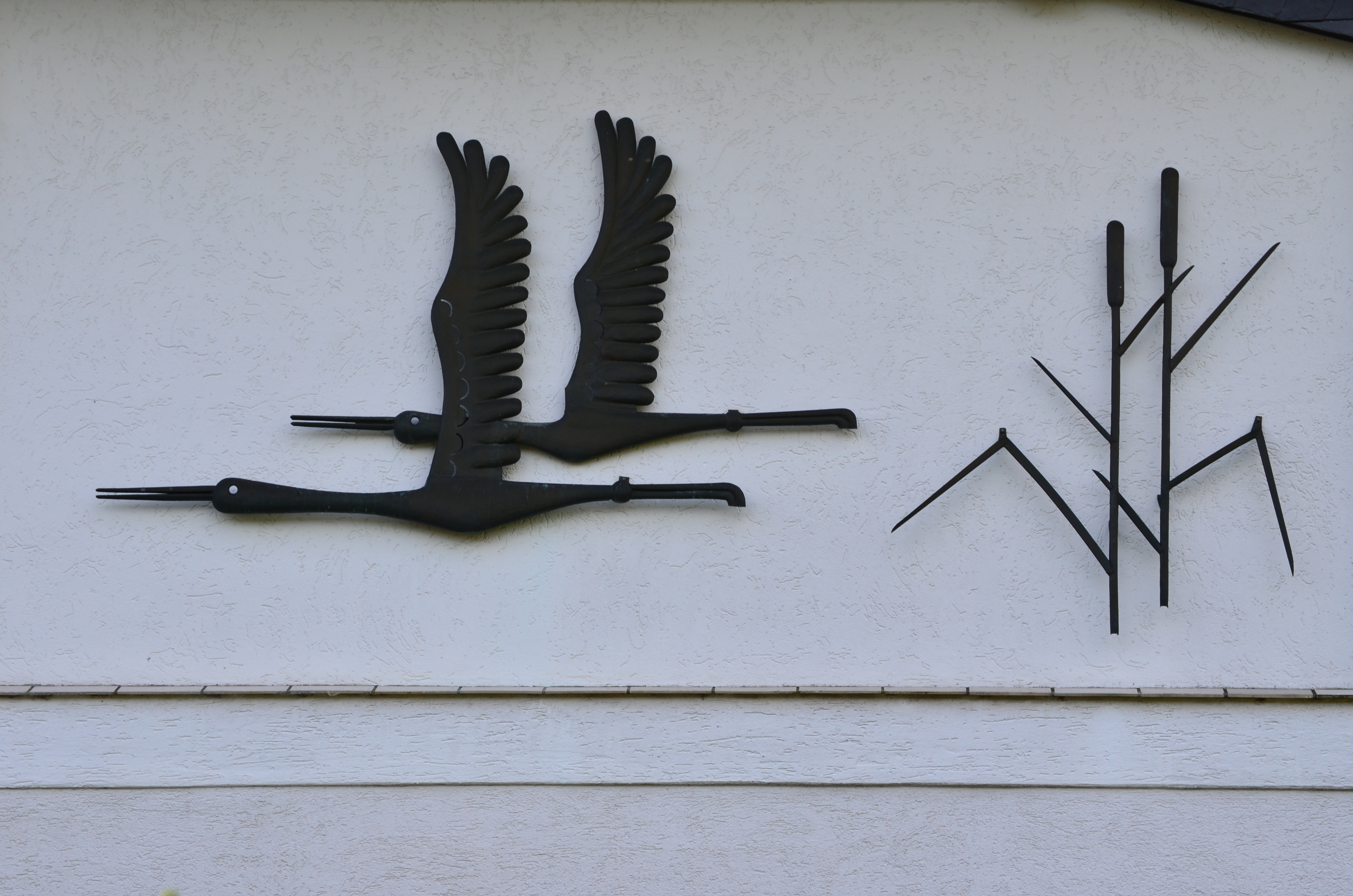
Flying Cranes (Motif in the early 1980s)

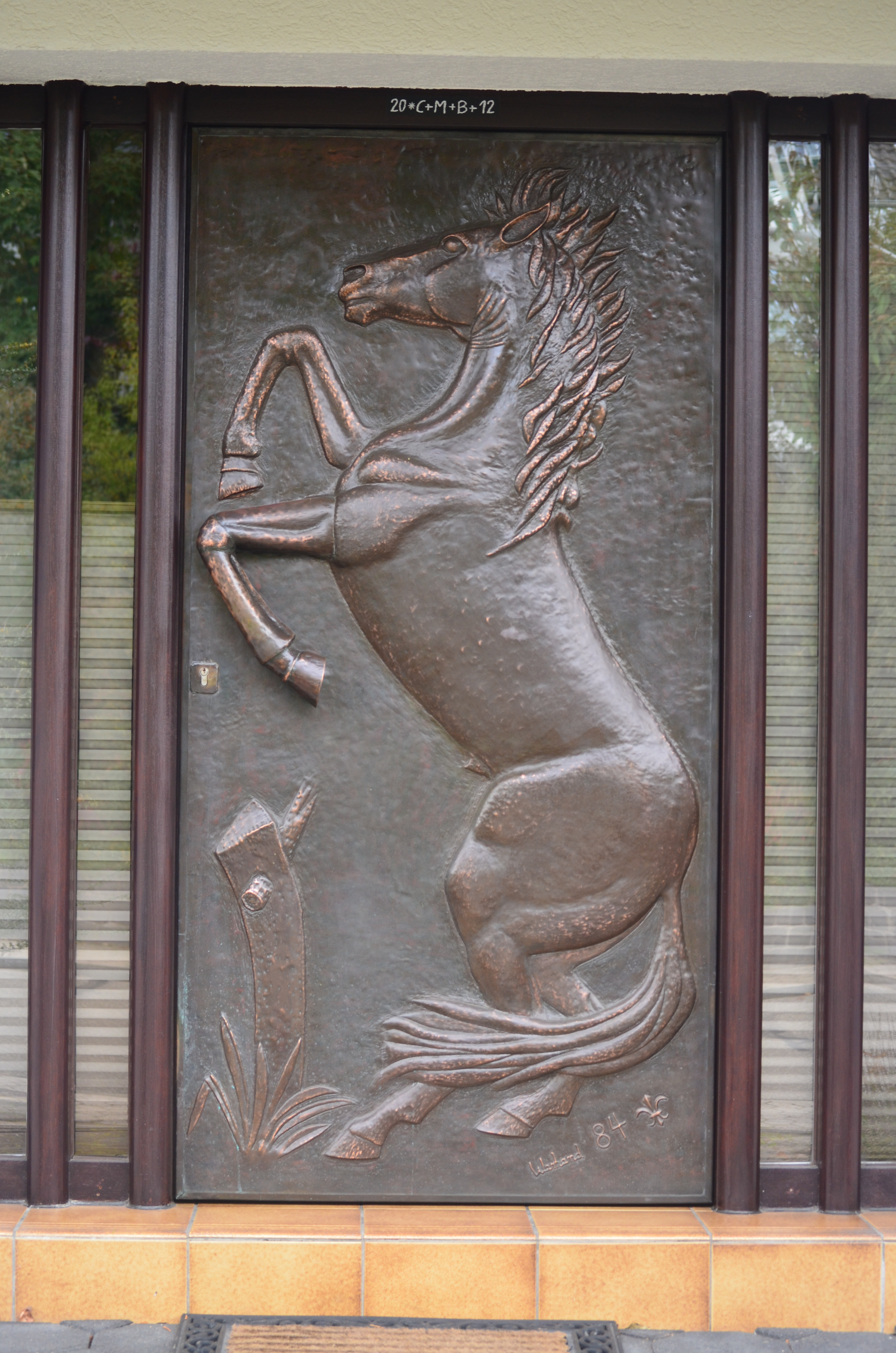
The Horse (Copper Door 1984)
