= Steven J. Schloeder =

American architect

Steven J. Schloeder is a theologian, architect, and author.

== Early life and career ==
Steven Joseph Schloeder received the bachelor of architecture cum laude from Arizona State University.

After acquiring professional registration in the State of Arizona, Schloeder received the Rotary International Graduate Scholarship and completed the Master in Architecture degree at the University of Bath, studying under Prof. Michael Brawne. His thesis, The Architecture of the Vatican Two Church, established a theory of sacramental architecture in criticism and rejection of the tenets of architectural modernism, proposing a metalanguage of sacred architecture which participates in the formal structure of the human body, the tent/ house/ temple, and the city. The thesis was published as Architecture in Communion by Ignatius Press, San Francisco, 1998.

Schloeder received the Presidential Fellowship at the Graduate Theological Union in Berkeley, CA, where he attained the Ph.D. in theology, working under Rev. Dr. Michael Morris, OP. His dissertation, The Church of the Year 2000: A dialogue on Catholic Architecture for the Third Millennium, critically examined the architectural competition for the Jubilee Church and the works of Richard Meier, Tadao Ando, Peter Eisenman, Günter Behnisch, Santiago Calatrava, and Frank Gehry.

Schloeder is a licensed architect (Arizona, Pennsylvania), practicing nationally in the United States in all aspects of Roman Catholic sacred architecture, through his firm Liturgical Environs, PC. He currently works for the Pennsylvania Department of General Services.

== Major projects ==
- Saint Therese Catholic Church, Collinsville OK (1996-2000)
- Saint Paul Catholic Church, Pensacola FL (2003-2008)
- Saints Ann and Joachim Catholic Church, Fargo, ND (2006-2010)
- Saint Clare of Assisi Catholic Church, Surprise, AZ (2007-2010)
- Our Savior Catholic Center, University of Southern California, Los Angeles, CA (liturgical architect), (2007-2012)
- Our Lady of Grace Catholic Church, Maricopa, AZ (2008 - )

== Bibliography ==
- The Architecture of the Mystical Body, in Between Concept and Identity, ed. Esteban Fernández-Cobián. Cambridge Scholar Publishing, 2014.
- Understanding a church: what we see, and what it means. London: Catholic Truth Society, 2014.
- Similis est Homini Patrifamilias: Thinking about the Church as ‘Sacramental Sign’, in Sacred Architecture, Issue 24 (2013): 29–31.
- A Whole Theatrical Presentation Book review of Real Presence: Sacrament Houses and the Body of Christ by Achim Timmerman, in Sacred Architecture, Issue 23 (2013): 47.
- Catholic Architecture. London: Catholic Truth Society, 2013.
- Review of The Religious Imagination in Modern and Contemporary Architecture: A Reader, edited by Renata Hejduk and Jim Williamson, New York: Routledge 2011 in Faith and Form (vol XLV, 1/2012): 33.
- "Rudolf Schwarz e la sua ricezione nelgi Stati Uniti" in Il Covile No. 636 (22 Marzo 2011): 7–16.
- “Per Lumina Vera ad Verum Lumen: The Anagogical Intention of Abbot Suger”, in ΣΙΜΜΕΙΚΤΑ: Collection of Works – 40th Anniversary of the Institute for Art History, ed.Ivan Stevović, University of Belgrade, Serbia 2011. Pending publication.
- "Rudolf Schwarz and His Reception in America" in Das Münster (1/2011): 47–52.
- "Oh Ancient Beauty Ever New: Thinking about Sacramental Architecture" in The Official Catholic Directory, Berkeley Heights NJ: P.J. Kenedy & Sons, 2010.
- “Heaven Wedded to Earth” in Ministry and Liturgy 34.4 (2007): 8–11, 31–34.
- L’architettura del Corpo Mistico: Progettare per il culto secondo il Concilio Vaticano II. Palermo: Casa L’Epos Editrice 2005. Italian edition of Architecture in Communion.
- “Sacred Architecture and the Christian Imagination” in The Catholic Imagination: Proceedings Of The 24th Annual Convention Of The Fellowship Of Catholic Scholars. Kenneth D. Whitehead, ed. South Bend, IN: Saint Augustine's Press 2003: 74–96.
- The Church of the Year 2000: A Dialogue on Catholic Church Architecture for the Third Millennium. Ph.D. Dissertation. Berkeley CA: Graduate Theological Union 2003 and Ann Arbor MI: University Microfilm International 2003.
- “Sacramental Architecture: Body, Temple, City” in Faith and Form 36.3 (2003): 7–10.
- “Recovery of the Symbolic” in Jacques Maritain and the Many Ways of Knowing. Douglas A. Ollivant, ed. Washington DC: The Catholic University of America Press 2002: 303–314.
- “If this be ordinary…” Book review of Geometry of Love by Margaret Visser in University Bookman 42.2 (Summer 2002).
- “From Mission to Mishmash: How Modernism Has Failed Sacred Architecture” in Nexus, A Journal of Opinion 6.1 (Spring 2001): 67–74.
- “Plany odnowy reformy: nowe spojrzenie na architekturę kościelną” (“Plans for the renewal of the reform: New view on the Architecture of the Church”) in Christianitas 6 [Poland] 2000.
- “Back to the Drawing Board: Rethinking Church Architecture” in Crisis (February 2000): 33–38.
- “Chiesa di S. Teresa” in Riconquistare lo spazio sacro. Cristiano Rosponi, ed. Roma: Editrice Il Bosco e la nave 1999: 129.
- “The Altar: Direction and Liturgical Dynamics” in The Bride of Christ 23.1: 4-8 (excerpted from Architecture in Communion).
- “Our Lady of the Angels: An Architectural Review” in Catholic World Report (December 1998).
- “A Return to Humane Architecture” in Intercollegiate Review 34.1 (Fall 1998).
- Architecture in Communion: Implementing the Second Vatican Council through Liturgy and Architecture. San Francisco: Ignatius Press 1998.
- The History and Imagery of Church Architecture. Birkenhead UK: Church in History Information Center, 1996.
- “Building Paradise for Homo Modernus” book review of Living Machines by E. Michael Jones, in Catholic World Report (October 1995).
- “What Happened to Church Architecture?” in Catholic World Report (March 1995).
- The Architecture of the Vatican Two Church. M. Arch Thesis. University of Bath, UK 1989.
