= Monika Kropshofer =

German painter and photographer (born 1952)

Monika Kropshofer (born 14 November 1952) is a German painter and photographer. Kropshofer is known for her large-format painted landscape and architecture photographs which were created as a result of many work journeys and stays in Europe, Africa und Asia.

== Life and work ==
Kropshofer was born in Neuwied. From 1972 to 1977, she studied Law at the Johannes Gutenberg-University in Mainz. After her two years as an articled clerk in Mainz, she worked as a lawyer from 1980, first in Mainz, then in Koblenz, and took her doctorate in 1982. In 1983, Kropshofer opened her own law office and was active as a court lawyer at the Coblence High Court of Justice. She terminated this activity in 1990 to study the History of art at the Rheinische Friedrich-Wilhelms-Universität Bonn. At the same time, she worked as a freelance artist, finishing her studies in 1995.

Kropshofer began her autodidactic artistic training by experimenting with various picture material and bases. From the beginning, she turned her main attention to the combination of various media, especially photography and painting. Kropshofer projects landscape and architecture photographs onto the most varied kinds of bases (glass, sheets of plastic, photographic paper, window blinds, plastic foils) and subsequently works on them with paint. Here, Kropshofer does without any additional digital picture processing. The photographs are taken during the artist's regular working trips and stays in Europe, Africa and South-East Asia. Since the mid-2000s, the works have become larger in format and more far-reaching and from now on, extensive installations and objects were also created.

Kropshofer's artistic discussion always turns around the formal dialogue between the object depicted and the media used. Her method for doing this is the construction and deconstruction of spatiality, depending on each picture basis and the revelation of the appropriateness of the structures in landscape and architecture with the help of painting. Thus her works are in the tradition of photography's very own discourse, the question of reproduction and reality, fiction and real life.

The artist lives and works in Boppard.

== Works in public collections ==
- Ludwig Museum Koblenz: Untitled (Island), 2010, 70 x 100 cm, mixed technique on digital print on plastic plate
- City of Grimmen: Untitled (Grimmen), 2007, 2 works, each 30 x 45 cm, mixed technique on photo paper
- Goethe-Institut Taiwan: Untitled (Vietnam), 2007, 50 x 75 cm, mixed technique on photo paper
- Museum am Strom, Bingen am Rhein: Untitled, Wernerkapelle I, 2011, 105 × 70 cm, mixed technique on digital print on plastic plate
- City of Boppard: Boppard, Electoral Castle, 2015, 100 x 150 cm, mixed technique on digital print on plastic plate
- Regional Authority Rheinland, Langenfeld: Untitled (Memorial stone, cemetery Hadamar), 2016, 80 × 120 cm, mixed technique on digital print on plastic plate
- Villa Vigoni, Menaggio: Untitled (Weimar, Roman house), 2017, 80 × 120 cm, mixed technique on digital print on plastic plate
- Stadt Lahr: metamorphoses, 4 works, 2018, each 165 × 110 cm, mixed technique on digital print on multilayer plastic plates

== Exhibitions (selection) ==
- May–June 2007: Rot(T)räume, Showroom Condehouse, Cologne, Germany
- July–September 2007: Strukturen: Wasser und Backstein („Structures: Water and Brick“), Museum and Water Tower, Grimmen, Germany
- May–June 2008: Transformationen (Transformations), Municipal Gallery Baumhaus, Wismar, Germany
- October–November 2008: Wasser und Stein („Water and Stone“), German Arts Centre, Taipei, Taiwan
- June–July 2009: Structure and Ornament, Hotel Intercontinental Hong Kong (promoted by the German Consulate-General), Hongkong
- February 2010: Hybrid, Espace Paragon, Luxembourg
- April–May 2010: ArchiTextur, Middle Rhine Museum, Coblence, Germany
- March–May 2011: Interventionen, State Representation of the Rhineland-Palatinate, Berlin, Germany
- January–February 2012: La dialectique de la réflexion, House of the Rhineland-Palatinate, Dijon, France
- July–October 2012: Changing Dream-Streams (I), Museum am Strom, Bingen am Rhein, Germany, together with Elisabeth Bergner
- October–November 2012: Journey of Discovery, Gallery Baum, Seoul, South Korea
- February–March 2013: Raumwelten („Space Worlds“), Landtag of Rhineland-Palatinate, Mainz, Germany together with Susan Geel
- April–June 2013: Changing Dream-Streams (II), Museumkrems, Krems, Germany, together with Elisabeth Bergner
- November 2013: Duett, Gallery Alfred Treiber, Vienna, Austria, together with Elisabeth Bergner
- May–July 2014: New Works, Gallery photo-city, Rangoon, Myanmar
- February 2015: The world itself, Kunsthalle Herrenhof, Neustadt-Mußbach, Germany
- October–December 2015: Back to basics, Museum Boppard, Boppard, Germany
- October 2015–January 2016: Der Rhein - eine romantische Affäre, StadtGalerie Neuwied, Neuwied, Germany
- April–May 2016: Private View, Gallery Art nou mil-lenni, Barcelona, Spain
- April–May 2016: Translucide, Gallery Retrouvailles, Stadtbredimus, Luxembourg
- August 2016: KUNSTPOSTSTELLE, Exhibition at the GEDOK-Gallery, Berlin, Germany
- March–May 2017: STADT, LAND, FLUSS, Deutsche Gesellschaft für Internationale Zusammenarbeit, Bonn, Germany
- May–November 2017: Borderline, Villa Vigoni, Menaggio, Italy
- September–October 2017: Places and Spaces, Wissenschaftszentrum Bonn, Bonn, Germany
- December 2017–January 2018: Hommage to Elsa Brändström, Frauenmuseum, Bonn, Germany
- March 2018: Der Engel von Sibirien. Elsa Brändström, Tapetenwerk, Leipzig, Germany
- March–April 2018: Elsa Brändström, Abbey, Grimmen, Germany
- April–October 2018: Metamorphosen, art project at Landesgartenschau Baden -Württemberg, Lahr, Germany
- September–November 2018: Entdeckungsreise, Galery VIA, Baden-Baden
- October–November 2018: Zwischen Himmel und Erde, Haus an der Redoute, Bonn - Bad Godesberg
- October–November 2018: Ein Jahrhundert Frauenwahlrecht, Kunstforum GEDOK, Hamburg
- January–February 2019: Wahrheit und Fiktion, Galery of the Kunstverein L´Art pour Lahr, Lahr
- June–July 2019: Heimat 2.0, Ministry of Homeland, Municipal Affairs, Construction and Equality of the State of North Rhine-Westphalia, Düsseldorf
- September 2019 –January 2020: Bauhaus – form und reform, Landesmuseum Mainz, Mainz
- January–March 2020: Art Salon, Museum Gustavo de Maetzu, Estella-Lizarra, Spain
- July–October 2020: Paradiese, Stadtgalerie Neuwied, Neuwied, Germany
- September–October 2020: Leidenschaft Kunst, GEDOK-Galerie, Hamburg, Germany
- October–November 2020: Feuer und Flamme, Kunstforum Eifel, Gemünd, Germany
- June–July 2021: Dialogue among the Antithesis, Museum Crocetti, Rome, Italy
- June–July 2021: Verborgenes, Haus an der Redoute, Bonn, Germany
- September 2021: Contesti, Galerie Arte Borgo, Rome, Italy
- September–October 2021: Schattenseite, Urban Gallery Schwingeler Hof, Wesseling, Germany

== Literature ==
- Beyer, Savoy, Tegethoff: Allgemeines Künstlerlexikon, Volume 82, Berlin 2014.
- Changing Dream Streams, catalogue of the exhibition of the same title by the two artists Monika Kropshofer and Elisabeth Bergner, Boppard, 2012, ISBN 978-3-00-038410-3.
- Interventionen: catalogue of the exhibition of the same title at the State Representation of the Rhineland-Palatinate, Berlin, 2011, ISBN 978-3-00-033741-3.
- Back to basics: catalogue of the exhibition of the same title at the Museum Boppard, Boppard, 2015, ISBN 978-3-00-050867-7.
- Architekturfotografie als Ausstellungsarchitektur, in: GDKE Rheinland-Pfalz, Landesmuseum Mainz (Ed.): bauhaus - form und reform, E.A. Seemann-Verlag, Mainz und Leipzig 2019, ISBN 978-3-86502-426-8.
- Dialogo tra le antitesi, catalogue of the exhibition of Museum Crocetti, Rome, Italy, 2021.
