= Peter Kinzing =

German Mennonite clockmaker

Peter Kinzing (1745–1816) was a noted German Mennonite clockmaker.

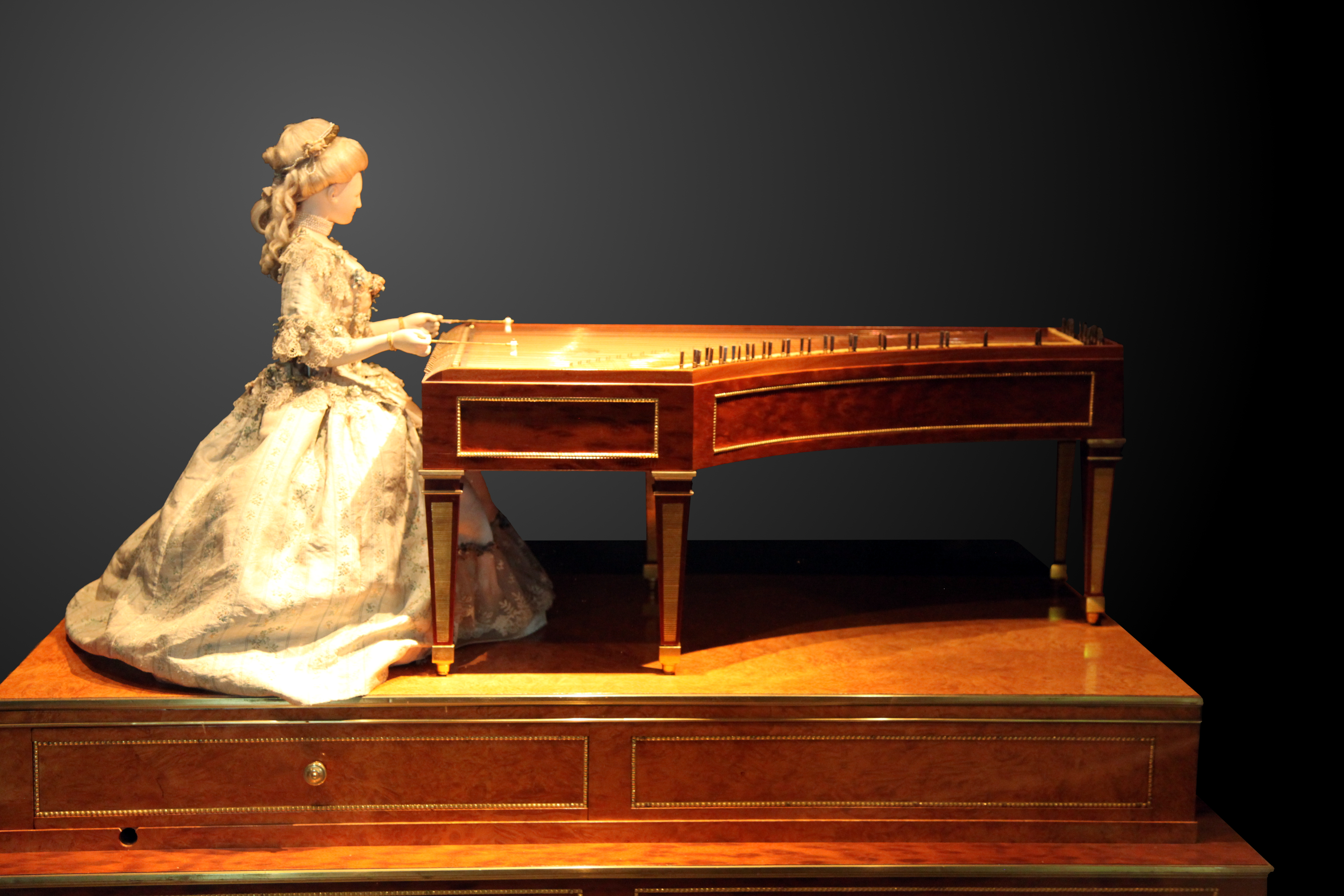
Automaton of a dulcimer player made by Kinzing in 1784, on display at Conservatoire national des arts et métiers.

Kinzing was born in Neuwied, Germany, and is supposed to have made his first pendulum clock at the age of ten. He began work with the German ébéniste David Roentgen circa 1770; Roentgen made the cases, and Kinzing produced the complicated mechanisms with automatic musical instruments, especially organs und dulcimers, a few carillons are also known of. In 1785 both were honored with titles from the French monarchy. Kinzing was called horloger de la reine (Clockmaker to the Queen).

Around 1785 Kinzing produced a series of longcase regulators with dials according to the plans of Benjamin Franklin, whom Kinzing and Roentgen probably became acquainted with in Paris. These clocks were housed in obelisk cases made by the Roentgen workshops. They were sold mainly to principalities in Central Europe. In Europe the clocks are called Franklin clocks. The quintessence of Kinzing's mechanical musical clocks was the series of so-called Apollo clocks. A superb example of an Apollo clock is to be found in the Roentgen Museum Neuwied Germany. Peter Kinzing is also known to have produced at least 2 equation month going regulators also in obelisk case, one of which is still situated in the Leipzig town hall. Kinzing was among the first German clockmakers to make precision regulators with equation movements in the contemporary French style.

Kinzing died in 1816 in Mannheim, Germany.
