= Rudolf Schwarz (architect) =

German architect

Rudolf Schwarz ca. 1930

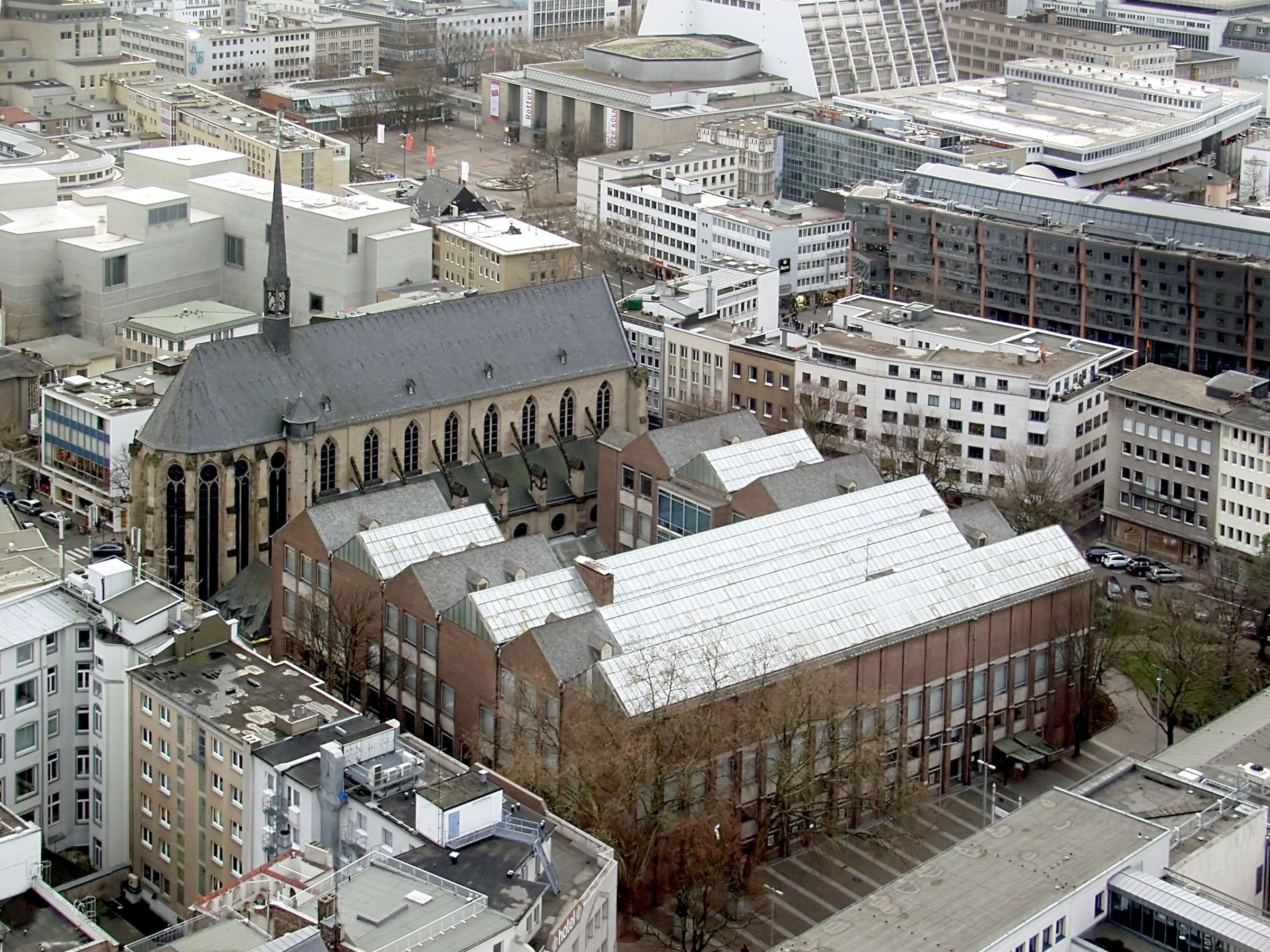
The Museum of Applied Art in Cologne, which was built in 1956 as Wallraf-Richartz Museum

Rudolf Schwarz (15 May 1897, Strasbourg – 3 April 1961, Cologne) was a German architect known for his work on Kirche St. Fronleichnam, Aachen. He also played a decisive part in the reconstruction of Cologne after the Second World War. He took a leading role with Cologne's reconstruction authority between 1947 and 1952, contributing to the rebuilding of the city with some of his own designs. Among these is the Wallraf-Richartz Museum (1956), which now houses the Museum of Applied Art. He also reconstructed the pilgrimage church of Saint Anne in Düren, near Aachen, which is probably his most famous work.

Schwarz worked with the German blacksmith Carl Wyland and closely with the Fr. Romano Guardini at Burg Rothenfels, where he designed the chapel for Quickborn, a large German Catholic youth movement run by Guardini.

His wife, Maria Schwarz, worked together with him and was in business as an architect, especially in reconstructing and modifying her husband's buildings.

== Architecture Principles ==
Rudolf Schwarz accompanies his architectural opus constantly with writings. Outstanding for the theoretical discussion are above all three books: Vom Bau der Kirche (1947; translated in English as The Church Incarnate), Von der Bebauung der Erde (1949) and finally Welt vor der Schwelle (1960), where he illustrates the continuity of building from geological stratification to architecture as the last layer of earth-building by human life. Schwarz establishes architecture in the sacred by understanding it as a reflection of a primordial images founded in creation. These archetypes reflect the basic conditions that have arisen in creation. The architecture is a spatial representation that evokes these archaic archetypes.

"The subject of this design is the age-old struggle between man and earth. In it, man stands for buoyancy, lightness and clarity against heaviness, darkness, unformedness – for the delicate against the massive. Extricating himself from the earth and her clutches, he renews victoriously the age-old legend."

Rudolf Schwarz defined, at least as far as the scope of his writings, an incomparable position on the nature of the sacred in architecture. In a sense this works as a renewed cosmogony based on the expression of a society that is constantly reinventing itself in the wake of an ever-evolving creative force. An important role for the development of the sacral dimension in the architecture of Rudolf Schwarz has the theologian Romano Guardini, who accompanied him from his first buildings.

== Bibliography ==
- Hendrik Brixius. "Kirche St. Fronleichnam Aachen (Architekt Rudolf Schwarz)" (in German). Hendrik.Brixius. Archived from the original on 2003-08-30.
- Steven J. Schloeder, Architecture in Communion: Implementing the Second Vatican Council through Liturgy and Architecture. San Francisco: Ignatius Press, 1998: 23-24 and 234-38. ISBN 0-89870-631-9.
- Alexander Henning Smolian: Weltanschauung und Planung am Beispiel des Architekten und Stadtplaners Rudolf Schwarz. Shaker Verlag, Aachen 2014, ISBN 978-3-8440-2871-3.
- Adam Caruso, Helen Thomas (Hg.): Rudolf Schwarz and the Monumental Order of Things. gta Verlag, Zürich 2016, ISBN 978-3-85676-362-6.
