= Louis-François Metra =

Louis-François Metra (1738 – 11 December 1804) was an 18th-century French journalist.

Banker and correspondent of Prussian king Frederick the Great, Metra mismanaged his business and took refuge in Neuwied, where he printed his weekly review Correspondance littéraire secrète for which he is mostly known. The French journalist De Beaunoir also wrote for the review.

Metra also collaborated with Nouvelliste politique d’Allemagne published in Cologne in 1780.

== Bibliography ==
- (in German) Karin Angelike, Louis-François Mettra Ein französischer Zeitungsverleger in Köln (1770-1800), Böhlau, 2002 (ISBN 3412133019)
- Mónica Hjortberg, « Correspondance littéraire secrète 1775-1793 : une présentation », Acta Universitatis Gothoburgensis, 1987 (ISBN 9173461997)
- Antoine Alexandre Barbier, Joseph-Marie Quérard, Dictionnaire des ouvrages anonymes, Paris, Féchoz et Letouzey, 1882, p. 775
