= Abraham Roentgen =

German cabinetmaker

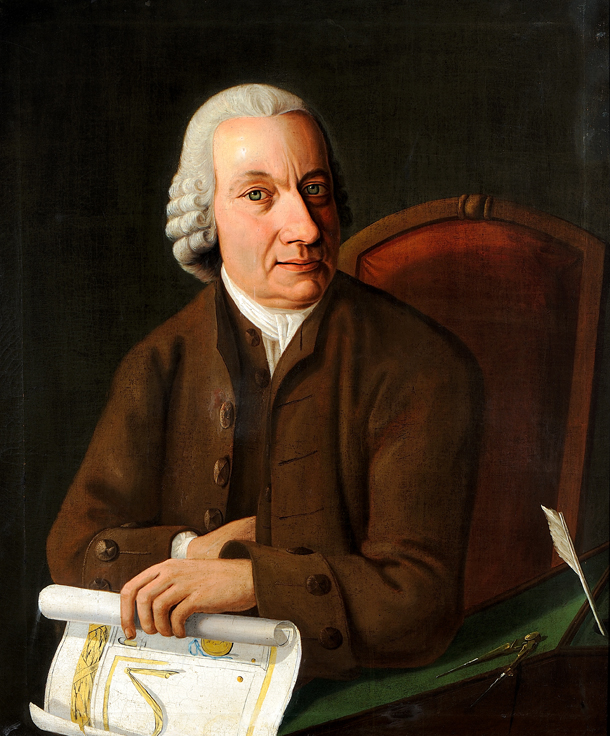
Abraham Roentgen.

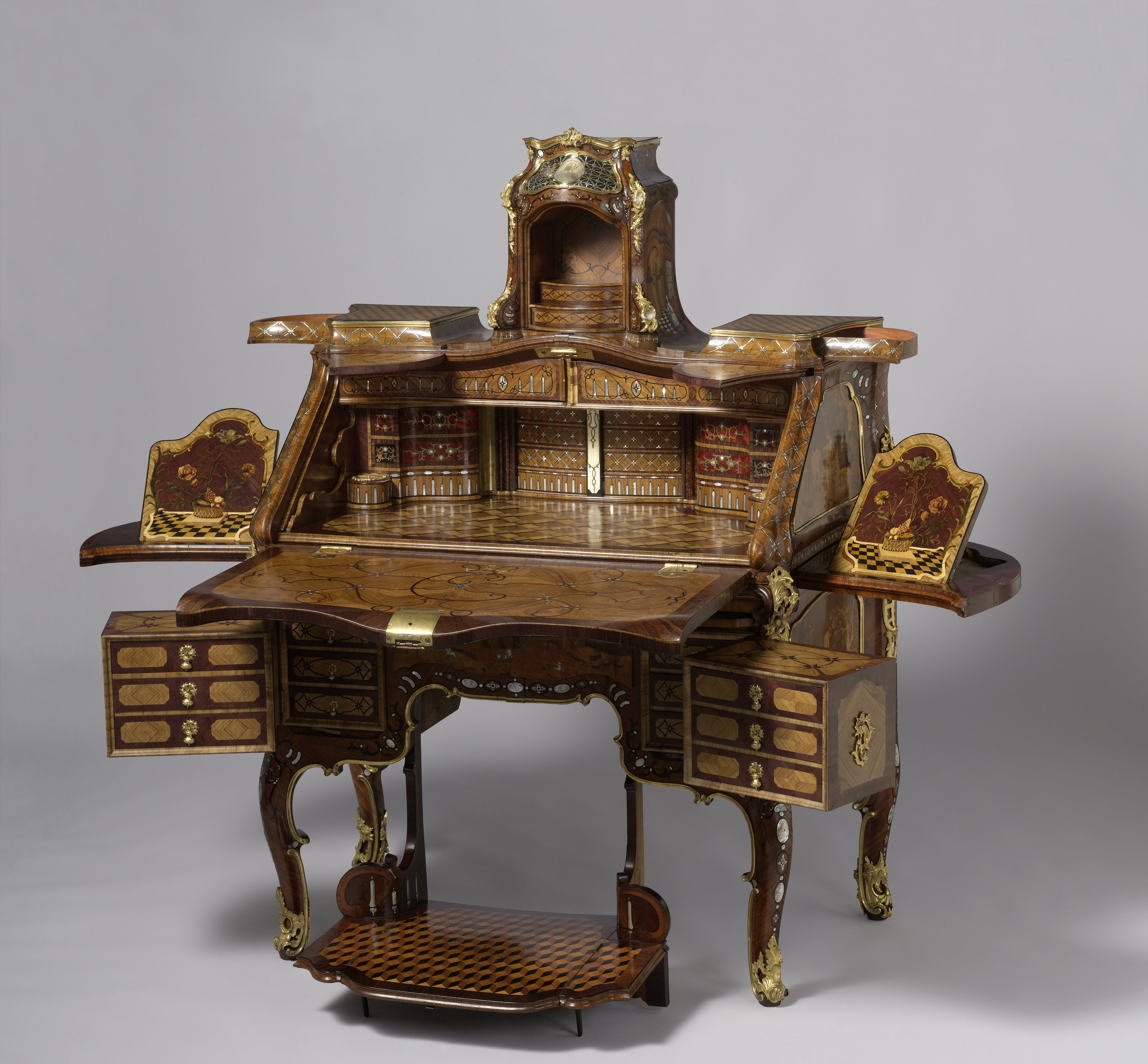
Table Bureau, ca. 1760. Rijksmuseum

Abraham Roentgen (30 January 1711 – 1 March 1793) was a German Ébéniste (cabinetmaker).

Roentgen was born in Mülheim am Rhein, Germany. He learned cabinet making from his father. At age 20, he traveled to The Hague, Rotterdam and Amsterdam, learning from established cabinet makers.

He became known for his marquetry work, and worked in London (in the workshop of William Gomm) until 1738. On 18 April 1739, he married Susanne Marie Bausch from Herrnhut. His son, David Roentgen, was born on 11 August 1743.

In 1753 they migrated to the Moravian settlement at Neuwied, near Koblenz, where he established a furniture manufactory.

Upon his retirement in 1772 his son David took over the business and established his own reputation.

Abraham Roentgen died in Herrnhut in Saxony Germany in 1793.

== Literature ==
  - Manuel Mayer: Die Verwirklichung eines Möbels. Der Schreibsekretär von Abraham Roentgen in der Residenz zu Würzburg, in: Mainfränkisches Jahrbuch für Kunst und Geschichte, Bd. 70, Archiv des Historischen Vereins für Unterfranken und Aschaffenburg, Bd. 141, Würzburg 2018, ISBN 978-3-88778-555-0, S. 239-259.
  - Wolfram Koeppe (Hg.): Extravagant Inventions. The Princely Furniture of the Roentgens, Exhibition catalogue, Metropolitan Museum of Art, New York 2012.
  - Heinrich Kreisel: Möbel von Abraham Roentgen, in: Wohnkunst und Hausrat, einst und jetzt, Bd. 5, Darmstadt, o. J.
  - Claus Bernet: Abraham Roentgen. In: Biographisch-Bibliographisches Kirchenlexikon (BBKL). Band 29, Bautz, Nordhausen 2008, ISBN 978-3-88309-452-6, Sp. 1177–1181.
  - Andreas Büttner, Ursula Weber-Woelk, Bernd Willscheid (Hg.): Edle Möbel für höchste Kreise - Roentgens Meisterwerke für Europas Höfe. Katalog des Roentgen-Museums Neuwied, Neuwied 2007, ISBN 3-9809797-5-X.
  - Andreas Büttner: Roentgen. Möbelkunst der Extraklasse, hrsg. von der Stadt Neuwied. Kehrein, Neuwied 2007, ISBN 978-3-934125-09-4.
  - Melanie Doderer-Winkler: Abraham und David Roentgen (1711–1793; 1743–1807), in: Rheinische Lebensbilder, Bd. 17, hrsg. von Franz-Josef Heyen, Köln 1997, S. 57–78.
  - Dietrich Fabian: Abraham und David Roentgen. Von der Schreinerwerkstatt zur Kunstmöbel-Manufaktur, Pfaehler, Bad Neustadt an der Saale 1992, ISBN 3-922923-87-9.
  - Detlev Richter, Bernd Willscheid: Reinheit, Feuer & Glanz - Stobwasser und Roentgen. Kunsthandwerk von Weltrang, Katalog des Roentgen-Museums Neuwied, Neuwied 2013, ISBN 978-3-9814662-5-6.
  - Peter Prange: Roentgen, Abraham. In: Neue Deutsche Biographie (NDB). Band 21, Duncker & Humblot, Berlin 2003, ISBN 3-428-11202-4, S. 730 f. (Digitalisat).
  - Wolfgang Thillmann, Bernd Willscheid (Hg.): Möbeldesign - Roentgen, Thonet und die Moderne, Katalog des Roentgen-Museums Neuwied, Neuwied 2011, ISBN 978-3-9809797-9-5.
