= Maria Schwarz =

German architect

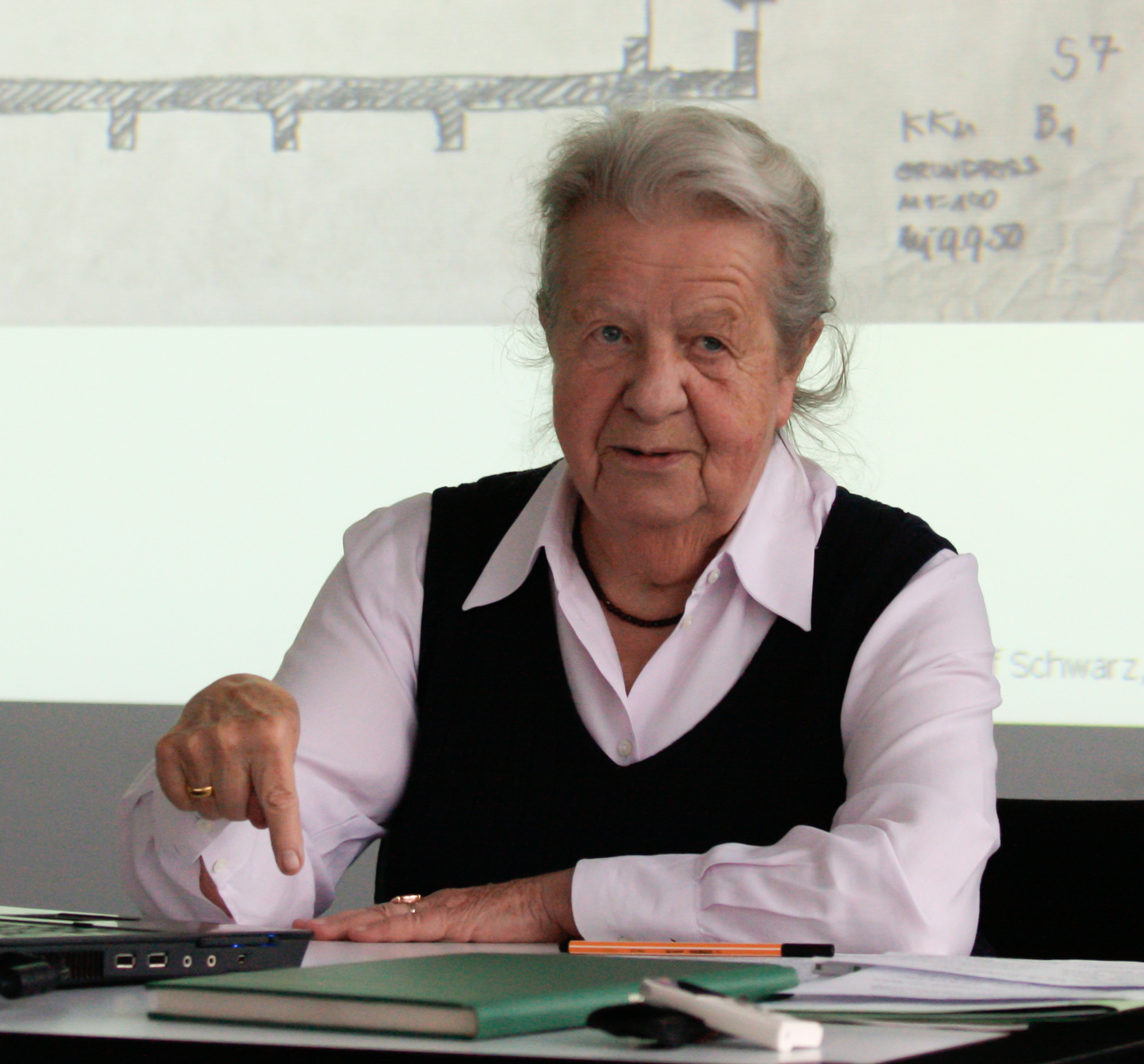
- Born: Maria Lang; 3 October 1921; Aachen
- Died: 15 February 2018 (aged 96)
- Spouse: Rudolf Schwarz

Maria Schwarz (1921–2018) was a German architect and professor best known for her church architecture.

Maria Lang was born on 3 October 1921 in Aachen, Germany. Her father, a contractor sparked her interest in architecture at a young age. In 1941, Lang enrolled in RWTH Aachen University, making her the first woman to study architecture at the school. She graduated for the university with a master's degree in 1946.

In 1949, Lang moved to Cologne to assist in the rebuilding of the city following World War II. In Cologne, Lang worked with fellow architect Rudolf Schwarz, whom she married in 1952.

Following their marriage, Maria Schwartz became a partner in her husband's office, where the couple collaborated on a number of projects until Rudolf's death in 1961.

In 1998 Schwartz joined the faculty of the Technical University of Munich.

Maria Schwarz died on 15 February 2018.
