= Neuwied =

- Town
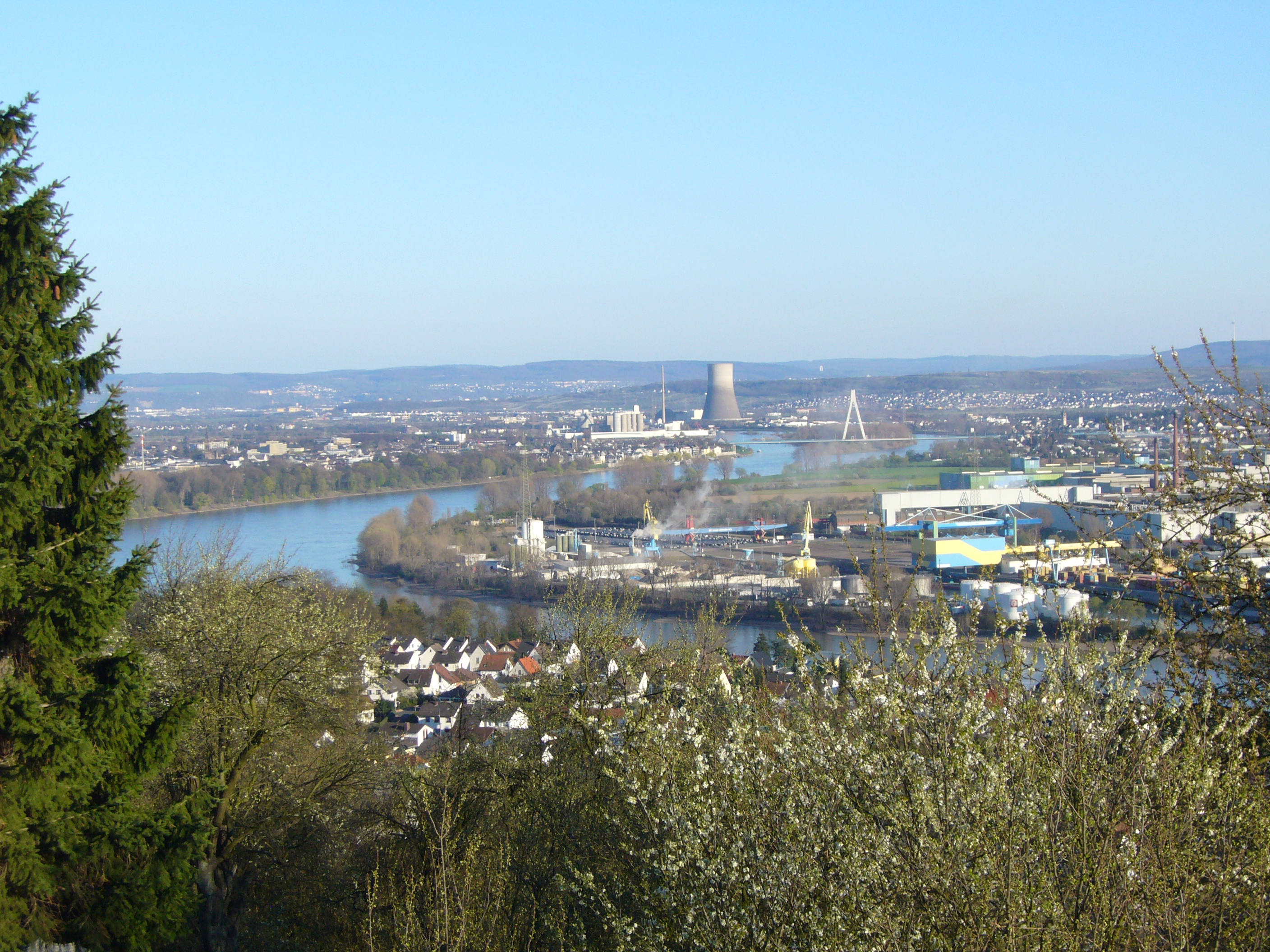
- Neuwied

- Flag Coat of arms

- Location of Neuwied within Neuwied district
- Interactive map of Neuwied
- Location within Germany Location within Rhineland-Palatinate
- Coordinates: 50°25′43″N 7°27′41″E
- Country: Germany
- State: Rhineland-Palatinate
- District: Neuwied
- Subdivisions: 13 Stadtteile

Government
  - Mayor (2017–25): Jan Einig (CDU)

Area
  - Total: 86.5 km^{2} (33.4 sq mi)
- Elevation: 60 m (200 ft)

Population (2025-12-31)
  - Total: 67,201
  - Density: 777/km^{2} (2,010/sq mi)
- Time zone: UTC+01:00 (CET)
  - Summer (DST): UTC+02:00 (CEST)
- Postal codes: 56501–56567
- Dialling codes: 02631 und 02622
- Vehicle registration: NR
- Website: www.neuwied.de

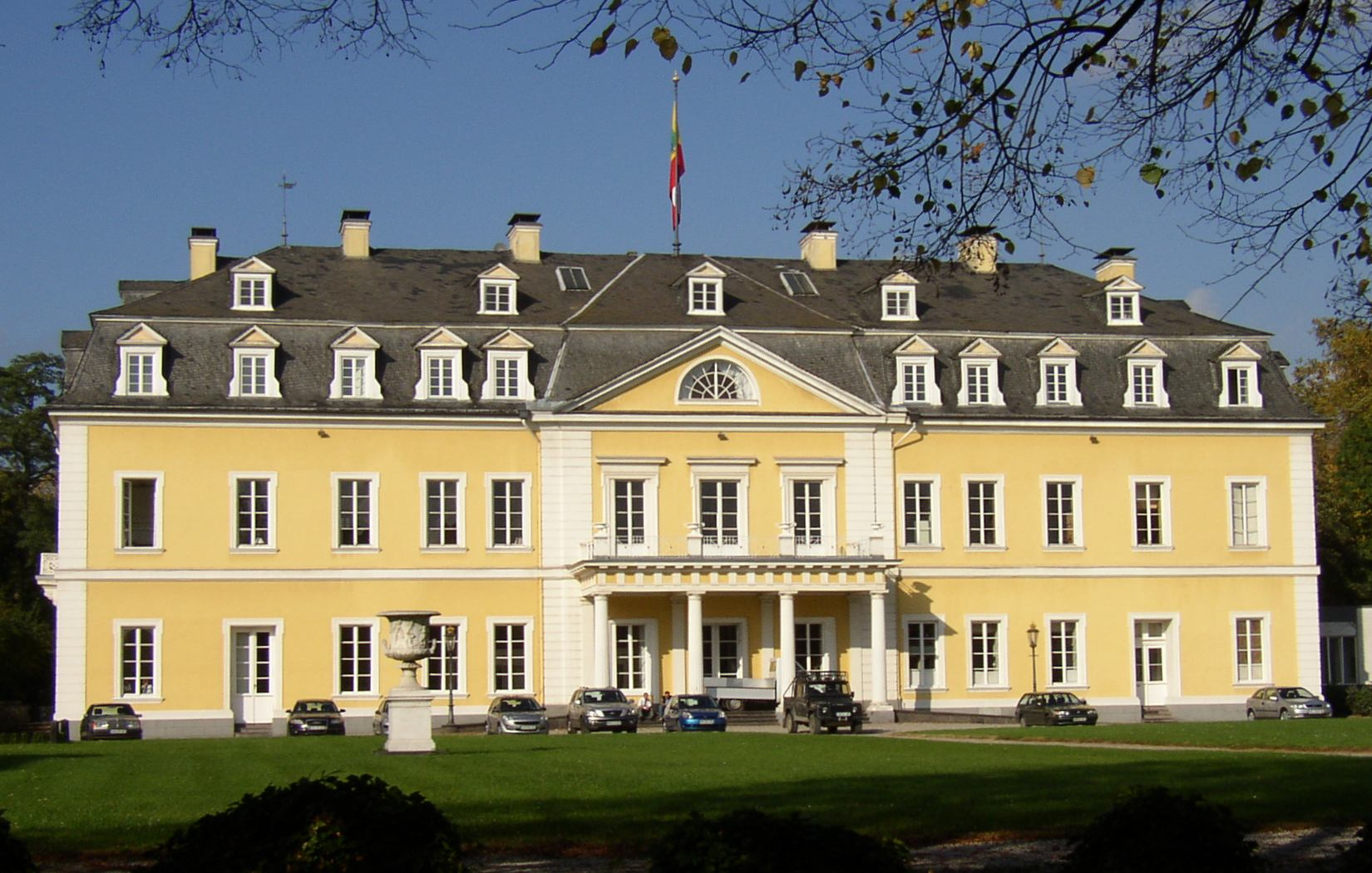
Neuwied Castle, residence of the Lower County of Wied

Map of Neuwied (c. 1790)

Neuwied (German pronunciation: [nɔʏˈviːt], lit. 'New Wied') is a town in the north of the German state of Rhineland-Palatinate, capital of the district of Neuwied. Neuwied lies on the east bank of the Rhine, 12 km northwest of Koblenz, on the railway from Frankfurt am Main to Cologne. The town has 13 suburban administrative districts: Heimbach-Weis, Gladbach, Engers, Oberbieber, Niederbieber, Torney, Segendorf, Altwied, Block, Irlich, Feldkirchen, Heddesdorf and Rodenbach. The largest is Heimbach-Weis, with approximately 8000 inhabitants.

== History ==
Near Neuwied, one of the largest Roman castra on the Rhine has been excavated by archeologists. Caesar's Rhine bridges are believed to have been built nearby.

Neuwied was founded in 1653 by Count Frederick III of Wied, initially as a fortress on the site of the village of Langendorf, which had been destroyed in the Thirty Years' War (1618–1648). It was to serve as the new residence of the lower county, secure its only access to the Rhine and enable the small state, impoverished in the war, to participate in Rhine trade. However, since the place hardly attracted any settlers due to its unfavourable location in a frequently flooded area, the counts of the House of Wied, especially Frederick III, Frederick William and John Frederick Alexander pursued a policy of self-administration and extensive religious tolerance in the town unlike in the rest of their territory. These liberties led to the immigration of numerous religious refugees from other German territories, but also from France and Switzerland, and to a rapid increase in the population. From the middle of the 18th century, members of seven religious communities lived in Neuwied: Calvinists, to which the count's house also belonged, Lutherans, Catholics, Mennonites, Inspirationalists, Moravian Brethren and Jews.

The refugees and their descendants contributed significantly to the economic upswing of the town in the 18th and 19th centuries. Handicraft products by the cabinetmakers Abraham and David Roentgen, who belonged to the Moravian Brethren, or the Mennonite clockmaker Peter Kinzing, were found at almost all important courts of Europe between Versailles and Saint Petersburg. Thanks to the foundation of the Rasselstein iron rolling mill by Count John Frederick Alexander, Neuwied was one of the first industrial locations in Germany.

On 18 April 1797, the French army, led by General Louis Lazare Hoche, defeated the Austrians under General Franz von Werneck at the Battle of Neuwied.

Neuwied is the native town of paternal ancestors of John D. Rockefeller, traced to the 16th century and possibly French Huguenot refugees. His father's line emigrated to the North American colonies, arriving in New York in 1710, the year of a massive immigration of nearly 2800 Palatine German refugees, whose transportation costs from London were covered by Queen Anne's British government. Neuwied was also the birthplace of William of Wied, who briefly held the title of King of Albania in 1914.

== Geography ==
Parts of the 86.5 square kilometre area are divided into the suburban districts of:

- Altwied
- Block
- Engers
- Feldkirchen
- Gladbach
- Heimbach-Weis
- Irlich
- Niederbieber
- Oberbieber
- Rodenbach
- Segendorf
- Torney

The core of Neuwied and the former village of Heddesdorf, which belonged to the municipality before these districts were added, are not listed as districts themselves.

The place of the abandoned former village of Rockenfeld, which is considered to be the origin and namesake of the famous Rockefeller family, also belongs to today's municipal territory of Neuwied.

Since the inner city of Neuwied is situated on a former bed of the Rhine river, it is at great risk of flooding. It is one of the very few towns in the region protected by flood-prevention levees, a source of friction with communities downstream.

Neuwied is twinned with the London Borough of Bromley.

== Politics ==
The 2019 municipal council elections led to the following distribution of seats: CDU (15), SPD (12), Greens (7), AfD (5), FWG (3), FDP (2), The Left (2), Ich tu's (2).

== Population ==
Originally, there were only a few thousand people living in Neuwied, with the number not growing significantly because of wars and famines. With the industrialisation in the 19th century, the number of inhabitants increased from 5,600 in 1831 to 18,000 in 1905.

By 1970, the figure had grown to 31,400, and following a major realignment incorporating several communities within the town, it jumped to 63,000.

As of 30 June 2005, there were officially 66,455 people living in Neuwied.

== Infrastructure ==
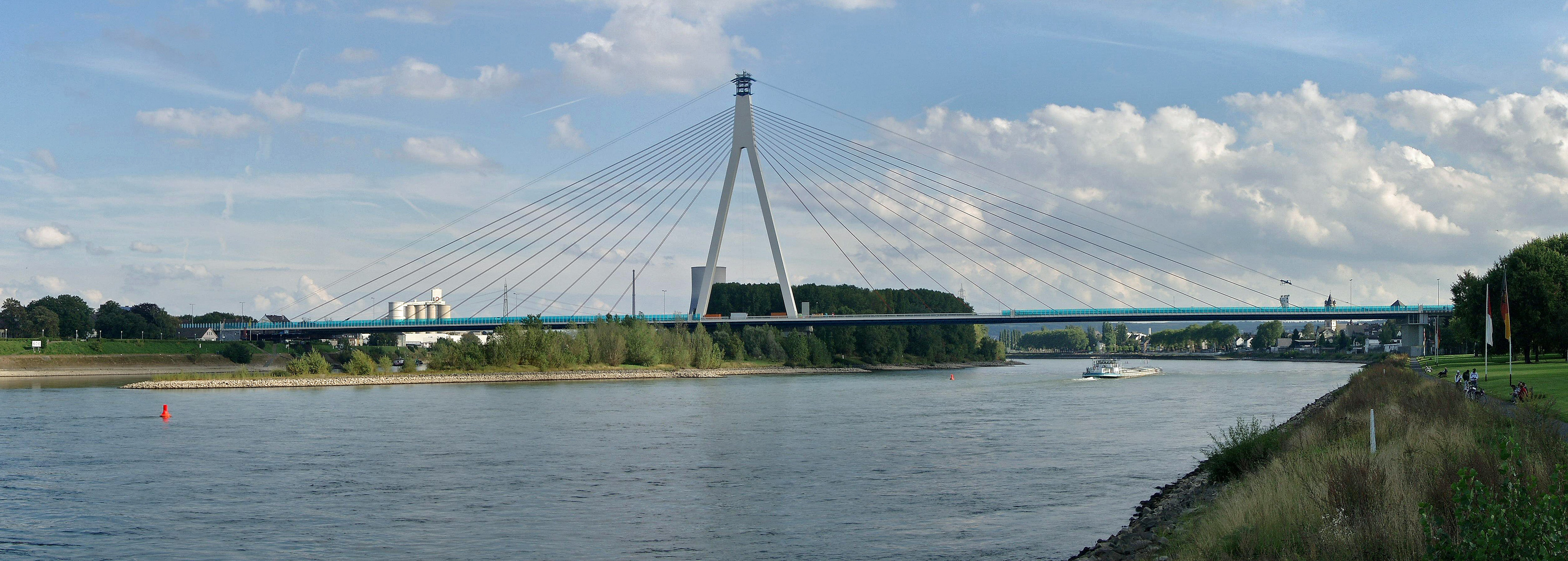
Raiffeisenbrücke between Neuwied and Weißenthurm

Neuwied is connected to the German network of Bundesstraßen (national routes) (here: B9, B42 and B256). The Autobahnen (motorways) A3, A48 and A61 are quickly reachable from Neuwied.

=== Public transport ===
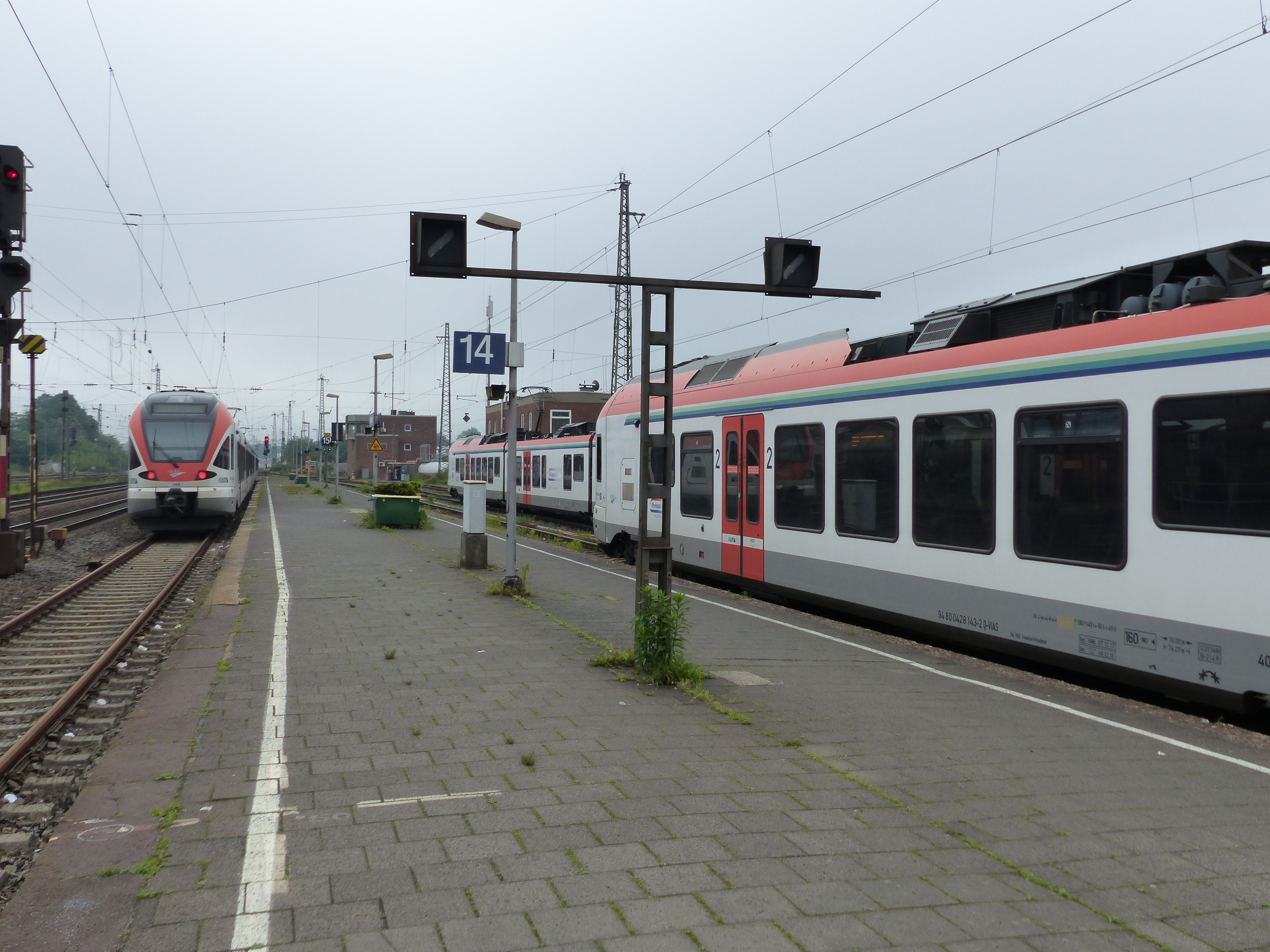
Neuwied station

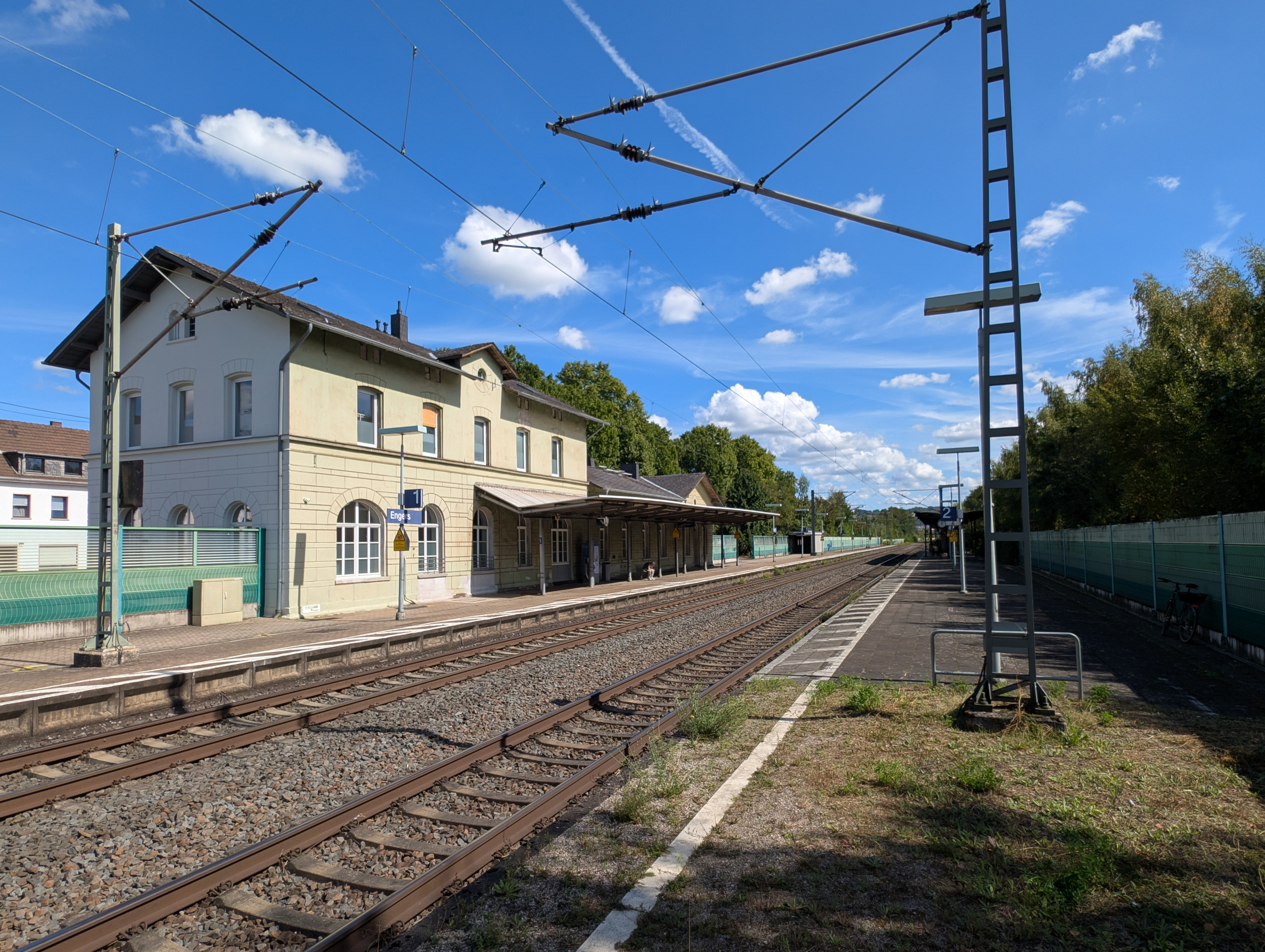
Engers station

Within the bounds of Neuwied are two railway stations, Neuwied and Engers on the Right Rhine line, and a third station is under consideration by the state agency for northern commuter railway services (SPNV Nord), which is responsible for the service on the railway lines connecting to Koblenz Hauptbahnhof in the south and Köln Hauptbahnhof in the north. Via either of those stations, the German high-speed rail network and the InterCity network are accessible. Daytime service includes the following:

- a Deutsche Bahn hourly semi-fast train (Regional-Express), the Rhein-Erft-Express, running Koblenz-Engers-Neuwied-Cologne-Mönchengladbach and back;
- and a Deutsche Bahn hourly all-stops service (Regionalbahn) Koblenz-Neuwied-Cologne-Stommeln(-Mönchengladbach) and back, which is also available in the evening hours;
- a VIAS hourly semi-fast train (StadtExpress) Neuwied-Koblenz-Lahnstein-Wiesbaden(-Frankfurt) and back, running also in evening hours.

It takes about 15 to 20 minutes to travel to Koblenz, while Cologne is about 70 to 80 minutes away, Mainz 90 to 120 minutes, direct connection to Frankfurt is around 150 minutes, sometimes faster when changing to the IC/ICE network.

Public transport within Neuwied relies on a bus network, offering (depending on line) 20, 30 or 60-minute schedules; the majority of lines are served by Transdev.

All public transport (road and rail) is integrated into the Verkehrsverbund Rhein-Mosel (VRM) public transport association. Tickets are valid for all services, restricted by time and fare zones. For more information on timetables, see.

Zweckverband SPNV Nord plans a new, straight railway line from Neuwied via Engers, Ransbach-Baumbach, Siershahn and Wirges to Montabaur station, which runs most of its distance on the Engers-Au railway.

== Twin towns – sister cities ==
Neuwied is twinned with:

- Bromley, England, United Kingdom
- Drom HaSharon, Israel
- Güstrow, Germany
- Suqian, China

== Notable people ==
- Hermann of Wied (1477–1552), archbishop-elector of Cologne, reformer
- Gotthard Rockenfeller (1590–1695), ancestor of John D. Rockefeller
- Louis-François Metra (1738–1804), French journalist
- De Beaunoir (1746–1823), French playwright
- David Roentgen (1743–1807), cabinetmaker
- Peter Kinzing (1745–1816), watchmaker and mechanic
- Johannes Baptista von Albertini (1769–1831), Bishop of Moravian Church
- Prince Maximilian of Wied-Neuwied (1782–1867), naturalist, botanist, ethnologist
- Philipp Wilhelm Wirtgen (1806–1870), botanist
- Hermann, Prince of Wied (1814–1864), nobleman
- Elisabeth of Wied (1843–1916), Queen of Romania and poet
- William, Prince of Wied (1845–1907), nobleman, officer and politician
- Ferdinand Hueppe (1852–1938), co-founder of the DFB and sports medicine
- Paul Reichard (1854–1938), African researcher
- Friedrich von Ingenohl (1857–1933), admiral, commander of the imperial High Seas Fleet in World War I
- Ferdinand Siegert (1865–1946), pediatrician
- Carl von Moers (1871–1957), horse rider
- Wilhelm, Prince of Albania (1876–1945), sovereign prince of Albania
- Carl Einstein (1885–1940), writer, art historian and critic
- Friedrich Wolf (1888–1953), doctor and writer
- Walter Kaiser (1907–1982), footballer
- Horst Siebert (1938–2009), economist
- Klaus Rudolf Werhand (1938–2009), metalsmith and coppersmith
- Renate Freund (born 1939), writer
- Monika Kropshofer (born 1952), painter and photographer
- Jörg Bewersdorff (born 1958), mathematician
- Thomas J. Kinne (born 1961), translator, author and quiz player
- Helmut Dieser (born 1962), Roman Catholic bishop in Aachen
- Ulf Mark Schneider (born 1965), manager and CEO of Nestlé
- Martin Werhand (born 1968), publisher, editor and writer
- Ferris MC (born 1973), musician, rapper and actor
- Christian Ulmen (born 1975), entertainer and actor
- Simon Kirch (born 1979), track and field athlete
- Mike Rockenfeller (born 1983), race car driver
- Tobias Nickenig (born 1984), footballer
- Tobias Hegewald (born 1989), racing driver
- Hasan Ali Kaldırım (born 1989), Turkish footballer
- Anna-Lena Friedsam (born 1994), tennis player
- Isaac Bonga (born 1999), basketball player

== See also ==
- Synagogue District, Neuwied

== Sources ==
- Eggenberger, David (1985). An Encyclopedia of Battles. New York: Dover Publications. ISBN 0-486-24913-1.
