= Flückiger =

Flückiger is a habitational surname for someone from a place near Bern in Switzerland called Flückingen. Notable people with the surname include:

- Friedrich August Flückiger (1828–1894), Swiss pharmacist, chemist and botanist
- Hans Flückiger (born 1926), Swiss cyclist
- Marcel Flückiger (1929–2010), Swiss footballer
- Mathias Flückiger (born 1988), Swiss mountain bike racer
- Lukas Flückiger (born 1984), Swiss mountain bike racer
- Pierre-André Flückiger (born 1919), Swiss sports shooter
- Sylvia Flückiger-Bäni (born 1952), Swiss politician
- Yves Flückiger (born 1955), Swiss economist
