= János Gausz =

Hungarian geneticist

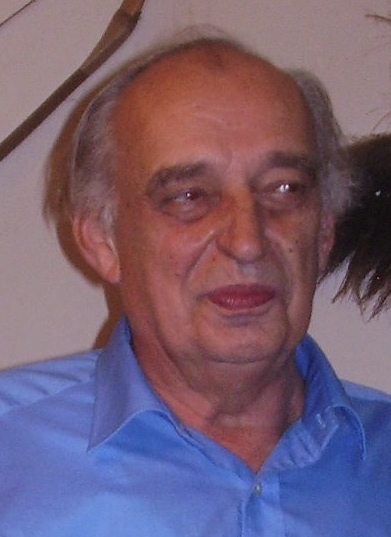
- János Gausz in 2013
- Born: October 7, 1943; Novi Sad
- Died: December 12, 2021 (aged 78); Szeged
- Citizenship: Hungarian Hungary
- Education: University of Szeged
- Known for: Drosophila genetics
- Children: Péter (1970), Ildikó (1972)
- Awards: Academic Prize (1993); Széchenyi Professorial Scholarship (1998); Brunó Ferenc Straub Prize (1999); János Szentágothai Prize (2002)
- Scientific career
- Fields: Biological sciences
- Workplaces: Biological Research Centre (Hungarian Academy of Sciences); University of Szeged; Biozentrum University of Basel; University of Geneva; Princeton University

János Gausz (7 October 1943 – 12 November 2021) was a Hungarian geneticist and member of the academic staff at the University of Szeged. He worked for decades at the Institute of Genetics of the Biological Research Centre of Szeged, where he was a founding member of the Developmental Genetics Group in 1970 and later on became senior research fellow and scientific advisor, leading the Insect Genetics Group that initiated Drosophila research in Hungary. In addition to his research career, he was university lecturer at the University of Szeged and obtained the Doctor of Biological Sciences (DSc) degree from the Hungarian Academy of Sciences.

== Early life and education ==
János Gausz was born on 7 October 1943 in Novi Sad. After World War II, his family relocated to Szeged, where his uncle, Lajos Horváth, served as deputy principal of Szent Imre College and later on became a synod judge. Gausz attended the Madách Street Primary School, and completed his secondary education at Radnóti Miklós Secondary Grammar School, graduating in 1962. He received a degree in biology and chemistry from József Attila University of Sciences (now the University of Szeged) in 1967.

== Career ==
After receiving his teaching degree, Gausz began working at the Department of Experimental Physics of József Attila University as a scholarship trainee, and later on as a research assistant at the Department of Zootaxy. He defended his doctoral thesis in 1967. In 1970 he joined the Institute of Genetics of the Biological Research Centre of Szeged as a founding member. Within the institute he worked in the Developmental Genetics Group, later on serving as senior research fellow and scientific advisor, and leading the Insect Genetics Group, which focused on Drosophila research in Hungary. In 1982, he earned the Candidate of Biological Sciences degree, followed in 1995 by the Doctor of Biological Sciences degree from the Hungarian Academy of Sciences.

== Educational activities ==
From 1989 onwards, Gausz taught genetics and related courses, including developmental biology, advanced genetics, developmental and cellular genetics, and the history of genetics, at the Department of Genetics of József Attila University of Sciences, and later on at the Faculty of Natural Sciences and Informatics of the University of Szeged. For his teaching activities he was awarded the Széchenyi Professorship Scholarship. Following his retirement from the Centre for Biological Research of the Hungarian Academy of Sciences in Szeged, he continued to contribute to undergraduate and postgraduate teaching at the Department of Genetics of the University of Szeged between 2010 and 2020. In 2015, he was awarded the honorary title of University Lecturer.

== Field of research ==
Gausz's early research dealt with the zoology and ecology of Orthoptera insects. At the Centre for Biological Research in Szeged he shifted his focus to Drosophila genetics. His studies addressed heat shock genes, genes influencing positional effect variation, homeotic genes, and protein phosphatase genes. His publications appeared in journals including Cell, Nature, Genetics, The EMBO Journal and Development.

== Research abroad ==
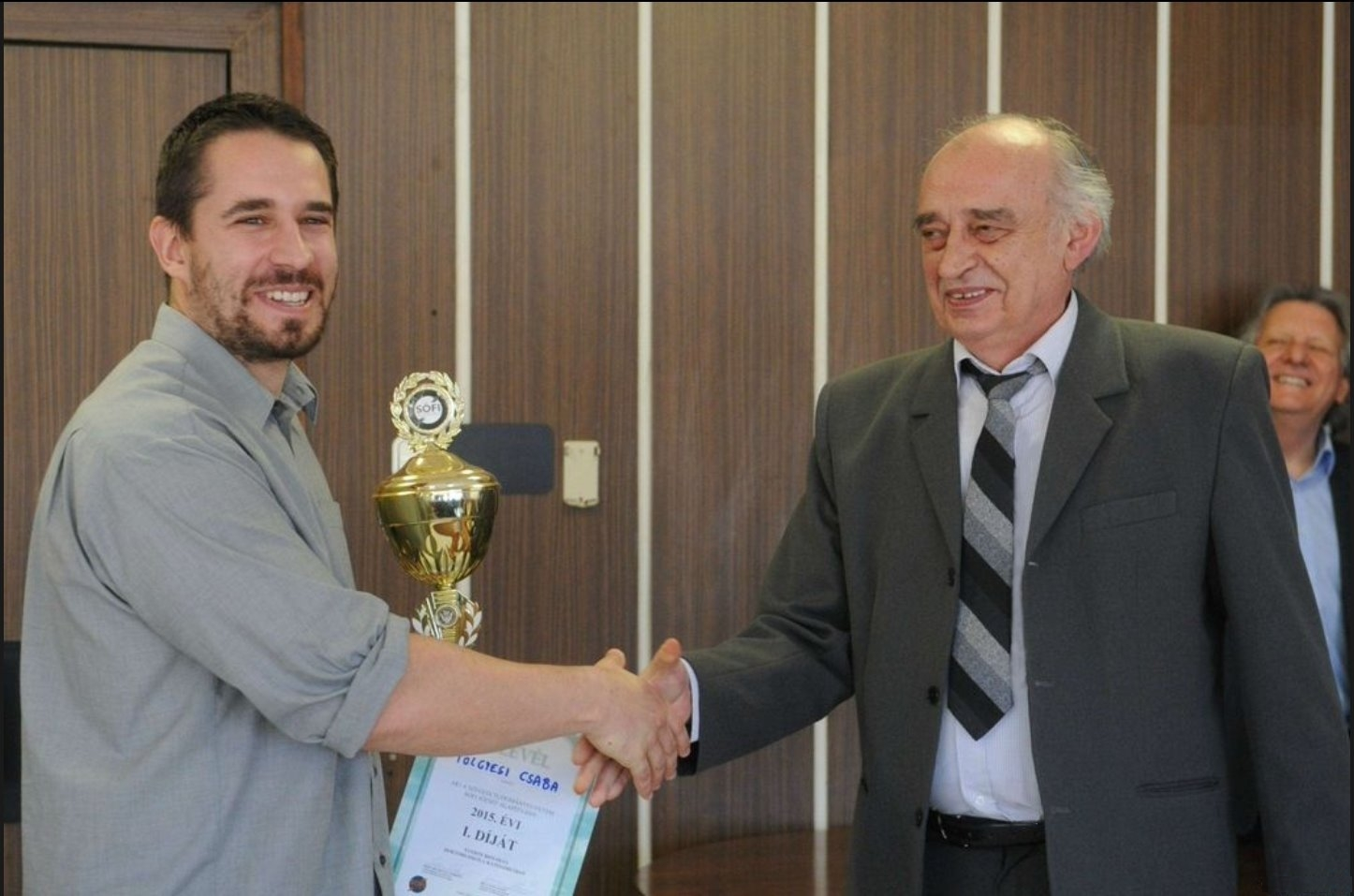
János Gausz presents the first prize of the Sófi Foundation to Csaba Tölgyesi in 2015

Gausz held research positions at several international research institutions. As a post-doctoral fellow, he worked in the laboratory of Walter Gehring at the Institute of Cell Biology, Biozentrum der Universität Basel. As a senior researcher, he worked at the Institute of Animal Biology, University of Geneva, in the laboratory of Pierre Spierer. Later on he was a visiting professor at the Institute of Molecular Biology, Princeton University, in the laboratory of Paul Schedl.

== Memberships ==
Gausz served as a member of the Habilitation Committee of the University of Szeged for two years. He was a member of the (Batthyány Society of Professors) and acted as an opponent and committee member in several doctoral procedures. For several years, he chaired the Genetics Committee of the Hungarian Academy of Sciences and was a board member of the Hungarian Geneticists' Association. He also served as president of the Biological Society of Szeged.

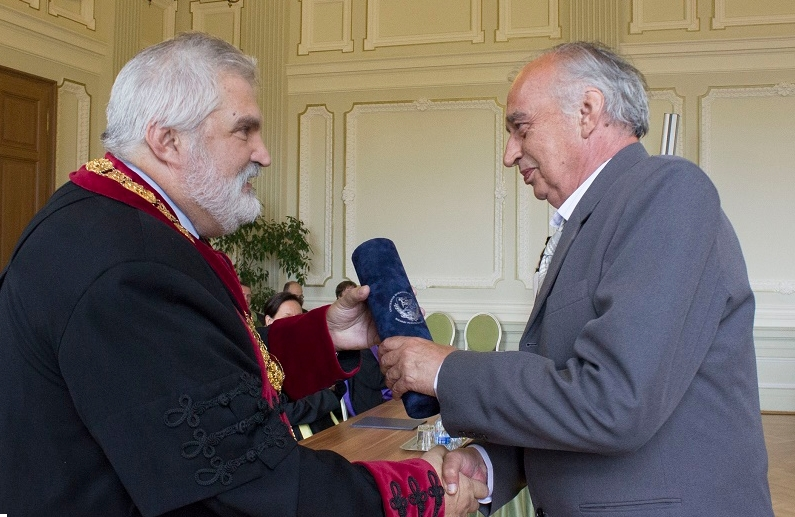
János Gausz receives his Private University Lecturer diploma from Rector Gábor Szabó in 2015

== Selected works ==
- History of genetics. JATEPress, Szeged, 2012. 117 pp.

== Awards ==
- Academic Prize (1993)
- Széchenyi Professorial Scholarship (1998)
- Brunó Ferenc Straub Prize (1999)
- János Szentágothai Prize (2002)

== Sources ==
- Szegedi Egyetemi Almanach (1921–1995) [University Almanac of Szeged (1921–1995). Szeged: University of Szeged, 1996, pp. 290–291. (in Hungarian)
