= Mária Wollemann =

Hungarian biochemist

- Born: 6 July 1923; Budapest, Hungary
- Died: 5 October 2019 (aged 96)
- Occupations: Biochemist; neuroscientist

Academic background
- Education: University of Szeged; Pázmány Péter Catholic University

Academic work
- Discipline: Biochemistry
- Sub-discipline: Neurochemistry; neuropharmacology
- Institutions: Royal Hungarian Pázmány Péter University; Hungarian Academy of Sciences; National Institute of Neurosurgery; Biological Research Centre

Mária Wollemann (6 July 1923 – 5 October 2019) was a Hungarian biochemist and neuroscientist who specialised in neurochemistry and neuropharmacology. A student of Nobel Prize winner Albert Szent-Györgyi at the University of Szeged, she worked at the National Institute of Neurosurgery from 1954 until 1970 and was director of the Biological Research Centre from 1978 until 1983.

== Biography ==
Born in Budapest on 6 July 1923, Mária Wollemann studied medicine at the University of Szeged under Nobel Prize winner Albert Szent-Györgyi and at the Pázmány Péter Catholic University, obtaining her Doctor of Medicine degree from the latter in 1947. After working at the Royal Hungarian Pázmány Péter University and the Hungarian Academy of Sciences (1948–1949), Wollemann started working at the National Institute of Neurosurgery (OMIII) in 1954, remaining there until 1970. During her time at OMIII, she had a few short overseas stints as a researcher at the Humboldt University of Berlin (1956–1957), Montefiore Medical Center (1963–1964), and Hôpital Boucicaut in Paris (1966). After moving to the Biological Research Centre (BRC) in Szeged in 1971, she was a group leader and deputy director there, before serving as director from 1978 until 1983.

As an academic, Wollemann specialised in neurochemistry and neuropharmacology, having focused on these areas during her work at the BRC. In 1974, her doctoral dissertation was later published as a book, Biochemistry of Brain Tumours. She won the Akadémiai Díj in 1977.

After being inducted to the Hungarian Order of Merit with the Officer's Cross in 1994, Wollemann was promoted to Commander's Cross in 2003. In 2004, Acta Biologica Hungarica published a festschrift volume for her 80th birthday. In addition to a 2017 commemorative medal for services to the city's international relations, she was a 2019 honorary citizen of Szeged.

Wollemann died on 5 October 2019, aged 96. Her funeral was subsequently held at the cemetery in Belváros, a neighbourhood in Szeged.
