= Bertrand Bouvier =

Swiss writer and translator (1929–2025)

- Born: 6 November 1929; Zurich, Switzerland
- Died: 3 January 2025 (aged 95); Geneva, Switzerland
- Education: University of Geneva
- Occupation(s): Writer; Translator

Bertrand Bouvier (6 November 1929 – 3 January 2025) was a Swiss writer and translator who specialized in Modern Greek.

== Life and career ==
Born in Zurich on 6 November 1929, Bouvier's father was pastor André Bouvier. His cousin was author Nicolas Bouvier and his grandfather was publisher Bernard Bouvier, who served as rector of the University of Geneva Faculty of Letters from 1906 to 1908. He studied classics at the University of Geneva, earning a licence in 1952 and a doctorate in 1974 with a thesis titled Le mirologue de la Vierge : chansons et poèmes grecs sur la passion du Christ.

From 1956 to 1975, Bouvier taught Ancient Greek at the Collège de Genève and at the same time taught at the Faculty of Translation and Interpreting of the University of Geneva. In 1976, he was appointed an extraordinary professor of Modern Greek literature and succeeded Samuel Baud-Bovy as a full professor from 1979 to 1995. Throughout his career, he translated numerous works from Greek into French, principally studying the works of Andreas Kalvos. He also collaborated with François Bovon on researching the Biblical apocrypha.

Bouvier died in Geneva on 3 January 2025, at the age of 95.

== Distinctions ==
- Honorary doctorate from the University of Cyprus (2008)
- Honorary doctorate from the Aristotle University of Thessaloniki (2016)

== Decorations ==
- Commander of the Order of the Phoenix (1998)

== Publications ==
- Cnemon le misanthrope (le Dyscolos) (1960)
- Δημοτικά τραγούδια από χειρόγραφο της Μονής των Ιβήρων (1960)
- Poètes contemporains de Salonique (1962)
- Fragment hymnographique d'un papyrus de Genève (1975)
- Un philosophe romain, un savant moine de Byzance, un helléniste genevois : Bétant, éditeur de Planude, traducteur de Boèce (1975)
- Le mirologue de la Vierge : Chansons et poèmes grecs sur la passion du Christ (1976)
- Actes de l’apôtre Philippe (1996)
- The critical edition of Q: synopsis including the Gospels of Matthew and Luke, Mark and Thomas with English, German, and French translations of Q and Thomas (2000)
- Samuel Baud-Bovy, 1906–1986 : néohelléniste, ethnomusicologue, musicien (2016)
