= Faculty of Translation and Interpreting of the University of Geneva =

School in University of Geneva, Switzerland

Faculty of Translation and Interpreting (FTI)
- Faculté de traduction et d'interprétation (FTI)
- Former names: School of Translation and Interpreting (ETI)
- Type: public
- Established: 1941
- Founder: Antoine Velleman
- Parent institution: University of Geneva in Switzerland
- Location: Geneva, Switzerland; 46°11′41″N 6°08′25″E
- Language: Arabic, English, French, German, Italian, Spanish and Russian
- Colours: Orange
- Website: www.unige.ch/fti
- Geographical location of the Faculty of Translation and Interpreting (FTI)

The Faculty of Translation and Interpreting (FTI) is a faculty of the University of Geneva in Switzerland.

== Introduction ==
The FTI is located on the sixth floor of the University of Geneva's Uni Mail building.

The Faculty of Translation and Interpreting (FTI) is one of the oldest translation and interpreting education and research institutions in the world. It was founded in 1941, by Antoine Velleman, as the Ecole d’interprètes de Genève (EIG). When a translation degree was introduced in 1972, it became the École de traduction et d’interprétation (School of Translation and Interpreting - ETI), before adopting its current title – Faculty of Translation and Interpreting – in 2011.

"Mr. Velleman was more than qualified to set up and direct the school, which he predicted would expand rapidly as Switzerland prepared itself for post-war recovery. Furthermore, Geneva, with its tradition of international collaboration, offered plenty of advantages to successfully bring about such a project. Before the Second World War, only one other school of its kind existed – a school that was founded in 1930 in Mannheim by Swiss professor Dr. Charles Glauser and was attached to the University of Heidelberg in 1936."

— S. Stelling-Michaud, L’École d’interprètes de 1941 à 1956.

Initially a part of the Faculty of Humanities, the EIG broke away from the faculty between 1953 and 1955, and eventually became an independent institution of the university. Today, the FTI has over a hundred teachers and researchers.

== Location ==
Up until 1946, the school's administrative offices were located in Antoine Velleman's office at 5 Avenue Marc-Monnier, then in an apartment at 4 Rue Saint-Victor. Three rooms and the hallway were used for the school, while three other rooms were reserved for administrative purposes. From 1952 to 1953, the university was renovated and the school's administrative offices were set up on the former premises of the physics institute (ground floor). In 1978, the school moved to the Cours Commerciaux de Genève building at 19 Place des Augustins. It then moved to the new Uni Mail building at 40 Boulevard du Pont-d'Arve in 1992.

== Resources and services ==
Students have access to IT and audiovisual resources, as well as a library specialized in translation studies, translation (theory, history, education, etc.), consecutive and simultaneous interpreting, sign language interpreting, computational linguistics, terminology and lexicology.

=== Library ===
The Translation and Interpreting section of the University of Geneva library is located on the second floor of Uni-Mail. Students can consult and take out books on subjects taught at the FTI, specialized and language dictionaries, and journals. Since 1984, the library has been a part of RERO, a network of libraries in Western Switzerland. It uses the Dewey Decimal System.

The first FTI library was made up of Antoine Velleman's own personal collection of works, which he kept in his office on Avenue Marc-Monnier and would lend out to students.

"Antoine Velleman made his library available to the first students, who – with much emotion – recall learning things from dictionaries, books and journals annotated in Velleman’s own hand. For years, there was no one there in that room… We had the key to the library (several of us were almost always gathered around the table), no one monitored us. And I don’t think many of those books disappeared…"

— Gérard Ilg, cited in Duret.

In 1953, a room in the basement of the Bastions building on Rue de Candolle was converted into a library. The library truly became specialized, providing access to a collection of dictionaries (monolingual, bilingual, technical) and documents on the International Organizations. When the school moved to the Cours Commerciaux de Genève building in 1978, the library was equipped with computers, cassette tapes containing interpreting exercises and CD-ROMs.

=== Simultaneous interpreting ===
Antoine Velleman was not in favour of simultaneous interpreting and so, initially, only consecutive interpreting classes were offered by the school. Graduates of the programme took it upon themselves to organize simultaneous interpreting training sessions in the evenings. The school's alumni association (AAEDEI) contacted IBM to set up an interpreting booth. The training sessions took place in a room rented on the ground floor of a Methodist church at 12 Rue Calvin. Sessions took place regularly from 1947 onwards. Each participant had to pay three francs per session in order to cover the cost of constructing the booth and renting the room. It was not until 1950 that the first simultaneous interpreting classes were officially offered at the school by Serge Gloor.

In 1952, the school acquired simultaneous interpreting equipment, thanks to a donation from IBM. On 4 February 1953, a new simultaneous interpreting training room was inaugurated in the basement of Uni Bastions. The room was equipped with ten booths and a control box, which was integrated into the teacher's desk, allowing the teacher to monitor each booth.

Today, the faculty has a virtual teaching platform that allows simultaneous interpreting to be taught at a distance. The application gives users access to digitized speeches, a forum, a chat system and a space for teachers to give feedback to students. Students can listen back to the original speech as well as their interpretation of it.

== FTI Programmes ==
The faculty offers the following programmes: Bachelor of Arts in Multilingual Communication, Master of Arts in Translation, Master of Arts in Conference Interpreting, Complementary Certificate in Translation. Students make up their language combination based on the languages offered by the faculty, which are German, English, Arabic, Spanish, French, Italian and Russian.

Besides translation and conference interpreting, the programmes offered by the faculty can lead to careers in multilingual communication, public relations, the media, public administration, tourism, the court system, language mediation services, education and research.

== Exchange programmes ==
The FTI has exchange agreements with 70 universities in over 20 countries.

== Research ==
In the first few years of its existence, the school was mostly geared towards professional training, but today, it carries out research in a variety of different fields.

=== Research groups ===
FTI's research groups are currently leading projects financed by the European Union and the Swiss National Science Foundation. The Centre for Legal and Institutional Translation Studies (Transius) specializes in legal and institutional translation. The "Economics, Languages and Education" research group (Observatoire élf) looks into linguistic diversity management. The Department of Translation Technology (TIM) works with translation technology, speech recognition in language learning, terminology and lexicology. The Interpreting Department carries out projects on interpreting, cognition and humanitarian aspects of interpreting.

=== PhD Programme ===
The FTI has a PhD programme with specializations in translation studies, multilingual information processing, conference interpreting, and multilingual communication management.

== Local and international relations ==
=== Continuing education ===
The FTI offers continuing education degree and certificate programmes in translation studies, translation methodology, translation (financial, legal, technical and literary), writing (active and passive languages), technical writing, computer-assisted translation, terminology and interpreting.

=== European and international networks ===
The FTI is a member of a number of European and international networks, including:

- UN University Outreach Programme;
- European Masters in Conference Interpreting (EMCI);
- European Masters in Translation (EMT);
- Conférence internationale permanente d'instituts universitaires de traducteurs et interprètes (CIUTI);
- Universities Contact Group of the International Annual Meeting on Language Arrangements, Documentation and Publications (IAMLADP).

=== Technological innovation ===
The FTI collaborates with the city of Geneva on technologically innovative projects. BabelDr, a collaboration between the FTI and Geneva's University Hospitals, won the Innogap prize in 2015.

== Bibliography ==
=== Books ===
- Capel Esteve, Carmen M.; Chazal, Axelle (2010). Les études en interprétation de conférence à l'ETI: Avant, pendant et après (dissertation for the Master of Arts in Conference Interpreting) (in French). Geneva: University of Geneva.
- Duret, Patrice (1998a). L'École de traduction et d'interprétation et sa bibliothèque (1941-1993): dossiers documentaires et brochure historique: rapport (final-year project) (in French). Geneva: Association des bibliothèques et bibliothécaires suisses.
- Duret, Patrice (1998b). L'ETI: toute une histoire... L'École de traduction et d'interprétation de 1941 à 1993 (unpublished final-year project) (in French). Geneva: Bibliothèque de l'École de traduction et d'interprétation.
- Martin, Paul-Edmond (1958). "XXXII - L'école d'interprètes (1948-1955)". L'Université de 1914 à 1956 (in French). Geneva. pp. 293–296.
- Rumprecht, Katrin (2008). "Die Nürnberger Prozesse und ihre Bedeutung für die Entwicklung des modernen Konferenzdolmetschens". In Hartwig Kalverkämper and Larisa Schippel (dir.) (ed.). Simultandolmetschen in Erstbewährung: Der Nürnberger Prozess 1945 (chapter) (in German). Berlin: Frank & Timme. pp. 264–265.
- Die Dolmetscherschule in Genf (in German). Schweiz. Zentralstelle für Frauenberufe. 1943.

=== Articles ===
- Bruno de Bessé (2002), "École de traduction et d'interprétation de l'Université de Genève", Traduire: Revue française de la traduction (in French), no. 192, pp. 53–67
- Louis Truffaut (1980), "L'École de traduction et d'interprétation de l'Université de Genève", Cahiers européens - Europäische Hefte - Notes from Europe (in French), no. 2, pp. 82–96
- Françoise Buffat (July 11, 1977), "Y a-t-il une crise à l'École de traduction et d'interprétation ?", Journal de Genève (in French)
- Varuna Singh (July 15, 1993), "Le diplôme de l'Ecole de traduction devient eurocompatible", Journal de Genève et Gazette de Lausanne (in French)
- Claudine Girod (August 26, 2004), "La "réforme" de l'École de traduction sème la discorde", Tribune de Genève (in French)
- Yvan Schulz (December 22, 2004), "L'ETI peine à faire passer ses réformes", Le Courrier (in French)
- Miguel Otera (February 28, 2005), "L'ETI veut faire la preuve par dix de l'efficacité de ses réformes", Le Courrier (in French)
- Moussadek, Marion (May 4, 2007), "À l'ère digitale, le métier d'interprète de conférence amorce sa mutation", Le Temps (in French)
