= Éric Werner =

Swiss philosopher, journalist and essayist (born 1940)

Éric Werner (born 1940) is a Swiss philosopher, journalist and essayist.

== Biography ==
He studied at the Institut d'Études Politiques de Paris. He is a retired professor of the University of Geneva.

== Works ==
- De la violence au totalitarisme, essai sur la pensée de Camus et de Sartre, Calmann-Lévy, Paris, 1972.
- Mystique et politique : études de philosophie politique, L'Âge d'Homme, Lausanne et Paris, 1979, ISBN 978-2-8251-3185-5.
- Jan Marejko and Éric Werner, De la misère intellectuelle et morale en Suisse romande [nouvelle édition, avec une postface d'Éric Werner], L'Âge d'Homme, Lausanne et Paris, 1981,
- Le système de trahison, L'Âge d'Homme, Lausanne et Paris, 1986, ISBN 978-2-8251-3186-2.
- Ne dites surtout pas que je doute, on finirait par le croire : à propos de l'« affaire Paschoud », Thaël, Lausanne, 1988,
- Vous avez dit guerre civile ?, Thaël, Lausanne, 1990,
- De l'extermination, Thaël, Lausanne, 1993,
- Montaigne stratège, L'Âge d'Homme, Lausanne et Paris, 1996, ISBN 2-8251-0730-1.
- L'Avant-guerre civile, L'Âge d'Homme, Lausanne et Paris, 1999, ISBN 2-8251-1196-1.
- L'Après-démocratie, L'Âge d'Homme, Lausanne et Paris, 2001, ISBN 2-8251-1484-7.
- La Maison de servitude : Réplique au Grand Inquisiteur, éditions Xenia, Vevey, 2006, ISBN 978-2-88892-009-0.
- Ne vous approchez pas des fenêtres : Indiscrétions sur la nature réelle du régime, Xénia, Vevey, 2008, ISBN 978-2-88892-052-6.
