= RERO =

RERO can stand for:

- RERO, a library network of western Switzerland
- Release early, release often, a software development philosophy
