= Francis Marchal =

Swiss surgeon (born 1964)

- Born: September 10, 1964 (age 61); Switzerland
- Education: University of Geneva
- Known for: Development of Sialendoscopy and facial plastic surgery techniques
- Awards: Eugene Nicholas Myers Lecture, Franz Escher Medal of Honor
- Scientific career
- Fields: Otorhinolaryngology, Head and Neck Surgery, Facial Plastic Surgery
- Workplaces: University of Geneva, Geneva University Hospitals (HUG)

Francis Marchal (born September 10, 1964) is a Swiss surgeon, fellow of the American College of Surgeons, specialized in head and neck surgery and facial plastic surgery. He is a professor of Otorhinolaryngology Head and Neck Surgery (ORL-HNS) at the University of Geneva, Switzerland, and is responsible for the salivary gland unit at the Geneva University Hospitals (HUG). He is known for his contributions to the treatment of salivary gland diseases, particularly in the development of facial plastic and reconstructive techniques in parotid surgery and in the development and popularization of Sialendoscopy.

== Education ==
Marchal studied medicine at the University of Geneva, graduating in 1989. He worked in the emergency department under Kenneth Mattox at the Ben Taub General Hospital in Houston, Texas, where he completed his medical thesis on "Tracheo-esophageal penetrating wounds of the neck."

Initially specialized in cardiovascular surgery, he spent two years managing the heart transplant program at the University Hospitals of Geneva under Bernard Faidutti. He also visited Michael DeBakey at the Baylor College of Medicine and Methodist Hospital and Denton Cooley at the Texas Heart Institute.

Interested in facial plastic surgery and head and neck surgery, he trained in the ORL-HNS Department at the University Hospitals of Geneva under Pierre Montandon, in the ORL-HNS Department at the Inselspital under Rudolph Häusler and in the Maxillofacial Department under Joram Raveh. He obtained the German diploma of head and neck ultrasound in 1995.

In 1998, he was certified as a Head and Neck Surgeon by the University of Geneva and the Swiss Federation of Physicians (FMH). He also became a Facial Plastic and Reconstructive Surgeon certified by the University of Lyon, where he defended his thesis on "Nasal reconstruction with calvarial bone".

He obtained his Privat-docent title in 2003 at the University of Geneva, with a thesis on Sialendoscopy. In 2012, he was appointed Professor at the University of Geneva, where he currently leads the salivary gland unit at the Geneva University Hospitals (HUG), focusing on clinical practice, research, and teaching.

== Career and Accomplishments ==
In 1995, Marchal was sent by the Swiss Society for ENT-HNS to Germany to establish an ultrasound training program in Switzerland. In 1999, he organized the first Swiss head and neck ultrasound course, which, over a decade later, led to the official integration of head and neck ultrasound specialization into Swiss ENT training.

During his time in Germany, he observed external stone fragmentation using an extracorporeal lithotripter and the use of urologic baskets for blind stone removal in the salivary ducts at the University of Erlangen, under the guidance of its promoter, Prof. Heinrich Iro.

Upon returning to Geneva, Marchal worked with a prototype endoscope from the École Polytechnique Fédérale de Lausanne. After several trials, he collaborated with a German company to develop various types of endoscopes for exploring the salivary ducts, which have been used worldwide for 25 years. He designed and introduced specialized tools, including dedicated salivary baskets for stone retrieval, dilatation balloons, and reusable instruments, enabling minimally invasive access to the salivary ducts.

His early work, involving over 100 cases of parotid and submandibular Sialendoscopy gained international recognition, including a feature in the New England Journal of Medicine in 1999. He further published several reference papers on submandibular and parotid Sialendoscopy and started informing the ORL-HNS community through contributions to specialized books, including chapters in "Minimally Invasive Surgery of the Head and Neck and Cranial Base", "Salivary Gland Disorders", and the "Otolaryngology – Head and Neck Surgery" Textbooks.

In January 2002, he organized the first International Congress on Salivary Gland Diseases which garnered significant media attention. During this event, he also conducted the first international course on Sialendoscopy and developed an innovative training model using fresh pig heads.

He later founded the European Sialendoscopy Training Center in Geneva (ESTC), where over 1,700 physicians from 58 countries visited over 24 years, participating in 32 international courses.

In 2005, he successfully realized his January 2002 project by establishing a multidisciplinary salivary society, the European Salivary Gland Society (ESGS)., which later became one of the founding organizations of the European Academy of ORL-HNS eventually evolving into the European Confederation of ORL-HNS. In 2017, ESGS was renamed the Multidisciplinary Salivary Gland Society (MSGS). Marchal served as general secretary of ESGS for 12 years and as president of MSGS for 8 years organizing numerous international meetings, the most recent of which was held in Hong Kong, led by Dr. Siu Kwan Ng in 2024.

In 2007, Marchal, in collaboration with the University of Pittsburgh, organized the second European Salivary Gland Society Conference and the first American Sialendoscopy hands-on course, which helped raise awareness among American ENT-HNS specialists.

Marchal has traveled extensively around the world to conduct over 200 lectures and live surgery courses, which have occasionally received media coverage. His work has taken him to India, Asia, Oceania, the Middle East, and Europe, contributing to the global development of sialendoscopy.

In 2012, with the growing global interest in sialendoscopy, Marchal organized the second international sialendoscopy conference. He proposed to his colleagues the creation of the International Sialendoscopy Society (ISIAL), which continues to organize meetings worldwide. Since its inception, he has served as ISIAL's founder, CEO, and president. During its most recent meeting in September 2023, he successfully unified all groups involved in sialendoscopy under the umbrella of ISIAL.

ISIAL was appointed by the International Federation of ORL Societies (IFHNOS – Prof. Jatin Shah), the American Academy of Otolaryngology–Head and Neck Surgery (AAOHNS – Prof. Boyd Gillespie), the American Head and Neck Society (AHNS – Prof. Robert Ferris), and the Multidisciplinary Salivary Gland Society (MSGS) to develop an international curriculum for sialendoscopy that would be recognized worldwide.

== Contributions to Facial Plastic Surgery ==
In addition to his work on salivary gland diseases, Marchal has been actively involved in facial plastic, reconstructive, and cosmetic surgery since 1997. He became a member of the American Academy of Facial Plastic and Reconstructive Surgery in 1997 and joined the French Society for Plastic Surgery in 1998. In 1999, he founded the Facial Plastic Surgery Group of the Swiss Society of ORL-HNS.

== Awards and Recognitions ==
For his global contributions to salivary gland diseases, Marchal received the Eugene Nicholas Myers Lecture Award, an honor given annually to one international specialist for lifetime achievements in head and neck surgery.

He also received the Franz Escher Medal of Honor from the Swiss Society of ORL-HNS and was named an honorary member of several national ORL-HNS societies.

In 2025, Marchal launched the Salivary Foundation, aiming to support the development, research, and training of minimally invasive endoscopic techniques worldwide.

== Publications, memberships and editorial work ==
Marchal has authored numerous scientific papers, book chapters and books, including the 2005 "Sialendoscopy: The Endoscopic Approach to Salivary Gland Ductal Pathologies" which describes the history of sialendoscopy and sialendoscopes, the instruments and the technique. In 2015, under the direction of Marchal, 154 experts from 40 countries across all continents wrote the reference book on Sialendoscopy, "Sialendoscopy: The Hands-on Book," which serves as a guide to the technique.

Marchal has served on multiple editorial boards of several international ORL-HNS journals for over 20 years and is currently Senior Deputy Editor of the Facial Plastic Surgery Journal.

His research covers various aspects of sialendoscopy, including its interactions with radiology, immunology, pediatrics, thyroid surgery, and nuclear medicine. This has fostered increased interest in multidisciplinary collaboration and has enhanced visibility in the field of salivary disorders. according to Scopus, his publications have been cited more than 3'100 times.

== Community activity ==
Marchal has been serving as the Swiss representative for the European Union of Medical Specialist (ORL-HNS group) for 25 years, where he successfully advocated for the inclusion of sialendoscopy in the European logbook, the adoption of the European Board Exam (EBE) in Otorhinolaryngology – Head and Neck Surgery and the introduction of the facial plastic surgery curriculum in the head and neck surgery program.

He served for 15 years on the Board of Directors of the Clinique Générale Beaulieu and for 20 years on the Board of the Société Médicale Beaulieu (SMB) Foundation, where he also held the position of President.
