= Samuel Baud-Bovy =

Swiss musician

- Born: 2 November 1906; Geneva, Switzerland
- Died: 27 November 1986 (aged 80); Geneva, Switzerland
- Occupations: Musician, ethnomusicologist, college professor

Samuel Baud-Bovy (27 November 1906 – 2 November 1986) was a Swiss musician, ethnomusicologist, and college professor.

Baud-Bovy was director of the Geneva Conservatory of Music and a professor of Greek at the University of Geneva. He collected folk songs in the Dodecanese Islands in the 1930s, for his doctoral research. French linguist Hubert Pernot was his mentor. After World War II he made several music collecting tours in Crete. He was a member of the International Folk Music Council from 1948, and served on the group's executive council from 1977 to 1981.

== Publications ==
- "La systématisation des chansons populaires" (1965)
- "L'accord de la lyre antique et la musique populaire de la Grèce moderne" (1967)
- "Chansons D'epire Du Nord Et Du Pont" (1971)
- "Le dorien était-il un mode pentatonique?" (1978)
- "Bourgault-Ducoudray et la musique grecque ecclésiastique et profane" (1982)
- "Le 'genre enharmonique' a-t-il existé?" (1986)
- "Métrique Antique et Chanson Populaire" (1987)

== Legacy ==
Baud-Bovy's ethnographic papers and field recordings, archived in the Musée d'ethnographie de Genève, document his research on the music of Crete. His papers on classical music are at the Geneva Conservatory of Music, and his papers on Greek literature are with the Modern Greek department at the University of Geneva. In 2016, Bertrand Bouvier and Anastasia Danae Lazaridis edited a collection of essays titled Samuel Baud-Bovy (1906–1986): Néohelléniste, ethnomusicologue, musicien. His sound recordings were chosen for preservation and digitization by the United Music Foundation in 2019.
