= François Naef =

Swiss pastor and writer (1825-1897)

- Born: Eugène-François-Bernard Naef; March 31, 1825; Geneva, Switzerland
- Died: November 4, 1897 (aged 72); Geneva, Switzerland
- Education: University of Geneva
- Occupations: Pastor, historian, literary critic, translator
- Spouse: Antoinette-Etiennette-Françoise Barral (m. 1853)
- Children: 3 (2 survived to adulthood)
- Parent(s): Bernard Naef; Jeanne-Antoinette Benoît

François Naef (31 March 1825 – 4 November 1897) was a Swiss Protestant pastor, church historian, literary critic and translator. Born Eugène-François-Bernard Naef in Geneva, he served various parishes in the Canton of Vaud and Canton of Geneva, while also pursuing scholarly work in ecclesiastical history and literature.

== Early life and education ==
François Naef was the son of Bernard Naef, an engraver and watch merchant who served on the Representative Council of Geneva, and Jeanne-Antoinette née Benoît. After completing primary school in Geneva, he attended the Commercial and Industrial School from 1833, then the collège from 1838. He also took drawing lessons with Auguste Calame.

From 1842, Naef studied at the Academy of Geneva, where he was notably a student of Rodolphe Töpffer. The same year, he joined the Société de Belles-Lettres, which he presided over in 1844, and later joined the Zofingue Society. He worked as a tutor in 1843 but declined a similar position in Odessa, and received his bachelor of arts degree in 1844. At the academy, he attended courses by Alphonse de Candolle and Ernest Naville.

== Theological studies and pastoral career ==
Starting in 1846, Naef studied theology. He was consecrated in 1850 and became a member of the Permanent Commission for Religious and Theological Literature of the Company of Pastors. In 1851, he was appointed to the ministry of Poliez-le-Grand and declined a chair of theology at the Academy of Lausanne. He left Poliez-le-Grand in 1860 to become chaplain of Geneva's primary schools.

During the 1860s, Naef preached in several parishes in the city of Geneva and in Carouge. In 1864, he succeeded the pastor of Begnins, where he chaired the school commission, then served as pastor in Céligny from 1867 to 1886. He also served as vice-president (1877, 1882) and president (1878) of the Company of Pastors of Geneva. Naef spent his retirement years in Le Grand-Saconnex from 1886 to 1897.

== Literary and scholarly work ==
During his school and university years, Naef won several prizes for his work. He founded the school journal L'Echappé de Collège. The pastor of Dommartin, François Milliquet, introduced him to the works of Albert Bitzius (Jeremias Gotthelf), whose story Der Sonntag des Grossvaters Naef translated into French, published in 1853 as Le dimanche du grand-père.

Naef was the author of works on ecclesiastical history, including Histoire de la Réformation (History of the Reformation), published in 1856 and republished in 1866. Between 1864 and 1866, he wrote numerous reviews for the Bibliothèque universelle, and from 1874 to 1893, published contributions in the Etrennes religieuses, a journal of liberal pastors. From 1881 until his death, he also collaborated with La Lecture (part of the Bibliothèques populaires) and the Petite bibliothèque helvétique. Naef also wrote Souvenirs d'un sexagénaire (Memoirs of a Sexagenarian) (1888–1890), four volumes of memoirs that were never published.

== Personal life ==
In 1853, Naef married Antoinette-Etiennette-Françoise Barral, with whom he had three children, two of whom survived to adulthood.

== Works ==
- Le dimanche du grand-père (1853) - French translation of Jeremias Gotthelf's Der Sonntag des Grossvaters
- Histoire de la Réformation (1856, republished 1866)
- Les premiers jours du christianisme en Suisse (1879)
- Souvenirs d'un sexagénaire (1888–1890) - unpublished memoirs in four volumes
- Histoire de l'église chrétienne (1892)

== Bibliography ==
- Naef, Henri: La famille Naef et le lignage de Gattikon en Suisse Romande, 1932, especially pp. 197–226.
- Hunziker, Rudolf; Bloesch, Hans et al. (ed., in collaboration with the Bitzius family and with the support of the canton of Bern): Sämtliche Werke in 24 Bänden / Jeremias Gotthelf, supplementary volume 9: Briefe von 1853-1854, 1954, no 33, pp. 54, 247.
- Stelling-Michaud, Suzanne (ed.): Le Livre du Recteur de l'Académie de Genève (1559-1878), vol. 5, 1976, pp. 1–2.
- Derron, Marianne: "Vos ouvrages, Monsieur, sont ce qu'il [...] faut". Wie die Romandie Jeremias Gotthelf entdeckte", in: Derron, Marianne; Zimmermann, Christian von (ed.): Jeremias Gotthelf. Neue Studien, 2014, pp. 53–74, especially 68–69.
