= Kaweh Mansouri =

Iranian-Austrian ophthalmologist

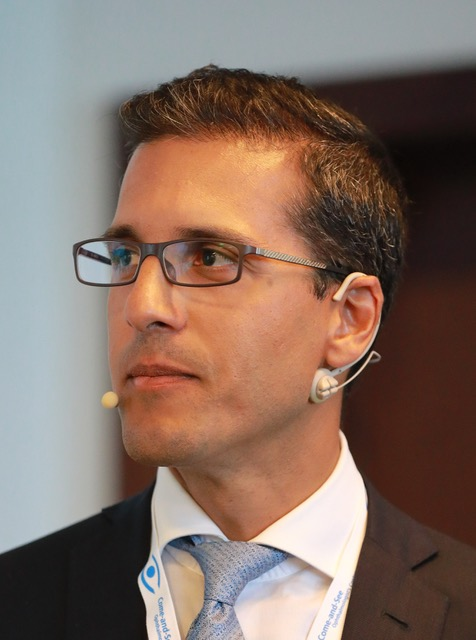
Kaweh Mansouri in 2018

Kaweh Mansouri is an Iranian-Austrian ophthalmologist and researcher in glaucoma. He is an adjunct professor at the Department of Ophthalmology, University of Colorado School of Medicine and a consultant ophthalmologist at the Montchoisi Clinic, Lausanne. He serves as the Associate Executive Vice President of the World Glaucoma Association and is President of the Swiss Glaucoma Research Foundation.

== Education ==
Born and raised in Austria, Mansouri received his M.D. from the Medical University of Vienna in 2003, followed by residencies in ophthalmology at the University of Basel, the University of Geneva and the University of Lausanne, and a glaucoma fellowship at the Hamilton Glaucoma Center of the Shiley Eye Institute, UC San Diego Health. He also earned a Masters in Public Health (2008) from the University of Geneva.

== Career ==
Mansouri is an expert in the field of continuous intraocular pressure (IOP) monitoring. He pioneered the clinical development of the first smart contact lens for the continuous measurement of IOP (Sensimed Triggerfish, Switzerland), as well as the Eyemate intraocular sensor (Implandata AG, Germany). His other research activities include the development of new technologies in the field of glaucoma imaging and surgery.

He has co-authored over 400 peer-reviewed publications. He is on the editorial board of the "Journal of Glaucoma", an associate editor of "Acta Ophthalmologica", and is a contributing editor to the "International Glaucoma Review".

He is the Founder and President of the Swiss Glaucoma Research Foundation.
