= Yves Flückiger =

Swiss economist (b. 1955)

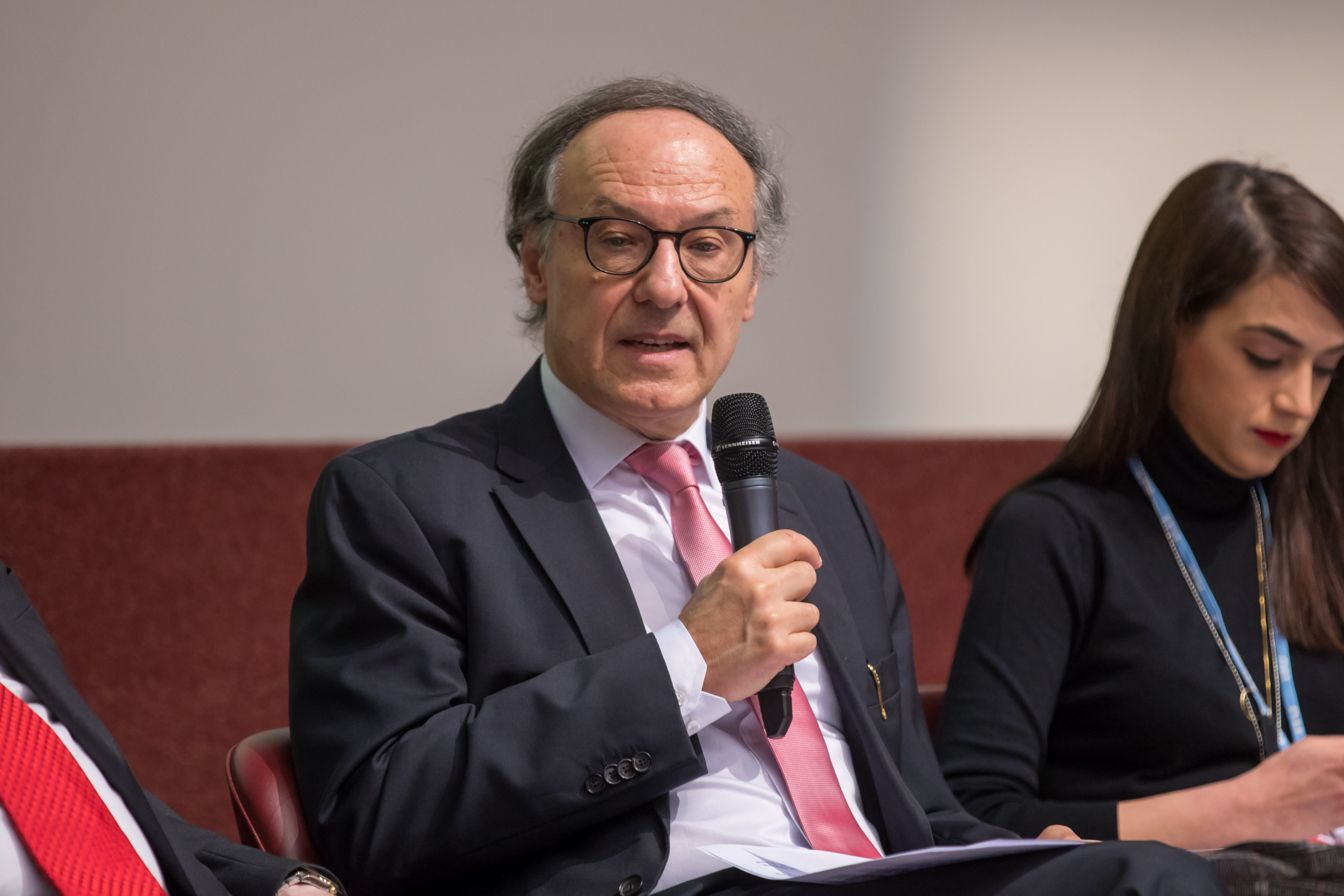
- Yves Flückiger speaking
- Occupation: Academic

Academic background
- Education: University of Geneva

Academic work
- Discipline: Economics
- Sub-discipline: labor economics, industrial organization, public finance
- Institutions: University of Geneva, swissuniversities, League of European Research Universities, Swiss Academies of Arts and Sciences

Yves Flückiger (born November 2, 1955) is a Swiss economist and former rector of the University of Geneva, where he served until 2024. His tenure included initiatives focused on research, digitalization, and international partnerships.

== Life and career ==
Flückiger studied Economics and Sociology at the University of Geneva, where he also earned a doctorate in Political Economy. He completed research fellowships at Harvard University and the University of Oxford.

Flückiger joined the University of Geneva in 1992 as a professor, focusing on labor economics, industrial organization, and public finance. He directed the University Employment Observatory and the Leading House for Education Economics, producing research on labor market dynamics, wage discrimination, and employment policies.

Flückiger became Rector of the University of Geneva in July 2015. In this role, he emphasized research expansion and international collaboration. He supported the digitalization of education and introduced sustainability initiatives aligned with the United Nations Sustainable Development Goals. During the COVID-19 pandemic, he implemented measures for remote learning and health protocols.

From 2020 to 2023, Flückiger served as President of swissuniversities, the umbrella organization for Swiss higher education institutions, advocating for Swiss academic cooperation at both the national and international levels. In 2022, he was elected Chair of the League of European Research Universities (LERU), a role in which he represented Swiss universities within European research networks.

In January 2024, Flückiger became President of the Swiss Academies of Arts and Sciences, an organization that promotes relations between science and society in Switzerland.
