= Language management =

Language management is a discipline that consists of satisfying the needs of people who speak multiple different languages. These may be in the same country, in companies, and in cultural or international institutions where one must use multiple languages.

== Cultural Diversity and Multilingualism ==
There are currently about 6000 languages in the world, 85 of which are protected by sovereign states. The universal declaration of UNESCO on cultural diversity in 2001 recalls the richness of global cultural heritage, which comes from its cultural diversity: "This intangible cultural heritage, passed down from generation to generation, is constantly recreated by communities and groups according to their environment, their interaction with nature, and their history, and brings a feeling of identity and of continuity, thus contributing to the promotion of respect of cultural diversity and human creativity." The declaration of Montreal in 2007 repeated this concern. UNESCO organized a conference on "Multilingualism for Cultural Diversity and Participation of All in Cyberspace" in Bamako, Mali, on May 6 and 7, 2005, in partnership with the African Academy of Languages (ACALAN) the Organisation internationale de la Francophonie (OIF), and the Government of Mali, as well as other international organizations. UNESCO is otherwise responsible for the introduction of the concept of intangible cultural heritage, which manages the cultural heritage in terms of its information support.

For example, text and images associated with the Louvre museum in France are part of the intangible cultural heritage, and it goes without saying that the diversity of the visitors requires the management of text in several languages. This meeting aimed to prepare the second phase of the World Summit of the Society of Information (held in Tunis, Tunisia, 16 to 18 of November 2005). The other part, the phenomenon of globalization produces exchanges which requires the management of different languages at the nodes of interconnection (airports, parking lots, ...). The Internet, finally, produces commercial exchanges indifferent to linguistic frontiers, and virtual communities, like Wikipedia, are where the participants speaking different languages can dialog and exchange information and knowledge.

== Language Policy ==
International institutions, governments, and firms are faced with language management needs.

=== International institutions ===
In international institutions, languages can have different statutes: Official language or work language.

=== European Union States ===
Plenty of states have multiple official languages in their territory. This is the case in:

- Belgium (Dutch, French, German)
- Switzerland (German, French, Italian, Romansch)
- Canada (French and English)
- in numerous African countries, and
- in Luxembourg (French, German, Luxembourgish).

In France, where many regional languages exist, especially in the regions on the border (cross-border languages) and in Brittany (Breton) none of them have official status. Therefore, a certain number of states have put linguistic policies in place. On a larger scale, the European Union has also defined a linguistic policy, which distinguishes 23 official languages.

=== Impact on School ===
Upon entrance to school, children of diverse cultures are forced to abandon their cultural roots and their mother tongues, to the benefit of the normative language chosen by the school. Research has shown that school, by acting to transmit a country's norms, contributes to the destruction of diversity, can even create in certain children a rejection of their mother language that is shown to be the cause of their learning difficulties.

== Businesses ==
Many international enterprises are bringing about, in a strategic move toward internationalization, changing the language of work in all or part of their activities. In an immense majority of cases, the chosen language is English called the 'lingua franca" or vehicular language. The language of home (mother tongue) is keeping a definite importance in the direction of this lingua franca. A great number of documents are coming to be published in English. which can become official language in certain meetings, teleconferences, or video conferences.

This poses obvious questions of language management. How are workers educated in a new language for work in the case that English is not an official language of the country where they find themselves assigned? What is the pertinence of imposing a foreign language on workers in a company, in the measure of usage of this language as part of their competence and effect on their productivity. What is the economic equation to resolve between, on one had, the benefits (which may be more important) teased away for the internationalization and the ill-effects of this internationalization plus the level playing field of language, and unforeseen ill-effects which may well be present and the potentially high costs: cost of inefficiency, cost of translation, and cost of professional education.

Language management in organizations has been found to have instrumental consequences as well as identity related consequences (Lauring, 2008). Instrumental benefits from language management and the use of a common organizational language could be related to easier access to documents and a generally better communication flow in the organization. However, the use of a common language can also provide a positive indication of inclusion to linguistic minorities. Thereby language management can help to reduce language based feeling of us versus them between different language communities. Some studies have also found negative consequences of using a common language (Marschan-Piekkari, Welch, & Welch, 1999). For example, using a common language may distort the normal power structure of an organization (Neeley, 2013). It has been theorized that speaking in a second language can be highly demanding for organization members cause strain on the individual (Volk, Köhler, & Pudelko, 2014). Language management has been found to work differently in face-to-face settings compared to virtual teams (Klitmøller & Lauring, 2013).

== See also ==
- Globalization
- Multiculturalism
- Multicultural education
