= Éditions L'Âge d'Homme =

Publisher in Lausanne, Switzerland

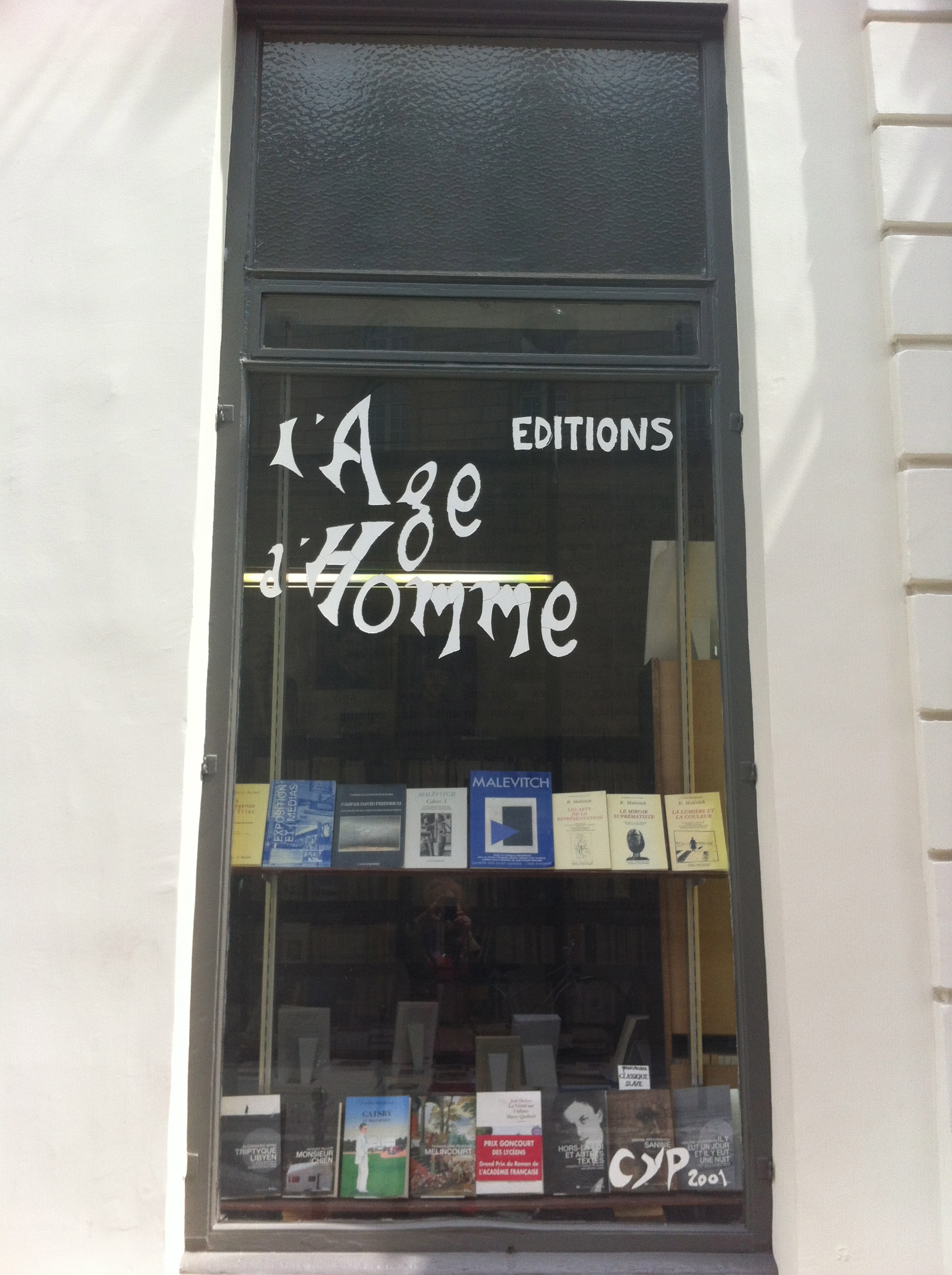
Éditions L'Âge d'Homme's store in Paris in 2013

Éditions L'Âge d'Homme is a publishing company founded in Lausanne in 1966 by Vladimir Dimitrijević.

== History ==
The company first became known for its French-language editions of Slavic-language literature but soon diversified its publishing line, which includes journals, academic literature and fiction. Until the fall of the Soviet Union, it was a major French-language publisher of literature by Soviet dissident writers such as Alexander Zinoviev. It published several prominent Swiss and French authors. By 2011, the year of Dimitrijević's death, it had published approximately 4500 titles.

The publishing house has also been involved in the defense of poets such as Lucien Noullez, Ferenc Rákóczy, Monique Laederach and Pierrette Micheloud.

Until 2016, L'Âge d'Homme operated its own bookstore in the 6th arrondissement of Paris.

Due to the refocus to French and Swiss titles, many of the Slavic classics from its catalogue became unavailable. In 2018, an agreement was made with the publishing company Noir sur Blanc to take over the publication of this part of L'Âge d'Homme's back catalogue.
