= Pierre-André Flückiger =

Swiss sports shooter (1919–1994)

Personal information
- Born: 18 May 1919 La Chaux-de-Fonds, Switzerland
- Died: 1994 (aged 74–75)

Sport
- Sport: Sports shooting

Pierre-André Flückiger (18 May 1919 – 1994) was a Swiss sports shooter. He competed at the 1952 Summer Olympics and 1960 Summer Olympics.
