= Library Network of Western Switzerland =

Library in Switzerland

The Library Network of Western Switzerland (French: Réseau des bibliothèques de Suisse occidentale; RERO) was founded by several major libraries in 1985, in the French-speaking region of Romandy in western Switzerland. RERO is a syllabic abbreviation of "Réseau Romand" ("Romand Network").

Until 2020, RERO used to include most of the cantonal, academic, public, and specialized libraries in Switzerland, including academic libraries in Western Switzerland, such as those in Geneva, Fribourg, and Neuchâtel. In 2020, however, two-thirds of the institutions taking part to RERO moved to the competing network Swisscovery, which spans all of Switzerland and includes the majority of its academic institutions.
