= University of Geneva =

Public university in Geneva, Switzerland

- Université de Genève
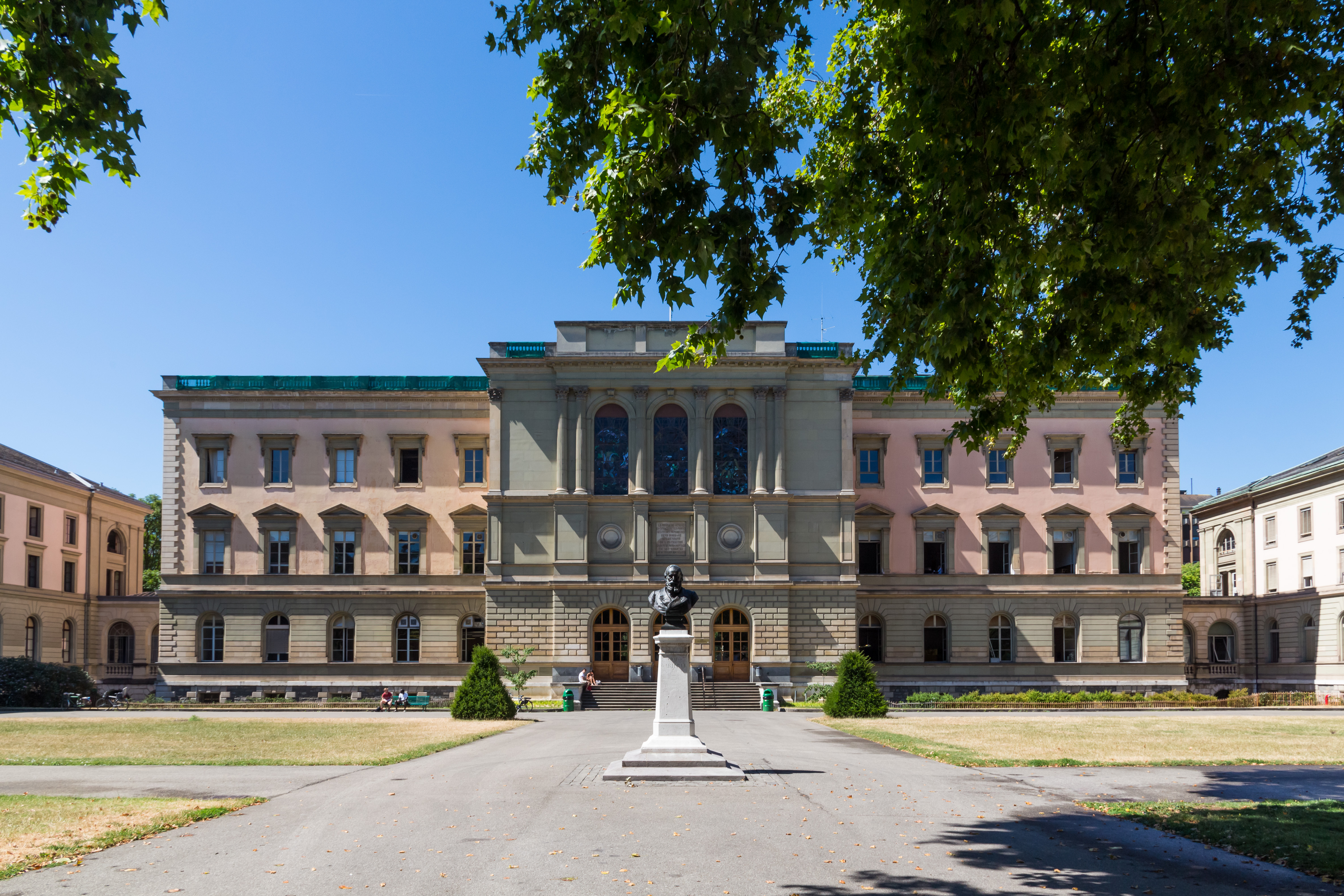
- Latin: Schola Genevensis
- Motto: Post tenebras lux (Latin)
- Motto in English: Light after darkness
- Type: Public university
- Established: 1559; 467 years ago
- Affiliations: 4EU+ Alliance; Coimbra Group; LERU; EUA; IFPU
- Rector: Audrey Leuba
- Administrative staff: approx. 6,500
- Students: 17,271
- Location: Geneva, Switzerland; 46°11′57″N 6°8′42″E
- Campus: Urban
- Language: French; English
- Website: www.unige.ch

The University of Geneva (French: Université de Genève) is a public research university located in Geneva, Switzerland. It was founded in 1559 by French theologian John Calvin as a theological seminary. It remained focused on theology until the 17th century, when it became a center for enlightenment scholarship. Today, it is the third largest university in Switzerland by number of students.

In 1873, it dropped its religious affiliations and became officially secular. In 2009, the University of Geneva celebrated the 450th anniversary of its founding. Almost 40% of the students come from over 150 foreign countries.

The university holds and actively pursues teaching, research, and community service as its primary objectives. The University of Geneva is a member of the League of European Research Universities, 4EU+ Alliance, Coimbra Group, International Forum of Public Universities, and European University Association. It is also home to numerous research centers and institutes, including the Global Studies Institute, and the Institute of Global Health.

== History ==
The university was founded in 1559 as the Academy of Geneva (Académie de Genève) by French theologian John Calvin, as a seminary administered by the Company of Pastors, to be the center of public education in Protestant Geneva. With the goal of educating not only pastors but also magistrates for the republic, in 1565 the academy began the teaching of Law.

During the French annexation of Geneva (1798–1813), the school was reorganized into a more universal format, with the introduction of degrees and its division in faculties. This process of modernization continued into the period of national Restoration.

In 1964, Sophie Kanza became the first Congolese woman to graduate from a university when she received her diploma from the University of Geneva with a degree in sociology.

== Location ==
The University of Geneva is located in several districts in the eastern part of the city and in the nearby city of Carouge (on the left bank of the Lake Léman and the Rhône), and the different buildings are sometimes very distant from each other (the Battelle buildings are for instance more than three kilometers away from the Bastions). The oldest building (1559) is the Collège Calvin, and is no longer a university building. Lectures are given in six different main locations, Les Bastions, Uni Dufour, Sciences I, II and III, Uni Mail and Uni Pignon, Centre Médical Universitaire (CMU), and Battelle; as well as in several other locations.

=== Uni Bastions ===
Built between 1868 and 1871, Uni Bastions is the symbol of Geneva's academic life. It is located in the middle of a park and is host to the faculty of Protestant Theology and to the Faculty of Arts.

=== Uni Dufour ===
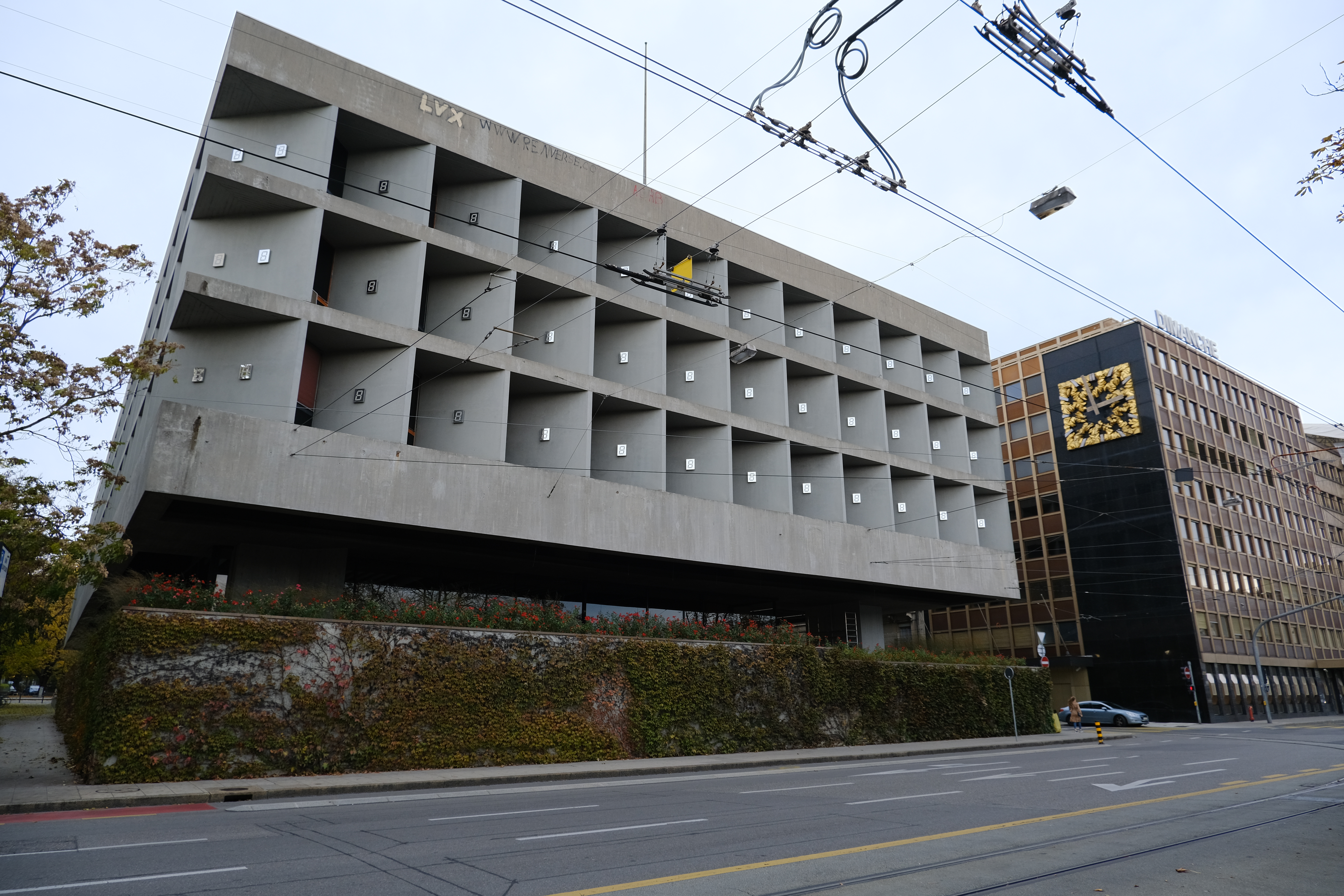
Uni Dufour

Its architecture was inspired by Le Corbusier. It hosts the Rectorat and the administration of the university.

=== Uni Mail ===
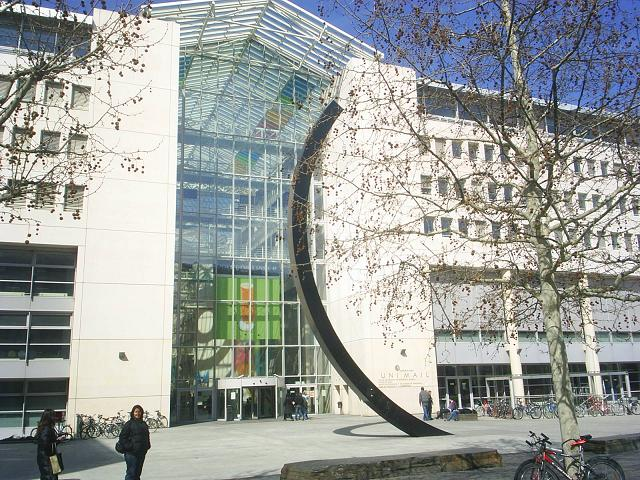
Uni Mail

It is Switzerland's biggest building dedicated to social sciences. It currently hosts the Faculty of Law, of Economics and Management, of Psychology and Education and the Faculty of Translation and Interpreting.

=== Centre Medical Universitaire ===
Home to the Faculty of Medicine as well as the departments of fundamental and clinical medical research, it is situated in the neighborhood of La Cluse, opposite to of the Hôpitaux Universitaires de Geneve (HUG) (Geneva University Hospitals). The construction of this large-scale medical and academic complex was started in 1970, halted in 1989 and the 6th phase of the project was finished in 2017, and it is now composed of 5 underground levels and 12 above-ground levels. The building now houses the École romande de pharmacie, the Clinique Universitaire de Medecine Dentaire (CUMD) numerous laboratories, facilities for clinical development and research, inter-faculty workspaces, an animal facility and a medical simulation centre. In addition, it also contains a daycare center, several lecture theatres, a cafeteria, communal areas, individual and shared office spaces necessary to house technical equipment, provide storage, and accommodate parking.

== Organisation ==
The University of Geneva is structured in various faculties and interfaculty centers which are representing teaching, research and service to society in the various disciplines.

=== Faculties ===
The university is composed of nine faculties:

- Faculty of Sciences
- Faculty of Medicine
- Faculty of Humanities
- Geneva School of Economics and Management (GSEM)
- Geneva School of Social Sciences (G3S)
- Geneva Law School
- Faculty of Theology
- Faculty of Psychology and Education
- Faculty of Translation and Interpreting

==== Interfaculty centers ====
The university is composed of fourteen interfacultary centers. Amongst others:

- Institute for Reformation History (Reformation)
- Interfaculty Center for Informatics (computer science)
- Institute for Environmental Sciences (energy policy)
- The Global Studies Institute
- Interfaculty Center of Gerontology (gerontology)
- Swiss Center for Affective Sciences (affective science)

==== Associated institutions ====
The university has also several partnerships with the nearby institutions, where students at the university may take courses.

- Bossey Ecumenical Institute of the World Council of Churches
- Wyss Center for Bio- and Neuro-engineering
- Swiss National Supercomputing Centre
- Art-Law Centre
- Center for Biomedical Imaging (CIBM)
- University Centre of Legal Medicine (CURML)
- The Institute for Work and Health (IST)

The Graduate Institute of International and Development Studies (IHEID) was administratively associated with the University of Geneva from 1927 to 2009.

=== Finances ===
The University of Geneva had a budget of roughly 760 million CHF for the year 2016. It mostly comes from the cantonal subventions, the other notable contributors being the federal state and the tuition fees.

=== Awards ===
Nessim-Habif World Prize given since 1963, granted to academics "who illustrate, through particularly original and in-depth thinking and work, a field of exact, medical or human sciences", by the Faculty of Sciences, during its Dies academicus ceremony, in Geneva.

== Libraries and press ==
=== Libraries ===
UNIGE's library facilities are spread across four sites.

- Uni Arve is host to seven libraries: Bibliothèque Ernst & Lucie Schmidheiny, Bibliothèque d'Anthropologie, Bibliothèque du Centre universitaire d'informatique, Bibliothèque Georges de Rham (Mathematics), Bibliothèque de l'Institut des Sciences de l'environnement (ISE), Bibliothèque de l'Observatoire (Astronomy) and the Bibliothèque des Sciences de la Terre et de l'environnement.
- Uni Bastions hosts the language libraries, as well as the university's libraries focused on history and musicology.
- Uni CMU is home to an extensive collection of medical issues. Besides, it is also hosts the Centre de documentation en santé (CDS) and the Bibliothèque de l'nstitut de la médecine et de la santé et de l'Institut d'éthique biomédicale (IHMS – IEB).
- Uni Mail's collection is focused on the following themes: Economics and social sciences, Law, Psychology and Learning Sciences, Translation and Interpreting, European studies, French as a foreign language and Musicology. Besides, it also hosts UNIGE's multimedia library.

=== Press ===
The journal de l'UNIGE is released biweekly. Its purpose is to ease communication inside the university, to inform the students about the research being carried at UNIGE, to convey new opinions and to inform students and teachers of upcoming university events via l'Agenda.

Campus is released monthly with the objective to ease communication between the scientific community and the citizens and to be a "bridge between science and city".

== Academics ==
=== Admission and fees ===
To be enrolled in a bachelor programme, one must hold a Swiss maturity diploma or a secondary diploma considered by the University of Geneva to be equivalent. If the degree was not pursued in French, applicants must pass an eliminatory French language test at the beginning of September, which consists of an oral and a written comprehension test and of a piece of argumentative writing. Tuition fees are of CHF 500 per semester.

=== Academic year ===
UNIGE's academic year runs from mid-September to mid-June. It is divided in two semesters, each one being concluded by an examination session, held respectively at the beginning of January and at the beginning of June. An examination session is held at the end of August and beginning of September as a retake for students who failed their January or June examinations.

During the three days before the start of the new academic year, the Journées d'accueil (Welcome Days) are organized by the university to introduce the new students to the city and the facilities, tips are also given on how to succeed at university. A second chapter including city tours, outdoor concerts and animations is also organized by the student association UniAccueil (AUA) to celebrate the new academic year.

=== Teaching and degrees ===
Before 2005, the university applied various very different models, depending on Faculties, and sometimes even on Departments (or "Sections"). Some Faculties applied the French education model of granting academic degrees, with some minor differences: demi-licence (two years), trois-quarts de licence (three years), licence (four years), diplôme d'études approfondies and diplôme d'études superieures spécialisées (DEA/DESS) (one–two years), and doctorate (three–five years).

The university now follows the requirements of the Bologna process: bachelor's (three years), master's (one–two years), in some departments or sections Master of Advanced Studies (one–two years), doctorate (three–five years).

UNIGE offers more than 240 types of diplomas: about 30 bachelor's degrees, 70 masters and 78 doctorates. It also provides more than 200 programmes of continuing education in various sectors.

=== International partnerships ===
Students at UNIGE have the possibility to study abroad for a semester or a year during their degree. Partner universities include Free University of Berlin, Harvard Law School, École Normale Supérieure, Trinity College Dublin, Erasmus University of Rotterdam, Université Libre de Bruxelles, King's College London, McGill University, HEC Montreal, University of Ottawa, University of Oxford, Uppsala University, Johns Hopkins University, University of Michigan, UCLA, University of Southampton, University of Sydney, University of Tokyo.

=== Research ===
The key sectors of research at the University of Geneva are sciences (molecular biology, bio-informatics, etc.), elementary physics, astrophysics, economics, social sciences, psychology, chemistry, biochemistry and biophysics.

UNIGE is home to six national research centers: in genetics (Frontiers in Genetics), in material sciences (MaNEP), in study of emotions (Affective Sciences), in chemical biology (with EPFL), in study of mental illness (Synaptic, with EPFL and Unil), in study of life path (with Unil). UNIGE also carries research in international studies since the creation in 2013 of the Global Studies Institute, in finance with the Geneva Finance Research Institute, and in environmental studies, with the creation in 2009 of the Institut des sciences de l'environnement.

Famous discoveries have been made by researcher working at UNIGE including the discoveries of extrasolar planets by Michel Mayor, and of quantum teleportation by Nicolas Gisin.

=== Rankings ===
University rankings

Global – Overall
- ARWU World: 58 (2024)
- CWUR World: 111 (2024)
- QS World: =155 (2026)
- THE World: 183 (2024)
- USNWR Global: 119 (2024)

The University of Geneva is consistently ranked one of the top universities in the world.

==== Global rankings ====
In 2023, the University of Geneva was ranked 49rd overall in the world according to the Shanghai Ranking. It was ranked 125th overall according to the QS ranking and 183rd overall according to the THE ranking. In 2006, Newsweek ranked the university 32nd in the world.

The QS World University Rankings ranked the University of Geneva as follows:

| Year | In the World |
|---|---|
| 2016 | 89th |
| 2015 | 85th |
| 2012 | 74th |
| 2011 | 69th |

The Times Higher Education World University Rankings ranked the University of Geneva as follows:

| Year | In the World |
|---|---|
| 2015–2016 | 131st |
| 2012–2013 | 133rd |
| 2011–2012 | 116th |
| 2010–2011 | 118th |

==== Subject rankings ====
In molecular biology, the impact of the research carried in Geneva was ranked 4th in Europe by Times Higher Education for the period 1999–2009, directly behind the University of Oxford.

In physics, the 2024 Shanghai ranking placed the University of Geneva at 3rd place in continental Europe and 15th place globally.

The QS 2013 subject ranking placed the University of Geneva at the 21st place in the field of Pharmacy and at the 49th place in Philosophy. In every subject, the university was ranked in the world's top 200.

==== Other rankings ====
In the 2013 QS ranking, the university was ranked 24th in the world for most international faculty and 20th in the world for most international student body. In 2023, it was ranked 26th best university overall in Europe.

== Student body ==
In 2016, 16,530 students were studying at UNIGE, of whom 61% were female. 37% of the students were non-Swiss, originating from 151 countries. 4,449 teachers and collaborators, of whom 49% are female, are working for UNIGE.

== Student life ==
=== Sports ===
The Bureau des sports organizes all the sports related activity at UNIGE. Free sports lessons are given every day and it suffices to show one's student card to access. Other lessons organization with the university's partners demand a small fee. UNIGE is home to the Geneva university championships in basketball, indoor football, rowing, badminton, outdoor football. The university also sends teams to the Swiss university championship in badminton, indoor football, skiing, basketball, fencing, football, golf, ice-hockey, table tennis and volleyball. UNIGE also provides special schedules for students wishing to pursue their high level sporting career and to study at the same time.

=== Associations ===
Alumni UNIGE is the alumni association of the University of Geneva, it offers a network of several thousand people to its members, as well as other advantages, such as discount prizes, special events, access to the official networking platform. Atout-lettres is the alumni association of the literature students of the university, founded in 1997. Its purpose is to prepare the professional insertion of the literature students, to establish links between literature student and the working world and to promote the formation given by the Faculté de Lettres.

== Alumni ==
Over the course of its history, a sizeable number of UNIGE alumni have become notable in their fields, both academic, and in the wider world. Affiliates of the University of Geneva have won 10 Nobel prizes. Graduate alumni (Martin Hairer and Vaughan Jones) have won 2 Fields Medals.

The university has hosted several Nobel laureates as students, researchers and/or professors: Norman Angell (1872–1967), Nobel Peace Prize 1933; Karl Gunnar Myrdal (1898–1987, IHEID) Nobel Prize in Economic Sciences 1974; Daniel Bovet (1907–1992), Nobel Prize in Medicine 1957; Niels Kaj Jerne (1911–1994), Nobel Prize in Medicine 1984; Maurice Allais (1911–2010, IHEID), Nobel Prize in Economic Sciences 1988; Edmond H. Fischer (1920–2021), Nobel Prize in Medicine 1992; Martin Rodbell (1925–1998), Nobel Prize in Medicine 1994; Alan Jay Heeger (born 1936), Nobel Prize in Chemistry 2000; Werner Arber (born 1929), Nobel Prize in Medicine 1978; Kofi Annan (1938–2018, IHEID), Nobel Peace Prize 2001; Michel Mayor (1942-- ) and Didier Queloz (1966-- ), Nobel Prize in Physics 2019 (jointly with James Peebles).

It has also hosted or graduated four Fields Medal laureates: Vaughan Jones (1952–2020), laureate in 1990, Stanislav Smirnov (born 1970), laureate in 2010, Martin Hairer (born 1975), laureate in 2014, and Hugo Duminil-Copin (born 1985), laureate in 2022.

Selected Nobel laureate affiliates of UNIGE

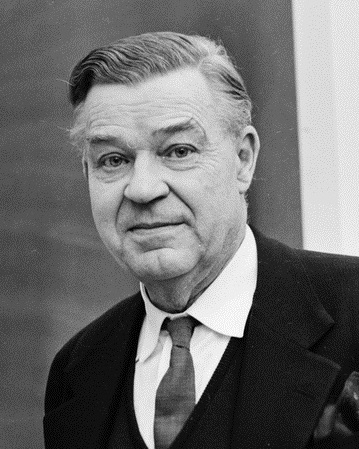
Karl Gunnar Myrdal, recipient of the 1974 Nobel Prize in Economic Sciences

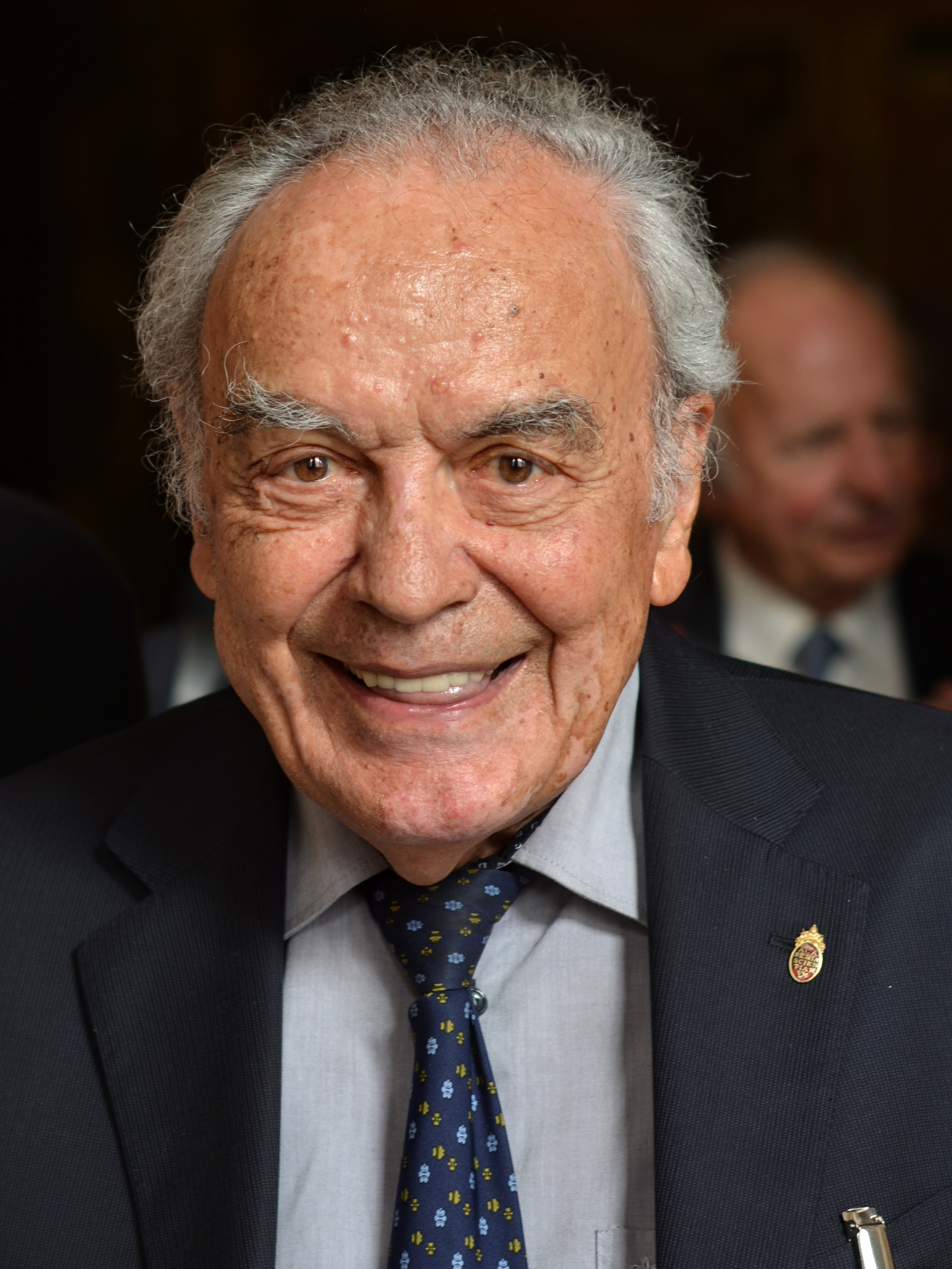
Werner Arber, recipient of the 1978 Nobel Prize in Physiology or Medicine

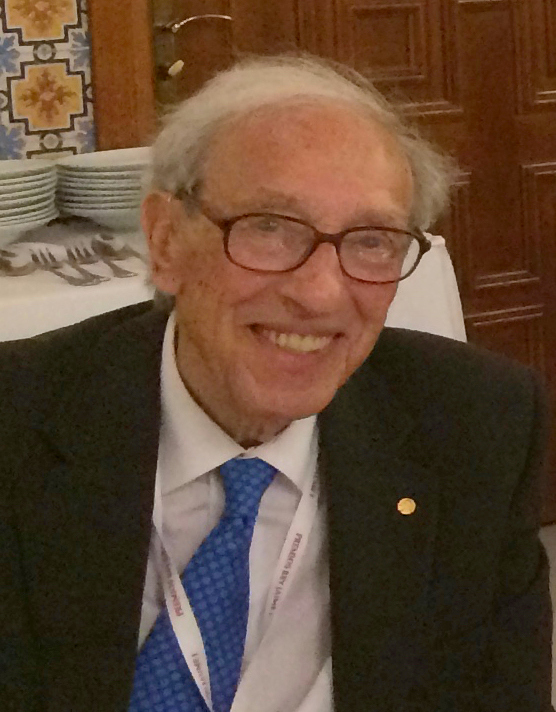
Edmond H. Fischer, recipient of the 1992 Nobel Prize in Physiology or Medicine

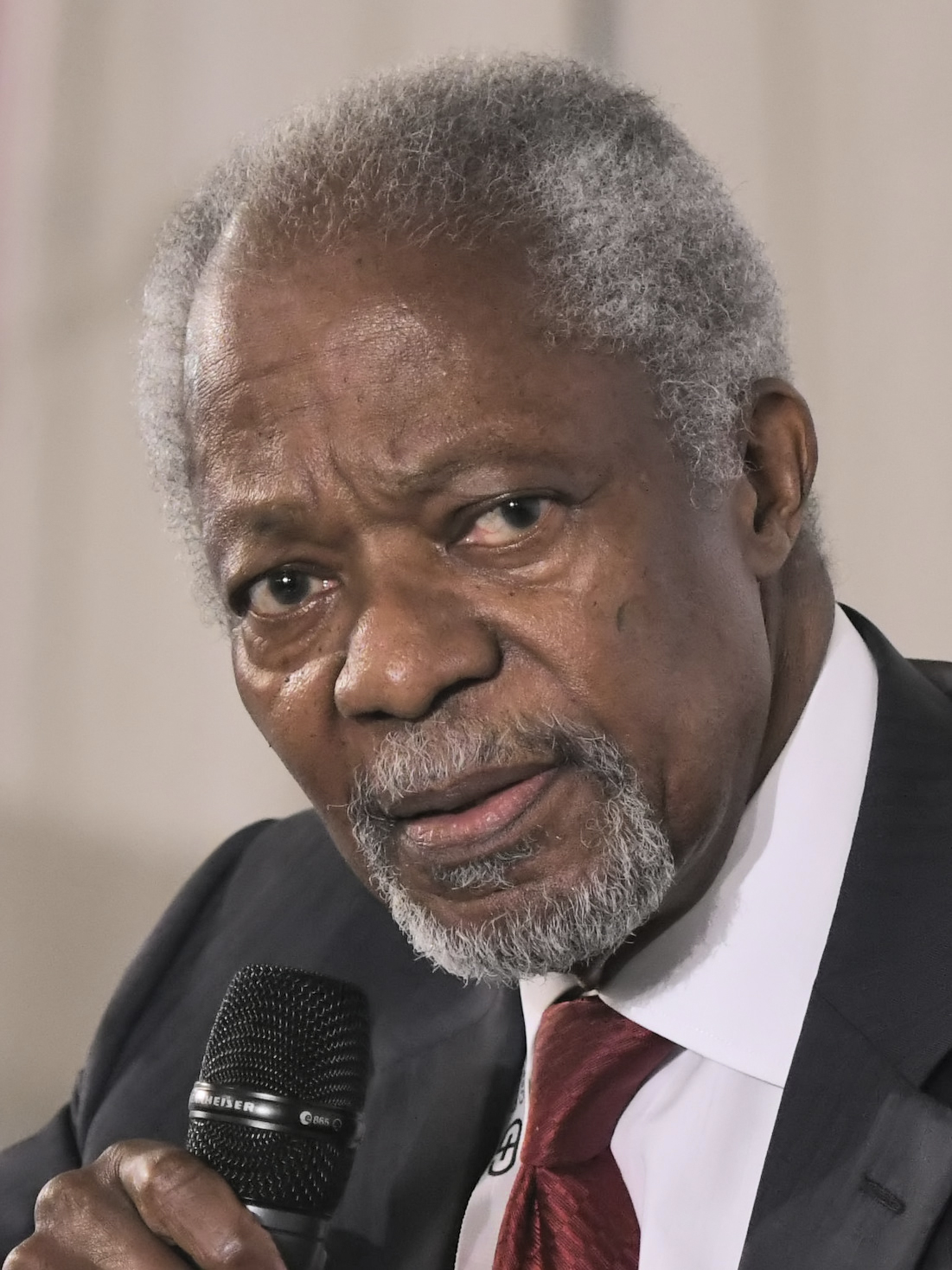
Kofi Annan, recipient of the 2001 Nobel Peace Prize

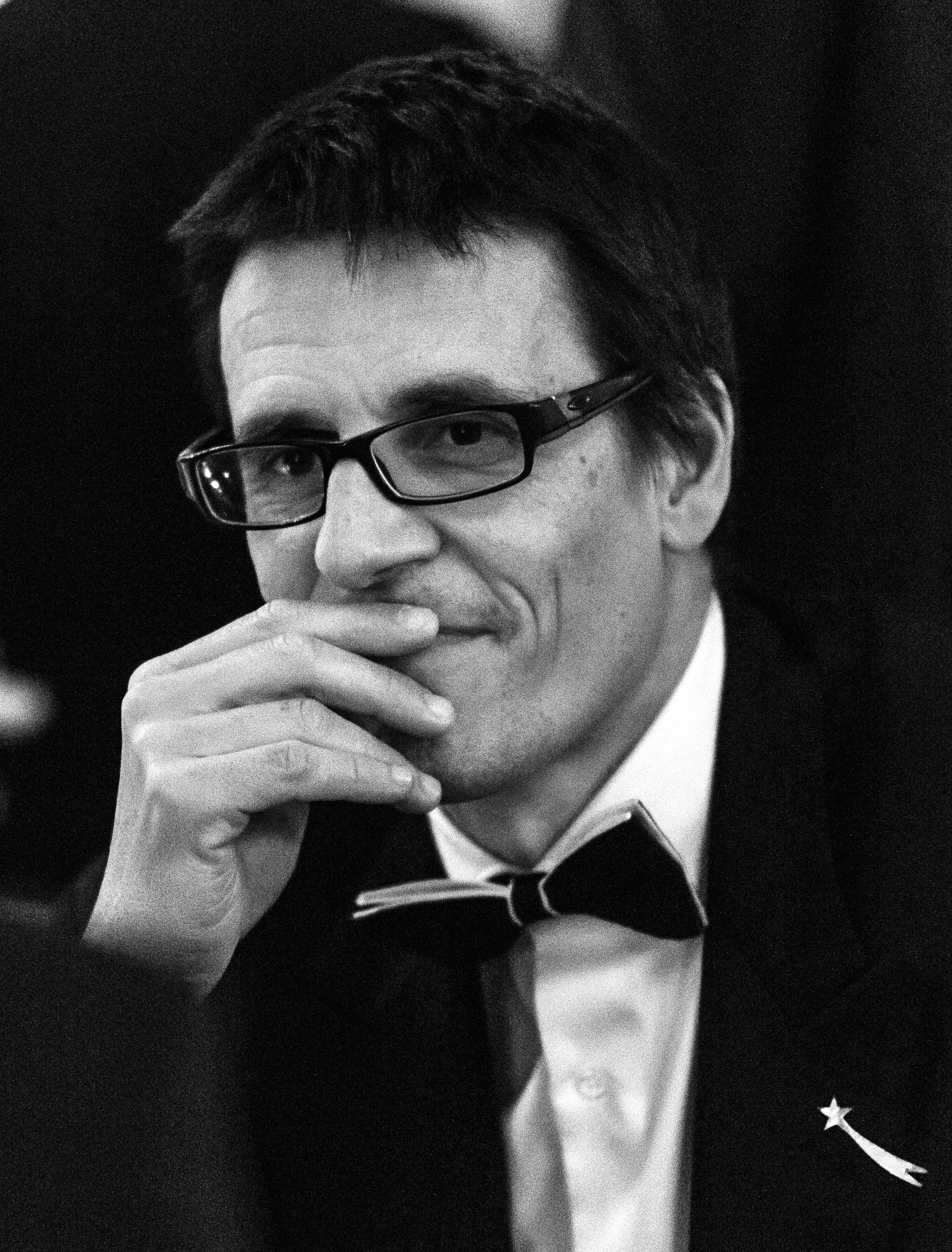
Didier Queloz, recipient of the 2019 Nobel Prize in Physics

=== Notable scholars ===
- Werner Arber (born 1929)
- Fawzia Al-Ashmawi (born 1940s)
- Jonathan Barnes (born 1942)
- Roland Barthes (1915–1980)
- Samuel Baud-Bovy (1906–1986)
- Theodore Beza (1519–1605)
- Yves Bonnefoy (1923–2016)
- Raymond Boudon (born 1934)
- Jacques Bouveresse (1940–2021)
- Bertrand Bouvier (1929–2025)
- János Gausz (1943–2021)
- François Bovon (1938-2013)
- Michel Butor (1926–2016)
- John Calvin (1509–1564)
- Edouard Claparède (1873–1940)
- Raphael H. Cohen (born 1953)
- Georges Cottier (1922–2016)
- Gabriel Cramer (1704–1752)
- Victoria Curzon-Price (born 1942)
- Sheridan Delépine (1855–1921)
- Kuppamuthu Dharmalingam (born 1949)
- Jean-Pierre Eckmann (born 1944)
- Pascal Engel (born 1954)
- Georges Favon (1843–1902)
- Guglielmo Ferrero (1871–1942) (IHEID)
- Adolphe Ferrière (1879–1960)
- Øystein Fischer (1942–2013)
- Théodore Flournoy (1854–1920)
- Harry Gideonse (1901–1985) (IHEID), President of Brooklyn College, and Chancellor of the New School for Social Research
- Jeanne Hersch (1910–2000)
- Bärbel Inhelder (1913–1997)
- Albert Jacquard (1925–2013)
- Hans Kelsen (1881–1973) (IHEID)
- Stephan Klapproth (born 1958)
- Ulrich K. Laemmli (born 1940)
- Jan-Erik Lane (born 1946)
- Nadia Magnenat Thalmann (born 1946)
- Giorgio Malinverni (born 1941) (IHEID)
- Francis Marchal (born 1964)
- Michel Mayor (born 1942)
- Hans Morgenthau (1904–1980) (IHEID)
- Kevin Mulligan (born 1951)
- Robert Mundell (1932–2021) (IHEID)
- Marguerite Narbel (1918–2010)
- Joseph Nye (born 1937) (IHEID)
- Carlo Ossola (born 1946)
- Jean Piaget (1896–1980)
- Jean Pictet (1914–2002)
- Franciscus Portus (1511–1581)
- Albert de Pury (born 1940)
- William Rappard (1883–1958) (IHEID)
- André Rey (1906–1965)
- Gonzague de Reynold (1880–1970)
- Georges de Rham (1903–1990)
- Denis de Rougemont (1906–1985)
- Jean Rousset (1910–2002)
- Ferdinand de Saussure (1857–1913)
- Joseph Justus Scaliger (1540–1609)
- Klaus Scherer (born 1943)
- Klaus Schwab (born 1938)
- Jean de Serres (1540–1598)
- Stanislav Smirnov (born 1970)
- Jean Starobinski (1920–2019)
- Maurice Stroun (1926-2017)
- George Steiner (1929–2020)
- Ernst Stueckelberg (1905–1984)
- Carsten Peter Thiede (1952–2004)
- Chaim Weizmann (1874–1952)
- Éric Werner (born 1940)
- Zhang Weiwei (born 1958) (IHEID)
- Jean Ziegler (born 1934) (IUED)

=== Notable alumni ===
- Henri of Luxembourg (IHEID)
- Maria Teresa Mestre (IHEID)
- Astrid de Belgique (IUEE)
- Joséphine-Charlotte de Belgique
- Nora of Liechtenstein (IHEID)
- Elena Aprile
- Nina Avidar
- Sir Norman Angell
- Natalia Aszkenazy
- José Manuel Durão Barroso (IUEE)
- Ferdinand P. Beer
- Manolo Blahnik
- Nicolas Bouvier
- Marie José Burki
- Micheline Calmy-Rey (IHEID)
- Róbert Cey-Bert
- Marguerite Champendal
- Corinne Chaponnière
- Albert Cohen
- Hernando de Soto (IHEID)
- Ruth Dreifuss
- Paul Dubrule
- Jacques Dubochet
- Elias Farah
- Emanuele Filiberto di Savoia
- Georges Favon
- Ian Fleming
- Paul Flowers
- Yves Flückiger
- Diane von Fürstenberg
- Bonaya Adhi Godana
- Claude Goretta
- Martin Hairer
- Jean Hoerni
- Afet İnan
- Sandra Kalniete (IHEID)
- Sophie Kanza
- Lazare Kopelmanas
- Zygmunt Krasiński
- Frances Lanitou
- Dominique Lévy
- Kaweh Mansouri
- Moshe Many
- Gilles Marchand
- Frank Martin
- Fátima Mereles
- Enrique Moles Ormella
- Serge Moscovici
- François Naef
- Ehsan Naraghi
- Placide Nicod
- Claude Nicollier
- Jean Pictet
- Emma Pieczynska-Reichenbach
- Claude Piron
- Hans-Gert Pöttering (IHEID)
- Nasser Mohammed Al-Ahmed Al-Sabah
- Arnold Reymond
- Hani Ramadan
- Tariq Ramadan
- Şükrü Saracoğlu
- Sophie Schwartz
- Georg Seelig
- Hartley Shawcross, Baron Shawcross
- Riadh Sidaoui (IHEID)
- Marco Solari
- Mirjana Spoljaric Egger
- Alain Tanner
- George Thayer
- Sigmund Widmer
- Germaine Marie Wiswald
- Jürgen Wöhler
- Alan E. Zimmer

== In fiction ==
- James Bond briefly studied at the University of Geneva, as did his creator, Ian Fleming.

== See also ==
- List of early modern universities in Europe
- List of Swiss universities by enrollment
- AISTS, the International Academy of Sport Science and Technology
- Plainpalais
