= Biological Research Centre (Hungarian Academy of Sciences) =

Hungarian research institute

Coordinates: 46.245533°N 20.165215°E

The Biological Research Centre (BRC) of the Hungarian Research Network, HUN-REN (Hungarian: Szegedi Biológiai Központ, pronounced [ˈsɛɡɛdi ˈbijoloːɡijɒji ˈkøspont]) is located in Szeged, Hungary. The research center was founded in 1971, created by Brunó F. Straub, who was director until 1977. As of 2018, the director is Ferenc Nagy. The four institutes of the BRC (Biochemistry, Biophysics, Genetics and Plant Biology) employ about 260 scientists, whose work is used in international scientific publications and patents; past employees include Katalin Karikó. Research topics include several fields of molecular and cell biology: from the industrial use of bacteria, through controlled improvement of cultivated plants, to human health and environmental protection. The BRC is primarily a scientific research centre; however, scientists at the BRC play a role in the foundation and promotion of biotechnological companies and education. The activities and scientific research pursued at the BRC have been acknowledged by the European Molecular Biology Organization (EMBO); in 2000, the BRC was awarded the title of "Centre of Excellence of the European Union" by the EU.

== Institutes ==
- Institute of Biophysics
- Institute of Biochemistry
- Institute of Genetics
- Institute of Plant Biology
