= María Victoria Besonías =

Argentine architect (born 1947)

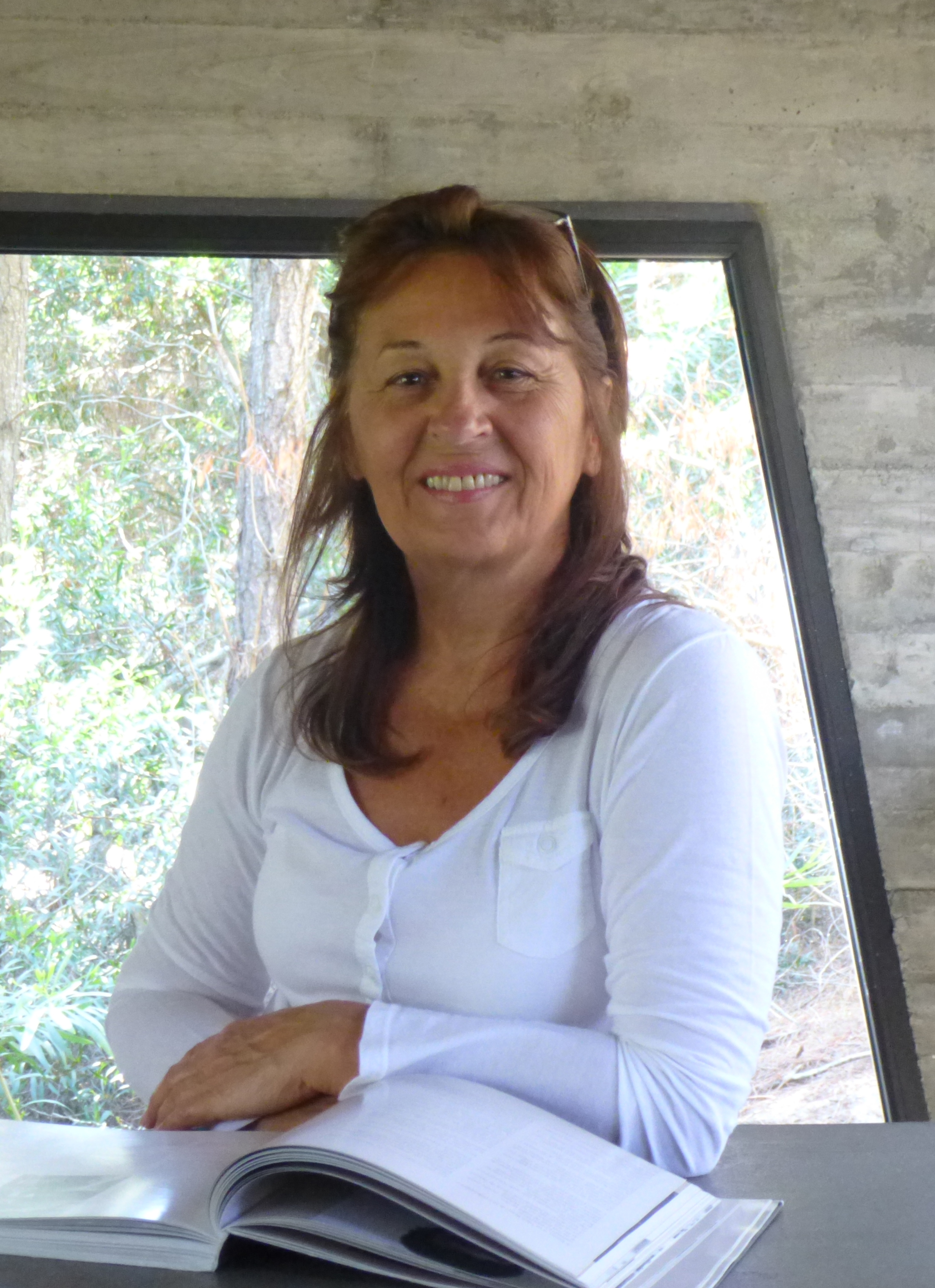
- Born: 8 October 1947 (age 79); Madrid, Spain
- Occupation: Architect

María Victoria Besonías (born 8 October 1947, Madrid) is a Spanish-born Argentinian architect employed at the University of Buenos Aires as a professor of architecture. She has won numerous architectural awards, in 2012 receiving the Trajectory and Merit Award from the Argentine Senate.

== Early career ==
In 1965, Besonías began her undergraduate studies at the Faculty of Architecture and Urbanisnm at the University of Buenos Aires and graduated in 1975. She is faculty at FADU, the University of Buenos Aires, and a member of the jury’s panel of FADEA.

== Works ==
From 1975, she formed a partnership with her husband Guillermo de Almeida. From 1976 until 1997, they worked in tandem with Julián Sirolli, and as head of the BAK studio together with Luciano Kruk from 2000 until 2012, when it was integrated into the Besonias Almeida studio.
