= Maria Zoéga =

Swedish businesswoman (1860– 1940)

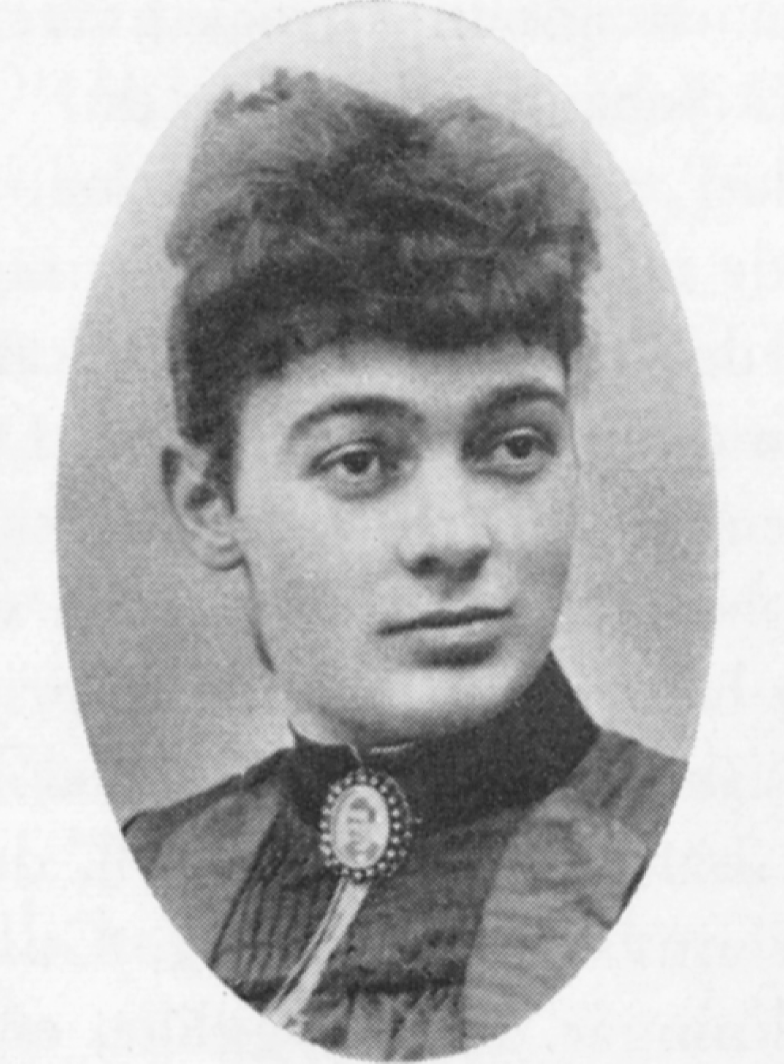
- Born: Maria Tufvesdotter Thunell; 8 December 1860; Källna, Sweden
- Died: 7 July 1940 (aged 79); Helsingborg, Sweden
- Occupation: Businessperson
- Years active: 1886–1940
- Era: 19th–20th century
- Employer: Zoéga Coffee
- Known for: Managing Zoéga Coffee
- Title: Manager of Zoéga Coffee
- Term: 1886–1940
- Predecessor: Carlos Zoéga (husband)
- Successor: Rudolf Zoéga (son)
- Spouses: Carlos Zoéga (m. 1885–1888); Johan Svensson (m. 1890–1940)
- Children: Clara-Maria Zoéga; Carl Thure Zoéga; Johan William Umberto Zoéga; Sven Mauritz Rudolf Zoéga
- Parents: Tufve Jonsson (father); Bengta Persdotter (mother)

Maria Zoéga (née Tufvesdotter Thunell; 8 December 1860 — 7 July 1940) was a Swedish businessperson.

She managed Zoéga Coffee, a successful firm in Helsingborg, from 1886. A brand of coffee, the Maria Zoéga, is named after her.
