= Maria Vittoria Mezza =

Italian politician (1926–2005)

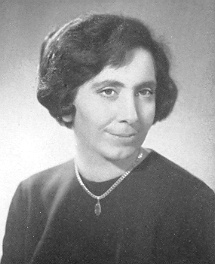
Maria Vittoria Mezza

Maria Vittoria Mezza (3 February 1926 – 24 February 2005) was an Italian socialist and feminist politician. She was elected as a member of the Italian Socialist Party and served as Undersecretary for Industry and Commerce.
