= Maria Selina Hale =

Labor activist in New Zealand

Maria Selina Hale (23 May 1864–5 March 1951) was a New Zealand tailor, trade unionist and senior public servant. She was born in Glasgow, Lanarkshire, Scotland on 23 May 1864.
