= Mario (name) =

Name list

- Pronunciation: UK: /ˈmærioʊ/ US: /ˈmɑːrioʊ/ Italian: [ˈmaːrjo]
- Gender: Masculine
- Languages: Italian, Croatian, German, Spanish, Portuguese, Bulgarian, Romanian, Greek, English, Dutch, Norwegian, Swedish, Danish, Maltese

Mario is the Italian, Croatian, Czech, Norwegian, Slovak, Serbian, Hungarian, Slovene, Polish, Spanish, Danish, Portuguese, Romanian, Swedish, Bulgarian, Greek, German, Dutch, Maltese, and English form of the Latin Roman name Marius.

== Use in various countries ==
The Forebears.io database lists the name Mario as #9 by rank in Italy, #20 in Mexico, #18 in Argentina, #15 in Guatemala for 2014.

In Croatia, the name Mario was among the most common masculine given names in the decades between 1970 and 1999, and was the most common name in the 1970s.

The Portuguese version of the name is spelt Mário (this name has an accent on the letter A because it is a paroxytone word ending in a diphthong).

Notable people and characters named Mario include:

== People ==
=== Artists and entertainments ===
- Mario (tenor) (1810–1883), Giovanni Matteo de Candia, Italian operatic singer
- Mario VI (born 1978), Puerto Rican musician
- Mario (American singer) (born 1986), Mario Dewar Barrett, an American R&B singer
- Mario Abbate (1927–1981), Italian singer and actor
- Mario Abramovich (1926–2014), Argentine violinist and composer
- Mario Acerbi (1887–1982), Italian painter
- Mario Adorf (1930–2026), German actor and writer
- Mario Fernando Aguilera, Argentinian choreographer
- Mario Albertelli (1904–1966), Italian cinematographer
- Mario Alcalde (1926–1971), American film and television actor
- Mario Almirante (1890–1964), Italian film director
- Mario Altéry (1892–1974), French operatic tenor
- Mario Amaya (1933–1986), American art critic
- Mario Amura (born 1973), Italian photographer and cinematographer
- Mario Ancona (1860–1931), Italian operatic singer
- Mario Andreacchio (born 1955), Australian film director
- Mario Armstrong, radio and television talk show host
- Mario Aspa (1797–1868), Italian composer
- Mario Philip Azzopardi (born 1958), Maltese-Canadian television and film director
- Mario Baffico (1907–1972), Italian film director and screenwriter
- Mario Balassi (c. 1604–1667), Italian painter
- Mario Baltadjiev, Bulgarian composer
- Mario Bardi (1922–1998), Italian painter
- Mario Baroffio, Argentine actor
- Mario Barravecchia (born 1976), Belgian Italian singer
- Mario Barri (1928–1963), Filipino actor
- Mario Barth (born 1972), German comedian
- Mario Basiola (1892–1965), Italian opera singer
- Mario Bassil, Lebanese actor, comedian, TV presenter, producer and director
- Mario Bauzá (1911–1993), Cuban-American jazz musician and composer
- Mario Bava (1914–1980), Italian filmmaker
- Mario Beltrami (1902–1987), Italian painter
- Mario Bencomo, Cuban artist
- Mario de Benito (born 1958), Spanish composer
- Mario Bernardi (1930–2013), Canadian conductor and pianist
- Mario Bernardo (1919–2019), Italian cinematographer
- Mario Berriatúa (1925–1970), Spanish actor
- Mario Bertoncini (1932–2019), Italian composer, pianist and music educator
- Mario Besesti (1894–1968), Italian actor and voice actor
- Mario Bettinelli (1880–1953), Italian painter
- Mario Bianchelli, Italian composer
- Mario Bianchi (1939–2022), Italian film director
- Mario Biazzi (1880–1965), Italian painter
- Mario Biondi (born 1971), Italian singer
- Mario Bonnard (1889–1965), Italian actor and film director
- Mario Bonotti, Italian film editor
- Mario Borgiotti (1906–1977), Italian politician
- Mario Braggiotti (1905–1996), American pianist
- Mario Brandenburg (born 1983), German politician
- Mário Brasini (1921–1997), Brazilian actor, screenwriter and film director
- Mario Brega (1923–1994), Italian actor
- Mario Brell (c. 1936–2021), German tenor
- Mario Brenta (born 1942), Italian film director
- Mario Brunello, Italian cellist and musician
- Mario von Bucovich (1884–1947), Austrian photographer
- Mario Caiano (1933–2015), Italian film director and archaeologist
- Mario Caldato, Jr. (born 1961), Brazilian-American record producer and engineer
- Mario Calire (born 1974), American musician
- Mario Camerini (1895–1981), Italian film director and screenwriter
- Mario Camus (1935–2021), Spanish film director and screenwriter
- Mario Canali (born 1952), Italian painter
- Mario Canaro (c. 1903–1974), Argentine musician
- Mario Cantone (born 1959), American comedian and actor
- Mario Capuana, 17th-century Italian composer
- Mario Carbone (1924–2025), Italian director and photographer
- Mario Caribé, Brazilian bassist
- Mario Carillo (1883–1958), Italian actor
- Mario Carotenuto (1916–1995), Italian actor
- Mario Carreño Morales (1913–1999), Cuban-Chilean painter
- Mario Carrero (born 1952), Uruguayan musician
- Mario Casas (born 1986), Spanish actor
- Mario Casaleggio (1877–1953), Italian stage and film actor
- Mario Caserini (1874–1920), Italian film director
- Mario Casilli (1931–2002), American photographer
- Mario Castañeda (born 1962), Mexican voice actor
- Mario Castellani (1906–1978), Italian actor
- Mario Castelnuovo (born 1955), Italian singer-songwriter and composer
- Mario Castelnuovo-Tedesco (1895–1968), Italian-Jewish composer
- Mario Castiglione (born 1995), know professionally as Mameli, Italian singer-songwriter
- Mario Cau (born 1984), Brazilian comics artist
- Mario Cavaglieri (1887–1969), Italian painter
- Mario Cecchi Gori (1920–1993), Italian film producer
- Mario Ceroli (born 1938), Italian sculptor
- Mario Cerrito (born 1984), American filmmaker
- Mario Chamlee (1892–1966), American opera singer
- Mario Chianese (1928–2020), Italian painter
- Mario Chicot, also simply Mario, zouk singer from Guadeloupe
- Mario Cimarro (born 1971), Cuban actor
- Mario Cipollina (born 1954), American bass guitarist
- Mario Colli (1915–1989), Italian actor and voice actor
- Mario Comensoli (1922–1993), Swiss painter
- Mario Cortiello (1907–1981), Italian painter
- Mario Craveri (1902–1999), Italian cinematographer, director and screenwriter
- Mário Cravo Neto (1947–2009), Brazilian photographer
- Mario Cruz, American musician
- Mario Da Vinci (1942–2015), Italian singer and actor
- Mario Dal Fabbro (1913–1990), Italian American sculptor and furniture designer
- Mario Davidovsky (1934–2019), Argentine-American composer
- Mario Dedivanovic (born 1983), American makeup artist
- Mario Del Monaco (1915–1982), Italian opera singer
- Mario Demarco (1917–1970), Argentine musician
- Mário Simões Dias (1903–1974), Portuguese musician
- Mario Domm (born 1977), Mexican singer and member of Camila
- Mario Donatone, (1933–2020), Italian actor
- Mario Donizetti (born 1932), Italian painter
- Mario Dubsky (1939–1985), British painter
- Mario Duplantier (born 1981), French drummer
- Mario Duschenes (1923–2009), Canadian flutist, recorder player and conductor
- Mário Eloy (1900–1951), Portuguese painter
- Mario Escudero (1928–2004), Spanish flamenco guitarist
- Mario Fabrizi (1924–1963), British actor and comedian
- Mario Faig (c. 1905–1984), Argentine actor
- Mario Falcone (born 1988), English television personality
- Mario Faustinelli (1924–2006), Italian comic book artist and editor
- Mario Feliciani (1918–2008), Italian actor
- Mario Ferrari (1894–1974), Italian actor
- Mario Filippeschi (1907–1979), Italian opera singer
- Mario Finotti (born 1950), Italian photographer
- Mario Fischel (born 1958), German actor
- Mario Fortuna (1911–1968), Argentine actor
- Mário Franco (born 1965), Portuguese musician and dancer
- Mario Frangoulis (born 1967), Greek tenor
- Mário Frias (born 1971), Brazilian actor
- Mario Gachet (1879–1981), Italian painter
- Mario Gallardo (born 1937), Cuban-Mexican painter and art critic
- Mario Gallina (1889–1950), Italian actor
- Mario Gamero (1902–1983), Italian painter
- Mario Gareña (1932–2021), Colombian singer and composer
- Mario Gas (born 1947), Spanish actor
- Mario Giacomelli (1925–2000), Italian photographer
- Mario Grigorov, Bulgarian composer and concert pianist
- Mario Gully, American comic book artist
- Mario Häring (born 1989), German pianist
- Mario Iriarte (born 1955), Chilean musician
- Mario Jackson (1961–2007), American actor
- Mario Jean (born 1965), Canadian comedian and actor
- Mario Joyner (born 1961), American stand-up comedian
- Mario Judah (born 1999), American musician
- Mario Kassar (born 1951), Lebanese-American film producer
- Mario Klemens (1936–2025), Czech conductor
- Mario Klingemann, German artist
- Mario Korbel (1882–1954), American sculptor
- Mario Kreutzberger (born 1940), Chilean entertainer
- Mario Kuroba (born 1993), Japanese model and actor
- Mário Laginha (born 1960), Portuguese pianist and composer
- Mário Lago (1911–2002), Brazilian actor, poet and singer
- Mario Lamberto (born 1957), Italian conductor
- Mario Landi (1920–1992), Italian director
- Mario Lang (born 1988), Austrian rock-singer
- Mario Lanza (1921–1959), Italian American opera tenor singer and actor
- Mario Lavezzi (born 1948), Italian composer
- Mario Lavista (1943–2021), Mexican composer
- Mário Lúcio (born 1964), Cape Verdean musical artist
- Mario C. Lugones (1912–1970), Argentine film director
- Mario Maccaferri (1900–1993), Italian luthier and guitarist
- Mario Mafai (1902–1965), Italian painter
- Mario Maisonnave (born 1962), Argentine-Costa Rican singer, songwriter and producer
- Mario Majeroni (c. 1870–1931), American dramatist
- Mario Maranzana (1940–2012), Italian actor and voice actor
- Mario de Maria (1852–1924), Italian painter
- Mario Mariani (born 1970), Italian pianist, composer and performer
- Mario Marmo (1940–2016), Argentine musician
- Mario Martone (born 1959), Italian film director
- Mario Masini (1939–2023), Italian cinematographer and director
- Mario Maskareli (1918–1996), Yugoslav painter
- Mario Mattoli (1898–1980), Italian film director
- Mario Maurano (1905–1974), Argentine film score composer and pianist
- Mario Maurer (born 1988), Thai actor and model
- Mario Maya (1937–2008), Spanish flamenco dancer
- Mario J. McNulty (born 1989), American record producer
- Mario Medrano, Argentine actor
- Mario Menezes (1960–2022), Indian director and actor
- Mario Merz (1925–2003), Italian artist
- Mario Michela, Italian painter
- Mario Migliardi (1919–2000), Italian composer
- Mario Mihaljević, Croatian musician, journalist and writer
- Mario Milita (1923–2017), Italian voice actor
- Mario Millo (born 1955), Australian musician and composer
- Mario Minniti (1577–1640), Italian painter
- Mario Miranda (1926–2011), Indian cartoonist
- Mario Missiroli (1934–2014), Italian stage and film director
- Mario del Monaco (1915–1982), Italian tenor
- Mario Monicelli (1915–2010), Italian film director and screenwriter
- Mario Montenegro (1928–1988), Filipino actor
- Mario Monterosso, Italian-born musician, producer, songwriter, and cabaret and theater performer
- Mario Montez (1935–2013), Puerto Rican actor
- Mario Montuori (1920–1997), Italian cinematographer and painter
- Mario Morán (born 1992), Mexican actor
- Mario Moro (1918–2002), Italian singer
- Mario Morra (1935–2024), Italian film editor, director and screenwriter
- Mario Moschi (1896–1971), Italian sculptor
- Mario Mutis (born 1947), Chilean musician
- Mario Nannini (1895–1918), Italian painter
- Mario Nascimbene (1913–2002), Italian film score composer
- Mario Navarro (born 1949), Mexican actor
- Mario Naves (born 1961), American artist, art critic, professor and blogger
- Mário Negrão (born 1945), Brazilian musician
- Mario Nigro, Italian painter
- Mario Novelli (1940–2016), Italian actor
- Mario Nuzzi (1603–1673), Italian painter
- Mario O'Hara (1946–2012), Filipino television and film director; screenwriter
- Mario Opazo, Colombian artist
- Mario Pabón (1930–1996), Dominican-Puerto Rican actor, director and show host
- Mario Paci (1878–1946), Italian pianist and conductor
- Mario Panzeri (1911–1991), Italian composer
- Mario Paolucci (1941–2008), Argentine film actor
- Mario Parga (born 1969), English guitarist
- Mario Parial (1944–2013), Filipino painter
- Mario Parmisano (born 1960), Argentinian jazz pianist
- Mario Parodi (1917–1970), Turkish classical guitarist
- Mario Pasik (born 1951), Argentine actor
- Mario Passano (1925–1995), Argentine actor
- Mario Pavone (1940–2021), American jazz musician
- Mario Pelchat (born 1964), Canadian Francophone singer
- Mario Petreković (born 1972), Croatian television actor and presenter
- Mario Petri (1922–1985), Italian opera singer
- Mario Pigazzini, Italian conductor
- Mario Pilati (1903–1938), Italian conductor
- Mario Pisu (1910–1976), Italian actor
- Mario Più (born 1965), Italian DJ
- Mario Pomar (1920–1987), Argentine singer
- Mario Prassinos (1916–1985), Greek artist
- Mario Prayer (1887–1959), Italian painter
- Mario Puccini (1869–1920), Italian painter
- Mario Pupella (1945–2023), Italian actor and stage director
- Mario Radice (1898–1987), Italian painter
- Mario Raggi (1821–1907), Italian sculptor
- Mario Ramos (born 1973), Spanish actor, musician and poet
- Mario Raskin, Argentine harpsichordist
- Mario Reyes (1926–2017), Mexican printmaker, painter and sculptor
- Mario Righetti, Italian painter
- Mario Riva (1913–1960), Italian actor
- Mario Robinson, American painter
- Mario Roccuzzo (1940–2021), American actor
- Mario Roncoroni, Italian film director
- Mario Rosenstock (born 1970), Irish actor, comedian and musician
- Mario Rubalcaba (born 1972), American musician
- Mario Russo, Italian film director and assistant director
- Mario Rutelli (1859–1941), Italian sculptor
- Mario Sábato (1945–2023), Argentine film director and screenwriter
- Mario Saint-Amand (born 1968), Canadian actor
- Mario Sammarco (1868–1930), Italian operatic baritone
- Mario Salvini (1863–1940), Italian sculptor
- Mario Santoro Woith (born 1968), Italian photographer
- Mario Sapag (1930–2012), Argentinian actor
- Mario Sarto (1885–1955), Italian sculptor
- Mario Savioni (c. 1608–1685), Italian composer
- Mario Scaccia (1919–2011), Italian actor
- Mario Schiano (1933–2008), Italian saxophonist
- Mario Schifano (1934–1998), Italian painter
- Mário Schoemberger (1952–2008), Brazilian actor
- Mario Sciacca, Italian-Danish singer, part of the Danish pop duo Muri & Mario
- Mario Sclaniza, Italian actor and sculptor
- Mario Serandrei (1907–1966), Italian film editor
- Mario Sereni (1928–2015), Italian opera singer
- Mario Siciliano (c. 1925–1987), Italian film director, screenwriter and film producer
- Mario Siletti (1903–1964), Italian actor
- Mario Sironi (1885–1961), Italian painter
- Mario Sixtus, German journalist, filmmaker and screenwriter
- Mario Soffici (1900–1977), Argentine film director, actor and screenwriter
- Mario Soldati (1906–1999), Italian film director
- Mario Sorrenti (born 1971), Italian American photographer
- Mario Spinetti (1848–1925), Italian painter
- Mario Talavera (1885–1960), Mexican musician
- Mario Tessuto (1943–2024), Italian singer
- Mario Testino (born 1954), Italian Peruvian photographer
- Mario Tiberini (1826–1880), Italian opera singer
- Mario Titi (1921–1982), Italian painter
- Mario Toral (born 1934), Chilean painter and photographer
- Mario Torroella (born 1935), Cuban artist and architect
- Mario Tosi (1935–2021), Italian-American cinematographer
- Mario Tozzi (1895–1979), Italian painter
- Mario Trabucco (1951–2025), Italian violinist
- Mario Trevi (born 1941), Italian singer
- Mario Uggeri (1924–2004), Italian comics artist and painter
- Mario Urteaga Alvarado (1875–1957), Peruvian painter
- Mario Valdemarin (1926–2023), Italian actor
- Mario Van Peebles (born 1957), American director and actor
- Mario Vaquerizo (born 1974), Spanish collaborator of radio and television
- Mario Vazquez (born 1977), American Idol contestant and singer
- Mario Vellani Marchi (1895–1979), Italian painter
- Mario Venuti (born 1963), Italian composer
- Mario Venzago, Swiss conductor
- Mário Viegas (1948–1996), Portuguese actor and poetry reciter
- Mario Vitale (1923–2003), Italian actor
- Mario Volpe (1894–1968), Italian actor
- Mario Vulpiani (born 1927), Italian cinematographer and documentarist
- Mario Wallenda (1940–2015), American acrobat
- Mario Winans (born 1974), R&B singer
- Mario Ybarra, Jr., American artist
- Mario Zafred (1922–1987), Italian composer
- Mario Armond Zamparelli (1921–2012), American artist
- Mario Zampi (1903–1963), Italian film producer and director
- Mario Zan (1920–2006), Italian accordionist based in Brazil
- Mario Zanini (1907–1971), Brazilian painter
- Mario Roberto Zuñiga, Salvadoran musician

=== Politicians and economists ===
- Mario Abel Amaya (1935–1976), Argentine lawyer and politician
- Mario Acuña Cisternas (born 1951), Chilean politician
- Mario Adinolfi (born 1971), Italian politician
- Mario Agodino, Argentine politician
- Mario Aguiñada Carranza (1942–2015), Salvadoran politician
- Mário Albino, Mozambican politician
- Mario Alegría (born 1968), Peruvian politician and congressman
- Mario Alicata (1918–1966), Italian politician
- Mário Júlio de Almeida Costa (1927–2025), Portuguese jurist and politician
- Mario Amadeo (1911–1983), Argentine politician, diplomat and writer
- Mario Amilivia (born 1957), Spanish politician
- Mario Antonio Andino (1936–2014), Salvadoran politician
- Mario Aoun (born 1951), Lebanese politician
- Mario Arcelli (1935–2004), Italian economist
- Mario Artali (1938–2023), Italian politician
- Mario Asselin, Canadian politician
- Mario Baccini (born 1957), Italian politician
- Mario Baldassarri (born 1946), Italian economist and politician
- Mario Banožić (born 1979), Croatian politician
- Mario Alexander Barahona Martínez (born 1976), Honduran politician
- Mario Barletta (born 1953), Argentine hydraulic engineer and politician
- Mario Beaulieu (senator) (1930–1998), Canadian politician
- Mario Beaulieu (born 1959), Canadian politician
- Mario Beccaria (1920–2003), Italian politician
- Mario Berlinguer (1891–1969), Italian politician
- Mario Bertolino (born 1954), Chilean politician
- Mario Ramón Beteta (1925–2004), Mexican economist
- Mario Biaggi (1917–2015), American politician
- Mario Blasich (1878–1945), Italian politician
- Mario Blejer (born 1948), Argentine economist
- Mario Borghese (born 1981), Italian politician
- Mario Borghezio (born 1947), Italian politician
- Mario Bowleg, Bahamian politician
- Mario Bravo (1882–1944), Argentine politician and writer
- Mario Briceño Iragorry (1897–1958), Venezuelan writer and politician
- Mario Búcaro (born 1977), Guatemalan diplomat
- Mario Cafiero (1956–2020), Argentine politician
- Mário Calixto Filho (1946–2020), Brazilian politician
- Mario Calleja (born 1957), Maltese politician
- Mario Cámpora (1930–2022), Argentine diplomat
- Mario Capanna (born 1945), Italian politician and writer
- Mario J. Cariello (1907–1985), American politician and judge
- Mario Miguel Carrillo Huerta (born 1947), Mexican politician
- Mario Casalinuovo (1922–2018), Italian politician
- Mario Castaño (1971–2023), Colombian accountant and politician
- Mario Catania (born 1952), Italian politician
- Mário Centeno (born 1966), Portuguese economist, politician and banker
- Mario Chella (1934–2022), Italian politician
- Mário Chermont (1937–2020), Brazilian politician
- Mario Chirinos (born 1978), Honduran politician
- Mario Choque (born 1954), Bolivian politician
- Mario Cimadevilla (born 1954), Argentine politician
- Mario Cingolani (1883–1971), Italian politician
- Mario Civera (born 1946), American politician
- Mario Conte (born 1979), Italian politician
- Mario di Costanzo (born 1962), Mexican politician
- Mário Covas (1930–2001), Brazilian politician
- Mario Crescenzio (1942–2024), Italian politician
- Mario Cruz Andrade (born 1957), Mexican politician
- Mario Alejandro Cuevas Mena (born 1972), Mexican politician
- Mario Carlos Culebro (born 1958), Mexican politician
- Mario Cuomo (1932–2015), governor of New York
- Mario Czaja (born 1975), German politician
- Mario Daniele (born 1961), Argentine politician
- Mario Ernesto Dávila Aranda (born 1959), Mexican politician
- Mario M. DeOptatis (1903–1979), American lawyer and politician
- Mario Desbordes (born 1968), Chilean politician
- Mario Devaud (born 1955), Chilean politician
- Mario Diana (born 1947), Italian politician
- Mario Díaz-Balart (born 1961), member of the U. S. House of Representatives
- Mario Draghi (born 1947), former Prime Minister of Italy and former president of the ECB
- Mario Dueñas
- Mario Dumont (born 1970), Canadian politician
- Mario Durán (born 1983), Salvadoran politician
- Mario Echandi Jiménez (1915–2011), Costa Rican president
- Mario Farrugia Borg (born 1970), Maltese politician and diplomat
- Mario Fasino (1920–2017), Italian politician
- Mario Fehr (born 1958), Swiss politician
- Mario Feleppa, Australian politician
- Mario Ferreiro (born 1959), mayor of Asunción
- Mario Ferri (Italian politician) (1927–1978)
- Mario Ferri (born 1948), Italian-Canadian politician
- Mario Fiad (born 1957), Argentine politician
- Mario P. Fiori (born 1941), American government official
- Mario Floris (born 1937), Italian politician
- Mario Luis Fuentes (born 1956), Mexican politician and economist
- Mario Furore (born 1988), Italian politician
- Mario Gallegos Jr. (1950–2012), American politician
- Mario Garcés (born 1967), Spanish politician
- Mario Gargano (1929–2018), Italian politician
- Mario Gaztambide (1949–2005), American politician
- Mario Gentile, municipal politician in Toronto
- Mario Giarrusso (born 1965), Italian politician
- Mario Goico (born 1945), American politician
- Mário da Graça Machungo (1940–2020), Mozambican politician
- Mario Guarente (born 1983), Italian politician
- Mario Guillén (born 1968), Bolivian Minister of Economy
- Mario Francisco Guillén Guillén (born 1970), Mexican politician
- Mario Gulibert (born 1953), Palauan politician
- Mario Hamuy Berr (1926–2011), Chilean politician
- Mario Héber Usher (1921–1980), Uruguayan politician
- Mario Germán Iguarán Arana (born 1960), Colombian lawyer and politician
- Mario Alberto Ishii (born 1951), Argentine politician
- Mário Juruna (1943–2002), Brazilian politician
- Mario Kadastik (born 1981), Estonian politician
- Mario Kordić (born 1972), Bosnian Croat politician and physician
- Mario Kunasek (born 1976), Austrian politician
- Mario Laframboise (born 1957), Canadian politician
- Mario Lago (1878–1950), Italian statesman and diplomat
- Mario Landolfi (born 1959), Italian politician
- Mario Landriscina (born 1954), Italian politician
- Mario Leito (born 1964), Argentine politician
- Mário Lemos Pires (1930–2009), Portuguese colonial governor
- Mario Leone (1922–2013), Italian politician
- Mario Lindner (born 1982), Austrian politician
- Mário Lino, Portuguese politician and civil engineer
- Mario Lolini (born 1958), Italian politician
- Mario Lucini (born 1958), Italian politician
- Mário da Graça Machungo (1940–2020), Mozambican politician
- Mario Mantovani (born 1950), Italian politician
- Mario Marcel (born 1959), Chilean economist
- Mario Marchant Binder (1920–1987), Chilean politician
- Mario de Marco (born 1965), Maltese politician
- Mario Martinelli (1906–2001), Italian politician
- Mario Masher (died 2020), South African politician
- Mario Masuku (1951–2021), Swazi politician
- Mario Mattera (born 1963), American politician
- Mario Mauro (born 1961), Italian politician
- Mario Gene Mendiola (died 2021), Filipino politician
- Mario Mendoza Cortés (1968–2015), Mexican politician
- Mario Meoni (1965–2021), Argentine politician
- Mario Mettbach (1952–2022), German politician
- Mario Michel (born 1960), Saint Lucian lawyer and politician
- Mario Mieruch (born 1975), German politician
- Mario Moine (born 1949), Argentine politician
- Mario Monje (1929–2019), Bolivian politician
- Mario Monti (born 1943), Italian economist and former Prime Minister of Italy
- Mario Mosquera Roa
- Mario Moya Palencia (1933–2006), Mexican politician
- Mario Negri (born 1954), Argentine politician and lawyer
- Mário Negromonte (born 1950), Brazilian politician
- Mário Negromonte Jr. (born 1980), Brazilian politician
- Mario Nenadić (born 1964), Bosnian politician
- Mario das Neves (1951–2017), Argentine politician
- Mario Nobilo (born 1952), Croatian politician and diplomat
- Mario Oliverio (born 1953), Italian politician
- Mario Eduardo Ortega (born 1956), Filipino politician
- Mario Oyarzabal (born 1969), Argentinian diplomat
- Mario Palestro (1921–2000), Chilean politician
- Mario Palumbo (1933–2004), American politician
- Mario Pannunzio (1910–1968), Italian politician
- Mario Papi (1946–2012), Chilean politician
- Mario Roberto Paz, Guatemalan politician
- Mario Pedini (1918–2003), Italian politician
- Mario Perani (1936–2023), Italian politician
- Mário Pereira (born 1945), Brazilian politician
- Mario Laserna Pinzón (1923–2013), Colombian politician
- Mário Pires (born 1949), Bissau-Guinean politician
- Mario Polar Ugarteche (1912–1988), Peruvian politician and writer
- Mario Ponce (born 1963), Salvadoran accountant and politician
- Mario Primicerio (1940–2025), Italian politician
- Mario Prunas (died 1982), Italian diplomat
- Mario Racco (born 1955), Canadian politician
- Mario Ratzki, American politician
- Mario Read Vittini (1926–2010), Dominican Republic politician
- Mario Reyes Aroca (1940–2009), Chilean politician
- Mario Joel Reyes (born 1952), Filipino politician
- Mario J. Rizzo, American economist
- Mario Sandoval Alarcón (1923–2003), Guatemalan politician
- Mario Ríos Santander (born 1945), Chilean politician
- Mario Roberto Santucho (1936–1976), Argentine revolutionary and guerrilla combatant
- Mario Savio (1942–1996), American political activist
- Mario Scavello (born 1952), American politician
- Mario Scelba (1901–1991), Italian politician
- Mario Scialoja (1930–2012), Italian diplomat
- Mario Segni (born 1939), Italian politician
- Mario Edgardo Segura (born 1966), Honduran politician
- Mario Simard, Canadian politician
- Mário Soares (1924–2017), Portuguese politician and the former Prime Minister of Portugal
- Mario Tanassi (1916–2007), Italian politician
- Mario Taracena (born 1957), Guatemalan politician
- Mario Tassone (born 1943), Italian politician
- Mario Enrique del Toro (1966–2024), Mexican politician
- Mario Toros (1922–2018), Italian politician
- Mário Genival Tourinho (1933–2024), Brazilian politician
- Mario Tronti (1931–2023), Italian philosopher and politician
- Mario Trujillo García (1920–2007), Mexican politician
- Mario Umana (1914–2005), American judge and politician
- Mario Uribe Escobar (born 1949), Colombian politician and lawyer
- Mario Urrutia Carrasco (1925–2003), Chilean politician
- Mario Franco Valencia (born 1969), Mexican politician
- Mario Zepahua Valencia (born 1970), Mexican politician
- Mario Valiante (1925–2018), Italian politician
- Mario Vallejo Estévez (born 1959), Mexican politician
- Mario Varela Herrera (born 1953), Chilean politician
- Mario Venegas Cárdenas (born 1957), Chilean politician
- Mário Carrascalão (1937–2017), East Timorese-Indonesian politician
- Mario Villanueva (born 1948), Mexican politician
- Mario Voigt (born 1977), German politician
- Mario Wohlwend (born 1973), Liechtenstein politician
- Mario Zagari (1913–1996), Italian politician
- Mario Zotta (1904–1963), Italian politician

=== Sportsmen ===
- Mario Abadía (born 1986), Colombian footballer
- Mario Abboud (born 1981), Lebanese basketball player
- Mario Abenza (born 1996), Spanish footballer
- Mario Abrante (born 1982), Spanish footballer
- Mario Acchini (1915–1991), Italian rower
- Mario Acerbi (1913–2010), Italian footballer
- Mario Acevedo (born 1969), Guatemalan football forward
- Mario Addison (born 1987), American football player
- Mario Aerts (born 1974), Belgian cyclist
- Mario Agiu (born 1956), Romanian footballer
- Mario Agosti (1904–1992), Italian javelin thrower
- Mario Aguero (basketball) (1924–2001), Cuban basketball player
- Mario Aibekob (born 1990), Indonesian professional footballer
- Mario Aji (born 2004), Indonesian motorcycle racer
- Mario Alborta (1910–1976), Bolivian footballer
- Mario Alesini (1931–2001), Italian basketball player
- Mario Alford (born 1992), American gridiron football player
- Mario Almario (born 1934), Filipino sailor
- Mário Almaský (born 1991), Slovak footballer
- Mario Altmann (born 1986), Austrian ice hockey player
- Mario Ančić (born 1984), Croatian professional tennis player
- Mario Anderson (born 2001), American football player
- Mario Andretti (born 1940), American race car driver
- Mario Andric (born 1998), Austrian association footballer
- Mario Anni (born 1943), Italian cyclist
- Mario Aparicio (born 2000), Spanish cyclist
- Mario Aquilina (born 1975), Maltese sailor
- Mario Arana (1884–1931), Spanish footballer
- Mário de Araújo Cabral (1934–2020), Portuguese racing driver
- Mario Aravena (born 1985), Chilean footballer
- Mario Ardissone (1900–1975), Italian footballer
- Mario Ardizzon (1938–2012), Italian footballer
- Mario Arencibia (born 1924), Cuban baseball player
- Mario Ariosa (1920–1992), Cuban baseball player
- Mario Armano (born 1946), Italian bobsledder
- Mario de Armas (1915–1986), Cuban sports shooter
- Mario Arqués (born 1992), Spanish footballer
- Mario Arranz (born 1978), Spanish rower
- Mario Arteaga (born 1970), Mexican footballer
- Mario Artistico (born 1985), Italian footballer
- Mário Artur (born 1969), Portuguese-born Mozambican footballer and manager
- Mario Astaburuaga (1904–1951), Chilean swimmer
- Mario Astorri (1920–1989), Italian footballer and manager
- Mario Austin (born 1982), American basketball player
- Mario Avellaneda (born 1974), Spanish race walker
- Mario van Baarle (born 1965), Dutch cyclist
- Mario Babić (born 1992), Croatian footballer
- Mario Bacher (1941–2014), Italian cross-country skier
- Mario Baesso (born 1945), Brazilian footballer
- Mario Baeza (1916–1993), Chilean footballer
- Mario Bailey (born 1970), American football player
- Mario Bakary (born 1988), Malagasy footballer
- Mário Balbúrdia (born 1997), Angolan professional footballer
- Mario Balla (1903–1964), Italian water polo player
- Mario Balleri (1902–1962), Italian rower
- Mario Balotelli (born 1990), Italian footballer
- Mario Barcia (born 1989), Argentine association football player
- Mario Barco (born 1992), Spanish footballer
- Mario Barić (born 1985), Bosnian Croat footballer
- Mario Barjamaj (born 1998), Albanian footballer
- Mario Barone (born 1948), Italian-born Canadian soccer player
- Mario Baroni (1927–1994), Italian cyclist
- Mario Barrera (born 1963), Argentine football manager
- Mario Barrios (born 1991), American boxer
- Mario Basler (born 1968), German football player and manager
- Mario Bates (born 1973), American football player
- Mario Bautista (born 1993), American mixed martial artist
- Mario Bazán (born 1987), Peruvian runner
- Mario Bazina (born 1975), Croatian footballer
- Mario Beata (born 1974), Honduran footballer
- Mario Beccia (born 1955), Italian cyclist
- Mario Becerril (1917–2018), Mexican equestrian
- Mario Bedogni (1923–2017), Italian ice hockey player
- Mario Been (born 1963), Dutch footballer and manager
- Mario Behrendt (1960–2022), East German boxer
- Mario Belcon (born 1986), Trinidadian cricketer
- Mario Benetton (born 1974), Italian cyclist
- Mario Bennett (born 1973), American basketball player
- Mario Beretta (born 1959), Italian footballer and manager
- Mario Bergamaschi (1929–2020), Italian footballer
- Mario Bermejo (born 1978), Spanish retired professional footballer
- Mario Bertini (born 1944), Italian footballer
- Mario Bertolo (1929–2009), French cyclist
- Mario Beshiraj (born 1999), Albanian footballer
- Mario Biancalana (1902–1990), Brazilian fencer
- Mario Bianchini (1911–1957), Italian boxer
- Mário Bicák (born 1979), Slovak footballer
- Mario Bigoni (1984–2011), Swiss-Italian footballer
- Mario Bilate (born 1991), Dutch association footballer
- Mario Bilen (born 1985), Croatian footballer
- Mario Binato (born 1940), Italian long-distance runner
- Mario Bistoletti, Argentine water polo player
- Mario Blandón, Honduran footballer
- Mário Bližňák (born 1987), Slovak ice hockey player
- Mario Bliznakov (born 1982), Bulgarian football midfielder
- Mario Bocaly (born 1978), French association football manager
- Mario Boccalatte (1933–2021), Italian footballer
- Mario Boero (1893–1973), Italian water polo player
- Mario Bokara (born 1980), Croatian-American professional wrestler
- Mario Bolatti (born 1985), Argentine footballer
- Mario Boljat (1951–2024), Croatian professional footballer
- Mario Bolter (born 1984), Austrian footballer
- Mario Bonello (born 1974), Maltese sprinter
- Mario Boni (born 1963), Italian basketball player
- Mario Bonić (born 1952), Croatian footballer
- Mario Bonomo (1912–1983), Italian ski jumper
- Mario Booysen (born 1988), South African football defender
- Mario Borroto, Cuban baseball player
- Mario Bortolazzi (born 1965), Italian footballer and manager
- Mario Bortolotto (1957–2022), Australian rules footballer
- Mario Borzic, mixed martial artist
- Mario Bossi (1909–2003), Italian footballer
- Mario Boyé (1922–1992), Argentine footballer
- Mario Božić (1983–2023), Bosnian footballer
- Mario Alfonso Bran (born 1989), Guatemalan racewalker
- Mario Branch (1979–2011), American football player
- Mário Branco (born 1975), Portuguese football manager
- Mario Bratu (born 2002), Romanian footballer
- Mário Breška (born 1979), Slovak footballer
- Mario Briceño (born 1996), Chilean footballer
- Mario Brignoli (1902–1990), Italian racewalker
- Mario Brito (born 1966), Dominican baseball player
- Mario Brnjac (1944–2007), Croatian footballer
- Mario Brodmann (born 1966), Swiss ice hockey player
- Mario Brown (c. 1951–2002), American basketball player
- Mario Brunetta (born 1967), Canadian ice hockey player
- Mario Bruschera (1887–1968), Italian cyclist
- Mario Bruzzone (1887–1940), Italian sailor
- Mario Buckup (born 1947), Brazilian sailor
- Mario Budimir (born 1986), Croatian footballer
- Mario Bühler (born 1992), Swiss footballer
- Mario Burić (born 1991), Croatian footballer
- Mario Burke (born 1997), Barbadian sprinter
- Mario Butler (born 1957), Panamanian basketball player
- Mario Butler (American football) (born 1988), American gridiron football player
- Mario Büttner (born 1967), German wrestler
- Mario Bytyçi (born 1985), Albanian footballer
- Mario Cabrera (born 1956), Argentine retired footballer
- Mario Caccia (1920–?), Italian footballer
- Mario Cáceres (born 1981), Chilean footballer
- Mario Camacho (born 1983), Costa Rican footballer
- Mário Campos (born 1947), Portuguese footballer
- Mario Campos López (born 1943), Mexican chess player
- Mario Camposeco (1921–1951), Guatemalan footballer
- Mario Cantaluppi (born 1974), Swiss footballer
- Mario Cantero (born 2002), Spanish footballer
- Mario Capio (1924–2000), Italian sailor
- Mario Roberto Carballo (born 1952), Argentinian politician
- Mario Carević (born 1982), Croatian footballer and manager
- Mário Carlos (born 1983), Portuguese footballer
- Mário Carlos Moraes Soares (born 1966), Brazilian footballer
- Mario Carreras (born 1966), Argentine rugby union player
- Mario Carrillo (born 1956), Mexican footballer and manager
- Mario Cartelli (born 1979), Czech ice hockey player
- Mario Carulla (born 1971), Peruvian badminton player
- Mário de Carvalho (1905–?), Portuguese footballer
- Mario de las Casas (1901–2002), Peruvian footballer
- Mario Casasús (1894–?), Mexican bobsledder
- Mario Casati (born 1944), Italian boxer
- Mario Cassano (born 1983), Italian former professional footballer
- Mario Castellazzi (1935–2018), Italian footballer
- Mario Castillo (born 1951), Salvadoran footballer
- Mário de Castro (1905–1998), Brazilian footballer
- Mario Cavalla (1902–1962), Italian ski jumper
- Mario Cazzaniga, Italian water polo player
- Mario Celon (born 1959), Italian sailor
- Mario Celotto (born 1956), American football player
- Mario Centeno (born 1961), Nicaraguan boxer
- Mário César (born 1977), Brazilian footballer
- Mario Cevasco (1938–1999), Italian water polo player
- Mario Chaldú (1942–2020), Argentine footballer
- Mario Chalmers (born 1986), American basketball player
- Mario Chávez (1929–2007), Argentine swimmer
- Mario Checcacci (1909–1990), Italian rower
- Mario Chiarini (born 1981), Italian baseball player
- Mario Chirino, Chilean football manager and player
- Mario Chitaroni (born 1967), Italian-Canadian ice hockey player
- Mario Ciminaghi (1910–?), Italian footballer
- Mario Ciocco (1907–1967), Swiss sports shooter
- Mario Cipollini (born 1967), Italian road cyclist
- Mario Cipriani (1909–1944), Italian cyclist
- Mario Čižmek (born 1975), Croatian footballer
- Mario Clark (born 1954), Americ
- Mario Climent (born 2002), Spanish footballer
- Mario Clopatofsky (born 1958), Colombian sports shooter
- Mario Colarossi (1929–2010), Italian sprinter
- Mario Coll (born 1960), Colombian footballer
- Mário Coluna (1935–2014), Portuguese footballer
- Mario Contra (born 1999), Romanian footballer
- Mario Wilfredo Contreras (born 1987), Salvadoran cyclist
- Mario Cordero (1930–2002), Costa Rican footballer
- Mário Correia (born 1978), Cape Verdean basketball player
- Mario Corso (1941–2020), Italian footballer
- Mario Costas (born 1981), Argentine footballer
- Mario Cota (born 1990), Mexican athlete
- Mario Cotelo (born 1975), Spanish footballer
- Mario Craver (born 2006), American football player
- Mario Crete (c. 1914–2000), Canadian wrestler
- Mario Cristobal (born 1970), American football coach and former player
- Mario Crnički (born 1998), Croatian footballer
- Mario Cuba (born 1992), Peruvian badminton player
- Mario Ćubel (born 1990), Croatian footballer
- Mario Cuéllar (born 1989), Bolivian footballer
- Mario Cuenca (born 1975), Argentine footballer
- Mario Cuevas (born 1949), Mexican long-distance runner
- Mario Čuić (born 2001), Croatian footballer
- Mario Ćurić (born 1998), Croatian association football player
- Mario Curletto (1935–2004), Italian fencer
- Mario Čutura (born 1978), Croatian footballer
- Mario Ćuže (born 1999), Croatian footballer
- Mario Cvitanović (born 1975), Croatian footballer and manager
- Mario D'Agata (1926–2009), Italian boxer
- Mario Da Pozzo (born 1939), Italian former football goalkeeper
- Mario Dajsinani (born 1998), Albanian footballer
- Mario Danelo (1985–2007), American football player
- Mario Daser (born 1988), German boxer
- Mario De Bénédictis (born 1966), Canadian-Italian ice hockey player
- Mario De Clercq (born 1966), Belgian cyclist
- Mario De Meo (born 1974), Italian taekwondo practitioner
- Mario De Micheli (1906–?), Italian footballer
- Mario De Negri (1901–1978), Italian sprinter and hurdler
- Mario Delač (born 1985), Croatian swimmer
- Mario Delaš (born 1990), Croatian basketball player
- Mario Della-Fina (1898–?), Italian cyclist
- Mario DeMarco (1924–1956), Canadian and American football player
- Mario Des Forges (born 1965), Canadian judoka
- Mario Desiderio (born 1938), Argentinian footballer
- Mario Deslauriers (born 1965), Canadian equestrian
- Mario Di Stazio (born 1951), Italian canoeist
- Mario Dimitrov (born 1994), Bulgarian footballer
- Mario Dolder (born 1990), Swiss biathlete
- Mario Domínguez (born 1975), Mexican race car driver
- Mario Domínguez (footballer, born 2004), Spanish footballer
- Mario Domínguez (footballer, born 2009), Spanish footballer
- Mario Donadoni (born 1979), Italian footballer
- Mario Dorgeles (born 2004), Ivorian association football player
- Mario Dorner (born 1970), Austrian professional footballer
- Mario Dotti, Italian rugby union player
- Mario Doyon (born 1968), Canadian retired ice hockey defenseman
- Mário Dunlop (born 1946), Brazilian volleyball player
- Mario Ebenhofer (born 1992), Austrian footballer
- Mario Edwards (born 1975), American football player and coach
- Mario Edwards Jr. (born 1994), American football player
- Mario Eggimann (born 1981), Swiss footballer
- Mario Elie (born 1963), American basketball player
- Mario Encarnación (1975–2005), Dominican baseball player
- Mario van der Ende (born 1956), Dutch football referee and coordinator
- Mario Engels (born 1993), German footballer
- Mario Erb (born 1990), German footballer
- Mario Ervedosa (born 1998), Angolan swimmer
- Mario Espartero (born 1978), French footballer
- Mario Evaristo (1908–1993), Argentine footballer
- Mário Évora (born 1999), Cape Verdean footballer
- Mario Facco (1946–2018), Italian footballer and manager
- Mario Fafangel (1914–2007), Slovenian sailor
- Mario Fannin (born 1987), American gridiron football player
- Mario Farnbacher (born 1992), German racing driver
- Mario Farrugia (born 1955), Maltese footballer
- Mario Fatafehi (born 1979), American gridiron football player
- Mario Faubert (born 1954), Canadian ice hockey player
- Mario Fayos (1927–?), Uruguayan athlete
- Mario Fazio (1919–1983), Italian cyclist
- Mário Felgueiras (born 1986), Portuguese footballer
- Mario Feliciano (born 1998), Puerto Rican baseball player
- Mario Fenech (born 1961), Australian rugby league player
- Mario Ferraris (born 1968), Italian racing driver
- Mario Ferraro (born 1998), Canadian ice hockey player
- Mario Ferrera (born 1987), Spanish male volleyball player
- Mario Figueredo (1926–?), Uruguayan cyclist
- Mario Figueroa (born 1963), Venezuelan road cyclist
- Mário Filipovič (born 1976), Slovak sport shooter
- Mario Fillinger (born 1984), German footballer
- Mario Finarolli (born 1953), Argentinian association football player
- Mario Fioretti (born 1973), American basketball player and coach
- Mario Fiorillo (born 1962), Italian water polo player
- Mario Fischer (born 1989), Austrian ice hockey player
- Mario Foglia (1921–1999), Italian footballer and manager
- Mario Fontanella (born 1989), Italian footballer
- Mario Ford (born 1958), Bahamian cricketer
- Mario Forsythe (born 1985), Jamaican sprinter
- Mario Fortunato (c. 1905–1970), Argentine footballer and manager
- Mario Franke (born 1968), German gymnast
- Mario Fraschini (1938–1983), Italian sprinter
- Mário Freitas (born 1990), Portuguese futsal player
- Mario Frustalupi (1942–1990), Italian footballer
- Mario Fuchs (born 1976), Austrian snowboarder
- Mario Fuentes (born 1986), Spanish football manager
- Mario Galento (1915–1989), American wrestler
- Mario Galindo (born 1951), Chilean footballer
- Mario Galinović (born 1976), Croatian footballer
- Mário Galvão (1916–?), Portuguese footballer
- Mario Gamper (born 1999), Austrian cyclist
- Mario Garba (born 1977), Croatian footballer
- Mário Gardelli, Brazilian football referee
- Mario Gargiulo (born 1996), Italian footballer
- Mario Garín (born 1992), Spanish field hockey player
- Mario Gaspar (born 1990), Spanish footballer
- Mario Gavranović (born 1989), Swiss football player
- Mario Gayraud (born 1957), Argentine racing driver
- Mario Gelli (born 1957), Italian long-distance runner
- Mario Genta (1912–1993), Italian footballer
- Mario Gerosa (born 1967), Argentine rugby union player
- Mario Gestri (1924–1953), Italian cyclist
- Mario Geudens (born 1975), Belgian snooker player
- Mario Ghella (1929–2020), Italian cyclist
- Mario Giaccone (born 1945), Italian cyclist
- Mario Giallonardo (born 1957), Canadian ice hockey player
- Mario Giambielli (1897–?), Italian weightlifter
- Mario Giannelli (1920–2003), American football player
- Mario Gianni (1902–1967), Italian footballer and manager
- Mario Gigena (born 1977), Italian basketball player
- Mario Gila (born 2000), Spanish footballer
- Mario Gimeno (born 1969), Spanish footballer
- Mario Gios (born 1936), Italian speed skater
- Mario Giralt, Spanish footballer
- Mario Giubertoni (born 1945), Italian footballer
- Mario Gjata (born 2000), Albanian footballer
- Mario Gjurovski (born 1985), Macedonian football manager
- Mário Gomes (born 1957), Portuguese basketball coach
- Mario Gonsierowski (born 1956), German sports shooter
- Mario Goodrich (born 2000), American football player
- Mario Götze (born 1992), German footballer
- Mario Grana (born 1973), Argentine footballer
- Mario Grava (born 1941), French footballer
- Mario Gregurina (born 1988), Croatian footballer
- Mario Grgić (born 1991), Bosnian-Herzegovinian and Austrian footballer
- Mario Grgurović (born 1985), Croatian footballer
- Mario Griguol (born 1937), Argentine footballer and coach
- Mario Gross, Swiss male curler and coach
- Mario Gruppioni (1901–1939), Italian wrestler
- Mario Guerci (1913–1990), Argentine rower
- Mario Guerrero (1949–2023), Dominican baseball player
- Mario Guevara (born 1971), Salvadoran footballer
- Mario Guilloti (1946–2021), Argentine boxer
- Mario Gurma (born 1982), Albanian footballer
- Mario Gyr (born 1985), Swiss rower
- Mario Haas (born 1974), Austrian footballer
- Mário Haberfeld (born 1976), Brazilian racing driver
- Mario Hada (born 1952), Bolivian alpine skier
- Mario Haggan (born 1980), American football player
- Mario Harte (born 1988), Barbadian footballer
- Mario Harvey (born 1987), American football player
- Mario He (born 1993), Austrian professional pool player
- Mario Henderson (1984–2020), American football player
- Mário Henrique (born 1980), Brazilian football coach
- Mario Heredia (born 1992), Mexican boxer
- Mario Hermoso (born 1995), Spanish footballer
- Mario Herrera (born 1997), American boxer
- Mario Hezonja (born 1995), Croatian basketball player
- Mario Hieblinger (born 1977), Austrian footballer
- Mário Hipólito (born 1985), Angolan footballer
- Mario Hochberg (born 1970), German Paralympic weightlifter
- Mario Hodžić (born 1998), Montenegrin karateka
- Mario Hohn (born 1989), German footballer
- Mario Holek (born 1986), Czech footballer
- Mario Hollands (born 1988), American baseball player
- Mário Hollý (born 2000), Slovak footballer
- Mario Hopenhaym (1926–2016), Uruguayan basketball referee
- Mario Hoyer (born 1965), East German bobsledder
- Mario Husillos (born 1959), Argentine footballer and manager
- Mario Huys (born 1959), Belgian triathlete
- Mario Hytten (born 1957), Swiss racing driver
- Mario Ibáñez (1921–2004), Chilean footballer
- Mario Ielpo (born 1963), Italian footballer
- Mario Ierardi (born 1998), Italian footballer
- Mario Ilich (born 1995), New Zealand football player
- Mario Ilievski (born 2002), Macedonian footballer
- Mario Inchausti (1915–2006), Cuban footballer
- Mario Innauer (born 1990), Austrian ski jumper
- Mario Iubini (born 1954), Chilean footballer
- Mario Ivanković (born 1975), Bosnian and Croatian football manager
- Mario Ivov (born 1999), Bulgarian footballer
- Mario Jacobo (born 1996), Salvadoran footballer
- Mario Jann (born 1980), German ice hockey player
- Mario Jara (born 1970), Argentine football manager
- Mário Jardel (born 1973), Brazilian footballer
- Mario Jardel (footballer, born 2000), Indonesian footballer
- Mario Jelavić (born 1993), Croatian footballer
- Mario Jermen (born 1975), Australian soccer player
- Mario Jiménez (born 2007), Spanish footballer
- Mario Jozić (born 1972), Croatian footballer
- Mário Juliato (born 1944), Brazilian footballer and coach
- Mario Jurčević (born 1995), Slovenian footballer
- Mario Jurić (born 1976), Bosnian-Herzegovinian football player
- Mario Kägi (born 1967), Swiss footballer
- Mario Kalinke (born 1974), German weightlifter
- Mario Kargl (born 1986), Austrian tennis player
- Mario Karlović (born 1984), Australian tennis player
- Mario Kasun (born 1980), Croatian basketball player
- Mario Kelentrić (born 1973), Croatian handball player
- Mario Kempe (born 1988), Swedish ice hockey player
- Mario Kempes (born 1954), Argentine retired footballer
- Mario Kern (born 1969), German footballer
- Mario Kienzl (born 1983), Austrian footballer
- Mario Killer (born 1951), Argentine footballer
- Mario Kindelán (born 1971), Cuban boxer
- Mario Kirev (born 1989), Bulgarian footballer
- Mario Klinger (born 1986), German footballer
- Mario Knögler (born 1979), Austrian sports shooter
- Mario Konrad (born 1983), Austrian footballer
- Mario Kontny (1953–2024), German footballer
- Mario Konzett (born 1962), Liechtenstein alpine skier
- Mario Kovačević (born 1975), Croatian association football manager and former player
- Mario Kröpfl (footballer, born 1991), Austrian footballer
- Mario Kröpfl (born 1989), Austrian association footballer
- Mario Krstovski (born 1998), Macedonian footballer
- Mario Kummer (born 1962), German track and road cyclist and manager
- Mário Kurák (born 1983), Slovak footballer
- Mário Kurali (born 1992), Slovak ice hockey defenseman
- Mario Kvesić (born 1992), Bosnian footballer
- Mario Lambrughi (born 1992), Italian hurdler
- Mario Lamé (born 1966), Uruguayan rugby union coach and former player
- Mario Lamoureux (born 1988), American professional ice hockey forward
- Mario Landino (born 2006), American football player
- Mario Lara (born 1966), Spanish cyclist
- Mario Larenas (born 1994), Chilean footballer
- Mario Larocque (born 1978), Canadian ice hockey player
- Mario Larramendi (born 1984), Uruguayan footballer
- Mario Ledesma (born 1973), Argentine rugby coach and former player
- Mario Lega (born 1949), Italian motorcycle racer
- Mario Lega (athlete) (born 1957), Italian long jumper
- Mario Leguizamón (born 1982), Uruguayan footballer
- Mario Leite Neto (1931–1979), Brazilian equestrian
- Mario Leitgeb (born 1988), Austrian footballer
- Mario Leitner (born 1997), Austrian slalom canoeist
- Mario Lemieux (born 1965), Canadian ice hockey player
- Mario Lemina (born 1993), Gabonese footballer
- Mário Lemos (born 1986), Portuguese footballer
- Mario Lepe (born 1965), Chilean footballer
- Mario Lertora (1897–1939), Italian artistic gymnast
- Mario Lessard (born 1954), Canadian ice hockey player
- Mario Leuenberg (1923–?), Chilean equestrian
- Mario Lička (born 1982), Czech footballer
- Mario Liebers (born 1960), German former competitive figure skater
- Mário Lino (born 1937), Portuguese footballer and manager
- Mario Lisson (born 1984), Venezuelan baseball player
- Mario Little (born 1987), American basketball player
- Mario Llamas (1928–2014), Mexican tennis player
- Mario Llanos (born 1989), Colombian footballer
- Mario Lloret (born 1957), Spanish swimmer
- Mario Humberto Lobo (born 1964), Argentine footballer
- Mario Loch (born 1969), German boxer
- Mário Loja (born 1977), Portuguese footballer
- Mario Londok (born 1997), Indonesian footballer
- Mario Longo (born 1964), Italian sprinter
- Mario Longo (soccer) (born 1980), American soccer player
- Mario de Lorenzo (1912–?), Brazilian water polo player
- Mario Lösch (born 1989), Austrian footballer
- Mario Sérgio Lotufo (born 1960), Brazilian water polo player
- Mario Lucca (born 1961), Argentine footballer
- Mario Lučić (born 1981), Croatian footballer
- Mário Lúcio (born 1989), Brazilian footballer
- Mario de Luis (born 2002), Spanish footballer
- Mario de Luna (born 1988), Mexican footballer
- Mario Luna (born 1958), Argentine professional footballer and manager
- Mário Lunter (born 1994), Slovak ice hockey player
- Mario Lusiani (1903–1964), Italian cyclist
- Mario Macchiati (born 1999), Italian artistic gymnast
- Mario Macea (born 1982), Colombian footballer
- Mario Antonio Macias (born 1985), Mexican boxer
- Mario Maek (born 1964), German footballer and manager
- Mario Magnozzi (1902–1971), Italian footballer and manager
- Mario Maiocchi (1913–1996), Italian ice hockey player
- Mario Maire (born 1935), Argentine rower
- Mario Majoni (1910–1985), Italian water polo player
- Mario Majstorović (born 1977), Austrian footballer
- Mario Maldonado (born 1949), Chilean footballer and manager
- Mario Maloča (born 1989), Croatian footballer
- Mario Mancini (born 1966), American professional wrestler
- Mario Mandžukić (born 1986), Croatian footballer
- Mario Mangiarotti (1920–2019), Italian fencer
- Mario Manningham (born 1986), American football player
- Mario Mansilla Díez (born 2002), Spanish tennis player
- Mario Mantovan (born 1965), Italian cyclist
- Mario Manzoni (born 1969), Italian cyclist
- Mario Maraschi (1939–2020), Italian footballer and manager
- Mario Marchegiani (1917–1998), Italian footballer
- Mario Marchiori (1928–2010), Italian hockey player
- Mario Marina (born 1989), Croatian footballer
- Mario Marinică (born 1964), Romanian footballer and manager
- Mario Markaj (born 1995), Albanian footballer
- Mario Marois (born 1957), Canadian former ice hockey defenseman
- Mario Maroto (born 2003), Spanish footballer
- Mario Marques (athlete) (1909–?), Brazilian sprinter
- Mário Marques (1901–1989), Portuguese swimmer
- Mário Marques (footballer) (born 1957), Brazilian footballer
- Mario Martín (born 2004), Spanish footballer
- Mario Martiradonna (1938–2011), Italian footballer
- Mario Martos (born 1991), Spanish footballer
- Mario Masanés (1927–c. 1979), Chilean cyclist
- Mario Maslać (born 1990), Serbian footballer
- Mario Massa (1892–1956), Italian swimmer
- Mario Mataja (born 1967), Bosnian-Herzegovinian footballer
- Mário Mateus (born 1992), Portuguese footballer
- Mario Mathieu (1917–1999), Argentine cyclist
- Mario Matic (born 1994), Norwegian handball player
- Mário Matos (born 1988), Portuguese footballer
- Mario Matt (born 1979), Austrian alpine skier
- Mario Mattioli (1945–2003), Italian volleyball player
- Mário Maurity (1883–1922), Brazilian sports shooter
- Mario Mayén Meza (born 1978), Salvadoran footballer
- Mario Mazzacurati (1903–1985), Italian racing driver
- Mario Mazzoni (1931–2019), Italian footballer and manager
- Mario McCutcheon, American artistic gymnast
- Mario Medda (1943–1981), Italian modern pentathlete
- Mario Medina (born 1952), Mexican footballer
- Mario Medina (cyclist) (born 1958), Venezuelan cyclist
- Mario Melchiori, Italian rower
- Mario Melchiot (born 1976), Dutch footballer
- Mario Mena (1927–2013), Bolivian footballer
- Mário Mendonça (born 1991), Portuguese footballer
- Mario Mendoza (born 1950), Mexican baseball player
- Mario Mendoza (boxer) (born 1938), Guatemalan boxer
- Mario Mendoza (weightlifter) (born 1943), Belizean weightlifter
- Mario Rubén Mendoza (born 1949), Argentine footballer
- Mario Meneghetti (1893–1942), Italian footballer
- Mario Mercado (born 1995), Colombian racquetball player
- Mario Mereghetti (born 1938), Italian footballer
- Mario Meštrović (born 1970), Croatian footballer
- Mario Metushev (born 1979), Bulgarian footballer
- Mario Meza (born 1990), Mexican baseball player
- Mario Miethig (born 1961), German footballer
- Mario Mihai (born 1999), Romanian footballer
- Mário Mihál (born 2001), Slovak footballer
- Mario Mijatović (born 1980), Croatian footballer
- Mário Milani (1918–2003), Brazilian footballer
- Mario Milano (1935–2016), Italian professional wrestler
- Mario Miltone (1906–1976), Italian footballer
- Mario Minai (1912–1982), Hungarian sprinter
- Mario Minatelli (1925–1990), Italian boxer
- Mario Minieri (1938–2022), Italian cyclist
- Mario Miradji (born 1984), Malagasy footballer
- Mario Miranda (born 1960), Colombian boxer
- Mario Mitaj (born 2003), Albanian footballer
- Mario Mitoi (born 2004), Romanian footballer
- Mario Mladenovski (born 2000), Macedonian footballer
- Mário Moinhos (1949–2023), Portuguese footballer
- Mario Mola (born 1990), Spanish triathlete
- Mario Molina (born 1944), Chilean boxer
- Mario Monds (born 1976), American football player
- Mario Monge (born 1938), Salvadoran footballer
- Mario Mongelli (born 1958), French football player and manager
- Mario Montesanto (1909–1987), Italian footballer
- Mario Monticelli (1902–1995), Italian chess player
- Mario Moraes (born 1988), Brazilian racing driver
- Mario Morales (born 1957), Puerto Rican basketball player
- Mario Moretti (1906–1977), Italian rower
- Mario Morina (born 1992), Albanian footballer
- Mario Morra (born 1953), Canadian snooker and pool player
- Mario Mosböck (born 1996), Austrian footballer
- Mario Moscatelli (born 1963), Swiss footballer
- Mário Mourão (1924–c. 1994), Portuguese fencer
- Mário Mrva (born 1999), Slovak footballer
- Mario Müller (born 1992), German footballer
- Mario Muñoz (born 1984), Colombian footballer
- Mario Murillo (1927–2012), Costa Rican footballer
- Mario Musa (born 1990), Croatian professional footballer
- Mario Muscat (born 1976), Maltese football goalkeeper
- Mario Mustapić (born 1999), Croatian footballer
- Mario Mutsch (born 1984), Luxembourgish footballer
- Mario Mylius (1912–1980), Swiss equestrian
- Mario Nakić (born 2001), Serbian-Croatian basketball player
- Mario Napolitano (1910–1995), Italian chess player
- Mário Narciso (born 1953), Portuguese footballer
- Márió Németh (born 1995), Hungarian footballer
- Mario Neunaber (born 1982), German footballer
- Mario Neves (born 1979), Cape Verdean-tuguese basketball player
- Mario Noce (born 1999), Italian footballer
- Mario Noremberg (born 1962), Argentine footballer
- Mario Noris (born 1958), Italian racing cyclist
- Mário de Noronha (1885–1973), Portuguese fencer
- Mario Notaro (born 1950), Belgian football manager
- Mario Novaković (born 1969), Croatian footballer
- Mario Novelli (1913–1964), Italian basketball player
- Mario Núñez (born 1976), Chilean footballer
- Mário de Oliveira (1923–1998), Brazilian footballer
- Mario Olivier (born 1982), South African cricketer
- Mario Orozco (born 1994), Mexican footballer
- Mario Orta (born 1967), Uruguayan footballer
- Mario Osbén (1950–2021), Chilean footballer
- Mario Osibov (born 1973), Croatian footballer
- Mário Ostrčil (born 1978), Slovak canoeist
- Mario Osuna (born 1988), Mexican footballer
- Mario Pacheco (born 1969), Mexican tennis player
- Mario Pacilli (born 1987), Italian footballer
- Mario Padilla (born 1985), Mexican footballer
- Mario Paglialunga (born 1988), Argentine footballer
- Mario Pagotto (1911–1992), Italian footballer
- Mario Pallua, Italian bobsledder
- Mário Palma (born 1950), Portuguese basketball coach
- Mário Palmeira (born 1989), Portuguese footballer
- Mario Palmisano (born 1978), Italian rower
- Mario Pani (born 1936), Mexican sports shooter
- Mario Paonessa (born 1990), Italian rower
- Mario Pašalić (born 1995), Croatian footballer
- Mario Passani (1891–1981), Spanish footballer
- Mario Pavelić (born 1993), Austrian footballer
- Mario Pavin (born 1958), Italian rugby union player and coach
- Mário Pečalka (born 1980), Slovak footballer
- Mario Pedraza (born 1973), Cuban footballer
- Mario Pedretti (born 1948), Italian sprint canoeist
- Mario Penagos (born 2002), American soccer player
- Mario Perazzolo (1911–2001), Italian footballer
- Mario Peretti (born 1943), Argentine athlete
- Mario Perrone (born 2003), Italian footballer
- Mario Perry (born 1963), American football player
- Mario Pestano (born 1978), Spanish discus thrower
- Mario Petkov (born 1996), Bulgarian footballer
- Mario Petri (born 1939), Italian rower
- Mario Petrone (born 1973), Italian football manager
- Mario Piacenza (1884–1957), Italian mountain climber
- Mario Piccinocchi (born 1995), Italian footballer
- Mario Picone (1926–2013), American baseball player
- Mario Pierani (born 1978), Argentine footballer
- Mario Pietruzzi (1918–2014), Italian footballer and manager
- Mario Pinedo (born 1964), Bolivian footballer
- Mario Pineida (1992–2025), Ecuadorian footballer
- Mario Pini (1938–2021), Uruguayan footballer
- Mario G. Pino (born 1961), American jockey
- Mario Pipoș (born 2001), Romanian professional footballer
- Mario Pizziolo (1909–1990), Italian footballer
- Mario Pokar (born 1990), German footballer
- Mario Pollhammer (born 1989), Austrian footballer
- Mario Pomposi (1902–?), Italian cyclist
- Mario Pons (born 1967), Ecuadorian cyclist
- Mario Porter (born 1980), American basketball player
- Mario Posch (born 1967), Austrian footballer and coach
- Mario Pouliot (born 1963), Canadian ice hockey coach
- Mario Preisig (born 1954), Swiss footballer
- Mario Preskar (born 1984), Croatian boxer
- Mario Pretto (1915–1984), Italian footballer and manager
- Mario Prezioso (born 1996), Italian footballer
- Mario Primorac (born 1961), Bosnian-Herzegovinian baseball player
- Mario Prišć (born 1974), Croatian footballer
- Mário Procopio (born 1948), Brazilian volleyball player
- Mario Prosperi (born 1945), Swiss footballer
- Mario Puchoz (1918–1954), Italian mountaineer and guide
- Mario Pufek (born 1985), Croatian professional football player
- Mario Pugliese (born 1996), Italian footballer
- Mario Quezada (born 1992), Mexican footballer
- Mário Quina (1930–2017), Portuguese sailor
- Mario Quiñones (born 1979), Chilean footballer
- Mario Quintero (1924–2017), Cuban basketball player
- Mario Rabaglino (1910–1991), Italian sprinter
- Mario Rabiu (born 2000), Nigerian footballer
- Mario Radaelli (1912–?), Italian hurdler
- Mario Raimondi (born 1980), Swiss footballer
- Mario Ramos (born 1977), American baseball player
- Mario Rampersaud (born 1992), Barbadian cricketer
- Mario Rašić (born 1989), Croatian footballer
- Mario Ravagnan (1930–2006), Italian fencer
- Mario Ravasio (born 1998), Italian footballer
- Mario Rebecchi (born 1983), Italian footballer
- Mario Rebollo (born 1964), Uruguayan footballer
- Mario Regueiro (born 1978), Uruguayan footballer
- Mario Reilly (1905–?), Argentine boxer
- Mario Reiter (footballer) (born 1986), Austrian footballer
- Mario Reiter (born 1970), Austrian alpine skier
- Mario Relmy (born 1960), Guadeloupean footballer
- Mario Renosto (1929–1988), Italian footballer
- Mario Ricci (1914–2005), Italian cyclist
- Mario Riccoboni (1889–1968), Italian sprinter
- Mario Rigamonti (1922–1949), Italian footballer
- Mario Rinaldi (born 1966), Italian motorcycle racer
- Mario Rincón (born 1967), Colombian tennis player
- Mario Risso (born 1988), Uruguayan footballer
- Mario Rivas, multiple people
- Mario Rivillos Plaza (born 1989), Spanish futsal player
- Mario Rizotto (born 1984), Uruguayan footballer
- Mario Robbe (born 1973), Dutch darts player
- Mario Roberge (born 1964), Canadian ice hockey player
- Mario Rojas (1941–2018), Bolivian footballer
- Mario Rokhmanto (born 1992), Indonesian footballer
- Mario Romancini (born 1987), Brazilian racing driver
- Mario Romani (1907–1977), Italian footballer
- Mario Romeo (1915–c. 1992), Italian pole vaulter
- Mario Rondón (born 1986), Venezuelan footballer
- Mário da Rosa, Portuguese footballer
- Mario Rosas (born 1980), Spanish footballer and manager
- Mario Rosas (athlete) (born 1927), Colombian sprinter
- Mario Röser (born 1966), German footballer
- Mario Rottaris (born 1968), Swiss ice hockey player
- Mário Rui (born 1925), Portuguese footballer
- Mário Rui (born 1991), Portuguese footballer
- Mario Ruyales (born 1984), Spanish footballer
- Mario Sabatini (born 1943), German wrestler
- Mário Sabino (1972–2019), Brazilian judoka
- Mario Saccone (born 1970), Argentine footballer
- Mario Sačer (born 1990), Croatian footballer
- Mario Sagario (born 1986), Uruguayan rugby union player
- Mario Saint-Supéry (born 2006), Spanish basketball player
- Mario Salani (born 1966), Italian yacht racer
- Mario Saldívar (born 1990), Paraguayan footballer
- Mario Salgado (born 1981), Chilean footballer
- Mario Sampirisi (born 1992), Italian footballer
- Mario Sandoval (born 1991,) Chilean footballer
- Mario Santamaria (born 1950), Nicaraguan boxer
- Mario Santana (born 1981), Argentine footballer
- Mario Santiago (born 1978), Puerto Rican boxer
- Mario Santiago (baseball) (born 1984), Puerto Rican baseball player
- Mario Santibáñez (born 1950), Mexican swimmer
- Mario Santillán (born 1981), Mexican Paralympic athlete
- Mario Santilli (born 1984), Argentine footballer
- Mario Santos de Matos (born 1988), Belgian footballer
- Mário dos Santos (born 1979), Brazilian racewalker
- Mario Sara (born 1982), Austrian footballer
- Mario Saralegui (born 1959), Uruguayan footballer and manager
- Mario de Sárraga (born 1980), Spanish cyclist
- Mário Sauer (born 2004), Slovak footballer player
- Mario Scalzo (born 1984), Canadian ice hockey player
- Mario Scapini (born 1989), Italian middle-distance runner
- Mario Schaden (born 1972), Austrian ice hockey player
- Mario Scheiber (born 1983), Austrian alpine skier
- Mario Schembri (Maltese footballer, born 1950)
- Mario Schembri (Maltese footballer, born 1956)
- Mario Schönenberger (born 1986), Swiss footballer
- Mario Schujovitzky (1953–2021), Argentinian-Israeli footballer
- Mario Sciacqua (born 1970), Argentine footballer and manager
- Mario Scirea (born 1964), Italian cyclist
- Mario Sebastián (1926–2006), Argentine water polo player
- Mario Seidl (born 1992), Austrian Nordic combined skier
- Mário Seixas (1902–?), Brazilian footballer
- Mario Semenzato (born 1950), Italian rower
- Mario Sesé (born 2002), Spanish footballer
- Mario Shabow (born 1998), Australian professional soccer player
- Mário da Silva Pedreira Júnior (born 1982), Brazilian volleyball player
- Mário Simas (1922–2015), Portuguese swimmer
- Mario Šimić (born 1989), Croatian footballer
- Mario Simioni (born 1963), Canadian-Italian ice hockey player and coach
- Mario Simón (born 1981), Spanish football manager
- Mario Simunovic (born 1989), Swedish footballer
- Mario Sitri (1936–2011), Italian boxer
- Mario Šitum (born 1992), Croatian footballer
- Mario Soares (born 1967), Indian footballer and coach
- Mario Soberón (born 1997), Spanish footballer
- Mario Solomons (born 1971), South African cricketer
- Mario Somma (born 1963), Italian footballer and manager
- Mario Sonnleitner (born 1986), Austrian footballer
- Mario Soriano (born 2002), Spanish footballer
- Mario Sosa, Cuban footballer
- Mario Šoštarić (born 1992), Slovenian handball player
- Mario Souto (born 1960), Brazilian water polo player
- Mario Sperone (1905–1975), Italian footballer
- Mario Sperry (born 1966), Brazilian heavyweight martial artist
- Mario Stancanelli (born 1977), Italian footballer
- Mario Stanić (born 1972), Croatian footballer
- Mario Stecher (born 1977), Austrian Nordic combined skier
- Mario Stefel (born 1996), Austrian footballer
- Mario Steiner (born 1982), Austrian footballer
- Mario Stojić (born 1980), Croatian basketball player
- Mario Streit (born 1967), East German rower
- Mario Stroeykens (born 2004), Belgian footballer
- Mario Subarić (born 2000), Croatian footballer
- Mario Šuver (born 1999), Croatian footballer
- Mario Swaby (born 1982), Jamaican footballer
- Mario Szlafmyc (born 1989), Uruguayan football manager
- Mario Tabares (born 1965), Cuban tennis player
- Mario Tabio (born 1942), Cuban rower
- Mario Tadejević (born 1989), Croatian footballer
- Mario Talavera (born 1972), Spanish Paralympic judoka
- Mario Tambini (1892–1973), Italian gymnast
- Mario Tankoski (born 1998), Macedonian handball player
- Mario Tenorio (born 1957), Ecuadorian footballer
- Mario Theissen (born 1952), German Motorsport engineer
- Mario Thyer (born 1966), Canadian ice hockey player
- Mario Tičinović (born 1991), Croatian footballer
- Mário Tilico (born 1968), Brazilian footballer
- Mário Tilico (1942–2019), Brazilian footballer
- Mário Tito (1941–1997), Brazilian footballer
- Mario Titone (born 1988), Italian footballer
- Mario Tiziani (born 1970), American professional golfer
- Mario Todorović (born 1988), Croatian swimmer
- Mario Tokić (born 1975), Croatian footballer and manager
- Mario Tolkmitt (born 1970), German footballer
- Mario Tonelli (1916–2003), American football player
- Mario Tontodonati (1923–2009), Italian footballer
- Mario Tortul (1931–2008), Italian footballer and manager
- Mario Tosato (1930–1996), Italian cyclist
- Mário Tóth (born 1995), Slovak footballer
- Mario Trafeli (1928–2022), Italian-American speed skater
- Mário Travaglini (1932–2014), Brazilian footballer and manager
- Mario Traversoni (born 1972), Italian cyclist
- Mario Traxl (born 1964), Austrian cyclist
- Mario Trebbi (1939–2018), Italian footballer and manager
- Mario Tremblay (born 1956), Canadian professional ice hockey player and coach
- Mario Trevisiol, German curler
- Mario Trimeri, Italian mountaineer
- Mário Trindade (born 1975), Portuguese Paralympic sprinter
- Mario Tuane (1927–2017), Chilean football manager
- Mario Tudor (born 1978), Croatian tennis player
- Mario Turco (born 1956), Australian rules footballer
- Mario Turdó (born 1979), Argentine footballer
- Mario Turner (born 1951), Italian equestrian
- Mario Uccella (born 1966), Italian footballer
- Mario Uriburu (1901–1984), Argentine sailor
- Mario Urrutia (born 1986), American gridiron football player and executive
- Mario Ustolin (1924–2006), Italian rower
- Mario Vaiani-Lisi (born 1950), Italian long-distance runner
- Mario Valenzuela (born 1977), Mexican baseball player
- Mario Valery-Trabucco (born 1987), Canadian ice hockey player
- Mario Valles (born 1982), Colombian judoka
- Mario Vallotto (1933–1966), Italian cyclist
- Mario Valota (1918–2000), Swiss fencer
- Mario Vandenbogaerde (born 1973), Belgian darts player
- Mario Vanegas (born 1939), Colombian cyclist
- Mario Vanemerak (born 1963), Argentine footballer and manager
- Mario Varas (born 1951), Chilean footballer
- Mario Varglien (1905–1978), Italian footballer and manager
- Mario Vascellari (1951–2021), Italian basketball player
- Mario Vasilj (born 1983), Swedish footballer
- Mario Vecchi (born 1957), Italian judoka
- Mario Vecchiato (born 1948), Italian hammer thrower
- Mario Veit (born 1973), German boxer
- Mario Veitía, Cuban baseball player
- Mario Vekić (born 1982), Croatian rower
- Mario Véner (born 1964), Argentine-Chilean footballer and coach
- Mario Ventimiglia (1921–2005), Italian footballer, manager and chairman
- Mario Ventura (born 1974), Jamaican cricketer
- Mario Vera (born 1940), Chilean alpine skier
- Mario Verduzco, American football coach
- Mario Vernon-Watson (born 1971), Jamaican middle-distance runner
- Mario Verzeletti (1893–?), Italian cyclist
- Mário Vianna (1902–1989), Brazilian football referee
- Mario Vicini (1913–1995), Italian cyclist
- Mario Videla (born 1962), Argentine footballer
- Mario Viens (born 1955), Canadian ice hockey player
- Mario Viera (born 1959), Uruguayan footballer and manager
- Mario Villagran (born 1986), Mexican professional wrestler
- Mario Villamizar (born 1995), Canadian gridiron football player
- Mario Villasanti (born 1982), Paraguayan footballer
- Mario Villavarayan (born 1973), Sri Lankan cricketer
- Mario Visconti (born 1968), Italian tennis player
- Mario Vitali (1914–1979), Italian bobsledder
- Mario Vogt (born 1992), German cyclist
- Mario Von Appen (born 1965), German sprint canoeist
- Mario Vrančić (born 1989), Bosnian footballer
- Mario Vrdoljak (born 1993), Croatian footballer
- Mario Vucenovic (born 1999), Austrian association football player
- Mario Vušković (born 2001), Croatian footballer
- Mario Vušković (footballer, born 1953) (1953–1985), Croatian footballer
- Mario Walsh (born 1966), English footballer
- Mario Watts (born 1975), Jamaican sprinter
- Mario West (born 1984), American basketball player
- Mario Westbroek (born 1961), Dutch sprinter
- Mario Williams (born 1985), American football player
- Mario Williams (wide receiver) (born 2003), American football player
- Mário Wilson (1929–2016), Portuguese footballer
- Mario Wuysang (born 1979), Indonesian-American basketball player
- Mario Yamasaki (born 1964), Brazilian mixed martial arts referee
- Mario Yáñez (born 1993), Mexican squash player
- Mario Yepes (born 1976), Colombian footballer
- Mario Zabalaga (1938–2008), Bolivian footballer
- Mário Zagallo (1931–2024), Brazilian footballer and coach
- Mario Zanabria (born 1948), Argentine former football player
- Mario Zanchi (1939–1976), Italian cyclist
- Mario Zanello (1903–1981), Italian footballer and manager
- Mario Zaninovic (born 1987), Argentine professional footballer
- Mario Zapata Vinces (1920–?), Peruvian chess player
- Mario Zatelli (1912–2004), French footballer
- Mário Zavaterník (born 1978), Slovak footballer
- Mario Zebić (born 1995), Croatian footballer
- Márió Zeke (born 2000), Hungarian footballer
- Mario Zoryez (born 1950), Uruguayan footballer
- Mario Zorzan (1912–1973), Italian footballer
- Mario Zorzi (1910–1944), Italian sports shooter
- Mario Zucchini (1910–1997), Italian ice hockey player
- Mario Župetić (born 1983), Croatian footballer
- Mario Zurlini (1942–2023), Italian footballer

=== Others ===
- Mario Acevedo (born 1955), American novelist and artist
- Mario Arturo Acosta Chaparro (1942–2012), Mexican general
- Mario Acuña (1940–2009), Argentine astrophysicist
- Mario Adrion (born 1994), German-American social media personality and model
- Mario Ageno (1915–1992), Italian biophysicist
- Mario Agliati (1922–2011), Swiss writer, journalist and historian
- Mario Agnes (1931–2018), Italian journalist
- Mario Agustín Gaspar (born 1950), Mexican artisan
- Mario Ajmone Cat (1894–1952), Italian Air Force general
- Mario Alberizzi (1609–1680), Roman Catholic prelate
- Mario Alberti (born 1965), Italian comic book artist and writer
- Mário de Alencar (1872–1925), Brazilian writer
- Mario Aleppo (born 1989), British-Italian entrepreneur
- Mario Algaze (1947–2022), Cuban-American photojournalist
- Mario Alinei (1926–2018), Italian linguist
- Mario Allegretti (1919–1945), Italian partisan
- Mario Almondo, Italian engineer
- Mario Amendola (1910–1993), Italian screenwriter
- Mario Amzel (1942–2021), Argentine chemist/biophysicist
- Mário de Andrade (1893–1945), Brazilian writer, musicologist and photographer
- Mario Aramu (1900–1940), Italian aviator
- Mario Arillo (1912–2000), Italian naval officer
- Mario Arisio (1885–1950), Italian general
- Mario Arroyo, Gibraltarian poet
- Mario Alberto Avilés (born 1969), Mexican Catholic priest
- Mario Azevedo (born 1940), Mozambican historian
- Mario Bachand (1944–1971), Québécois nationalist
- Mario Badino Rossi (1887–1965), Italian general
- Mario Baeza (born 1951), American academic
- Mario Balotta (1886–1963), Italian general
- Mario Barbatti (born 1971), Brazilian chemist
- Mario Bardanca, Uruguayan sportscaster, journalist, radio personality and writer
- Mario Barros van Buren, Chilean historian and lawyer
- Mario Batali (born 1960), American chef
- Mario Baudoin (1942–2019), Bolivian biologist and conservationist
- Mario Luis Bautista Maulión (1934–2020), Argentine priest
- Mario Beauregard, Canadian cognitive neuroscientist
- Mario Belgrano (1884–1947), Argentine historian
- Mario Bellatin (born 1960), Mexican novelist
- Mario Bellini (born 1935), Italian architect and designer
- Mario Bellizzi, Italian poet
- Mario Benazzi (1902–1997), Italian zoologist
- Mario Bencastro, Salvadoran novelist and painter
- Mario Benedetti (1920–2009), Uruguayan journalist, novelist, and poet
- Mario Benedetti (Italian poet) (1955–2020), Italian poet and teacher
- Mario Berlinguer (1891–1969), Italian lawyer
- Mario de Bernardi (1893–1959), Italian pilot
- Mario Berti (1881–1960), Italian general
- Mario Bettinus (1582–1657), Italian mathematician, astronomer and philosopher
- Mario Bezzi (1868–1927), Italian entomologist
- Mario Biondi (born 1939), Italian writer
- Mario Bonetti (1888–1961), Italian admiral
- Mario Borrelli (1922–2007), Italian priest and sociologist
- Mario Botta (born 1943), Italian architect
- Mario Brelich (1910–1982), Hungarian-Italian author
- Mario Brero (born 1946), Swiss businessman
- Mario Brooks (born 1971), police commissioner of the USVI
- Mario J. Bruno, American Red Cross executive
- Mario Buatta (1935–2018), American interior decorator
- Mario Buda (1884–1963), Italian anarchist and American Galleanist
- Mario Buhagiar (1945–2026), Maltese art historian
- Mario Bunge (1919–2020), Argentine-Canadian philosopher
- Mario Cagna (1911–1986), Italian prelate
- Mario Calixto, Colombian human rights activist
- Mario Calvo-Platero (born 1954), Italian journalist
- Mario Capecchi (born 1937), Italian-American scientist
- Mario Caracciolo di Feroleto (1880–1954), Italian general
- Mario Carafa, 16th-century Roman Catholic prelate
- Mario Cardullo, American inventor
- Mario Antonio Cargnello (born 1952), Argentine clergyman
- Mario Carli (1889–1935), Italian poet, novelist, essayist and journalist
- Mario Carloni (1894–1962), Italian soldier
- Mario De Caro (born 1963), Italian philosopher
- Mario Carpo, Italian architectural historian
- Mario Casacci (1925–1995), Italian screenwriter
- Mario Casariego y Acevedo (1909–1983), Spanish-born Guatemalan cardinal
- Mario Casciaro, American lawyer
- Mario Roberto Cassari (1943–2017), Italian Roman Catholic archbishop and diplomat
- Mario Castoldi (1888–1968), Italian aircraft engineer and designer
- Mario Caterino (born 1957), Italian criminal
- Mario Cattabiani, American journalist
- Mario Cervi (1921–2015), Italian essayist and journalist
- Mário Cesariny de Vasconcelos (1923–2006), Portuguese poet
- Mario Chanes de Armas (1927–2007), Cuban revolutionary
- Mario Chiari (1909–1989), Italian production designer
- Mario J. Ciampi (1907–2006), American architect
- Mario Luigi Ciappi (1909–1996), Italian Cardinal of the Roman Catholic Church
- Mario Ciceri (1900–1945), Italian Catholic priest and Venerated Catholic
- Mário Clemente Neto (1940–2024), Brazilian Roman Catholic bishop
- Mário Coelho (1936–2020), Portuguese bullfighter
- Mario Conde (born 1948), Spanish businessman, banker, state lawyer and politician
- Mario Condello (1952–2006), Australian gangster
- Mario Conti (1934–2022), Scottish Roman Catholic prelate
- Mario Sergio Conti (born 1954), Brazilian journalist and writer
- Mario E. Cosenza (1880–1966), Italian educator
- Mario Cossa, 17th-century Catholic bishop
- Mário Crespo (born 1947), Portuguese journalist
- Mario Crocco, Argentine neurobiologist
- Mario Cuenca Sandoval, Spanish writer
- Mario de la Cueva (1901–1981), Mexican jurist and rector
- Mario Dal Pra (1914–1992), Italian philosopher
- Mario Davignon, Canadian costume designer
- Mario De Pillis (1926–2021), American historian
- Mario Delpini (born 1951), Italian Catholic archbishop
- Mario Deng, German-Chinese cardiologist
- Mario Anthony DeStefano (1915–1975), American mobster
- Mario Di Fiorino (born 1953), Italian psychiatrist
- Mario Diena (1891–1971), Italian philatelist
- Mario Dion, Canadian public servant
- Mario E. Dorsonville (1960–2024), Colombian-born American Catholic prelate
- Mario Dumaual (1958–2023), Filipino entertainment journalist
- Mario Einaudi, Italian political scientist
- Mario El-Khoury (born 1963), Lebanese-Swiss engineer and business executive
- Mário Roberto Emmett Anglim (1922–1973), American-born bishop
- Mario Equicola (c. 1470–1525), Italian renaissance humanist
- Mario Espinosa Contreras (born 1949), Mexican bishop
- Mario Fabbrocino (1943–2019), Italian crime boss
- Mario Fafangel, Slovenian epidemiologist
- Mario Falangola (1880–1967), Italian admiral
- Mario Falconi, Italian priest
- Mario Giulio Fara (1880–1949), Italian musicologist
- Mário Ferreira (born 1968), Portuguese businessman and entrepreneur
- Mário Ferreira dos Santos (1907–1968), Brazilian philosopher
- Mario Ferreiro (born 1959), Paraguayan television host and politician
- Mário Filho (1908–1966), Brazilian journalist and writer
- Mario Fiorentini (1918–2022), Italian partisan and spy
- Mario Firmenich (born 1948), Argentinian revolutionary and economist
- Mario Francese (1925–1979), Italian crime reporter
- Mario Fratti (1927–2023), Italian playwright
- Mario Frittoli (born 1966), Italian chef
- Mario Fucini (1891–1977), Italian World War I flying ace
- Mario Gabelli (born 1942), American billionaire businessman
- Mario Gandelsonas (born 1937), Argentinian-US architect
- Mario Garavaglia (born 1937), Argentine physicist
- Mario Garbuglia (1927–2010), Italian set designer
- Mario Gariazzo (1930–2002), Italian screenwriter
- Mário Garnero (born 1937), Brazilian banker
- Mario Pio Gaspari (1918–1983), Italian Roman Catholic priest
- Mario Gaudino, Italian doctor
- Mario Gerla (1943–2019), Italian computer scientist and engineer
- Mario Ghedina (1909–1974), Italian architect
- Mario Giardini (1877–1947), Italian prelate
- Mario Gigante (1923–2022), American mobster
- Mario Gioffredo (1718–1785), Italian architect
- Mario Giordana (born 1942), Italian archbishop
- Mario Giordano (writer) (born 1963), German writer
- Mario Giordano (born 1966), Italian journalist and writer
- Mario Giorgini (1900–1977), Italian naval officer during World War II
- Mario Giovinetto (1933–2024), Argentine-Canadian glaciologist
- Mario Giro (born 1958), Italian trade unionist
- Mario Girona (1924–2008), Cuban architect
- Mario Girotti (1885–1957), Italian Alpini general
- Mario Góngora (1915–1985), Chilean historian
- Mario Gordesco (1884–1920), Italian aviator
- Mario Grech (born 1957), Maltese Catholic Church
- Mario Greco (born 1959), Italian businessman
- Mario Gromo (1901–1960), Italian journalist, writer and film critic
- Mario Guarnacci (1701–1785), Italian archaeologist
- Mario Guiducci, Italian scholar and writer
- Mario Hamuy, Chilean astronomer
- Mario Herrero (born 1967), researcher
- Mario Hirsch (1949–2023), Luxembourgish political scientist and journalist
- Mario Hispanus, Italian Roman Catholic prelate
- Mario Iceta (born 1965), Spanish Catholic bishop
- Mario Illien (born 1949), Swiss motorsport engineer
- Mario Impemba (born 1963), American sports announcer
- Mario Jeckle (1974–2004), German computer scientist
- Mario Joseph (1962 or 1963–2025), Haitian lawyer
- Mario Jurić (born 1979), Croatian astronomer
- Mário Kertész (born 1944), Brazilian politician and radio host
- Mario Keßler (born 1955), German historian
- Mario Kopić (born 1965), Croatian philosopher
- Mario Kranjac, American lawyer, venture capitalist and politician
- Mario Labacco, Italian engraver
- Mario Armando Lavandeira Jr., better-known as Perez Hilton, American celebrity gossip blogger
- Mario Lessona (1855–1911), Italian zoologist
- Mario Levi (1957–2024), Turkish novelist and journalist
- Mario Liverani (born 1939), Italian historian and professor
- Mario Livio (born 1945), Romanian-born Israeli-American astrophysicist
- Mario Llerena (1913–2006), Cuban intellectual
- Mario Longhi, Brazilian-American businessman
- Mario de Loyola Furtado (1913–1946), Portuguese lawyer and journalist
- Mario Lozano, American soldier
- Mário Lucunde (1957–2023), Angolan bishop
- Mario Luzi (1914–2005), Italian poet
- Mario Machado (1935–2013), American journalist
- Mario Mactas (1944–2025), Argentinian journalist and writer
- Mario Magnotta (1942–2009), Italian janitor, Internet phenomenon
- Mario Maj, Italian psychiatrist and professor
- Mario Marazzani (1887–1969), Italian general
- Mario Markic (born 1953), Argentine journalist and writer
- Mario Markus (born 1944), Chilean physicist
- Mario Martino, trans male author
- Mario Mattei (1792–1870), Italian cardinal
- Mario Mazza (1882–1959), Italian educator
- Mario Meini (born 1946), Italian Catholic bishop
- Mario Mendoza Zambrano (born 1964), Colombian writer
- Mario Benjamín Menéndez (1930–2015), Argentinian military officer
- Mario Menéndez Rodríguez (1937–2024), Mexican journalist
- Mario Mieli (1952–1983), Italian activist
- Mario Miglietta (1925–1996), Italian Catholic archbishop
- Mario Milano (born 1936), Italian Catholic bishop
- Mario Millini (1677–1756), Roman Catholic cardinal
- Mario Mocenni (1823–1904), Italian cardinal
- Mario Molina (1943–2020), Mexican chemist
- Mario Montalbetti (born 1953), Peruvian academic
- Mario Monteforte Toledo (1911–2003), Guatemalan writer, dramatist and politician
- Mario Montejo, Filipino engineer and government administrator
- Mario Montoto (born 1956), Argentine businessman and politician
- Mario Moretti (born 1946), Italian terrorist and convicted murderer
- Mario Moretti Polegato (born 1952), Italian entrepreneur
- Mario Moronta (1949–2025), Venezuelan Roman Catholic bishop
- Mario Moya, American fashion designer
- Mario A. Murillo (born 1927), American journalist
- Mario Musolesi (1914–1944), Italian soldier
- Mario Nasalli Rocca di Corneliano (1903–1988), Italian cardinal
- Mario Nawfal (born 1994), Lebanese-Australian entrepreneur
- Mário Neves (1912–1999), Portuguese journalist and diplomat
- Mario Normore (born 1991), American serial killer
- Mario Nuzzolese (1915–2008), Italian journalist
- Mario Occhiuto (born 1964), Italian politician and architect
- Mario Oliveri (born 1944), Italian Catholic bishop
- Mario Orfeo (born 1966), Italian journalist
- Mario Oriani-Ambrosini (1960–2014), Italian lawyer and politician
- Mário Ottoboni (1931–2019), Brazilian journalist, writer, lawyer and creator of the APAC
- Mario Paciolla (1987–2020), Italian activist
- Mario Palanti (1885–1978), Italian architect
- Mario Pani (1911–1993), Mexican architect
- Mario Pantaleo (1915–1992), Italian priest
- Mario Pappagallo (1954–2022), Italian journalist and essayist
- Mario Parente, Canadian outlaw biker and gangster
- Mario Pascal (1896–1949), Italian mathematician
- Mario Pastega (1916–2012), American businessman
- Mario Pei (1901–1978), American linguist
- Mario Pennacchia (1928–2021), Italian sports journalist
- Mario Giacinto Peracca (1861–1923), Italian herpetologist
- Mario Pereyra (1943–2020), Argentine radio host and businessman
- Mario Pergolini (born 1964), Argentine journalist
- Mario Perillo (1926–2003), American businessman
- Mário A. Perini (born 1943), Brazilian linguist
- Mario Perniola (1941–2018), Italian philosopher
- Mario Pescante (born 1938), Italian politician and businessman
- Mario Petrucci, British poet, literary translator, educator and broadcaster
- Mario Pezzi (1898–1968), Italian aviator
- Mario Pieri (1860–1913), Italian mathematician
- Mario Pino Quivira (born 1952), Chilean geologist
- Mário Pinto de Andrade (1928–1990), Angolan poet and politician
- Mario Pirani (1925–2015), Italian journalist, economist and writer
- Mario Pirata (1957–2025), Brazilian writer
- Mario Aurelio Poli (born 1947), Catholic cardinal from Argentina
- Mario Francesco Pompedda (1929–2006), Italian cardinal
- Mario Ponzo (1882–1960), Italian psychologist
- Mario Prada, Italian designer
- Mario Praz (1896–1982), Italian critic and scholar
- Mario Prestifilippo (1958–1987), member of the Sicilian Mafia
- Mario Procaccino (1912–1995), American lawyer
- Mario Pulvirenti, Italian academician
- Mario Puzo (1920–1999), American author known chiefly for his novel The Godfather
- Mario Ludovico Quarini, Italian architect and writer
- Mário Quintana (1906–1994), Brazilian writer and translator
- Mario Quintero Lara, Mexican musician and philanthropist
- Mario R. Ramil (1946–2017), American judge
- Mario Rapisardi (1844–1912), Italian poet
- Mario Reading (c. 1953–2017), British author
- Mario Reali (1939–2017), Italian writer and poet
- Mario Revollo Bravo (1919–1995), Colombian prelate
- Mario Rigby (born 1985), Canadian-Turks and Caicos Islander adventure explorer, author and speaker
- Mario Andrea Rigoni (1948–2021), Italian writer
- Mario Rigoni Stern (1921–2008), Italian writer
- Mario Rizzetto (born 1945), Italian virologist
- Mario Rizzi (1926–2012), Italian titular archbishop and apostolic nuncio
- Mario Roatta (1887–1968), Italian general
- Mario Nicolis di Robilant (1855–1943), Italian general
- Mario Rocca, Italian experimental physicist
- Mario Rojzman, Argentine rabbi
- Mario Romañach (1917–1984), Cuban architect
- Mario Arnello Romo (born 1925), Chilean lawyer
- Mario Roques (1875–1961), French scholar
- Mario Rosa (1932–2022), Italian historian
- Mario Rosario Morelli (born 1941), Italian judge
- Mario J. Rossetti (1935–2014), American judge
- Mario Roy (1951–2022), Canadian journalist and editorialist
- Mario Rozas (born 1967), Chilean Carabineros officer
- Mario Ruben (born 1968), German chemist
- Mário Ruivo (1924–2017), Portuguese biologist
- Mario Runco Jr. (born 1952), American astronaut
- Mario Ruspoli, 2nd Prince of Poggio Suasa (1867–1963)
- Mario Russo (born 1967), Argentine cardiologist and civil servant
- Mario Russotto (born 1957), Roman Catholic bishop
- Mário de Sá-Carneiro (1890–1916), Portuguese poet and writer
- Mario Salcedo (born 1949 or 1950), a long-term passenger on Royal Caribbean International-branded cruise ships
- Mario Salieri, Italian porn director
- Mario Salmi (1889–1980), Italian art historian and art critic
- Mario Salvadori (1907–1997), American engineer and architect
- Mario Sassi, 17th-century Italian Catholic bishop
- Mario Satz, Spanish writer and poet
- Mario Scaramella (born 1970), Italian lawyer
- Mário Schenberg (1914–1990), Brazilian electrical engineer, physicist, art critic and writer
- Mario Schilling (born 1969), Chilean lawyer
- Mario Schjetnan (born 1945), Mexican architect
- Mario Sconcerti (1948–2022), Italian journalist
- Mario Segale (1934–2018), American real-estate agent of whom Nintendo's Mario character is named after
- Mario Sica (born 1936), Italian diplomat and scout
- Mário Rino Sivieri (1942–2020), Italian priest
- Mario Luis Small, sociologist
- Mario Soldarelli (1886–1962), Italian general during World War II
- Mario Soldati (1906–1999), Italian writer
- Mario Sossi (1932–2019), Italian magistrate and politician
- Mário Spaki (born 1971), Brazilian prelate of the Catholic Church
- Mario Spezi (1945–2016), Italian journalist and author
- Mario Stefani (1938–2001), Italian poet
- Mario Stevenazzi (born 1965), Uruguayan Army general
- Mario Stiebitz, German serial killer
- Mario Stoppani (1895–1959), Italian World War I flying ace
- Mario Sturzo (1861–1941), Italian Roman Catholic bishop
- Mario Alberto Sulú Canché (c. 1979–2008), Mexican serial killer
- Mario Szenessy (1930–1976), German writer
- Mario Taddei (born 1972), Italian academic
- Mario Tagarinski (born 1958), Bulgarian politician and engineer
- Mario Tagliaferri (1927–1999), Italian prelate
- Mario Tamagno (1877–1941), Italian architect
- Mario Tchou (1924–1961), Italian engineer
- Mario Teguh (born 1956), Indonesian businessman
- Mario Telò (1950–2023), Italian scholar
- Mario Terán (1942–2022), Bolivian army soldier
- Mario Theodoli (died 1650), Catholic cardinal
- Mario Tirelli, Italian entomologist
- Mario Tobino (1910–1991), Italian poet, writer and psychiatrist
- Mario Toffanin (1912–1999), Italian Communist partisan
- Mario Torelli (1937–2020), Italian archaeologist and art historian
- Mario Turchetti (1944–2021), Italian historian and academic
- Mario J. Valdés (1934–2020), literary scholar
- Mario Vargas Llosa (1936–2025), Peruvian novelist and writer
- Mario Vargas Vidal (born 1963), Chilean constituent
- Mario Vasquez (born 1977), American public administrator
- Mario Vázquez Raña (1932–2015), Mexican businessman
- Mario Vegetti (1937–2018), Italian historian
- Mario Veiga Ferraz Pereira (born 1953), Brazilian scientist and engineer
- Mario Vella, Maltese philosopher, economist and politician
- Mario Vercellino (1879–1961), Italian general
- Mario Verdial (1962–2015), Honduran businessman
- Mario Vergara (1910–1950), Italian Catholic priest
- Mário Vieira de Carvalho, Portuguese musicologist and author
- Mario Villarroel (born 1947), Venezuelan lawyer
- Mario Visintini (1913–1941), Italian military pilot
- Mario Vitti (1926–2023), Italian philologist
- Mário Wallace Simonsen (1909–1965), Brazilian businessman
- Mario Alberto Zambrano, American novelist
- Mario Zenari (born 1946), Italian prelate and Vatican diplomat

=== Disambiguation ===
- Mario Aguero, several people
- Mario Aguilar, several people
- Mario Almada, several people
- Mario Álvarez, several people
- Mario Benítez, several people
- Mario Bergara, several people
- Mario Bernasconi, several people
- Mario Berríos, several people
- Mario Bossi, several people
- Mário Campos, several people
- Mario Castro, several people
- Mario Cecchini, several people
- Mario Chiesa, several people
- Mario Coppola, several people
- Mario Corti, several people
- Mario Costa, several people
- Mario David, several people
- Mario De Grassi, several people
- Mário Delgado, several people
- Mario Díaz, several people
- Mario Domínguez, several people
- Mario Escobar, several people
- Mario Esposito, several people
- Mario Falcone, several people
- Mario Fernandes, several people
- Mario Fernández, several people
- Mario Flores, several people
- Mario Frick, several people
- Mario Gallo, several people
- Mario García, several people
- Mario Gentili, several people
- Mario Gómez, several people
- Mario González, several people
- Mario Gosselin, several people
- Mario Gutiérrez, several people
- Mario Hernández, several people
- Mário Jorge, several people
- Mario Kovač, several people
- Mario López, several people
- Mario Losada, several people
- Mario Marín, several people
- Mario Martinez, several people
- Mario Méndez, several people
- Mario Mendoza, several people
- Mario Merola, several people
- Mario Montano, several people
- Mario Montoya, several people
- Mario Moreno, several people
- Mario Ochoa, several people
- Mario Ortiz, several people
- Mario Pardo, several people
- Mario Peña, several people
- Mario Pérez, several people
- Mario Pezzi, several people
- Mario Radić, several people
- Mario Ramírez, several people
- Mário Reis, several people
- Mario Ríos, several people
- Mario Riquelme, several people
- Mario Rivas, several people
- Mario Rivera, several people
- Mario Rodríguez, several people
- Mario Romero, several people
- Mario Rossi, several people
- Mario Ruiz, several people
- Mario Salas, several people
- Mario Sanchez, several people
- Mario Sandoval, several people
- Mario Sergio, several people
- Mário Silva, several people
- Mario Soto, several people
- Mario Suárez, several people
- Mario Tomić, several people
- Mario Torres, several people
- Mario Trejo, several people
- Mario Valdez, several people
- Mario Vega, several people
- Mario Velarde, several people
- Mario Zanin, several people

== Surname ==
- E. A. Mario, Italian composer
- Lorenza Mario, Italian dancer

== Fictional characters ==
- Mario, a Nintendo video game character
- Mario Auditore, a Ubisoft video game character, see List of Assassin's Creed characters § Mario Auditore
- Mario Disel, the male protagonist of Code Geass
- Mario, the male pet of Brave Exkaiser, see List of Brave Exkaiser characters § Others

== See also ==
- Maro (name), Various
- Marino (name), Various
- Marioara, Various
- Marion (given name), Various
- Mariot, Various
- Mareo (given name), Japanese
- Mariko (given name), Japanese
- Marijo, Croatian
- Mariusz, Polish
- Marios, Greek (Μάριος)
