= Mario Rivas =

Mario Rivas may refer to:

- Mario Rivas (footballer, born 2000), Spanish football forward for Real Ávila
- Mario Rivas (footballer, born 2007), Spanish football centre-back for Real Madrid B

== See also ==
- María Rivas (disambiguation)
- Mario Riva (1913-1960), Italian television presenter and actor
