= Mario Bossi =

Mario Bossi may refer to:

- Mario Bossi (footballer, born 1909) (1909–2003), Italian footballer who played for Roma and Sampiedarenese in the Serie A
- A character from the Japanese manga and anime Gunslinger Girl
