= Mareo (given name) =

- Gender: Male

Origin
- Origin: Japanese
- Meaning: Different meanings depending on the kanji used

Mareo (written: 希生 or 真礼生) is a masculine Japanese given name. Notable people with the name include:

- Mareo Ishiketa (石桁 真礼生; 1916–1996), Japanese composer

== See also ==
- Mario (given name)
