= Mario Chicot =

Mario Chicot, also simply Mario, is a popular zouk singer from Guadeloupe. He became known with the hit Petite fille in 1988, and then had a string of hits in the boom for zouk music in France during the 1990s. In 2011 he released a comeback album Besoin de toi.
