= Mario Solomons =

South African cricketer

Personal information
- Full name: Mario Theodore Solomons
- Born: 24 February 1971 (age 55); Kuils River, Cape Province, South Africa
- Batting: Right-handed
- Role: wicket-keeper

Domestic team information
- Years: Team
- 1995/96–1998/99: Western Province

Career statistics
Competition	FC	LA
Matches	16	2
Runs scored	408	7
Batting average	21.47	7.00
100s/50s	0/2	0/0
Top score	67	7
Catches/stumpings	43/7	4/0
- Source: Cricinfo, 12 February 2025

Mario Theodore Solomons (born 24 February 1971) is a former South African first-class cricketer.

== Career ==
He featured in the Western Province squad for their unofficial three-day first-class match against the touring Australian squad in February 1997, taking three catches and scoring 28 runs in the second innings.

In February 2025, he was named as the captain of the South Africa squad for the Over-50s Cricket World Cup in Sri Lanka.
