= Mario Valdez =

Mario Valdez may refer to:

- Mario Valdez (baseball) (born 1974), Mexican baseball player
- Mario López Valdez (born 1957), Mexican businessman and politician
