= Mario Soto =

Mario Soto may refer to:

- Mario Soto (footballer, born 1933), Chilean footballer
- Mario Soto (footballer, born 1950), Chilean footballer
- Mario Soto (baseball) (born 1956), Major League Baseball pitcher
