= Mario Vega =

Mario Vega may refer to:

- Mario Daniel Vega (born 1984), Argentine football goalkeeper
- Mario Vega (pastor) (born 1958), Christian Pentecostal pastor
