= Mário Delgado =

Mário Delgado or Mario Delgado may refer to:

- Mário Delgado (equestrian), Portuguese equestrian.
- Mario Delgado (politician), Mexican politician
- Mars (rapper) (Mario Delgado), American rapper and record producer
