= Mario Baltadjiev =

Bulgarian composer

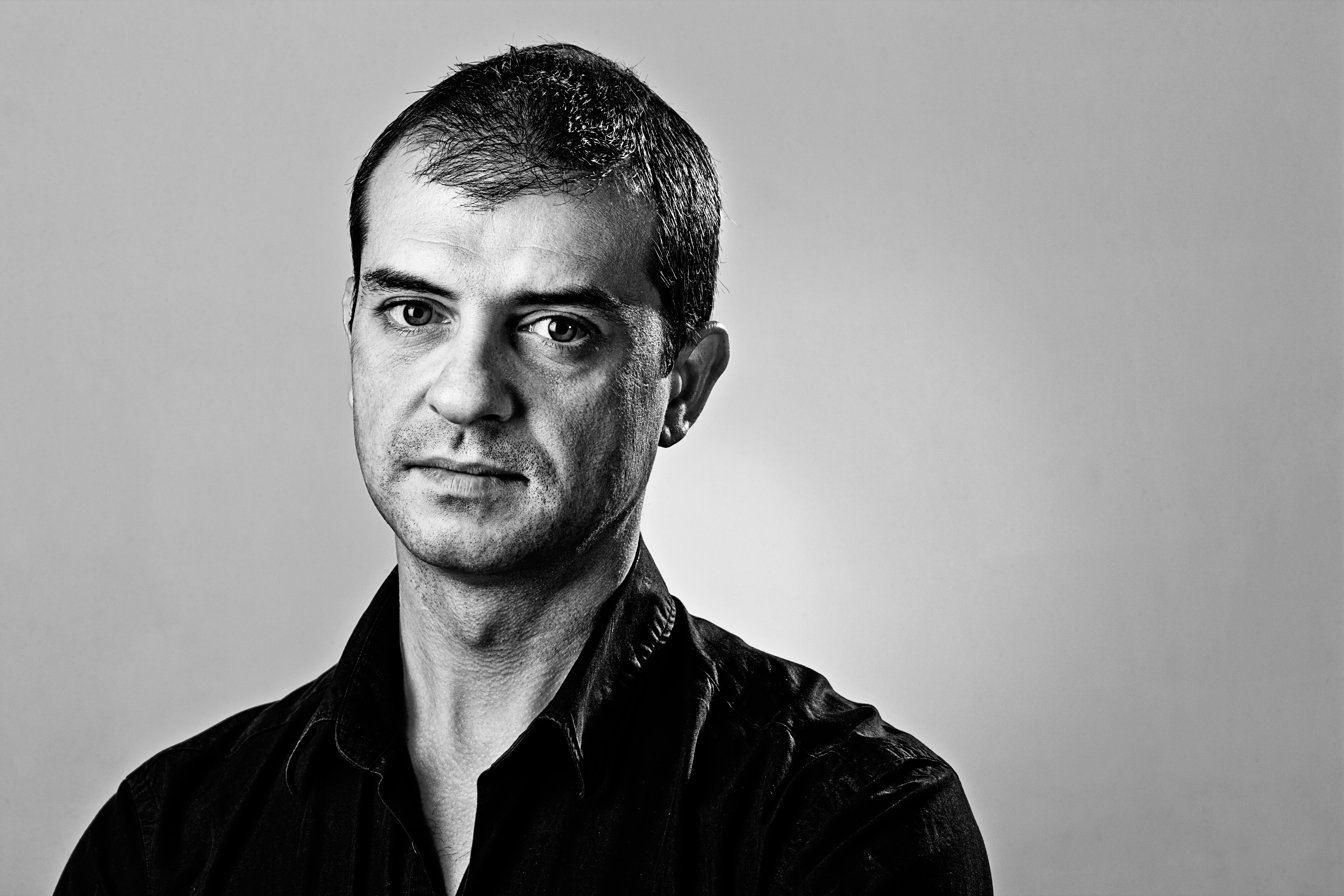
Mario Baltadjiev

Mario Baltajiev is a Bulgarian composer.

== Biography ==
He was born in 1971 in Yambol, Bulgaria in the family of opera singers. At the age of 6, he started playing the piano. He claims that he did not attend a music school, but rather likes to experiment. In the 1990s, he was a member of the group "Allegro", which performed mainly in clubs.

In 1998 started working as a sound engineer and producer at radio FM+ . Two years later, he received an invitation from Magardich Halvadzhiyan to work on the film " The Profit ", a BNT production .

After the film's success, he continued his work with Halvajian, composing music for Global Films' television shows.

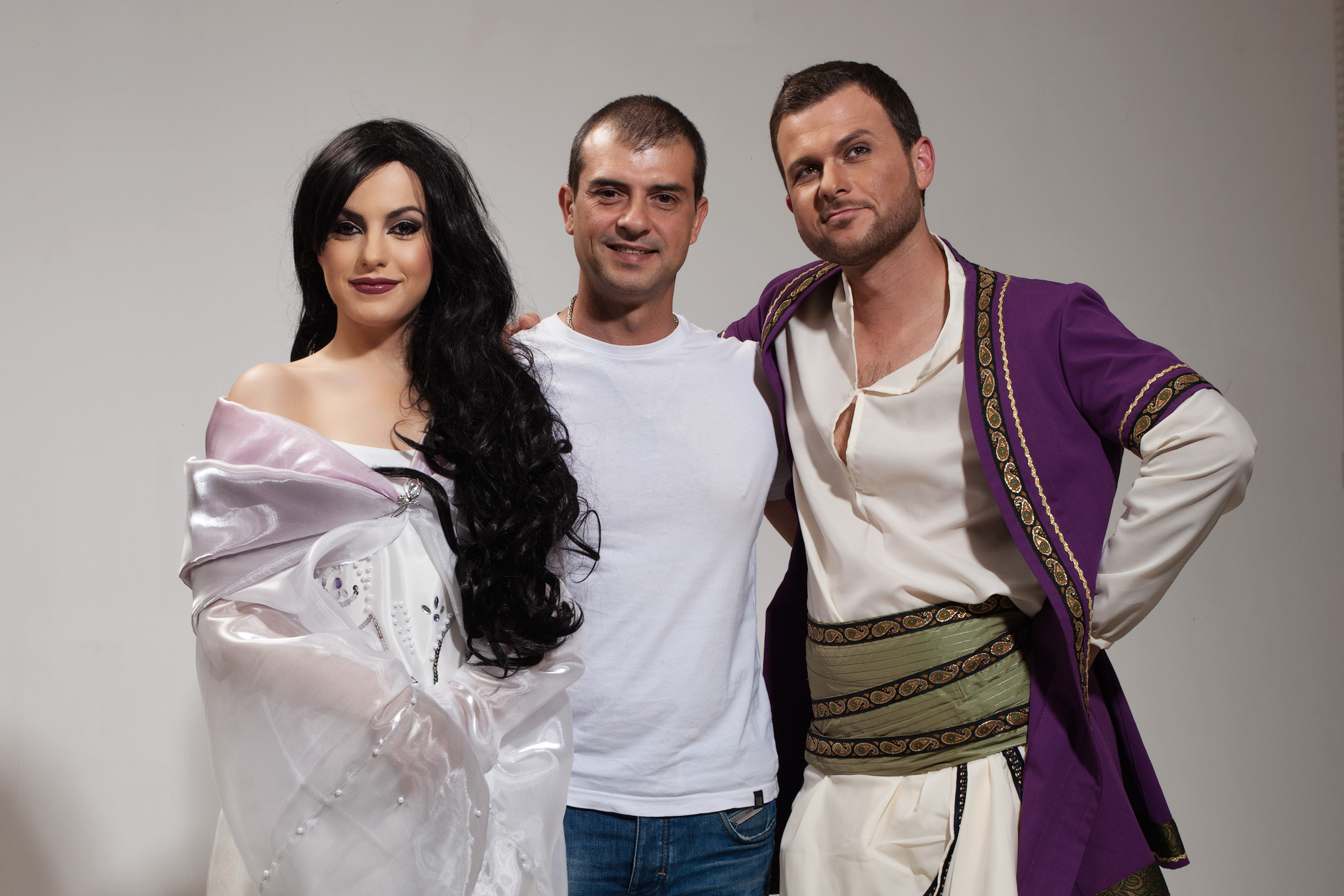
Mario Baltajiev, Poli Genova and Nencho Balabanov from the premiere of the musical Aladdin, 2012.

In 2012, having already gained a lot of experience in the field of advertising, ballet and cinema, he composed the music for "Aladdin", a musical created in tandem with the librettist Ivan Angelov, which was staged at the Musical Theater in Sofia.

In 2015 Baltajiev produced the musical "The Ugly Duckling", which was presented on the stage of the Modern Theater.

In 2019 Mario was invited by Krasimir Vankov to compose music for the All Inclusive series. After that, he was invited to work on the next Hidalgo Productions project - "Brothers".

In 2020, the director of "Radio Sofia" Iva Doichinova, invited the composer to create new signals for the radio's programs. After the successful launch of the new signals on the BNR airwaves, he was invited by the General Director of BNR, Andon Baltakov, to create a new signal for the Bulgarian National Radio in the spirit of modern trends, as well as new signals for the "Horizon" program. The new signal premiered in January 2021. For the first time in the history of BNR it was recorded by the symphony orchestra of the radio. The signal for the "Hristo Botev" program was also recorded by the symphony orchestra and launched in July of the same year.

In 2022 he was working on the fifth season of the hit series "Brothers".

== Projects ==
Radio
1998 – 2000	Radio FM+ - Melodies, Ads, Signals	sound director, producer
2000 – 2002	"The hour of ARA" - music radio show with host Toma Sprostranov	sound director, producer
2003	Radio FM+ - signals and melodies Euro Hot 30 – music ranking on radio FM+ with host Emil Kirilov	sound director, producer
2004 – 2005	"M-tel Box" - music radio show hosted by Marten and Tony Georgiev on radio FM+	sound director, producer
2007 and 2009	Radio "Sofia" - main package of signals	composer, performer, sound engineer
2018	"Hristo Botev" program -signals for the morning block	composer, performer, sound engineer
2020	Radio "Sofia" - main package of signals	composer, performer, sound engineer
2021	"Horizon" program - main signal, signals for news and specialized shows	composer, performer, sound director
2021	Hristo Botev program - main signal, signals for the morning block	composer, performer, sound director
2021	Radio "Bulgaria" - main signals	composer, performer, sound director
2022	Radio "Bulgaria" - program in Turkish, main signals	composer, performer, sound director
2023	Radio "Focus" - main signals	composer, performer, sound director

Shows
2002	"Sea of Love", BTV	composer, performer, sound engineer - background music
2003	"Russian Roulette", BNT	composer, performer, sound director
2003	"Masters of the Air", NOVA	composer, sound director
2004	"Zaloalozhi", BNT	composer, performer, sound director
2005	"You've Got Mail', NOVA	composer, performer, sound director
2008	"The Magnificent 6", BTV	composer
2008	"Clairists", BTV	composer, performer, sound director

Serials
2004	"Sea Salt", NOVA	composer, performer, sound director
2019	All Inclusive, NOVA	composer, performer, sound director
2020 – 2022	"Brothers", NOVA	composer, performer, sound director
2022	"Tales of the Hut", NOVA NEWS	composer, performer, sound director

TV Channels
2009	Ring TV – signal package	composer, performer, sound director
2013	Channel 3 – packet signals	composer, performer, sound director
2017	Max Sport – signal package	composer, performer, sound director

Theater
2012	Aladdin, the musical	composer, arranger, producer	National Music Theater - Sofia
2015	"The ugly Duckling"	composer, arranger, producer	Modern theater
2016	Samodivi, a fairy tale	composer, arrangement	DT Targovishte
