= Mario Radić =

Mario Radić may refer to:

- Mario Radić (tennis player) (born 1982), Croatian tennis player
- Mario Radić (politician) (born 1970), Croatian businessman and politician
