= Mário Évora =

Cape Verdean footballer

Personal information
- Full name: Mário Jorge Pasquinha Évora
- Date of birth: 28 January 1999 (age 27)
- Place of birth: São Vicente, Cape Verde
- Height: 1.84 m (6 ft 0 in)
- Position: Goalkeeper

Team information
- Current team: São João de Ver
- Number: 99

Youth career
- 2012–2018: Porto
- 2014–2015: →Padroense (loan)

Senior career*
| Years | Team | Apps | (Gls) |
| 2018–2020 | Águeda | 37 | (0) |
| 2020–2022 | Vitória B | 9 | (0) |
| 2022– | São João de Ver | 0 | (0) |

International career^{‡}
| 2020– | Cape Verde | 2 | (0) |
- * Club domestic league appearances and goals as of 06:56, 10 September 2022 (UTC) ‡ National team caps and goals as of 06:56, 10 September 2022 (UTC)

Mário Jorge Pasquinha Évora (born 28 January 1999) is a Cape Verdean professional footballer who plays as a goalkeeper for São João de Ver and the Cape Verde national team.

== Club career ==
Évora is a youth product of Porto, and began his senior career with Águeda in 2018 in the Campeonato de Portugal. He transferred to Vitória B on 2 August 2020. On 30 June 2022, his contract ended with Vitória B. Shortly after he transferred to São João de Ver for the 2022–23 season.

== International career ==
Évora was first called up to the Cape Verde national team in October 2017. He made his professional debut with Cape Verde in a friendly 2–1 loss to Guinea on 10 October 2020.
