= Mario Gentili =

Mario Gentili may refer to

- Mario Gentili (cyclist, born 1913) (1913–1999), Italian cyclist
- Mario Gentili (cyclist, born 1962) (born 1962), Italian cyclist
