= Mario Gutiérrez =

Mario Gutiérrez may refer to:

- Mario Gutiérrez (politician), former leader of the Bolivian Socialist Falange
- Mario Gutierrez (jockey), Mexican jockey
