= Mario Francisco Guillén Guillén =

Mexican politician

- Born: 4 October 1970 (age 55); Comitán, Chiapas, Mexico
- Occupation: Deputy
- Political party: PVEM

Mario Francisco Guillén Guillén (born 4 October 1970) is a Mexican politician affiliated with the PVEM. He currently serves, since 16 July 2013, as Deputy of the LXII Legislature of the Mexican Congress representing Chiapas.
