= Mario Frick =

Mario Frick may refer to:

- Mario Frick (politician) (born 1965), Prime Minister of Liechtenstein 1993–2001
- Mario Frick (footballer) (born 1974), footballer from Liechtenstein
