= Mario Velarde =

Mario Velarde may refer to:

- Mario Velarde (footballer, 1940–1997), Mexican football midfielder and football manager
- Mario Velarde (footballer, born 1990), Peruvian football winger
