= Mario Merola =

Mario Merola may refer to:

- Mario Merola (lawyer) (1922–1987), American lawyer and politician
- Mario Merola (singer) (1934–2006), Italian singer and actor
