= Mario Montoya =

Mario Montoya may refer to:

- Mario Montoya (swimmer) (born 1989), Olympic swimmer from Costa Rica
- Mario Montoya Uribe (born 1949), Colombian military general
- Mario Montoya (footballer), Salvadoran footballer
