= Mario Cecchini =

Mario Cecchini may refer to:

- Mario Cecchini (bishop) (1933–2021), Italian Catholic bishop
- Mario Cecchini (businessman), Canadian media and sports executive
