= Mario Peña =

Mario Peña may refer to:

- Mario Peña (basketball) (born 1940), Mexican basketball player
- Mario Fernando Peña Angulo (1952–2008), Peruvian politician
- Mario Alberto Peña (1980–2013), American-Mexican drug lord
