= Mario J. Valdés =

Literary scholar (b. 1934, d. 2020)

Mario J. Valdés (January 28, 1934 - April 26, 2020) was a literary scholar of Mexican descent who was an early faculty member of the Centre for Comparative Literature at the University of Toronto, established by Northrop Frye.

Valdés was born in Illinois and received his PhD at the University of Illinois, Chicago.

He also served as a president of the Modern Language Association.

He died in 2020.
