= Mario Flores =

Mario Flores can refer to:

- Mario Flores (Peruvian footballer) (born 1973), Peruvian footballer
- Mario Flores (Salvadoran footballer) (born 1943), Salvadoran footballer
