= Mario Salas =

Mario Salas may refer to:

- Mario Marcel Salas (b. 1949), American civil rights leader, author and politician
- Mario Salas (footballer) (b. 1967), Chilean football manager and former player
- Mario Salas (athlete), Cuban javelin thrower
