= Mario Chiesa =

Mario Chiesa can refer to:

- Mario Chiesa (cyclist) (born 1966), an Italian cyclist
- Mario Chiesa (politician) (born 1944), an Italian politician
