= Mario Corti =

Mario Corti may refer to:

- Mario Corti (violinist) (1882–1957), Italian violinist
- Mario Corti (skier), Italian Nordic combined skier
- Mario Corti (journalist) (born 1945), Italian journalist and writer
- Mario Corti (cyclist) (born 1946), Italian cyclist
- Mario Corti (manager) (born 1946), Swiss businessman
