= Mario Bianchelli =

Italian composer

Mario Bianchelli (1660 – 1730) was a composer from Rimini in the Papal States. He presented various oratorios and was known as a guitar virtuoso.

== Recordings ==
- Cantate & Arie ArsEnsemble, Tactus 2023
