= Mario Pezzi =

Mario Pezzi may refer to:

- Mario Pezzi (aviator) (1898 – 1968), Italian pilot
- Mario Pezzi (priest) (born 1941), leader in the Neocatechumenal Way.
