= Mario Losada =

Mario Losada may refer to:

- Mario Losada (politician) (1938–2015), Argentine politician
- Mario Losada (footballer) (born 1997), Spanish footballer
