= Mario Trejo =

Mario Trejo may refer to:

- Mario Trejo (writer), Argentine poet, playwright, screenwriter, and journalist
- Mario Trejo (footballer, born 1956), Mexican football manager and former defender
- Mario Trejo (footballer, born 1999), Mexican football defender
