= Mario Maisonnave =

Argentine-Costa Rican singer, songwriter and producer

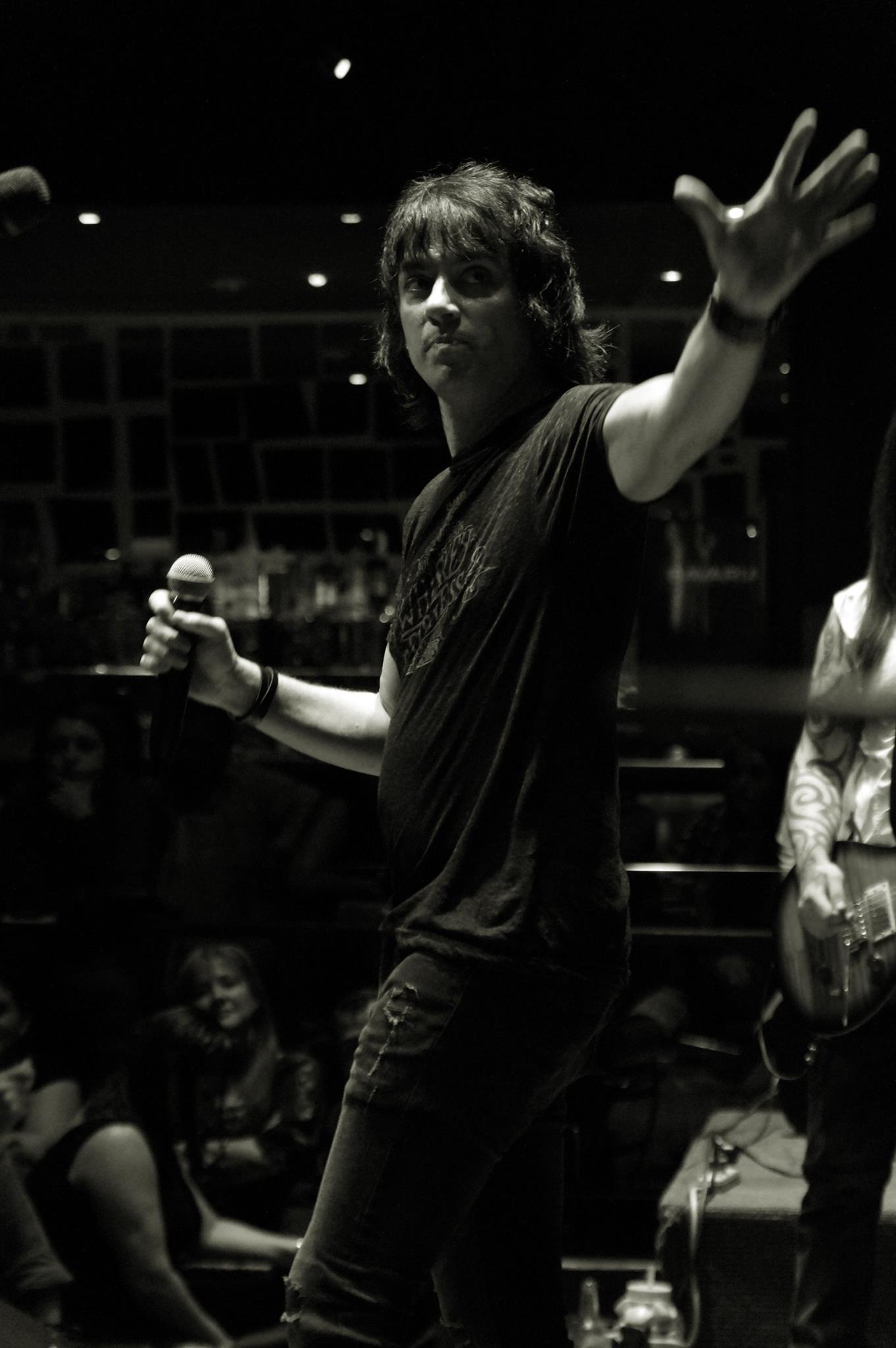
Mario Maisonnave performing at JazzCafe San Jose, 2019

Mario Maisonnave (born November 19, 1962, in Buenos Aires) is an Argentinian/Costa Rican singer / songwriter / producer. Maisonnave is best known as the founder and lead vocalist of rock en español band Modelo Para Armar- but he started out in Distorsion, the first rock act to be signed by Sony Music Central America. Over the course of his career Maisonnave topped the Central American charts six times. His first record Todo en su lugar (Sony 1985) with Distorsion broke sales records for rock en español in Central America. His album Mario Maisonnave / Modelo Para Armar (Sony 1989) stayed at number one for 4 weeks in Central America, achieving gold status. The album included the single Abrime tu corazon which put Mario as the first Central American pop artist to enter MTV Latin. Maisonnave currently lives in Southern California where he writes and produces for other artists as well as for his current project Bebeperro.
