= Mario Michela =

Italian painter

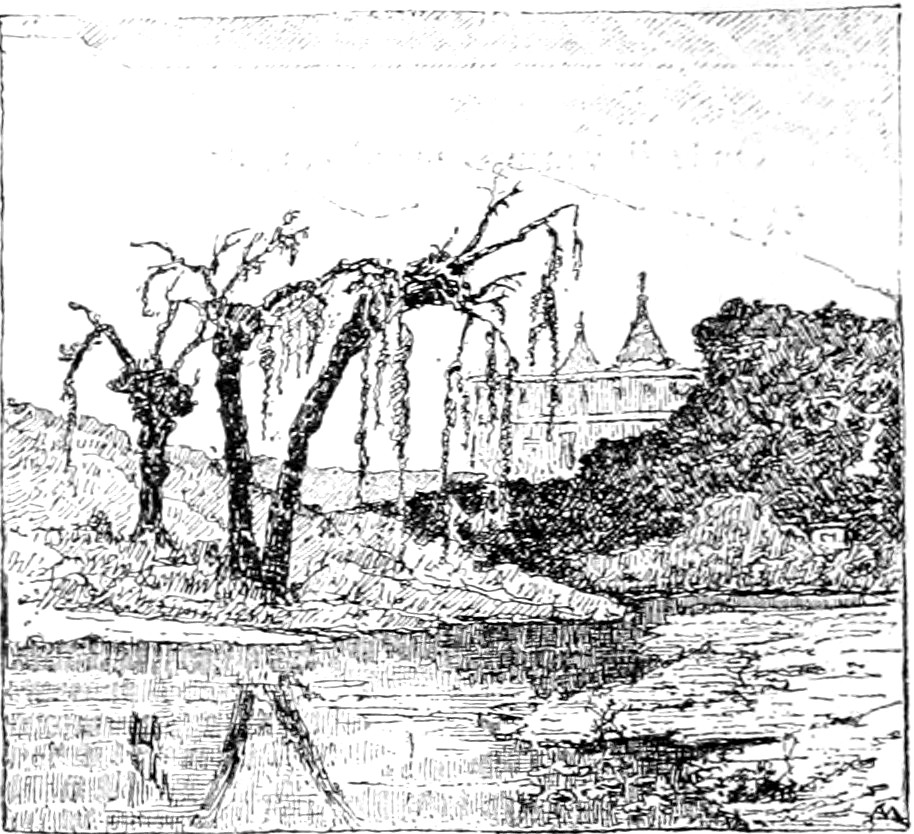

Mario Michela (1856, in Vigone – ?) was an Italian art critic and painter, mostly of landscapes in watercolours.

He also trained as a lawyer. In Turin, he was a pupil of Carlo Felice Biscarra and Lorenzo Delleani. He was a resident of Turin. He painted mainly alpine landscapes, among them those exhibited in 1884 at the Exhibition of Turin: Montagna, Colle Moncenisio; Colli e pianure; Tempo bizzarro; and Laguna grigia. Among other works are: Altura; Giornata triste; Sito alpestre; and Sulle Alpi. In 1881, he was noted to be travelling to India and Tibet with Doctor Mantegazza, and was to be a correspondent for Chronique de l'art.
