= Mario Salvini =

Italian sculptor

Mario Salvini (1863 in Reggio Emilia – 1940 in Florence) was an Italian ceramist and sculptor.

He was born in Reggio Emilia, but he had studied at the Florentine Accademia di Belle Arti, and in that city he had established the Salvini ceramic factory.

Among his works displayed at the 1885 Exposition della Società d'Incoraggiamento of Fine Arts in Florence was a stucco model depicting: Night of Gold. In the next year, at the same Exposition, he exhibited a stucco statue: Jugurtha in the Tullian Prison. At Venice, in 1887, Guida; Sciopero. At Bologna, in 1888, he exhibited a project of a bronze fountain, produced in the foundry of Giuseppe Pellas of Florence.

He also exhibited and travelled to the Chicago exposition, and was involved in the production of export ceramics. He exhibited his floral designs at the International Exposition of Turin in 1902. He gradually turned to teaching, and in 1919, he obtained a professorship at the Scuola d'Arte of Venice, then at the Florentine Istituto d'Arte, where he taught till 1934. His sons include Celso (Fiesole, 1889 - Florence 1947), a critic of dramatic theatre, and Guido (Florence 1893–1965), scenographer.
