= Mario Zanin =

Mario Zanin may refer to

- Mario Zanin (bishop) (1890–1958), Italian prelate and papal diplomat
- Mario Zanin (cyclist) (born 1940), Italian cyclist
