= Mario Escobar =

Mario Escobar may refer to:

- Mario Escobar (cyclist)
- Mario Escobar (referee)
- Mario Escobar Urbina (born 1952), Chilean politician
