= Mario E. Cosenza =

Italian educator

- Born: November 21, 1880; Naples, Italy
- Died: October 22, 1966 (aged 85); New York City, New York, US

Mario E. Cosenza was an educator and classical scholar of the Italian Humanists. He was the first principal of Townsend Harris Hall Prep School and Dean of Faculty at Brooklyn College in New York.

== Biography ==
Mario Emilio Benvenuto Angelo Cosenza was born in Naples, Italy on November 21, 1880, to Giuseppe Francesco Cosenza, a painter, and Emilia Cosenza, an opera singer. He and his three siblings emigrated to the United States in 1896, joining his parents, who had come to the United States four years earlier.

Cosenza studied at Columbia University, with a dissertation entitled "Official positions after the time of Constantine" published in 1905.

== Bibliography ==
- Ettore Pais, Ancient Legends of Roman History, tr. Mario Cosenza, 1905
- Mario Cosenza, Official Positions After the Time of Constantine, Doctoral Dissertation, Columbia University, 1905
- Mario Cosenza, Petrarch's Letters to Classical Authors, University of Chicago Press, 1910
- Mario Cosenza, Francesco Petrarca and the Revolution of Cola Di Rienzo, University of Chicago Press, 1913
- Mario Cosenza, The Study of Italian in the United States, Italy America society, 1924
- Mario Cosenza, The Establishment of the College of the City of New York as the Free Academy in 1847, Associate Alumni of the College of the City of New York, 1925
- Mario Cosenza, Biographical and Bibliographical Dictionary of the Italian Humanists and of the World of Classical Scholarship in Italy, 1300-1800, G.K.Hall & Co., 1964
- Mario Cosenza, Biographical and Bibliographical Dictionary of the Italian Printers and of Foreign Printers in Italy, G. K. Hall & Co., 1966
- Mario Cosenza, Checklist of Non-Italian Humanists, 1300 - 1800, G. K. Hall & Co., 1969
