= Mario Kovač =

Mario Kovač may refer to:

- Mario Kovač (artist) (born 1975), Croatian theatre and movie director
- Mario Kovač (scientist), Croatian computer engineering professor and inventor
- Mario Kovač (politician), Croatian politician, see Cabinet of Ivica Račan I
