= Mario Perrone =

Italian footballer (born 2003)

Personal information
- Date of birth: 6 February 2003 (age 23)
- Place of birth: Caserta, Italy
- Height: 1.86 m (6 ft 1 in)
- Position: Defender

Team information
- Current team: Isernia

Youth career
- Salernitana

Senior career*
Years	Team	Apps	(Gls)
2022–2023	Salernitana	1	(0)
2023	Avellino	0	(0)
2024–2025	Isernia	22	(0)
2025	Palmese	1	(0)
2025–	Isernia		
- * Club domestic league appearances and goals as of 16 November 2025

Mario Perrone (born 6 February 2003) is an Italian footballer who plays as a defender for Eccellenza club Isernia.

== Career ==
Perrone made his Serie A debut for Salernitana on 15 January 2022 in a game against Lazio.

On 31 January 2023, Perrone signed with Avellino in Serie C.
