= María Rivas =

María Rivas may refer to:

- María Rivas (singer) (born 1960), Venezuelan Latin jazz singer and composer
- María Rivas (actress) (1931–2013), Mexican actress
