= Mario Brell =

German tenor (1936–2021)

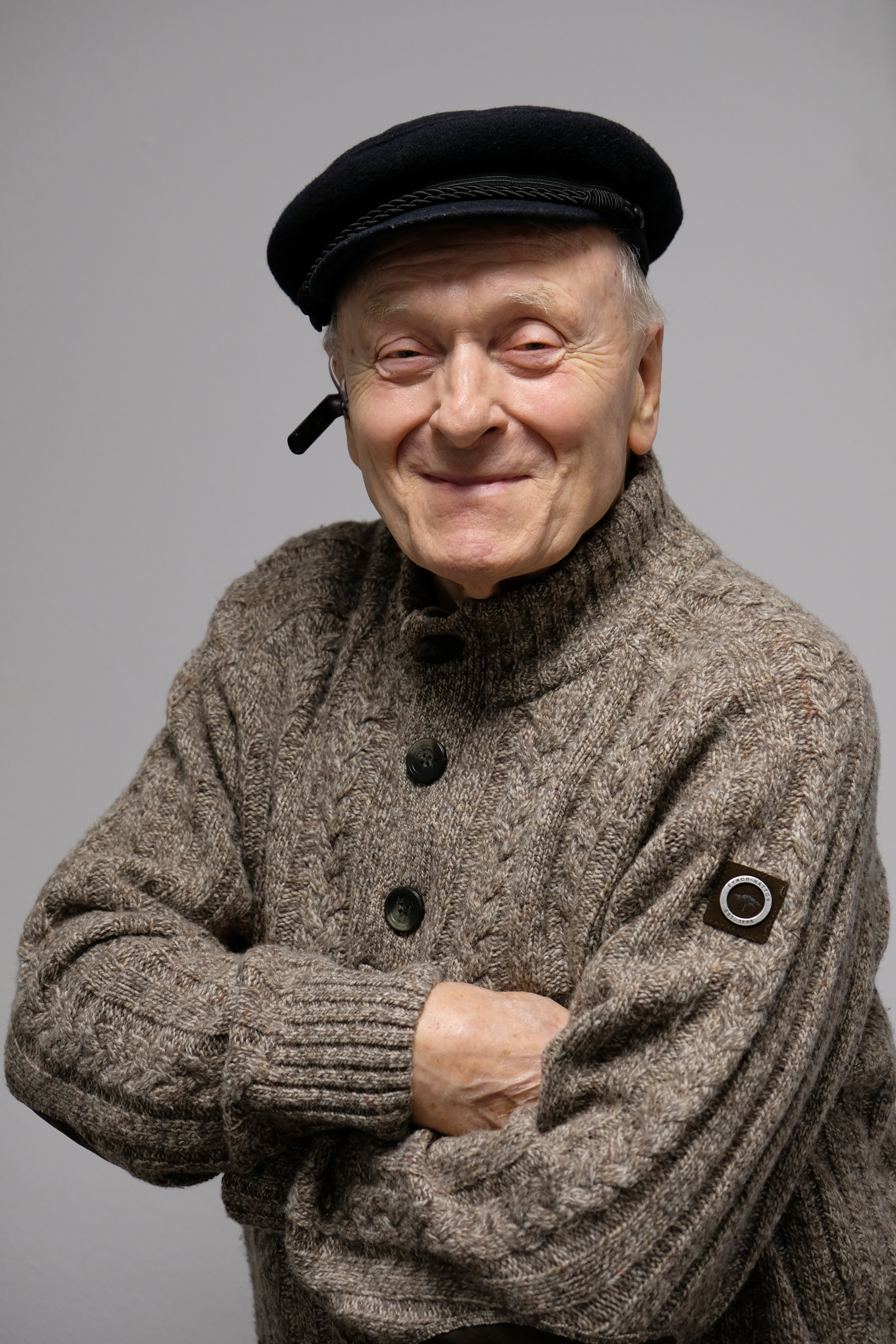
Portrait of Mario Brell (2019)

Mario Brell (17 October 1936 – 8 July 2021) was a German operatic tenor.

== Life and career ==
Brell was born in Hamburg on 17 October 1936, and grew up in the district of Barmbek. First, he started an apprenticeship as a painter and varnisher. With his brothers he joined a male choir, the "Mozart Quartet" in Hamburg-Wandsbek, which still exists today. There, he was discovered and promoted by the choirmaster Ernst Haddorp, who eventually introduced him to Carl Gotthard, with whom Brell began his vocal training.

In addition to his singing training, Brell took acting and dance lessons, at first continuing to work in his teaching profession in the construction industry.

After only two years of training, Brell was engaged at the Theater Hof. Another year later, he successfully passed his final examination as an opera singer at the Hamburgische Staatsoper.

Brell serves a highly extensive repertoire of over 30 operetta and over 80 opera roles and over the years has worked in all genres from operetta to Wagner, from lyrical tenor to heroic tenor.

After a serious heart operation in 1997, he had to leave the stage and could not sing for a long time. With the support of his family and his autobiography "Drum sei bedankbar", which he wrote during this time, he fought his way back into life - and onto the stages.

Brell died on 8 July 2021, at the age of 84.
