= Mário Campos =

Mário Campos may refer to:

- Mário Campos, Brazil, a Brazilian municipality located in the state of Minas Gerais
- Mário Campos (footballer) (born 1947), Portuguese former footballer

== See also ==
- Mario Campos López (born 1943), Mexican chess International Master
