= Mario Pini =

Uruguayan footballer (1938–2021)

Personal information
- Full name: Mario Rolando Pini Stagi
- Date of birth: 25 October 1938
- Place of birth: Fray Bentos, Uruguay
- Date of death: 17 April 2021 (aged 82)
- Height: 1.80 m (5 ft 11 in)
- Position: Defender

Senior career*
Years	Team	Apps	(Gls)
- Montevideo Wanderers
1962–1965	Real Valladolid	76	(2)
1965–1967	Mallorca	44	(0)
1967–1973	Sabadell	154	(1)
Total		275	(3)
- * Club domestic league appearances and goals

Mario Rolando Pini Stagi (15 October 1938 – 17 April 2021) was an Uruguayan professional footballer who played as a defender.

== Career ==
Born in Fray Bentos, Pini began his career with Montevideo Wanderers, and later played in Spain for Real Valladolid, Mallorca and Sabadell.
