= Mario Castro =

Mario Castro can refer to:

- Mario Castro (footballer) (1923–1983), Chilean footballer
- Mario Castro (gymnast) (born 1962), Cuban Olympic gymnast
- Mario Castro (rower) (born 1961), Chilan Olympic rower
