= Mario Nannini =

Italian painter

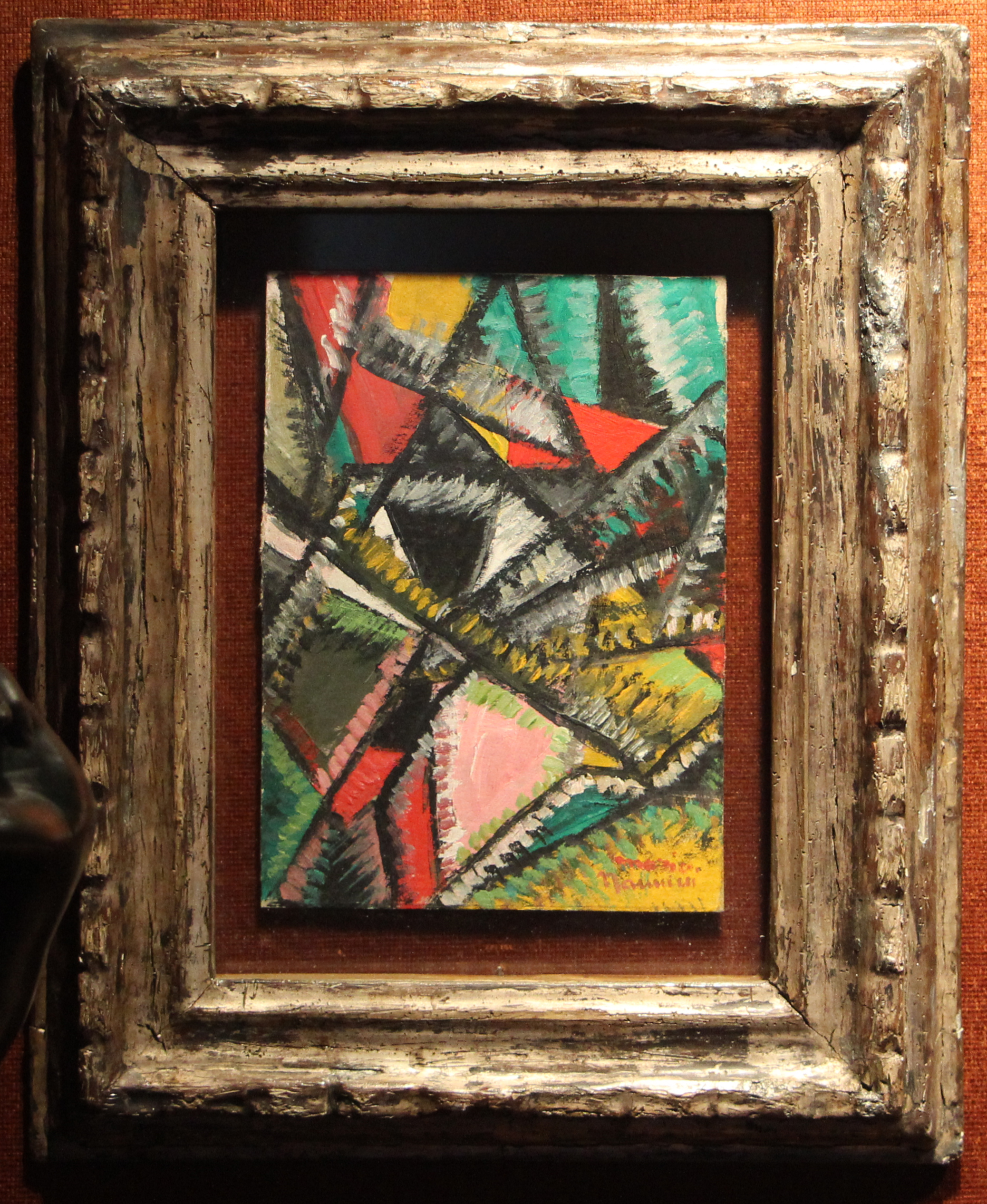
Composizione futurista, private collection

Mario Nannini (13 May 1895 – 24 October 1918) was an Italian painter, active in a Futurist style.

== Biography ==
He was born in the Buriano district of Quarrata, in the province of Pistoia. His father was an engineer, who died when Mario was but 10 years, and the family moved to Pistoia. Mario studied in the Scuole Techniche, and in 1912 attended the Regio Istituto Tecniche per la Tessitura e Tintoria ‘Tullio Buzzi’ of Prato. In Prato, he became a pupil of Emilio Notte, and in Pistoia, he met the painters Alberto Caligiani and Giulio Innocenti and the sculptor Andrea Lippi. While he was strongly influenced by the futurists, he was not included among the painters mentioned in a December 17 publication of the L’Italia futurista in 1917. He died unexpectedly from the Spanish flu. In 1960 a posthumous exhibition of two of his works was performed at XXX Biennale di Venezia as part of a Mostra Storica del Futurismo and in 1995 a retrospective was held in the Palazzo Comunale di Pistoia. A work of his is displayed in the collections of the Fondazione Cassa di Risparmio di Pistoia e Pescia.
