= Mario Spinetti =

Italian painter (1848–1925)

Mario Spinetti (1848–1925) was an Italian painter, whose works depict mythologic, Neo-Pompeian, and sacred subjects. He was born and resident in Rome. Among his works: a half-figure, Lidia, in 1881 in Milan. At the 1883 Exposition of Fine Arts in Rome, he exhibited a painting titled: Virginibus puerisque canto. In 1884 in Turin, he exhibited: Marriage in the 16th century. In 1887, in Venice, he exhibited: Una poetesa. In 1899, he painted frescoes of Sain Zaccaria, John the Baptist, and Elisabeth and Faith and Charity in the apse of the church of San Giovanni Battista dei Genovesi in Rome.
