= Mario Labacco =

Italian engraver

Mario Labacco (active 1551–1567) was an Italian engraver of the Renaissance period, active in Rome.

In 1559, he engraved some of the plates for a work on architecture by his father, Antonio Labacco, published at Rome. He also copied Martin Schongauer's print of the Temptation of St. Anthony and Beatrizet's print, after Giotto, of Peter walking on the Sea. No particulars of his life are recorded. Both this artist and his father are sometimes called Abacoo.
