= Mario Miltone =

Italian footballer

Personal information
- Date of birth: August 26, 1906
- Place of birth: Novara, Italy
- Position: Defender

Senior career*
Years	Team	Apps	(Gls)
1926–1927	Novara		
1927–1928	Borgosesia		
1928–1930	Lecce		
1930–1931	Ambrosiana-Inter	4	(0)
1931–1933	Messina	41	(2)
1933–1935	Catania		
1935–1936	Novara	6	(0)
1936–1937	Lecce		
1937–1938	Catanzaro		
1938–1939	Catania		
- * Club domestic league appearances and goals

Mario Miltone (born August 26, 1906) was an Italian professional football player.
