= Mario Schujovitzky =

Argentinian-Israeli footballer (1953–2021)

Mario Schujovitzky מריו זוכוביצקי
Personal information
- Full name: Mario Hector Schujovitzky
- Date of birth: 24 February 1953
- Place of birth: Santa Fe, Argentina
- Date of death: 16 March 2021 (aged 68)
- Place of death: Santa Fe, Argentina
- Position: Goalkeeper

Youth career
- Maccabi Santa Fe

Senior career*
Years	Team	Apps	(Gls)
1973–1975	Chacarita Juniors	23	(0)
- Hapoel Jerusalem
- Hapoel Be'er Sheva
- * Club domestic league appearances and goals as of 11:26, 3 June 2021 (UTC)

Mario Schujovitzky (Hebrew: מריו זוכוביצקי; born 24 February 1953) was an Argentine-Israeli footballer who played for Chacarita Juniors and Hapoel Be'er Sheva. He was known as one of the top goalkeepers in Israel at stopping penalty kicks.

== Club career ==
Schujovitzky made his professional debut with Chacarita Juniors and in 1977, at the age of 24, he arrived in Israel, where he developed the rest of his career until his retirement in 1987.

== Career statistics ==
=== Club ===
As of 22 June 2021

Club	Season	League			National Cup		League Cup		Other		Total	
Club	Season	Division	Apps	Goals	Apps	Goals	Apps	Goals	Apps	Goals	Apps	Goals
Chacarita Juniors	1973–74	Primera División	23	0	0	0	0	0	0	0	23	0
Career total			23	0	0	0	0	0	0	0	23	0
