= Mario Marín =

Mario Marín may refer to:

- Mario Marín (politician) (born 1954), Mexican politician
- Mario Marín (footballer) (born 1991), Spanish footballer
