= Mario Suárez =

Mario Suárez may refer to:

- Mario Suárez (writer) (1925–1998), Chicano writer
- Mario Suárez (singer) (1926–2018), Venezuelan folk singer
- Mario Suárez (footballer) (born 1987), Spanish footballer
