= Mario David =

Mario David may refer to:

- Mario David (footballer)
- Mario David (director)
- Mario David (actor)
