= Mario Bergara =

Mario Bergara may refer to:

- Mario Bergara (footballer) (1937–2001), Uruguayan footballer
- Mario Bergara (politician) (born 1965), Uruguayan politician and economist
