= Mario Almada =

Mario Almada may refer to:

- Mario Almada (actor) (1922–2016), Mexican actor
- Mario Almada (field hockey) (born 1975), Argentine hockey player
