= Mario Caccia =

Italian footballer (born 1920)

Personal information
- Date of birth: 22 June 1920
- Place of birth: Busto Arsizio, Kingdom of Italy
- Position: Striker

Senior career*
Years	Team	Apps	(Gls)
1939–1940	Pro Patria		
1940–1941	Pisa	3	(0)
1941–1942	Lecce	2	(0)
1942–1943	Sparta Novara		
1945–1946	Omegna		
1946–1947	Internazionale	5	(1)
1947–1950	Omegna		
1950–1953	Saronno		
- * Club domestic league appearances and goals

Mario Caccia (born 22 June 1920) was an Italian professional football player.
