= Mario Parodi =

Classical guitarist (1917–1970)

Mario Parodi (1917–1970) was a classical guitarist.

Mario Parodi was entirely self-taught, of Italian parents, born in Istanbul. Recorded are:

- Malaguena No. 3 From Suite Espana, Op. 165 (Isaac Albéniz)
- Vals No.7 (Frédéric Chopin)
- Suenio de amor (Franz Liszt)
- Canção de cuna (Johannes Brahms)
- Para Elise, Bagatelle in A minor (Ludwig van Beethoven)
- Cradle Song, Op. 49, No. 4 (Johannes Brahms)
- Waltz in A flat, Op. 69, No. 1 (Frédéric Chopin)
- Allegro comodo from Fantasia (3rd Movement) (Mario Parodi)
- Study In Blue and White (Cantabile) (Mario Parodi)
- The Prophet Bird from Woodland Scenes, Op. 82 (Robert Schumann)

== Music For Pleasure recordings ==
- Mario Parodi Plays the Classical Guitar (Music For Pleasure, MFP2094)
- Mario Parodi: Transcriptions for Classical Guitar (Music For Pleasure, MFP2140)
- Mario Parodi: Guitare Classique (Music For Pleasure, MFP6018)

== References or sources ==
- Chislett, W.A. (November 1970). "Nights At The Round Table: Transcriptions for classical guitar (Review)". Gramophone. Haymarket. p. 856. (Registration required)
