= Mario Rossi =

Mario Rossi may refer to:

- Mario Rossi (architect) (1897–1961), an Italian architect who designed Islamic buildings
- Mario Rossi (conductor) (1902–1992), an Italian conductor
- Mario Rossi (racing driver) (1932–?), an American NASCAR racer and team owner

== See also ==
- Mario Rossy (1962–), a jazz musician
