= Mario Macea =

Colombian footballer (born 1982)

Personal information
- Date of birth: January 27, 1982 (age 44)
- Place of birth: Montería, Colombia
- Position: Defender

Team information
- Current team: Atlético Junior
- Number: 17

Senior career*
Years	Team	Apps	(Gls)
1999–2005	Deportivo Pereira		
2006– Present	Atlético Junior		
- * Club domestic league appearances and goals

Mario Macea (born January 27, 1982) is a Colombian defender who plays for Atlético Junior in the Copa Mustang.
