= Mario Bossi (footballer, born 1909) =

Italian footballer (1909–2003)

Personal information
- Date of birth: 23 January 1909
- Place of birth: Rome, Kingdom of Italy
- Date of death: 14 January 2003 (aged 93)
- Place of death: Rome Italy
- Position: Midfielder

Senior career*
Years	Team	Apps	(Gls)
1929–1932	Roma	14	(0)
1932–1935	Sampierdarenese	73	(1)
1935–1936	Lecco	4	(0)
- * Club domestic league appearances and goals

Mario Bossi (23 January 1909 – 14 January 2003) was an Italian professional football player. He was born in Rome on 23 January 1909, and died there on 14 January 2003, at the age of 93.

Bossi played 4 seasons (22 games, no goals) in the Serie A for A.S. Roma and Sampierdarenese.
