= Marnie (given name) =

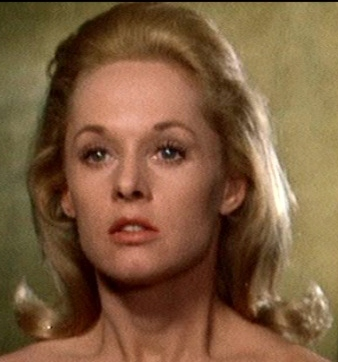
- Tippi Hedren played Margaret "Marnie" Edgar in the 1964 film Marnie.
- Gender: Feminine
- Language: English

Origin
- Meaning: Variant of Marina or a diminutive of names starting with Mar such as Margaret or Marion

Other names
- Related names: Maren, Margaret, Maria, Marian, Marina, Marion, Marius, Marjorie, Marn, Marna, Marni, Marnina, Martha, Mary

Marnie is a feminine given name sometimes said to be derived from the name Marina. Marna is a Swedish variant of Marina and also used as a Danish and Norwegian variant of Maren, which is derived from Maria or Marina. It has also been used as an English diminutive of names starting with Mar such as Margaret and Scottish variant Marjorie, and of Mary and its variants Marian and Marion. Marni can be either a spelling variant of Marnie or an independent name meaning rejoice in Hebrew. Marni is also in use as a Danish and Faroese unisex variant. Marnina is an extended version of the Hebrew name.

Awareness of the name in the Anglosphere increased due to the 1961 crime novel Marnie by Winston Graham and the 1964 psychological film thriller Marnie directed by Alfred Hitchcock.

== Women ==
- Marnie Andrews (born 1951), American actress
- Marnie Baizley (born 1975), Canadian professional squash player
- Marnie Barrell, New Zealand hymnwriter
- Flora Marjorie "Marnie" Bassett (1889–1980), Australian historian, biographer, and travel writer
- Marnie Blewitt, Australian academic
- Marnie Breckenridge, American singer
- Marnie Fogg, media consultant
- Marian "Marnie" Gillett (1953–2004), American gallerist and arts administrator
- Marnie Halpern (born 1956), Canadian academic
- Marnie Holborow, Irish academic
- Marnie Hudson (born 1988), Australian field hockey player
- Marnie Hughes-Warrington (born 1970), Australian academic
- Marnie Jaffe (née Greenholz), American singer and bassist
- Margaret "Marnie" Kennedy (1919–1985), Australian writer and domestic servant
- Marnie McBean (born 1968), Canadian rower
- Marnie McGuire (born 1969), New Zealand professional golfer
- Mary "Marnie" Harrison McKee (1858-1930), acting First Lady of the United States during the presidency of her father, Benjamin Harrison
- Marnie McPhail (born 1966), American-born Canadian actress and musician
- Marnie Mueller (born 1942), American novelist
- Marnie Oursler (born 1979), American home builder and television personality
- Marnie Ponton (born 1984), Australian long-distance runner
- Marnie Reece-Wilmore (born 1974), Australian actress
- Marnie Schulenburg (1984–2022), American actress
- Marnie Simpson (born 1992), English television personality
- Marnie Stern (born 1976), American musician, singer-songwriter, and guitarist
- Marnie Weber (born 1959), American artist
- Marnie Woodrow (born 1969), Canadian comedian and writer

== Variant spelling ==
- Margaret "Marni" Nixon (1930–2016), American soprano and ghost singer

== See also ==
- Marni
