= Marion (given name) =

- Gender: Unisex

Origin
- Origin: French, Latin
- Meaning: Diminutive French form of Marie or a form of Marius

Marion is a unisex given name.

As a feminine given name, it is a French diminutive of Marie that has been in use by English speakers since the Middle Ages. It was also occasionally considered a form of Margaret or Margery.

As a masculine given name, it derives from the Latin given name Marianus, a form of the name Marius.

It may refer to:

== Women ==
- Marion Adams-Acton (1846–1928), Scottish novelist
- Marion Adnams (1898–1995), English painter, printmaker, and draughtswoman
- Marion Aizpors (born 1961), German swimmer
- Marion Allemoz (born 1989), French ice hockey player
- Marion Angus (1865–1946), Scottish poet
- Marion Arnott, Scottish author
- Marion Aunor (born 1992), Filipino singer-songwriter
- Marion Aye (1903–1951), American actress
- Marion Bailey (born 1951), British actress
- Marion Barter (born 1945), Australian missing teacher who has not been seen since 1997
- Marion Bartoli (born 1984), French tennis player
- Marion Bauer (1882–1955), American composer, teacher, writer, and music critic
- Marion Babcock Baxter (1850–1910), American lecturer, author, financial agent
- Marion Hall Best (1905–1988), Australian interior designer
- Marion Zimmer Bradley (1930–1999), American author
- Marion Howard Brazier (1850–1935), American journalist, editor, lecturer, clubwoman
- Marion Bryce (1839–1920), Scottish-born Canadian educator and community leader
- Marion Corbett, pen name of the Misses Corbett
- Marion Cotillard (born 1975), French actress
- Marion Cunningham (author) (1922–2012), American cookbook author
- Marion Davies (1897–1961), American actress and mistress of William Randolph Hearst
- Marion Dickerman (1890–1983), American suffragist, educator, close friend of Eleanor Roosevelt
- Marion Dönhoff (1909–2002), German journalist and publisher
- Marion Donovan (1917–1998), American inventor and entrepreneur
- Marion Davison Duffie (1896–1965), American singer and voice teacher
- Marion Moncure Duncan (1913–1978), American businesswoman and 25th president general of the NSDAR
- Marion du Faouët (1717–1755), Breton bandit leader
- Marion Frater, New Zealand judge
- Marion Goldman (born 1945), American sociologist
- Marion Cameron Gray (1902–1979), Scottish mathematician
- Marion Hall (born 1972), Jamaican musician
- Marion Jones (born 1975), American sprinter
- Marion Jones Farquhar (1879–1965), née Jones, American tennis player
- Marion Kent (died 1500), English businessperson and property manager
- Marion Kracht (born 1962), German actress
- Marion Laboure, French economist, macro strategist and lecturer
- Marion Lüttge (born 1941), former East German javelin thrower
- Marion Mackenzie (born 1873) – British medical doctor and suffragette
- Marion Mann (singer) (1914–2004), American singer
- Marion Maréchal (born 1989), French politician
- Marion Marlowe (1929–2012), American singer and actress
- Marion Oberhofer (born 2000), Italian luger
- Marion Raven (born 1984), Norwegian singer and songwriter
- Marion Ross (born 1928), American actress
- Marion Ross (physicist) (1903–1994), Scottish physicist
- Marion Rothman (1928–2023), American film editor
- Marion Scott (1877–1953), English violinist, musicologist, writer, music critic, editor, composer and poet
- Marion Margery Scranton (1884–1960), American suffragist and Republican activist
- Marion Scrymgour (born 1960), Australian politician
- Marion Shilling (1910–2004), American actress
- Marion Shimmin (1879–1942), Manx politician
- Marion Short (c. 1880–?), American dramatist
- Marion Simmons (1949–2008), British judge
- Marion Simon Misch (1869–1941), American activist, teacher, writer and businesswoman
- Marion Stokes (1929–2012), American activist and archivist
- Marion Thees (born 1984), German retired skeleton racer
- Marion True (born 1948), American archeologist
- Marion Tuu'luq (1910–2002), Canadian Inuk artist
- Marion Tylee (1906–1969), New Zealand artist
- Marion Verbruggen (born 1950), Dutch recorder player and teacher
- Marion Wagner (born 1978), German retired sprinter
- Marion Walsmann (born 1963), German politician and Member of the European Parliament
- Marion Foster Washburne (1863-1944), American author, lecturer, educator
- Marion Ballantyne White (1871–1958), American mathematician and university professor
- Marion Wiesel (born Mary Renate Erster; 1931–2025), Austrian-American Holocaust survivor, humanitarian, and translator
- Marion Yorck von Wartenburg (1904–2007), German activist and judge

== Men ==
- Marion Barber Jr. (born 1959), American former National Football League player
- Marion Barber III (1983–2022), American former National Football League player, son of the above
- Marion Barry (1936–2014), former mayor of Washington, D.C.
- Marion M. Bradford (1946–2021), American scientist known for his protein quantification method
- Marion Broadstone (1906–1972), American National Football League player
- Marion Butts (born 1966), American National Football League player
- Marion Cox (1920–1996), NASCAR car owner
- Marion Knight Jr. (born 1965), birth name of Suge Knight, founder of Death Row Records
- Marion Mann (1920–2022), American physician and pathologist
- Marion Morrison (1907–1979), birth name of John Wayne, American film actor
- Marion Motley (1920–1999), American National Football League and All-America Football Conference player, member of the Pro Hall of Fame
- Marion Parsonnet (1905–1960), American screenwriter
- Marion Albert Pruett (1949–1999), American spree killer
- Marion Pugh (1919–1976), American National Football League player
- Marion Pat Robertson (1930–2023), American televangelist
- Marion Mike Rounds (born 1954), U.S. Senator from (and former Governor of) South Dakota
- Marion Silva Fernandes (born 1991), Brazilian footballer known simply as "Marion"
- Marion Spielmann (1858–1948), English journalist and art critic
- Marion Zioncheck (1900–1936), American politician

== Fictional characters ==
- Marion Chambers, a character in Halloween
- Marion Crane, the female lead in Psycho, played by Janet Leigh
- Marion Moseby, played by Phill Lewis in The Suite Life of Zack & Cody and its spin-off, The Suite Life on Deck
- Marion Ravenwood, in the Indiana Jones franchise
- Marion Tweedy, maiden name of Molly Bloom in James Joyce's Ulysses

== See also ==
- Marian (given name), another unisex given name
- Marnie (given name), occasionally used as a diminutive form of Marion
- Marot (name), used as a diminutive form of Marion in Adam de la Halle's pastorelle Jeu de Robin et Marion
