= Marian (given name) =

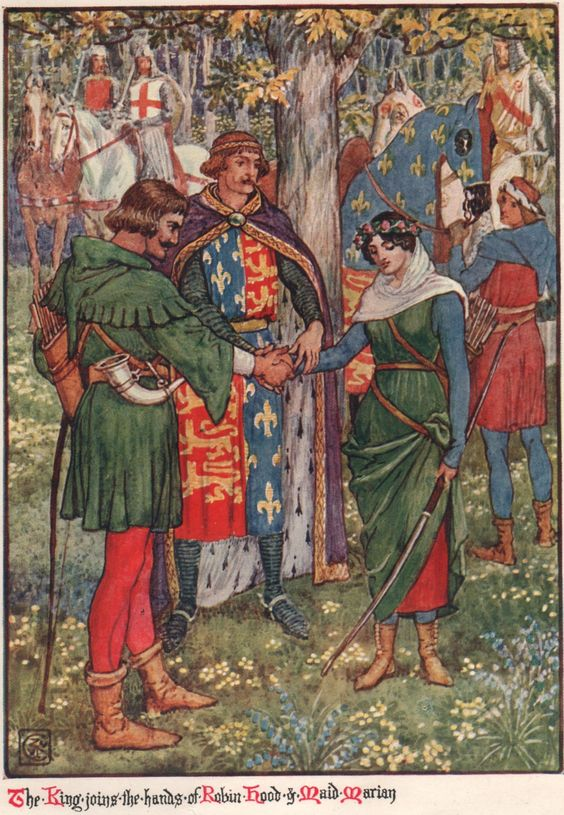
- The King joins the hands of Robin Hood and Maid Marian, an illustration by Walter Crane from the book Robin Hood and the Men of the Greenwood by Henry Gilbert.
- Gender: Unisex

Origin
- Origin: French, Latin

Marian is a unisex given name.

As a feminine given name, it is a variant spelling of Marion, a French diminutive form of Marie that has been used by English–speakers since the Middle Ages. It has also sometimes been considered a combination of the names Mary and Ann.

As a masculine given name, it is a form of Marius.

== Female ==
- Marian Anderson (1897–1993), African-American contralto opera singer
- Marian Bakermans-Kranenburg (born 1965), Dutch scientist
- Marian Beitialarrangoitia (born 1968), Basque politician
- Marian Bell (economist) (born 1957), British economist
- Marian Bell (field hockey) (born 1958), former Australian field hockey player
- Marian Binkley, Canadian anthropologist
- Marie Booth (1864–1937), third daughter of William and Catherine Booth, the founders of the Salvation Army
- Marian Collier (actress) (1931–2021), American film and television actress
- Marian Collier (painter) (1859–1887), British painter associated with the Pre-Raphaelite Brotherhood
- Marian Croak (born 1955), American scientist
- Marian Dawkins (born 1945), British biologist
- Marian Douglas (1842–1913), American poet and short story writer
- Marian Gleason (1916–2005), American politician
- Marian Goodman (1928–2026), American art dealer and gallery owner
- Marian Rivera Gràcia (born 1984), Spanish-born Filipino actress and model; better known simply as Marian Rivera
- Marian Hobson (born 1941), British scholar of French
- Marian Keyes (born 1963), Irish writer
- Marian Mahler (1908–1982), British designer, commercial artist, and book illustrator
- Marian Sutton Marshall (1846–1901), English typist and trade unionist
- Marian Nixon (1904–1983), American actress
- Marian Pour-El (1928–2009), American mathematician
- Marian Pritchard (1869–1945), British fashion writer and journalist
- Marian Pritzker (1923–2025), American philanthropist
- Marian Roberts (died 1980), American politician
- Marian Shields Robinson (1937–2024), mother of First Lady of the United States Michelle Obama
- Marian Scott (statistician) (born 1956), Scottish statistician and academic
- Marian Seldes (1928–2014), American actress
- Marian Estelle Melson Strack (1898–1974), American socialite and anti-semite
- Marian Trimiar (born 1953), American pioneering women's boxer

== Male ==
- Marian Bublewicz (1950–1993), Polish rally driver, 20x Polish Rally Championship winner
- Marián Čalfa (born 1946), ethnic Slovak former Prime Minister of Czechoslovakia
- Marián Chovanec (born 1957), Slovak Roman Catholic bishop
- Marian Cozma (1982–2009), Romanian handball player
- Marian Dora (born 1970), German underground filmmaker
- Marian Foik (1933–2005), Polish sprinter
- Marián Gáborík (born 1982), Slovak professional ice hockey player
- Marian Gold (born 1954), German singer from the synth pop band Alphaville
- Marián Hossa (born 1979), Slovak professional ice hockey player
- Marian Hristov (born 1973), Bulgarian footballer
- Marian Jaworski (1926–2020), Catholic archbishop
- Marian Kasprzyk (1939–2026), Polish boxer
- Marián Kočner (born 1963), Slovak entrepreneur
- Marián Labuda (1944–2018), Slovak actor
- Marian Moszoro (born 1974), Polish economist
- Marian Oprea (born 1982), Romanian triple jumper
- Marian Orzechowski (1931–2020), Polish economist and politician
- Marian Panchyshyn (1882–1943), Ukrainian medical doctor and public figure
- Marian Rejewski (1905–1980), Polish mathematician and cryptologist who solved the Nazi Enigma machine
- Marian Sârbu (born 1958), Romanian trade unionist and politician
- Marian Smoluchowski (1872–1917), Polish physicist
- Marian Spychalski (1906–1980), Polish military leader and politician
- Marián Studenič (born 1998), Slovak ice hockey player
- Marian Tumler (1887–1987), Austrian theologian and Grand Master of the Teutonic Order
- Marian Turski (1926–2025), Polish historian
- Marian Vanghelie (born 1968), Romanian politician
- Marián Varga (1947–2017), Slovak musician
- Marian Więckowski (1933–2020), Polish cyclist

== See also ==
- Marian (disambiguation)
- Marian (surname)
- Marianne (given name)
- Marion (given name), another unisex given name
- Marnie (given name), occasionally used as a diminutive of Marian
