= Oursler =

Oursler is a surname. Notable people with the surname include:

- Fulton Oursler (1893–1952), American journalist, playwright, editor, and writer
- Marnie Oursler (born 1979), American home builder and television personality
- Stephanie Oursler (born 1938), American visual artist and political activist
- Tony Oursler (born 1957), American artist (grandson of Fulton)
- Will Oursler (1913–1985), American writer (son of Fulton)

== See also ==
- Oursler, Kansas, ghost town, named after W.E.M. Oursler
