= De Marney =

De Marney is the surname of two brothers:

- Derrick De Marney (1906–1978), English actor and producer
- Terence De Marney (1908–1971), British actor, theatre director and writer

== See also ==
- Marney, a surname
- Marnay (disambiguation), including people with the surname
