= Line of Fire: The Morris Dees Story =

- Written by: James G. Hirsch; Charles Rosin
- Directed by: John Korty
- Starring: Corbin Bernsen; Jenny Lewis; Sandy Bull; John M. Jackson; Angela Bassett; James Staley
- Composers: Arthur B. Rubinstein; Billy Goldenberg (uncredited)
- Country of origin: United States
- Original language: English

Production
- Producers: Michael Joel Shapiro; Ellen Sklarz
- Cinematography: Richard J. Edesa
- Editor: Jim Oliver
- Running time: 95 minutes
- Production companies: BioJames Entertainment; Papazian-Hirsch Entertainment International

Original release
- Network: NBC
- Release: January 21, 1991

Line of Fire: The Morris Dees Story is a 1991 American drama film directed by John Korty and written by James G. Hirsch and Charles Rosin. The film stars Corbin Bernsen, Jenny Lewis, Sandy Bull, John M. Jackson, Angela Bassett and James Staley. The film premiered on NBC on January 21, 1991.

== Plot ==
Based on the true story of Morris Dees, a civil rights lawyer from Alabama, whose Southern Poverty Law Center battles neo-Nazis and the Ku Klux Klan.

== Cast ==
- Corbin Bernsen as Morris Dees
- Jenny Lewis as Ellie
- Sandy Bull as Stanton
- John M. Jackson as Curtis
- Angela Bassett as Pat
- James Staley as Welch
- Casey Biggs as Lee
- Harold Sylvester as Gilbert
- James Parks as Tiger Knowles
- Carl Anthony Payne II as Michael Donald
- Ann Weldon as Mrs. Donald
- Hal Havins as Teddy Kysar
- David Gale as Benny Hays
- Marnie Andrews as Maureen Dees
- Beau Billingslea as Hal
- Wayne Tippit as Tillman
- Shaun Duke as J. Richard Cohen
- Wiley M. Pickett as Henry Hays
- Le Tuan as Col. Min
- Roger Rook as David Andrews
- Roger Steffens as Reporter
- Conni Marie Brazelton as Reporter
- John Nesci as Alan Berg
