= Marnie =

Marnie may refer to:

== People ==
- Marni, a given name, including a list of people named Marni and Marnie
- Helen Marnie (born 1978), Scottish singer-songwriter known mononymously as Marnie

== Arts and entertainment ==
- Marnie (novel), a 1961 novel by Winston Graham
- Marnie (film), a 1964 adaptation of the novel directed by Alfred Hitchcock
- Marnie (opera), a 2017 opera by Nico Muhly
- The title character in When Marnie Was There, a Japanese anime film written and directed by Hiromasa Yonebayashi
- Marnie Marie Michaels, a character in the HBO series Girls
- Marnie Nightingale, a character in UK soap opera Hollyoaks
- Marnie Piper, the protagonist in the Halloweentown series, fantasy horror TV films that aired on Disney Channel
- Marnie, a character from Pokémon Sword and Shield

== Other uses ==
- Marnie, West Virginia, an unincorporated community
- Marnie (dog), an American dog made famous through social media

== See also ==
- Marney, a surname
