= Janet Coutts =

Last person to be executed for witchcraft in the Scottish Borders (d. 1650)

- Born: c. 1599 (estimated); Kirkurd, Peeblesshire.
- Died: Some time between 4 January 1650 and 18 April 1650; Venlaw Hill, Peebles
- Cause of death: Strangled at the stake and then burnt.
- Other name: Jonet Coutts
- Known for: The last accused witch in Peebles, Scottish Borders. She went on to name 88 others as witches after colluding with the witch pricker George Cathie.

Janet Coutts or Jonet Coutts (fl. 1640s) was the last to be executed for witchcraft in Peebles in the Scottish Borders and was at the centre of a major witch hunt that would implicate 88 others accused of witchcraft.

== Accusation ==
Coutts was accused in the parish of Kirkurd, Peeblesshire of causing the death of one man named John Symington and of causing another man to injure his leg. Symington had become gravely ill and died just a few days after he had been seen arguing with Coutts. Symington's mother was the one who accused Coutts of being a witch and of cursing her son. The accusations seem to be the result of grudges against Coutts.

When Coutts learned of the allegations being spread against her, she went to the Symington house on the day of his funeral and stood outside proclaiming

God be itt him never get rest in hallowed mulles till he mak me amends for his laying of his death upon me.

Kirkurd and Peebles (1741 map)

Witnesses claimed it was at that moment that Symington's corpse began to bleed and spill out of his coffin until Coutts left the funeral procession. She was then arrested and held at the Old Tolbooth in Peebles.

Initially, she refused to confess to the accusations against her so the Prtesbytery of Peebles took advice on the matter and sought to bring a witch pricker who had been working in the local area, George Cathie.

Following hours of interrogation and torture by the witch pricker's needle, she confessed to a pact with the devil and stated the devil had given her a kiss. The devil's mark was on her neck according to Cathie as this spot was the one insensible to his needle. She was made to confess that she had met the devil at her mother's house and that he had appeared as 'a male in green clothing. Her own confession (obtained under duress) on top of the claims from witnesses and the witch pricker's investigations into her would end up condemning her.

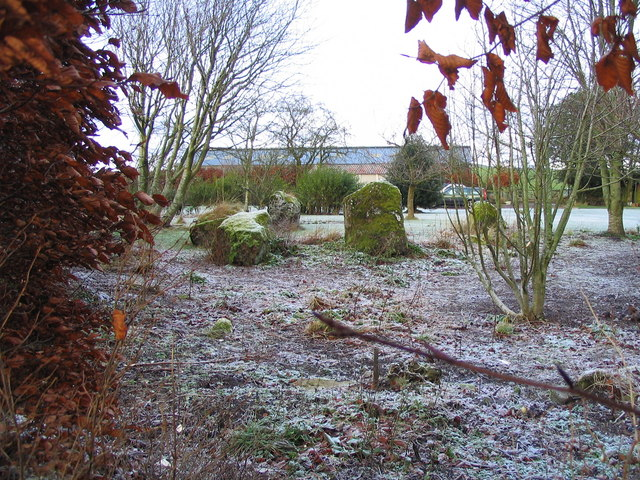
Stone circle at Kirkurd

A trial was set for 21 November 1649. Coutts faced 5 female accusers and 3 male accusers.

She was found guilty of witchcraft and ordered to be executed.

=== The witch pricker's financial gain ===
Professor Julian Goodare, Emeritus Professor of the University of Edinburgh, states that Coutts' case shows how witch prickers influenced prosecutions of witchcraft for financial gain.

In October 1649, the witch pricker George Cathie colluded with Coutts following her imprisonment in Peebles in order to make her his 'star witness'. Coutts would be kept alive long enough to be taken around the country to confront and identify other suspects and Cathie would then go on to investigate and prick their skin to determine their guilt or not. If he found a spot insensible to the pricking and which did not bleed then ergo that was where the devil had left his mark. In total, Coutts would go on to identify and condemn around 88 individuals drawn from Peebles, Biggar, Lanark and Jedburgh.

However, doubts emerged first in the presbytery of Peebles that her testimony appeared not to be 'trustworthy'.Then after she started contradicting herself the church elders in Biggar became even more suspicious of the inconsistencies in her testimony. The presbytery of Biggar noted her statements were increasingly contradictory and had a variety of names, dates, places, times. They determined the best next course of action would be to pray with her and read passages from the Bible with her.

On 10 January 1650, Coutts admitted in floods of tears that her accusations had been false and that Cathie had 'inticed' her for his own 'profite' with a bargain he had made in return for a final, desperate prolongation of her own life.

The Peebles Witch Hunts came to a swift end with 48 of those she has previously named as guilty then cleared.

== Death and legacy ==
Following her admission, Coutts was taken up Venlaw Hill in Peebles. There she was tied to the stake and executed by strangulation and burning. Coutts is recorded as being dead by 18 April 1650. Her age at the time is estimated to be 51 years old.

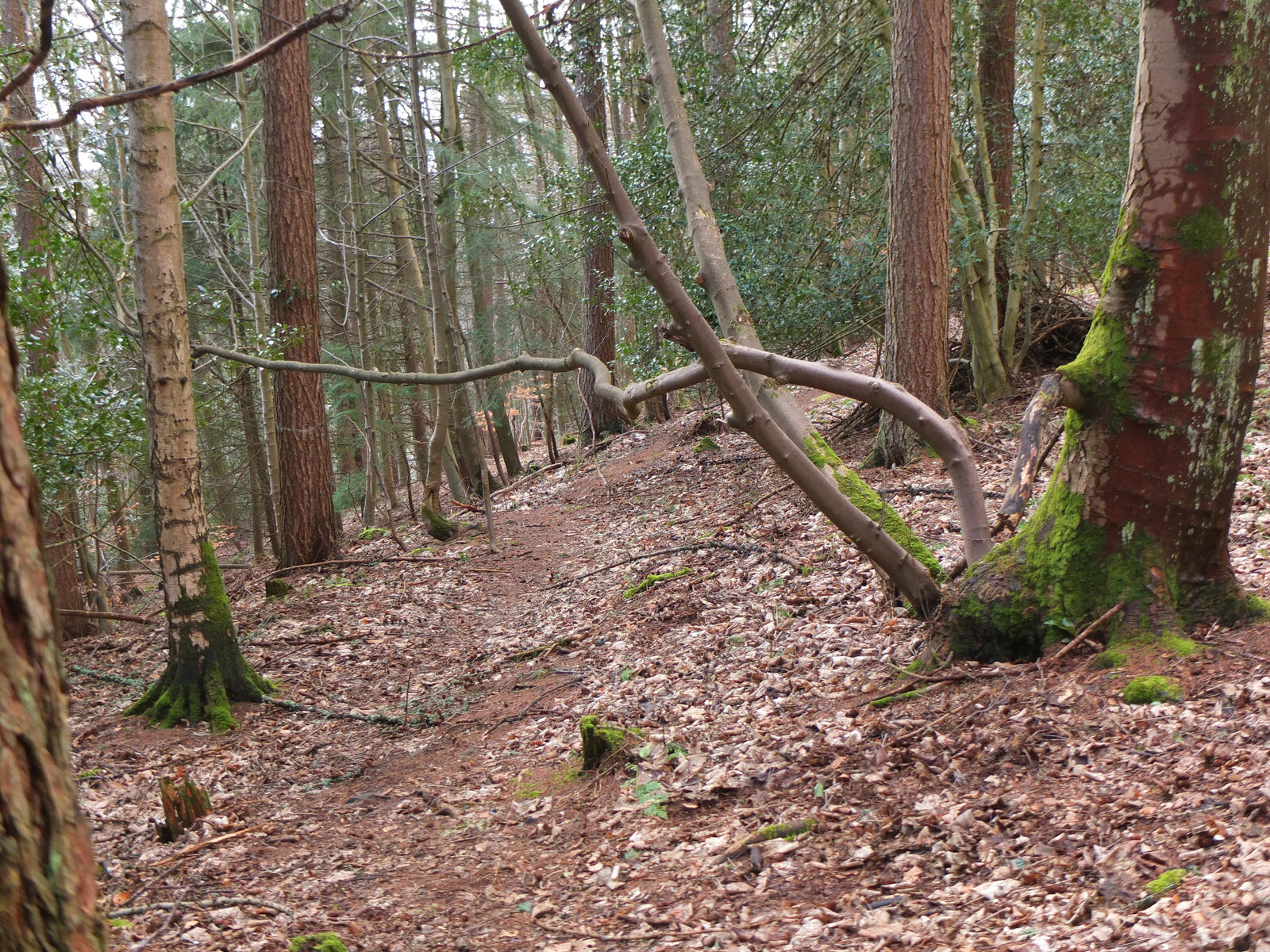
Path in Venlaw Woods, Peebles

Cathie is not heard from again and likely lost his livelihood following this disgrace.

A short film about Janet Coutts was made by Rosie Graham for BBC Scotland and broadcast on 26 March 2024.
