= Hélène Frankowska =

French mathematician

- Other name: Halina Frankowska
- Occupation: Mathematician
- Known for: Control theory, set-valued analysis
- Awards: SIAM Fellow

Academic background
- Education: University of Warsaw; International School for Advanced Studies; Paris Dauphine University
- Thesis: Nonsmooth Analysis and its Applications to Viability and Control (1984)
- Doctoral advisor: Czesław Olech; Jean-Pierre Aubin

Hélène Frankowska, or Halina Frankowska is a Polish and French mathematician known for her research in control theory and set-valued analysis. She is a director of research at the Centre national de la recherche scientifique, and works in the Institut de Mathématiques de Jussieu of Pierre and Marie Curie University.

== Education ==
Frankowska completed her undergraduate studies in 1979 at the University of Warsaw, in the Department of Mathematics, Informatics and Mechanics. After a year of studies at the International School for Advanced Studies in Trieste, Italy, she completed her doctorate of the third cycle in 1983 and her state doctorate in mathematics in 1984 at Paris Dauphine University. Her dissertation, jointly supervised by Czesław Olech and Jean-Pierre Aubin, was Nonsmooth Analysis and its Applications to Viability and Control.

== Contributions and recognition ==
With Aubin, Frankowska wrote Set-Valued Analysis (Birkhäuser, 1990, reprinted 2009).

She was an invited speaker at the 2010 International Congress of Mathematicians, in the section on control theory and optimization.

She is a SIAM Fellow, in the 2024 class of fellows, elected "for fundamental and pioneering contributions to optimal control theory and differential inclusions, both deterministic, stochastic, and in Wasserstein spaces".
