= Marney =

Marney is a surname. Notable people with the surname include:

- Dan Marney (born 1981), professional footballer
- Dean Marney (author) (born 1952), the author of several children's books
- Dean Marney (footballer) (born 1984), English footballer
- Harold Marney, a crew member of John F. Kennedy's PT-109 who was killed when the boat was struck by a Japanese destroyer
- Henry Marney, 1st Baron Marney (1447–1523), English Tudor politician
- Jo Marney, British model
- Laura Marney, Scottish novelist and short-story writer
- Paul Marney (born 1982), English footballer

== See also ==
- Layer Marney, a village in Essex, England
- Layer Marney Tower, a Tudor palace near Colchester, Essex, England
- Marni
- Marnie (disambiguation)
- Marnay (disambiguation), including a list of people with the surname
- De Marney, a surname
