= Peebles =

Town in Scottish Borders, Scotland

Coordinates: 55°39′07″N 03°11′20″W

- Town
- Peebles from the Tweed, showing the Old Parish Church

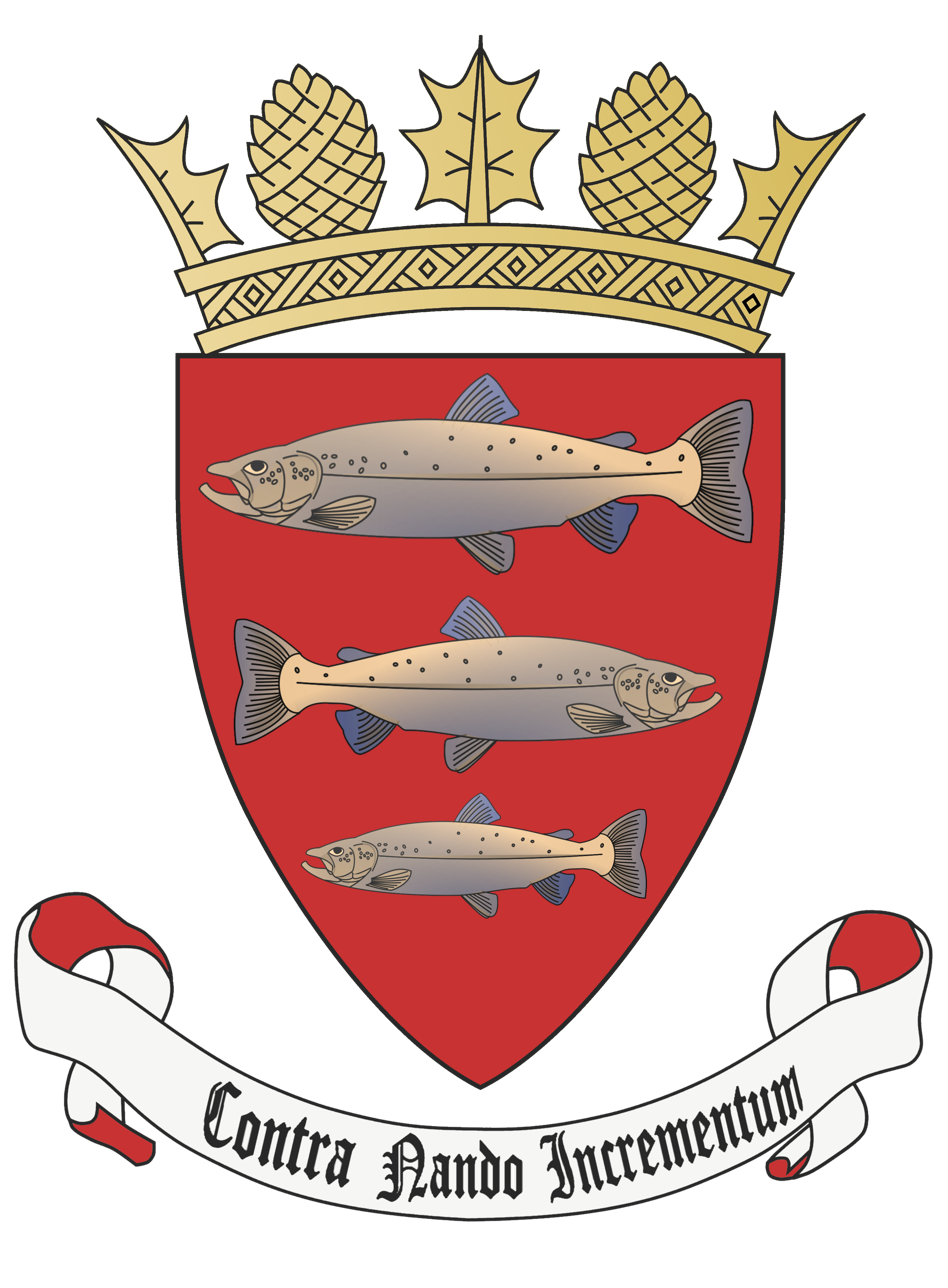
- Coat of Arms

- Location within the Scottish Borders
- Area: 3.85 km^{2} (1.49 sq mi)
- Population: 9,108 (2022)
  - Density: 2,366/km^{2} (6,130/sq mi)
- OS grid reference: NT2540
  - Edinburgh: 21 mi (34 km)
  - London: 313 mi (504 km)
- Council area: Scottish Borders
- Lieutenancy area: Tweeddale
- Country: Scotland
- Sovereign state: United Kingdom
- Post town: PEEBLES
- Postcode district: EH45
- Dialling code: 01721
- Police: Scotland
- Fire: Scottish
- Ambulance: Scottish
- UK Parliament: Dumfriesshire, Clydesdale and Tweeddale
- Scottish Parliament: Midlothian South, Tweeddale and Lauderdale

Peebles is a historic market town in the Scottish Borders, on the River Tweed. It was historically a royal burgh and the county town of Peeblesshire. The town's population in 2022 was 9,108.

== History ==
Initially a market town, Peebles played a role in the woollen industry of the Borders during the 19th and early 20th centuries. Most mills had closed by the 1960s, although the last one remained open until 2015. The character of Peebles has changed; the town serves as home to many people who commute to work in Edinburgh, as well as being a popular tourist destination, especially in the summer. In the mid-to-late 19th century health tourism flourished, centring on hydropathic establishments, which over time morphed into a hotel format, with Peebles Hydro Hotel being one of the few survivors of that era. Notable buildings in the town include the Old Parish Church of Peebles and Neidpath Castle. Other local attractions include a museum and the Kailzie Gardens. Peebles has won multiple awards for the range of shops on its High Street.

=== Historic features and traditions ===
The mercat cross of Peebles, decorated for the annual Beltane fair

The oldest building in Peebles is the tower of St Andrew's Church. The church was founded in 1195 by Jocelin of Glasgow. In 1543 it became a collegiate church. However, the church was largely destroyed (along with many other Borders abbeys and priories) by the soldiers of Henry VIII during the Rough Wooing in 1548. The stones of the ruins were pilfered for many other local buildings leaving only the tower standing amongst the gravestones of the churchyard. Another ancient church in the town is the Cross Kirk, founded in 1261. The ruins have been traditionally linked with relics of St Nicholas. Although now mainly ruins, the Cross Kirk plays a prominent part in the local festival.

There may have been a bridge over the River Tweed since the foundation of the town. The earliest records mention a stone bridge built by master mason John of Peebles between 1465 and 1470. In 1799 it was extended on the south side, with local mason John Hislop being killed by the collapse of an arch during construction. It was widened on both sides in 1834 by J & T Smith of Darnick. The current bridge was built between 1897 and 1900 by engineers McTaggart, Cowan and Barker, with the design incorporating street lighting.

The annual local festival in Peebles is called the Beltane, and involves (as with many Borders festivals) a Common Riding. The Beltane, proclaimed at the cross, culminates with the crowning of the Beltane Queen (a girl chosen from one of three local primary schools) along with her court, including the likes of the First and Second Courtiers, Sword Bearer and Standard Bearer; on the steps in front of the parish church. The adult principal of the festival is the Cornet, a local young man chosen by the organizing committee on a basis of being considered worthy of representing the town, who then carries the town standard for a year.

To the west of the town is Neidpath Castle, which can be reached on foot through Hay Lodge Park; the route has views of the castle. The castle is now closed to the public.

On the south side of the High Street are the old burgh offices. These incorporate the town's library, art gallery, and local museum. The building occupied by these is called the Chambers Institution, being deeded to the town by William Chambers, a member of the Chambers publishing family who originated in the town. Chambers' house can be found on the oldest street in Peebles – Biggiesknowe. Peebles tolbooth, the civic centre of the medieval burgh, is the only medieval tolbooth site in Scotland to have been excavated by archaeologists.

Peebles is no longer connected to the railway network. In years past, the Symington, Biggar and Broughton Railway had lines that connected Peebles to Edinburgh and Galashiels, with a goods station and Peebles and Peebles West stations. A connection to Edinburgh is maintained by Borders Buses service X62.

Historically Peebles and the Scottish borders have been the location of many textile businesses. Still today, March Street Mills is the location of Robert Noble along with its sister company Replin Fabrics.

=== Coat of arms ===
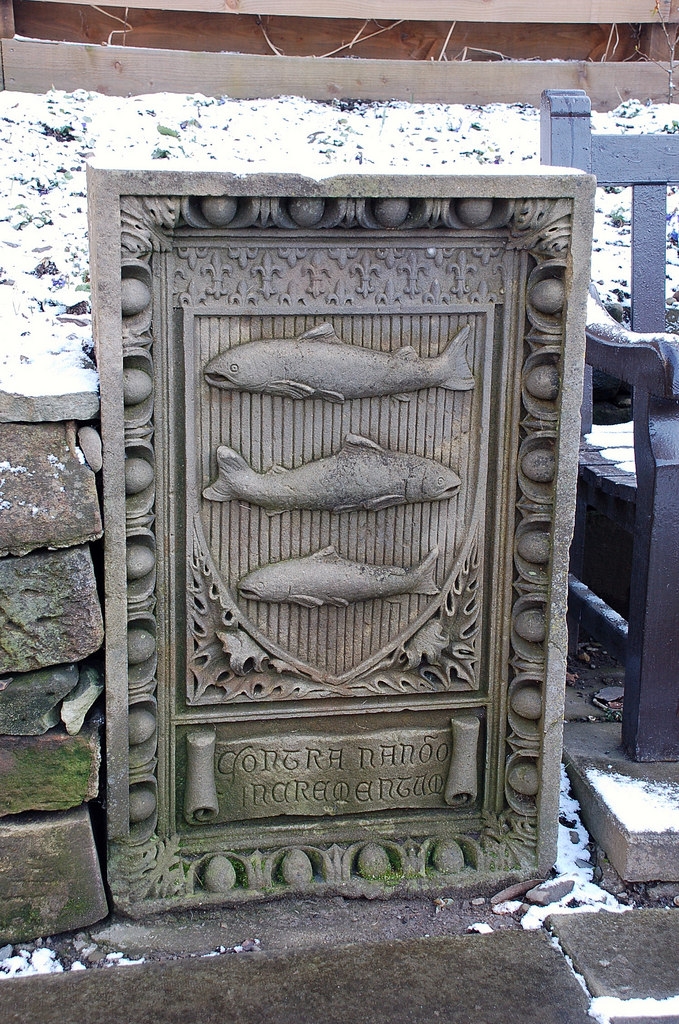
The coat of arms carved in stone at Northgate

The arms of the Royal Burgh of Peebles feature three salmon on a red field. The heraldic blazon is: Gules, three salmons counter-naiant in pale proper. The motto is Contra Nando Incrementum, Latin for "There is growth by swimming against the stream", referring to the annual migration of salmon up the River Tweed in order to breed. The one salmon facing forwards and two facing backwards represent the fact that for every salmon that goes up the river, two come back to the sea.

The arms are very old, first appearing on the town's mercat cross, which was built sometime before 1320. Originally the colours were not standardised, the background variously appearing as blue, green or red. The last seems to have been most common, and it was red that was chosen when the arms were formally granted by Lord Lyon in 1894, following a petition from the town clerk, William Buchan, who had previously received a letter from A. C. Fox-Davies questioning the burgh's right to use the arms.

After the abolition of the old Scottish burghs in 1975, the arms became redundant. In 1988 they were regranted to the Royal Burgh of Peebles and District Community Council, who continue to use the arms today, with the addition of a community council's coronet. The traditional province of Ångermanland in Sweden also has a very similar coat of arms, but with a blue background.

== Location ==
An aerial view of Peebles

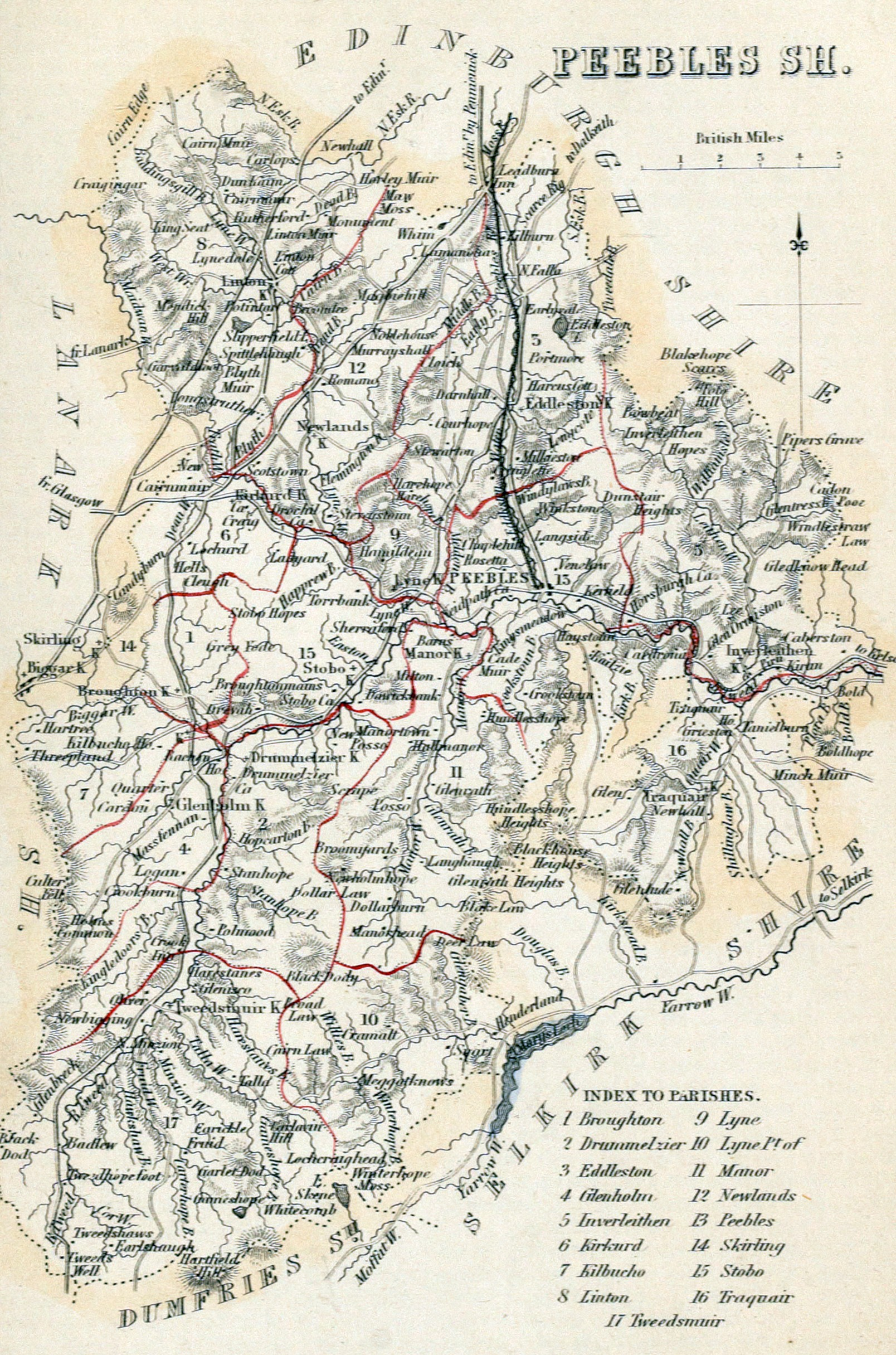
Map of Peeblesshire from the 19th-century Imperial Gazetteer of Scotland

Peebles lies at the confluence of the River Tweed and Eddleston Water (locally called "the Cuddy"). The Tweed flows west to east, and the Eddleston flows from the north, turning to flow southwest 300 yd (270 m) before the confluence. This south-westerly turn demarcates a raised triangular piece of land, open to the east but contained by the rivers to the south and north. The name is generally accepted to come from the Brythonic pebyll tents, signifying a temporary settlement.

From around 1570, the eastern side was defended by a town wall, which ran in an east-facing arc, through which the road to Glentress passed at the East Gate. The road passing through this gate, the Eastgate, is one of four gates in Peebles, the others being Northgate, Bridgegate (where the Eddleston Water was crossed to the north of town), and Ludgate (the western gate of the town), now called Young Street.

At the junction of Eastgate and Northgate roads, where the Eastgate becomes High Street, is an ancient market cross. The present-day market is held in a car park adjacent to the site of the former railway station, at the north and south ends of which are the remains of the town wall. Peebles High Street runs parallel with the Tweed along the spine of a ridge, at the west end of which is the parish church.

== Facilities ==
View of Peebles from the surrounding hills

In 2014 Creative Scotland named Peebles the most creative place of its size in Scotland, presenting the town with a Creative Place Award and £100,000 to enhance arts events, festivals, and arts commissions. Most arts performances take place in the Eastgate Theatre on the High Street which has a year-round programme of music, drama, dance, talks, and classes for children and adults. The town also has four major annual festivals – the Beltane Festival, Peebles Arts Festival, Tweedlove Bike Festival, and Imaginarium. The town has a concert band, a silver band and an orchestra.

Peebles is a popular centre for walkers, cyclists, and horse riders. It is the eastern terminus of the John Buchan Way, a 22-kilometre (14 mi) walking route which runs between Peebles and Broughton. The Cross Borders Drove Road, an 82-kilometre (51 mi) route between Hawick and Little Vantage, also passes through the town.

The town is home to two long-established Scottish senior sporting clubs. Peebles Rovers F.C. provides Peebles with a senior Football team in the East of Scotland Football League, meanwhile Peebles RFC currently represent the town in Scottish National League Division Two in the Scottish Rugby pyramid system.

Peebles has an 18-hole golf course located at the upper end of Kirkland Street. The golf club was formerly owned and run by the local council before being taken over and run by its own members.

Peebles has three primary schools: Kingsland (now relocated to Neidpath Road from its original position on Rosetta Road), Priorsford, and the Roman Catholic Halyrude Primary School (now relocated from Elcho Street to the former Kingsland primary school building on Rosetta road). Peebles also has the largest secondary school in the Borders, Peebles High School, which is attended by pupils from all over Tweeddale.

In 2005, a study by the New Economics Foundation ranked Peebles as the best town in Scotland (second best in the UK, after Hebden Bridge in Yorkshire) for a range of independent shops and 'home town identity'.

The local health facility is Hay Lodge Hospital in Neidpath Road.

== Notable people ==
- David Ballantyne (1914–1997), cricketer
- John Bathgate (1809–1886), New Zealand politician who grew up in Peebles
- Eric Bogle (b. 1944), Folk musician resident in Australia, born in Peebles
- Scott Brash (b. 1985), Olympic gold medallist
- John Buchan (1875–1940), author and politician with close family links to the town
- Robert Carter (1807-1889), book publisher, briefly taught in the town before emigrating to the United States
- Robert Chambers (1802–1871), publisher and author of Vestiges of the Natural History of Creation
- William Chambers (1800–1883), publisher, brother of Robert
- Finlay Christie, New Zealand rugby player born in Peebles
- Brian Cook (football administrator) (b. 1955), Australian football administrator, born in Peebles
- S. R. Crockett (1859-1914) prominent Scottish novelist. Based in Peebles from 1906.
- O. Douglas (Anna Masterton Buchan) (1877–1948), novelist; Priorsford, in her novels, is based on Peebles
- Bill Gilmour (b. 1939), Film and Television Producer/Director.
- James Grieve (1841–1924), horticulturist and namesake of the James Grieve apple, born in Peebles
- Sir Robert J. M. Inglis (1881–1962) railway engineer
- William Keddie (1809–1877) scientist and creator of the Scottish Sunday School system
- Charles Leedham-Green Mathematician at QMUL, famous for his work on computational group theory
- John Mathison (1901–1982), New Zealand MP born in Peebles
- Ernest Maylard (1855–1947) surgeon and mountaineer, retired to Peebles and is buried there
- B. N. H. Orphoot (1880–1964) architect
- Mungo Park (1771–1806), practised medicine, and his house on the north of the Cuddy bears a commemorative plaque
- Alexander William Stewart (1868–1933), a naval architect, engineer, and inventor
- Catherine Maxwell Stuart, 21st Lady of Traquair (born 1964), born in Peebles
- Kevin Thomson (b. 1984), footballer who grew up in Peebles
- Marioun Twedy (fl. 1649), accused of witchcraft in Peebles.
- Janet Coutts (d.1650), accused of witchcraft in Peebles and made to implicate 88 others.
- John Veitch (1829–1894), philosopher and poet, born in Peebles

== Twin town ==
Peebles is twinned with:

- Hendaye, Basque Country, Pyrénées-Atlantiques, France

== Gallery ==
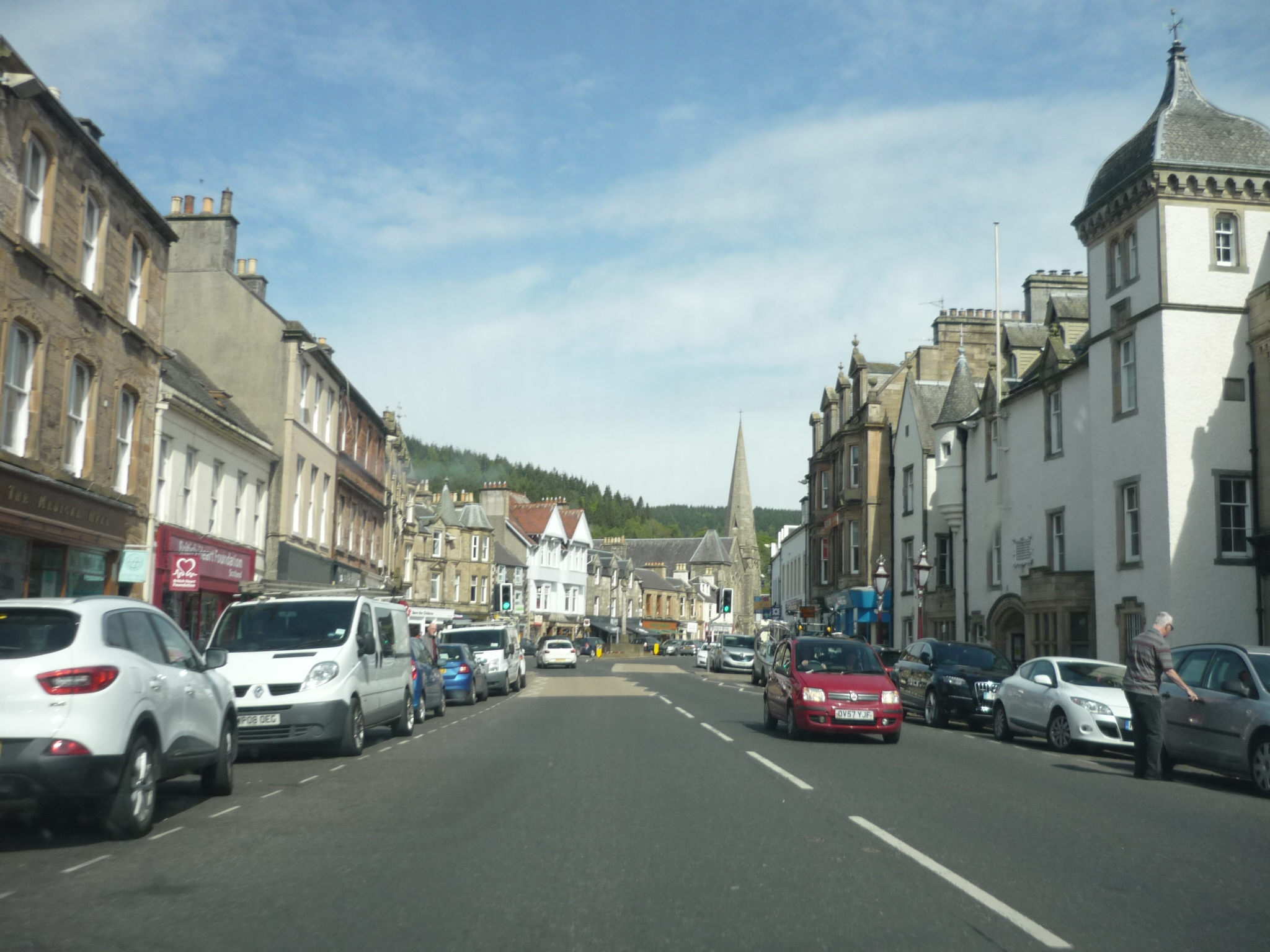
High Street looking towards Eastgate (2018)

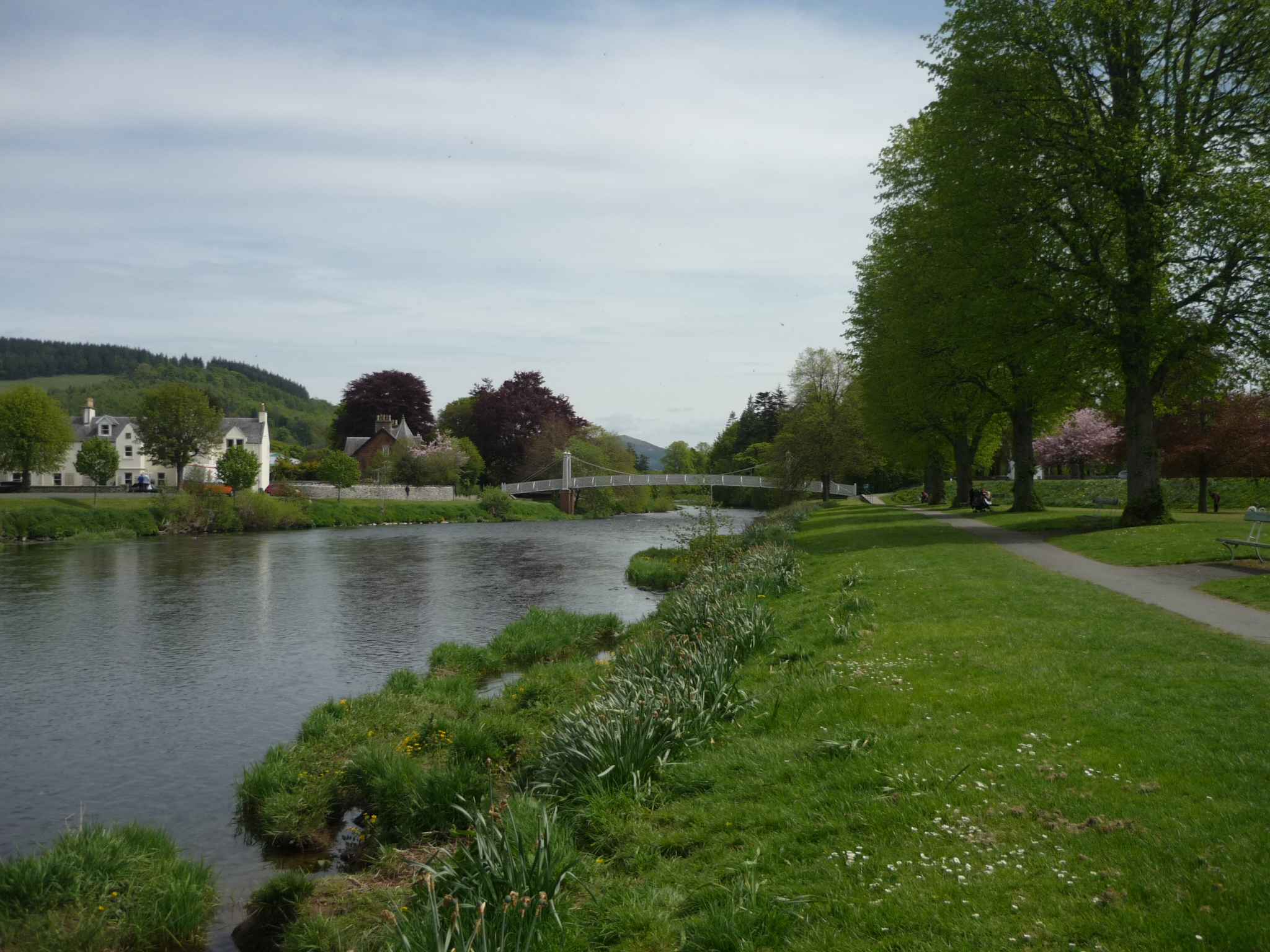
River Tweed looking downstream (2018)

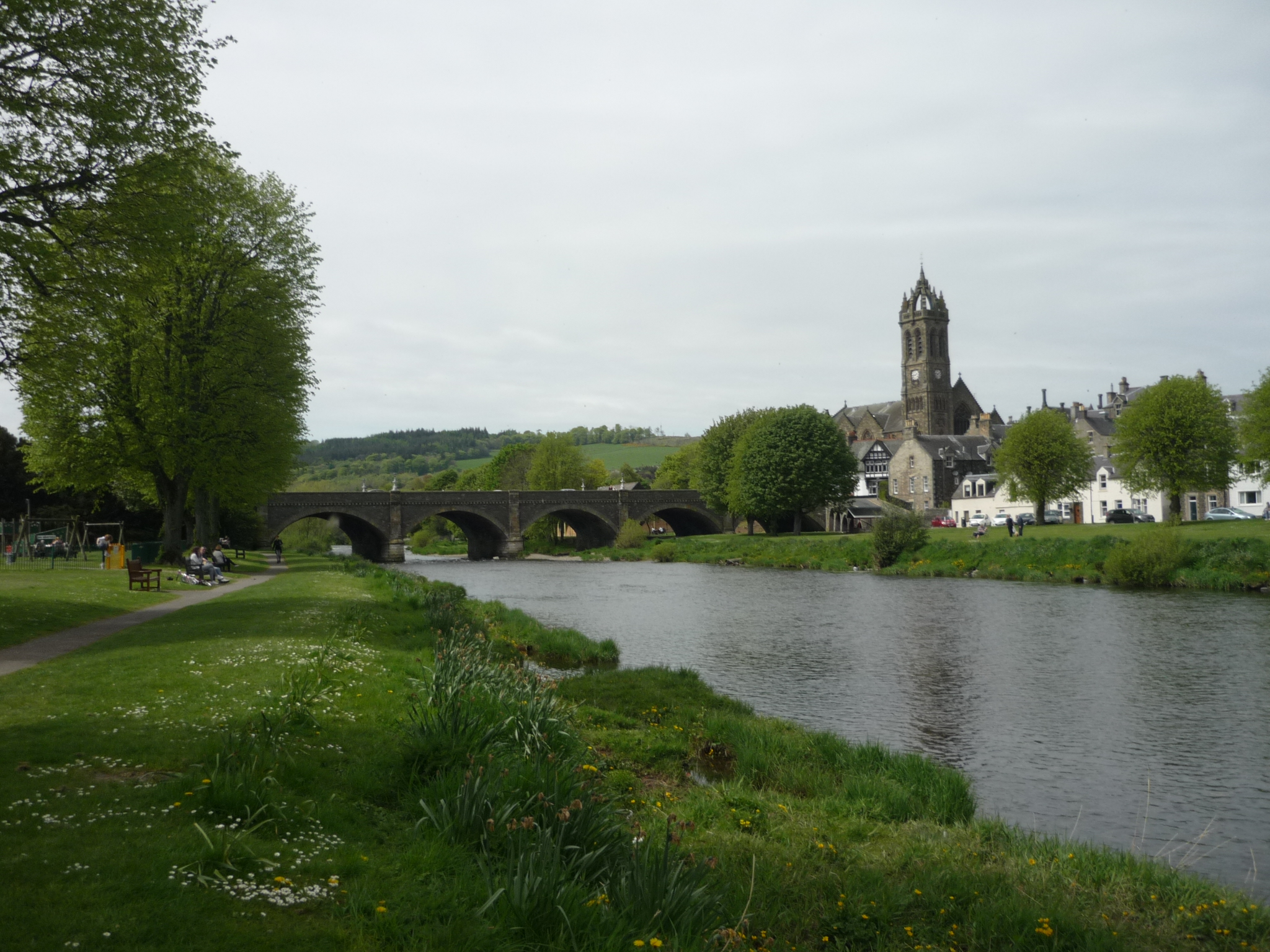
River Tweed looking upstream and towards the town (2018)

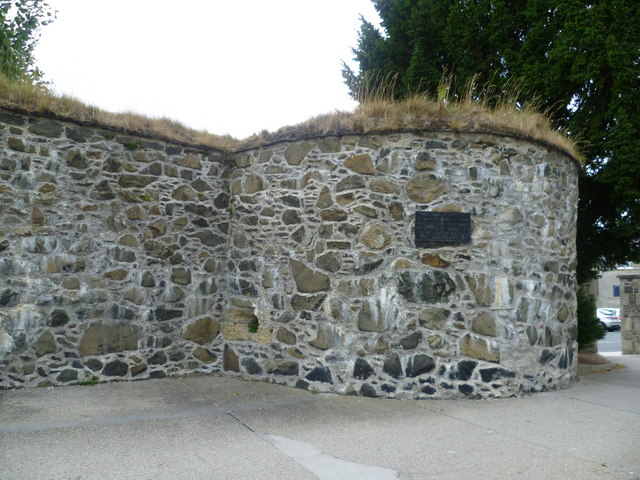
Remains of the town wall corner bastion

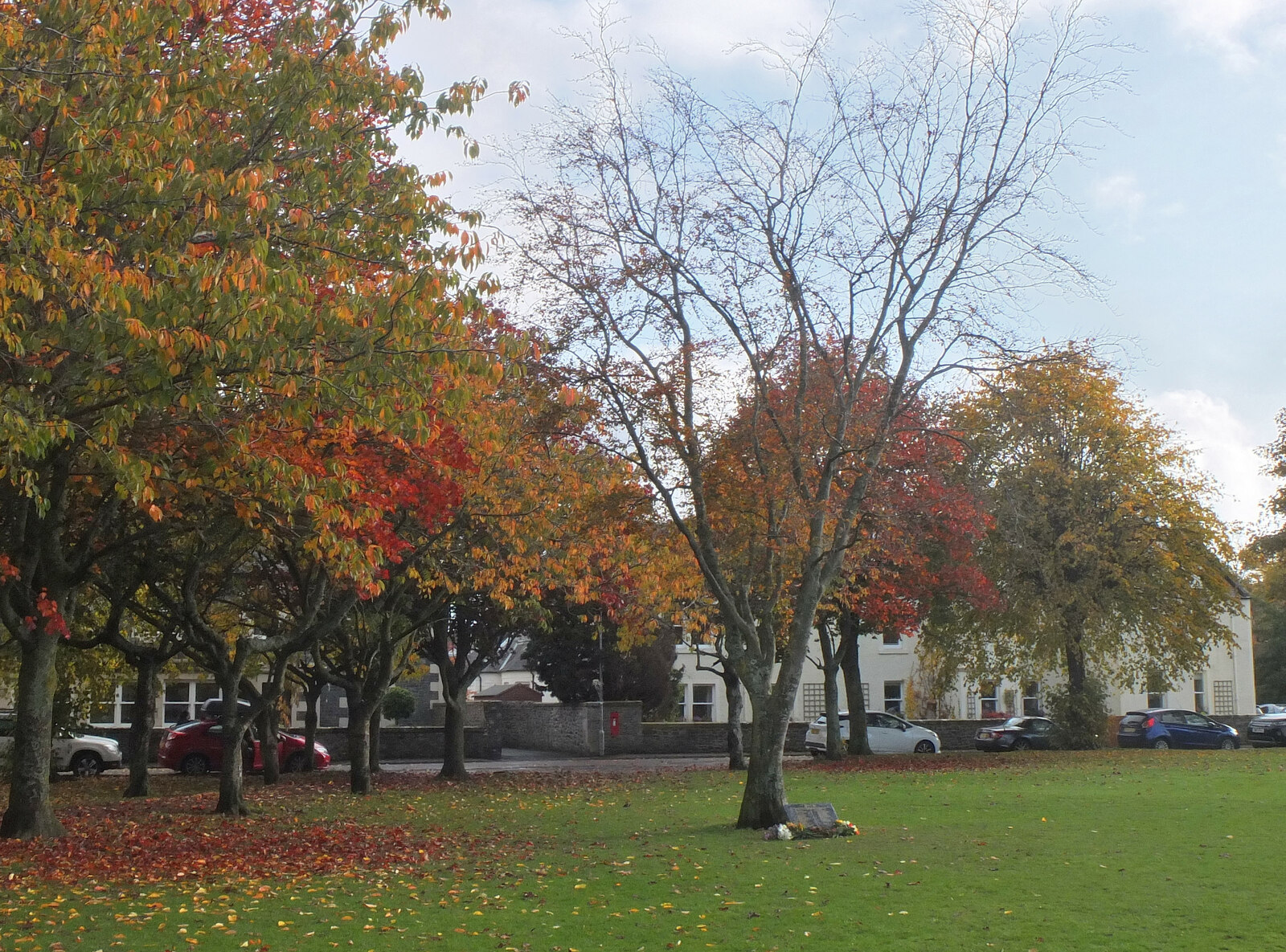
Witch hunt commemorative plaque on Tweed Green

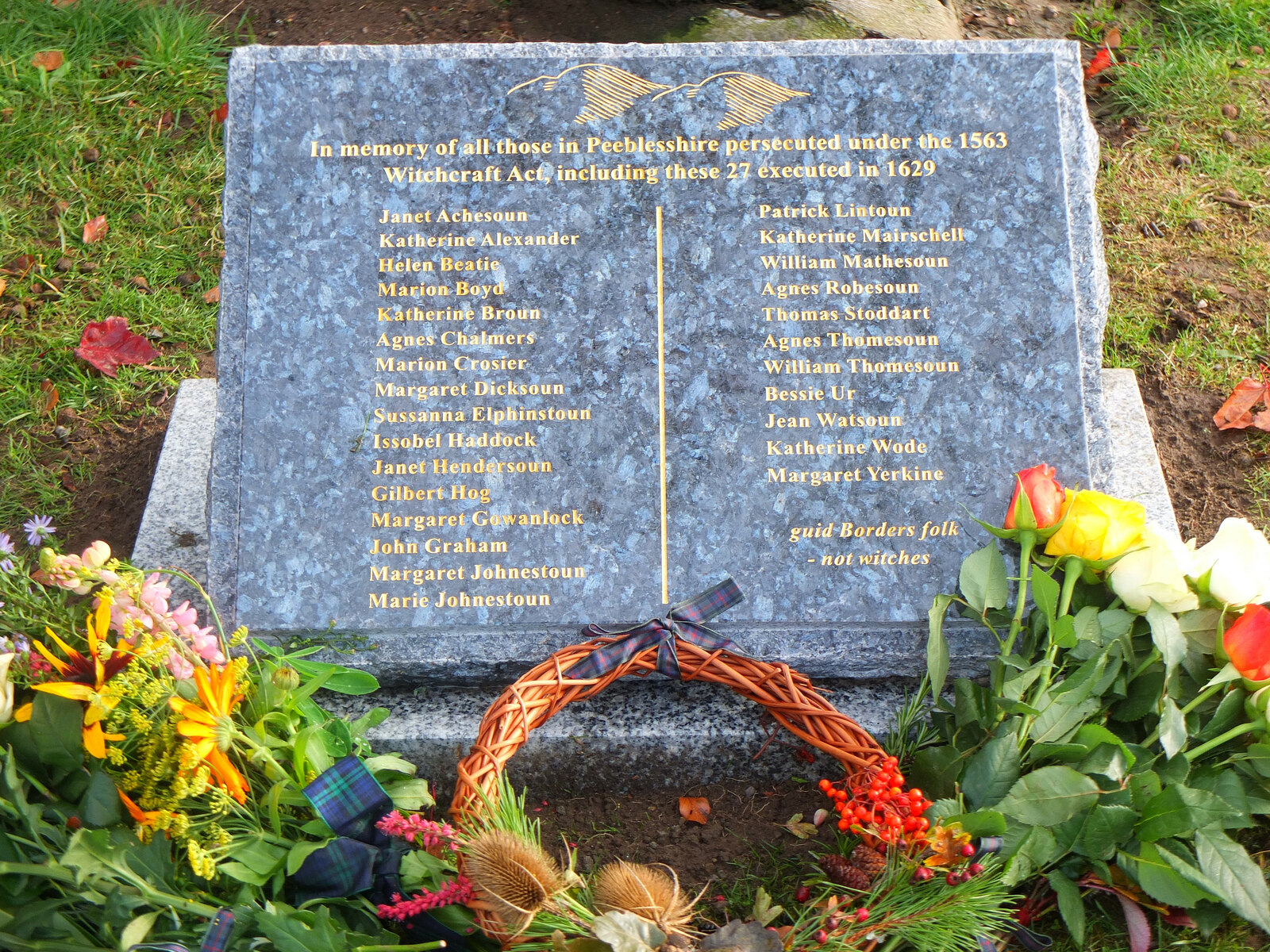
Commemorative plaque reads: "In memory of all those in Peeblesshire persecuted under the 1563 Witchcraft Act including these 27 executed in 1629"

== See also ==
- List of town defences in Scotland
