= Marot (name) =

Marot is a surname, and may refer to:

- Bernard Marot (fl. 1610–1650), French surgeon and ship's captain
- Clément Marot (1496–1544), French poet
- Daniel Marot (1661–1752), French Protestant architect, furniture designer and engraver
- Helen Marot (1865–1940), American writer, librarian, and labor organizer
- Irene Marot (born 1951), British actress
- Jean Marot (1463–c.1526), French poet, father of Clément
- Jean Marot (architect) (1619–1679), French architect and engraver of architectural views
- Károly Marót (1885–1963), Hungarian classical scholar and philologist
- Péter Marót (born 1945), Hungarian fencer
- Véronique Marot (born 1955), French marathon runner

and to:

- Marót, the Hungarian name for Moroda village, Seleuș Commune, Arad County, Romania

== See also ==
- Maret (disambiguation)
- Marriott (disambiguation)
- Merit (disambiguation)
