= David Ballantyne (cricketer) =

Scottish cricketer

Personal information
- Full name: David Ballantyne
- Born: 31 October 1914; Peebles, Peeblesshire, Scotland
- Died: 27 November 1997 (aged 83); Peebles, Peeblesshire, Scotland
- Batting: Right-handed

Domestic team information
- Years: Team
- 1937: Scotland

Career statistics
Competition	First-class
Matches	1
Runs scored	11
Batting average	5.50
100s/50s	–/–
Top score	10
Catches/stumpings	–/–
- Source: Cricinfo, 5 July 2022

David Ballantyne (31 October 1914 – 27 November 1997) was a Scottish first-class cricketer.

Ballantyne was born at Peebles in October 1914 and was educated in Edinburgh at the independent Merchiston Castle School. A club cricketer for Peebles County Cricket Club and Grange Cricket Club, he made a single appearance in first-class cricket for Scotland against Ireland at Belfast in 1937. Batting twice in the match as an opening batsman, he was dismissed for 10 runs in the Scotland first innings by Charles Billingsley, while in their second innings he was dismissed for a single run by Henry Morgan. Outside of cricket, Ballantyne was an accountant and a company secretary for a woollen manufacturer. He died at Peebles in November 1997.
