= Marian Moszoro =

Polish economist

Marian W. Moszoro
- Born: September 14, 1974 (age 52); Rosario, Argentina
- Education: University of Szczecin; Warsaw School of Economics
- Occupation: Economist
- Employer: International Monetary Fund
- Known for: Public-private partnerships, infrastructure finance

Marian Moszoro Մարիան Մոշորո (born September 14, 1974) is a Polish economist. In 2005-2006 he was undersecretary of state and deputy minister of finance of Poland.

== Biography ==
Marian Moszoro was born in Rosario, Argentina. He graduated from SGH – Warsaw School of Economics (PhD in financial economics, 2004) and the Haas School of Business, University of California, Berkeley (post-doc, 2009–2011, under Nobel laureate economist Oliver E. Williamson). He held academic positions at the Haas School of Business, University of California, Berkeley, Harvard Law School, and Université Paris-Dauphine. Currently (2017), Moszoro is a professor at George Mason University’s Department of Economics and the Interdisciplinary Center for Economic Science, and a faculty affiliate at Cornell University's Program in Infrastructure Policy. Moszoro served as consultant to the World Bank, UNIDO, and several companies.

== Research issues ==
Moszoro’s dissertation on Public-Private Partnerships was published as a monograph with two editions. He has authored several books, scientific articles, and case studies. His areas of research are: law and economics and positive political economy, corporate and project finance, and public-private partnerships.
