= Thierry Aimar =

Economist

Thierry Aimar (born 1966) is a French specialist of the Austrian School of Economics and History of Economic Thought.

== Biography ==
Aimar is assistant Professor of Economics at Sciences Po, Paris and the Nancy 2 University; he also teaches at Paris Dauphine University and ESSEC. He concentrates his research and writings on the Austrian School of Economics, extending to entrepreneurial and market processes, the economics of Knowledge and the Information economics as well as the psychology of decision-making.

== Published works ==
- 1994, Le rôle de l’information dans la pensée économique autrichienne - Contribution à une lecture transversale de la théorie autrichienne, Thèse de doctorat ès Sciences économiques, under the direction of André Lapidus, University of Paris 1 Pantheon-Sorbonne.
- 1996, Money and Uncertainty in the Economic Thought of Carl Menger, in Uncertainty in Economic Thought, Cheltenham (UK), Edward Elgar Publisher, 1996, pp. 100–112.
- 1998, L’économie autrichienne du bien-être : quelle définition possible ? , Revue d’Economie Politique, September–October 1998, n°5, pp. 691–709.
- 1998, Ludwig von Mises et la tradition néo-autrichienne, in Histoire de la Pensée Economique (La période d’après-guerre), INFRA-M (Moscow, Russia), 1998, pp. 179–196.
- 1999, Ethique versus coordination ? Une controverse autrichienne soulevée par Rothbard, Revue Economique, March 1999, volume 50, n°2, pp. 301–321.
- 1999, Time, Coordination and Ignorance : a Comparison between Hayek and Lachmann, History of Economic Ideas, VII/ 1999/1-2, June 1999, pp. 139–167.
- 2001
  - Coordination, Survival and Normativity : a Hayekian Perspective Revisited, in Hayek as a Political Economist, New York City, London, Routledge, 2001.
  - Hayek as a Political Economist (ed T. Aimar, J. Birner, P. Garrouste), New York, London, Routledge, 2001, ISBN 978-0-415-22622-6, 246p.
  - NTIC et organisation de l’espace public : les nouveaux enjeux de l’aménagement du territoire, in Démocratie et Management Local, Dalloz September 2001, >ISBN 978-2-247-04684-3 pp. 621–631.
- 2002, Traduction et commentaire de Economics and Knowledge [F.A. Hayek 1937], Cahiers d’Economie Politique, n°43, 2002, pp. 105–134.
- 2002, Commentaire sur économie et connaissance de Friedrich A. Hayek (1937), Cahiers d’économie politique, n°43, ISBN 2-7475-3531-2; pp. 105–118.
- 2004, Time Coordination and Ignorance : A Comparison Between Hayek and Lachmann, in John C. Wood et Robert D. Wood, dir., Friedrich A. Hayek. Critical Assessments of leading Economists, New York : Routledge.
- 2005, Les apports de l’école autrichienne d'économie – Subjectivisme, ignorance et coordination, Paris, Vuibert, Collection : Économie, ISBN 2-7117-7519-4; p. 315
- 2006
  - Jeux évolutionnistes, processus d’apprentissage et équilibres stochastiques, une application à l’économie des conventions chez Hayek, Revue d’Economie Politique, 116, n°5, 633- 656.
  - Golden-boss : patrons ou rentiers ?, Paris, Editions Eyrolles, ISBN 2-7081-3752-2; 116p.
  - L’actualité théorique de la pensée économique autrichienne, Sociétal, n°53, pp. 25–30.
- 2007, Manager, entrepreneur et esprit d’entreprise: la question des rémunérations patronales, Sociétal, n°56, 2^{e} quarter, 66–72.
- 2008
  - Self-Ignorance, Towards an Extension of the Austrian Paradigm, in Review of Austrian Economics, vol. 21- n°1, pp. 23–43.
  - Economie et psychologie, une réflexion autrichienne sur l’organisation de l’esprit, in Revue Française d’Economie, n°3, vol. XXI, 189–222.
  - Les nouveaux horizons de l’école autrichienne d’économie, Revue Française d’Economie, edition under the responsibility of Thierry Aimar, n°4, vol. XXII.
  - Kirzner et Rothbard : La filière misesienne de l’entrepreneur autrichien, in Histoire de la pensée économique du XXème siècle, INFRA-M, Moscow, Russia.
  - Les curieux destins d’une hétérodoxie : la tradition autrichienne d’économie, in Revue Française d’Economie, April, n°4, vol. XXII, 4–17.
- 2009
  - The Economics of Ignorance and Coordination, Subjectivism and the Austrian School of Economics, Cheltenham, UK, Brookfields, US, Edward Elgar, ISBN 1-84844-104-5; 320 pages.
  - The Curious Destiny of the Austrian School, Review of Austrian Economics, volume 22, Number 3, 199–207.
- 2010
  - How did Austrian economics thrive outside of Vienna : the case of French political economy, with Laurent Dobuzinskis, In: Roger Koppl and Steven Horwitz, dir., What is so Austrian about Austrian Economics? (Advances in Austrian Economics, Volume 14), Emerald Group Publishing Limited, pp87–111
  - Le cycle économique, une synthèse (The Economic cycle, a synthesis), Revue Française d'Economie, volume XXXIV, n°4, avril, p. 3-65.
  - L'école autrichienne d'économie, une problématique de l'ignorance : du subjectivisme à la neuroéconomie (The Austrian school of economy, a problem of the ignorance : from subjectivism to neuroeconomy), Bilan/Essai, Revue d'Economie Politique, n°4, juillet-août, pp. 591–622.
- 2011, Cognitive Opening and Closing: Towards a Mental Exploration of Entrepreneurship, in Leslie March (ed) Hayek in Mind: Hayek's Philosophical Psychology, Advances in Austrian Economics, Volume 15, Emerald Group Publishing Limited, pp. 241–257.
- 2019, Hayek, du cerveau à l'économie, coll. Le bien commun, Michalon, 2019 ISBN 9782841869060.
