= Guillaume Carlier =

French applied mathematician

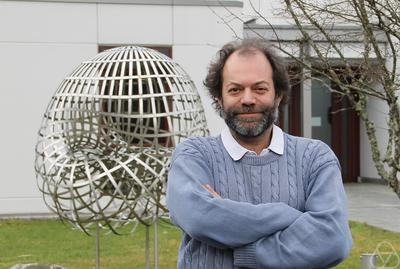
- Carlier in Oberwolfach, 2024
- Education: Paris Dauphine University
- Scientific career
- Fields: Applied mathematics
- Workplaces: Paris Dauphine University
- Doctoral advisor: Ivar Ekeland

Guillaume Carlier is a French mathematician. Most of his work lies in the field of calculus of variation and optimization. He is a professor of applied mathematics at Paris Dauphine University and a researcher at Mokaplan, a joint INRIA-CNRS-Université Paris-Dauphine team dedicated to research in the field of optimal transport.

== Life and work ==
Carlier's work mainly focuses on applied mathematics, in particular in the fields of calculus of variations, optimization, convex analysis, and transportation theory as well as their application to economics and traffic modelling.

He graduated in mathematics and mathematical economics from ENSAE ParisTech, Pierre and Marie Curie University, and Paris-Dauphine University in 1996. He then completed his PhD at Paris-Dauphine University in 2000, with a dissertation on the applications of calculus of variations to contract theory, under the supervision of Ivar Ekeland. After his studies, he was an assistant professor at the University of Bordeaux and then moved to Paris-Dauphine University, where he is now a professor. He is a member of Mokaplan, a joint research unit co-sponsored by Paris-Dauphine University, the National Centre for Scientific Research, and the French Institute for Research in Computer Science and Automation.

== Selected publications ==
- Agueh, Martial; Carlier, Guillaume (2011). "Barycenters in the Wasserstein Space". SIAM Journal on Mathematical Analysis. 43 (2). Society for Industrial and Applied Mathematics: 904–924. doi:10.1137/100805741. S2CID 8592977.
- Benamou, Jean-David; Carlier, Guillaume (2015). "Augmented Lagrangian Methods for Transport Optimization, Mean Field Games and Degenerate Elliptic Equations". Journal of Optimization Theory and Applications. 167. Springer: 1–26. doi:10.1007/s10957-015-0725-9. S2CID 254741013.
- Benamou, Jean-David; Carlier, Guillaume; Cuturi, Marco; Nenna, Luca; Peyré, Gabriel (2015). "Iterative Bregman Projections for Regularized Transportation Problems". SIAM Journal on Scientific Computing. 37 (2). Society for Industrial and Applied Mathematics: A1111–A1138. arXiv:1412.5154. doi:10.1137/141000439. S2CID 12631372.
- Carlier, Guillaume (2001). "A general existence result for the principal-agent problem with adverse selection". Journal of Mathematical Economics. 35. Elsevier: 129–150. doi:10.1016/S0304-4068(00)00057-4.
- Carlier, Guillaume; Ekeland, Ivar (2010). "Matching for teams". Economic Theory. 42 (2). Springer: 397–418. doi:10.1007/s00199-008-0415-z. S2CID 56567818.
- Carlier, Guillaume; Duval, Vincent; Peyré, Gabriel; Schmitzer, Bernhard (2017). "Convergence of Entropic Schemes for Optimal Transport and Gradient Flows". SIAM Journal on Mathematical Analysis. 49 (2). Society for Industrial and Applied Mathematics: 1385–1418. arXiv:1512.02783. doi:10.1137/15M1050264. S2CID 46156175.
- Carlier, Guillaume; Galichon, Alfred; Santambrogio, Filippo (2010). "From Knothe's transport to Brenier's map and a continuation method for optimal transport". SIAM Journal on Mathematical Analysis. 41 (6). Society for Industrial and Applied Mathematics: 2554–2576. arXiv:0810.4153. doi:10.1137/080740647. S2CID 15795393.
- Chaudhari, Pratik; Oberman, Adam; Osher, Stanley; Soatto, Stefano; Carlier, Stefano (2018). "Deep relaxation: partial differential equations for optimizing deep neural networks". Research in the Mathematical Sciences. 5 (3). Springer. arXiv:1704.04932. doi:10.1007/s40687-018-0148-y. S2CID 2074215.
