= Ernest Maylard =

Scottish surgeon

Alfred Ernest Maylard FRSE PRCPSG FSGS (1855–1947) was born in Northfleet, Kent, England but is known as a Scottish surgeon and expert in abdominal surgery who served as president of the Royal College of Physicians and Surgeons of Glasgow. He was the eldest son of Alfred Martin Maylard, a respected London merchant and Ellen Mira French Maylard. A keen mountaineer, he was also co-founder (with William Naismith) of the Scottish Mountaineering Club in 1889. In authorship he is referred to as A. E. Maylard.

== Life ==
He was born in 1855.

He studied medicine at the University of London, graduating MB ChB. He then worked as a demonstrator in the Anatomy Department of Glasgow University.

When the Victoria Infirmary opened in Glasgow in 1890, he was its principal surgeon alongside Robert Henry Parry. In 1907, Maylard and a colleague modified the Pfannenfstiel incision and the subsequent Maylard incision (used during abdominal surgery) is attributed to him.

In 1917 he was elected a Fellow of the Royal Society of Edinburgh. His proposers were Frederick Orpen Bower, Thomas Hastie Bryce, Sir John Graham Kerr and John Walter Gregory.

He died at Kingsmuir near Peebles on 27 June 1947. He is buried in Peebles Parish Churchyard.

== Publications ==
- Climbing Considered on its Physiological Aspects
- Walks Around Peebles
- Memories and Musings of a Hospital Surgeon (1920)
- The Glasgow Infirmaries (1933)

== Family ==
He was married to Jane Reddie. The couple had no children.
