= Nicolas Bouzou =

French liberal essayist

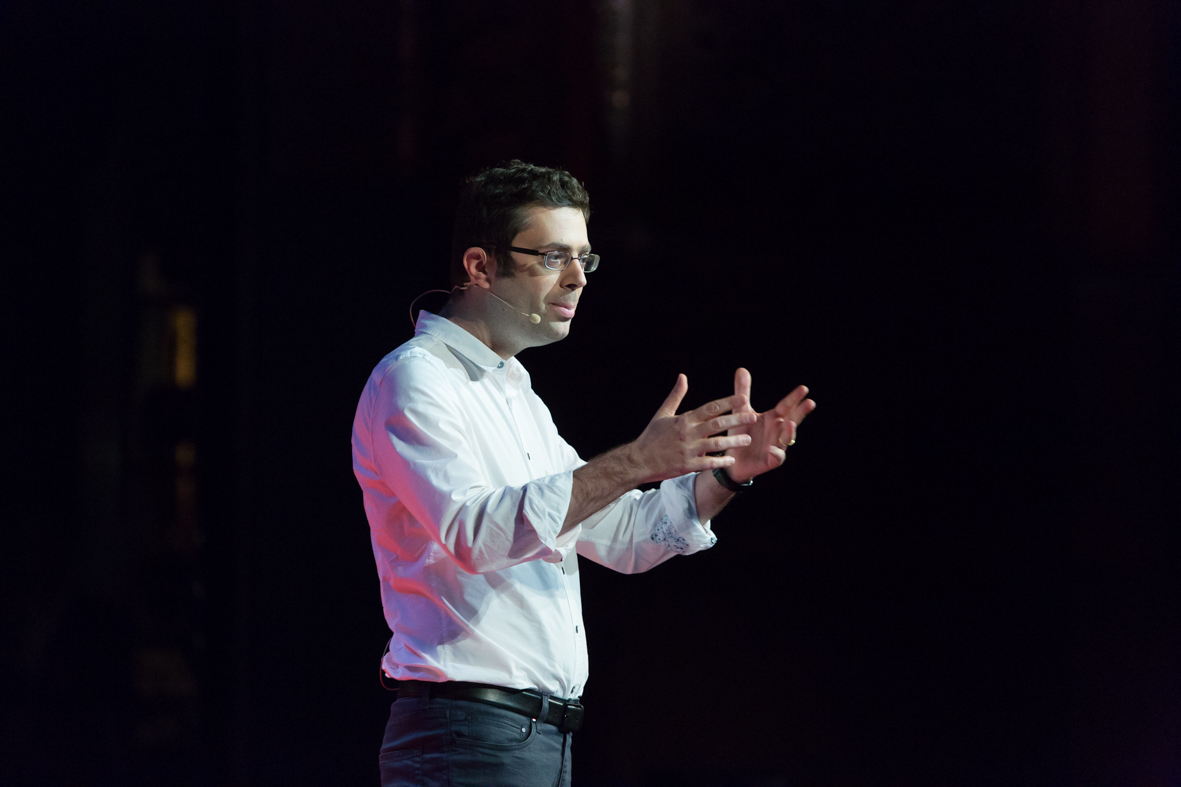
- Nicolas Bouzou in 2015
- Born: 26 August 1976 (age 50); Boulogne-Billancourt, France
- Education: Paris Dauphine University; Sciences Po
- Occupation: Economist

Nicolas Bouzou (born 26 August 1976) is a French liberal economist and essayist. A frequent participant in the media, he is also an entrepreneur.

== Biography ==
Nicolas Bouzou is a graduate of Paris Dauphine University and Sciences Po with a Master's in Finance.

His work focuses on economic growth, economic policy, territorial organization and health. He is the research director and a lecturer in the Master 2 and MBA Business Law and Management-Management at the School of Law and Management at the Panthéon-Assas University.

In 2006, he founded the consulting firm Asterès which publishes economic studies for public actors and companies.

He is vice-president of the cercle Turgot, which brings together liberal leaders of major companies and political leaders. He was also a member of the Conseil d'Analyse Sociale (2010-2011). In 2017, he was appointed Chief Economist of the Franco-German Committee for Cultural and Creative Industries.

In 2018, Nicolas Bouzou becomes President of the "Rencontres de l’avenir", a think tank organized in partnership with the city of Saint-Raphaël. The 2019 edition of the Rencontres de l’avenir brought together some 30 speakers and more than 10,000 participants during three days of conferences.

Nicolas Bouzou has published numerous works, some of which were written collaboratively. His book, co-authored with Julia de Funès, La Comédie (In)humaine, has sold more than 50,000 copies.

In his latest publication L’amour augmenté, Nicolas Bouzou discusses the issues of fidelity and infidelity with couples, the role of dating sites and the changing place of marriage and sex in society. In this book, Nicolas Bouzou particularly defends medically assisted procreation (MAP) and ethical surrogacy as well as homosexual marriage.

== Positions ==
In 2017, he published Le travail est l’avenir de l’homme, within which he discusses the fear of unemployment induced by the arrival of robots and artificial intelligence. For Nicolas Bouzou, this is an unavoidable fear, which was already present, for example, at the beginning of the 19th century, when British textile workers destroyed looms. According to him, labor will not disappear, it will mutate. He states:

“The most robotized countries, such as Denmark, Germany and South Korea, are also the closest to achieving full employment.”

In Septembre 2017, he approved President Emmanuel Macron’s policy, notably with the reform of the French labor code, which, according to him, will be able to reduce mass unemployment if it is associated with a very significant effort in terms of vocational training: “There is no point in allowing companies to create jobs if people are not able to occupy them.” He also supports the government's pension reforms: “It is clear that [the reform] is redistributive: the losers are the high income earners, the winners are the precarious ones. It’s a left-wing reform! But to say that, you have to know how to read and be honest.”

In June 2019, he stated that the hospitals of the future “will need to be run by bold entrepreneurs, rather than prudent managers.” He also predicts the same year that “in 2019, we will suffer a violent stock market crash. It’s almost certain, the probability is close to 100%.”

He advocates for the reduction of public spending, the number of civil servants, and taxes for businesses and the wealthy. In particular, he suggests abolishing the solidarity tax on wealth and increasing very significantly the IRPP [Personal Income Tax] deductions linked to investments in small and medium-sized enterprises (SMEs).

In 2022, it was revealed that Nicolas Bouzou was paid 10 000 eur to produce a report supporting Uber's expansion in France, in 2016.

== Media presence ==
Nicolas Bouzou is a regular contributor to Le Figaro, Les Échos, the Financial Times (UK) and Le Temps (Geneva) (3). He is an editorial writer for L'Express for which he publishes a weekly column.

From 2011 to 2013, he appeared in Canal+'s La Matinale with Maïtena Biraben and Ariane Massenet. Between 2013 and 2014, he intervened in Team Toussaint with Bruce Toussaint.

He regularly appears in the programs C dans l'air on France 5, 28 minutes on Arte, / 24H Pujadas LCI, L'Info du vrai on Canal+, 19H Ruth Elkrief on BFMTV, Les décodeurs de l'éco on BFM Business, on Radio Classique in Accords / désaccords (18) with Guillaume Durand.

According to Le Figaro, Nicolas Bouzou is a regular guest economist on television programs requiring commentary. The publication notes the style of his arguments and his method of explaining complex subjects.

== Publications ==
- Les Mécanismes du marché: Éléments de microéconomie, 2006, ISBN 2749506336
- Petit précis d'économie appliquée à l'usage du citoyen pragmatique, Eyrolles, 2007 ISBN 221253826X
- Krach financier: emploi, crédits, impôts, ce qui va changer pour vous, Eyrolles, 2008 ISBN 2212542569
- Le Capitalisme idéal, Eyrolles, 2010 ISBN 2212545517
- Le Chagrin des classes moyennes, J-C Lattès, 2011 ISBN 2709636514
- On entend l'arbre tomber mais pas la forêt pousser, J-C Lattès, 2013 ISBN 2709642352
- Pourquoi la lucidité habite à l'étranger, J-C Lattès, 2015 ISBN 978-2-7096-4773-1
- Le Grand Refoulement. Stop à la démission démocratique, Plon, 2015 ISBN 9782259230278
- L'innovation sauvera le monde. Philosophie pour une planète pacifique, durable et prospère, Plon, 2016 ISBN 9782259249423
- Le travail est l'avenir de l'homme, Éditions de l'Observatoire, 2017 ISBN 979-10-329-0030-7
- La Comédie (in)humaine, co-écrit avec Julia de Funès, Éditions de l'Observatoire, 2018 ISBN 979-10-329-0396-4
- Sagesse et folie du monde qui vient. Comment s’y préparer, comment y préparer nos enfants, co-écrit avec Luc Ferry, XO Editions, 2019 ISBN 2374480402
- Inventons la mondialisation de demain, Éditions de l'Observatoire, 2020
- L'amour augmentée. Nos enfants et nos amours au XXI^{e} siècle, Éditions de l'Observatoire, 2020.
- Homo Sanitas, XO Editions, 2021.
