= Bertrand Lemennicier =

French economist (1943–2019)

- Born: 15 October 1943; Paris, France
- Died: 16 December 2019 (aged 76); Saint-Cloud, France
- Education: Paris Dauphine University; Paris 1 Panthéon-Sorbonne University; University of Nantes
- Occupation: Economist
- Organizations: Paris Dauphine University; Pantheon-Assas University; ESSEC Business School
- Known for: Economic analysis of law; Public choice economics; Austrian Economics; Libertarianism
- Children: 2

Bertrand Lemennicier (15 October 1943 – 16 December 2019) was a French economist, expert in public choice economics and economic analysis of law. He was a member of the American Economic Association as well as of the Mont Pelerin Society.

== Biography ==
Lemennicier was born on 15 October 1943 in Paris. After a master's degree in econometrics, and as a student of professor Pascal Salin, he obtained a doctorate in applied economics in 1971. He then received a state doctorate in economics in 1975, and an agrégation in economics in 1987.

Lecturer at Paris Dauphine University as well as at ESSEC Business School, he was a professor of economics at Pantheon-Assas University and at the University of Lille.

He was a member of the jury for the first aggregation competition in economics in 2003 under the chairmanship of Pascal Salin.

The influences of Professor Lemennicier include economists such as Friedrich Hayek, Milton Friedman, Ronald Coase, James M. Buchanan, Gary Becker, Richard Allen Posner, Ludwig von Mises and Murray Rothbard and philosophers Ayn Rand and Robert Nozick.

He helped his students rediscover the writings of Frederic Bastiat, a French economist celebrated as a major economist in the United States but long forgotten in France, and initiated them to public choice theory and to economic analysis of law, fields often neglected in French universities.

Lemennicier is also known for teaching his students to think critically when using economic and econometric models and to analyse any specific ideology underpinning them.

Foreseeing the negative impacts of implementing a bureaucratic Europe, he is part of the economist manifesto in favour of the “no to the Maastricht Treaty” .

== Works ==
- L'Aide aux étudiants en France : faits et critique (1977)
- Fiscalité, para-fiscalité et offre de travail féminin (1984)
- Le Marché du mariage et de la famille (1988)
- Cinq questions sur les syndicats (1990)
- Économie du droit (1991)
- Tabac, l'histoire d'une imposture : enquête sur le complot anti-fumeurs (1994)
- L'OMS : bateau ivre de la santé publique : les dérives et les échecs de l'agence des Nations unies (2000)
- La Morale face à l'économie (2005)
- Les Mythes de l'insécurité routière (2016)
- Privatisons la justice : une solution radicale à une justice inefficace et injuste (2017)
