= Marion Laboure =

French economist

- Born: Marion Laboure
- Citizenship: French
- Education: Université Paris Dauphine - PSL; Ecole normale supérieure; The London School of Economics and Political Science (LSE)
- Occupations: Senior Economist at Deutsche Bank; Lecturer at Harvard University

Marion Laboure is a French economist, macro strategist and a lecturer. She currently works as a macro strategist at Deutsche Bank, London. She is also a lecturer at Harvard University in Economics and Finance.

== Early life and education ==
Marion Laboure completed her bachelor’s degree in mathematics, economics, and finance from the University of Paris Dauphine. She further completed her Master of Research in economics from The London School of Economics and Political Science (LSE). She earned her Ph.D. in the field of econometrics and quantitative economics from the École Normale Superieure (ENS Ulm).

== Career ==
After completing her master's degree from the London School of Economics, Laboure started her career at the Bureau of European Policy Advisers, which works as an advisor to the president of the European Commission José Manuel Barroso from Portugal.

She joined Barclays investment bank in Paris and London as an economist in 2010. In 2012 she joined the Central Bank of Luxembourg as an economist. After completing her PhD, she joined Harvard University as a lecturer in finance and economics. During this time, she received first prize from the American Society of Actuaries, Revue Banque nominated her as a rising star in finance, she is part of the 45 standout women in fintech, and Business Insider named her a cryptocurrency mastermind.

== Books ==
- Democratizing Finance: The Radical Promise of Fintech. Harvard University Press. April 5, 2022. p. 288. ISBN 978-0674987227.
- Agnew, Julie; Mitchell, Olivia S., eds. (29 August 2019). The Disruptive Impact of FinTech on Retirement Systems. Oxford University Press. doi:10.1093/oso/9780198845553.001.0001. ISBN 9780191880728.
- Fintech: La finance pour tous. ECONOMICA. October 3, 2019. p. 312. ISBN 978-2717870879.
- Investissement et structure de capital (FINANCE). ECONOMICA. October 4, 2017. p. 192. ISBN 978-2717869798.

== Personal life ==
Laboure has studied music theory and piano for 12 years at the Conservatory. She received the 2nd prize of the National competition.
