= Marnie Fogg =

Marnie Fogg is a media consultant in all aspects of the fashion industry. She has a Master’s Degree in Art and Design Advanced practice and theory. She has lectured in Visual Studies and the Culture of Fashion and the University of Nottingham.

She is the author of over 25 books on fashion and related subjects including: The Dress: 100 Ideas that Changed Fashion Forever, Vintage Handbags: Collecting and Wearing Designer Classics, Vintage Weddings, Vintage Fashion Illustration from Harper’s Bazaar 1930 - 1970, and a series of books “Vintage Patterns” that cover the decades 1920’s thru 1980’s.

== Selected works ==
- — (2003). Boutique: A '60s Cultural Phenomenon. London: Mitchell Beazley. ISBN 978-1-84000-621-6.
- — (2006). Print in Fashion: Design and Development in Fashion Textiles. London: Batsford. ISBN 978-0-7134-9012-1.
- — (2007). Couture Interiors. Laurence King. ISBN 978-1-85669-535-0.
- — (2018). The Art of the Tea Towel: Over 100 of the Best Designs. Batsford. ISBN 978-1-84994-502-8.
