= Marioun Twedy =

- Died: Peebles
- Years active: 1640s
- Known for: Accused of witchcraft

Marioun Twedy or Marion Tweedy was accused of witchcraft in Peebles in the Scottish Borders in 1649. She was accused of causing the death of a woman and her child and of using charms to cure animals. She refused to confess to these accusations. However, the witchpricker condemned her for finding 'the devil's mark' on her.

== Biography ==
Twedy is recorded as having resided in the parish of Kirkurd in the Presbytery of Peebles. She was arrested and incarcerated in the prison in Peebles on 17 May 1649.

The Presbytery requested a witchcraft commission be approved by the Committee of Estates to investigate the allegations against her in September 1649.

=== Accusations ===
The allegations included that she had given advice about a cow giving blood. The charm/cure she had advised was she told her neighbour to take the blood "three times withershins about her house then pour it into a hole in the ground". Another allegation centred on Twedy being the cause a house burning down and the deaths of all the animals inside it.

She was also alleged to have predicted a child's accident and caused it. The mother of the child died subsequently too and the husband, seeking someone to blame for his misfortune, accused Twedy of both. He attributed the cause of her 'maleficium' to be that he had in the past refused to marry Twedy's daughter.

== Witchpricker ==
Despite all the charges and the suffering caused during her months of incarceration and interrogation, Twedy would not confess to anything other than having done a little charming. The Presbytery turned to a local woman, Agnes Stuart, who advised them to seek the services of a witchpricker known to be working in other areas.

George Cathie of Tranent in East Lothian was brought in as the witchpricker to find out through the pricking of her skin with a needle or bodkin if there were areas that would not bleed and thereby showing evidence of 'the devil's mark'. On 11 October 1649, he did indeed determine there was a 'devil's mark' on Twedy's body and her fate was sealed.

The witch trial of Marioun Twedy took place in Peebles on 21 November 1649. She had 6 female accusers and 1 male accuser and there is no record of someone acting in her defence. It is recorded that she refused to confess but there is no record of what happened to her after the trial.

== Cultural representations and commemorations ==
Twedy's investigation features in the play, Prick, by Laurie Flanigan Hegge and directed by Meggie Greivell which dramatises her story, that of Isobel Gowdie, and other "sundry witches" from the nearly 4000 accused in the Scottish Witch Trials and recorded in the Survey of Scottish Witchcraft.

A commemorative plaque was unveiled in Tweed Green, Peebles to remember those that lost their lives in the Peebles witch hunts

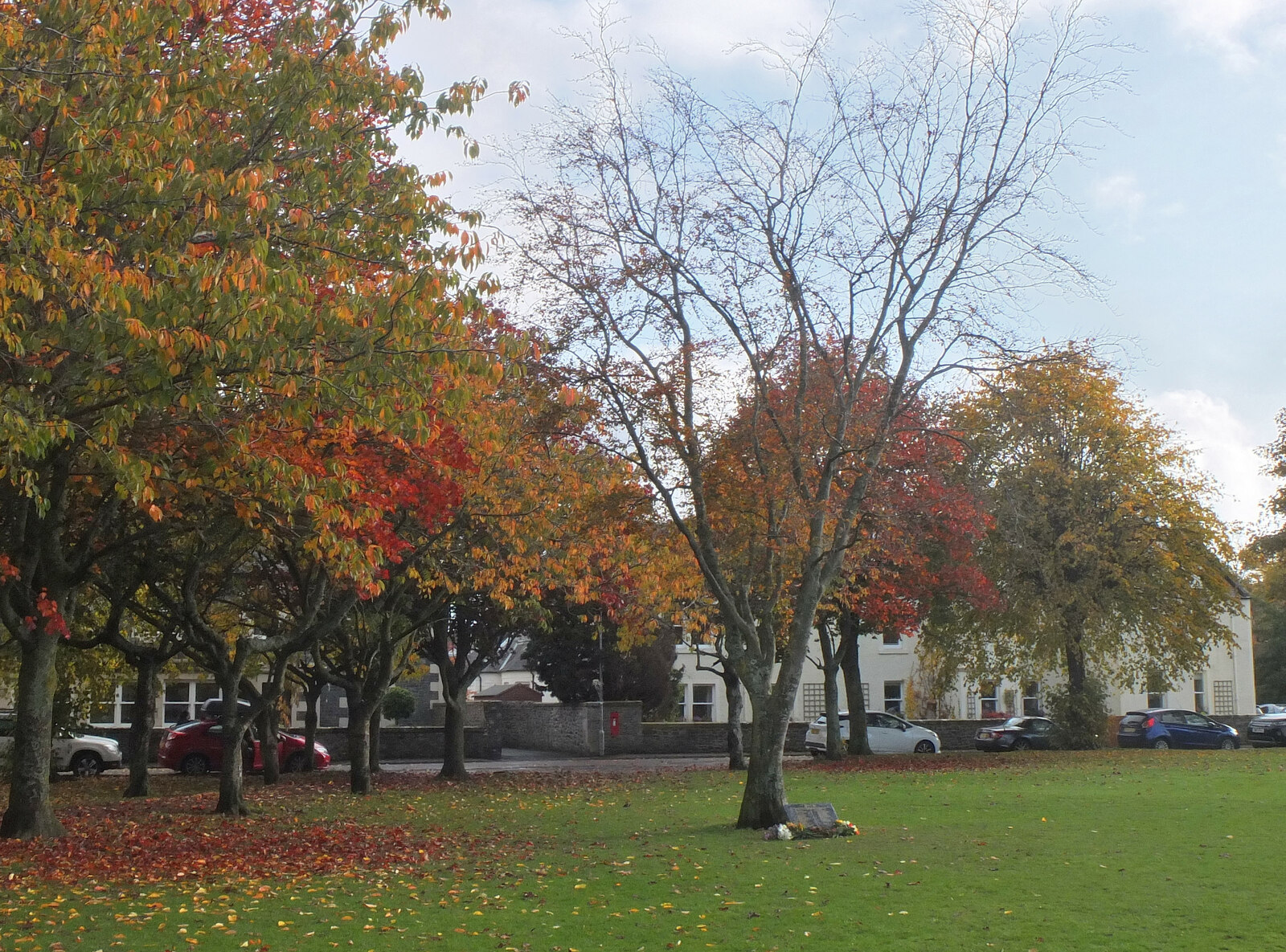

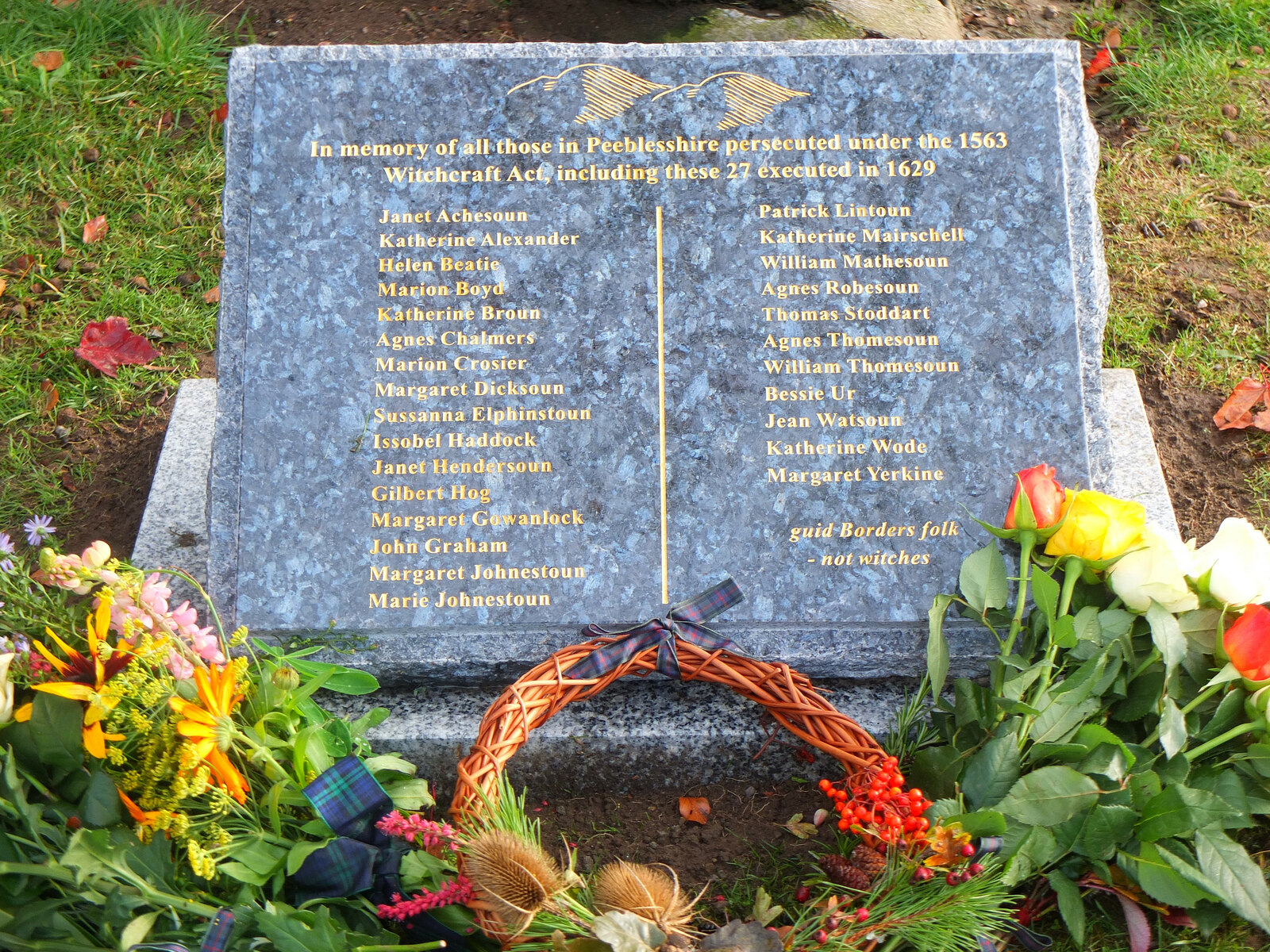
