= Paris Dauphine-PSL University =

French university based in Paris

Paris Dauphine University - PSL
- Université Paris Dauphine - PSL
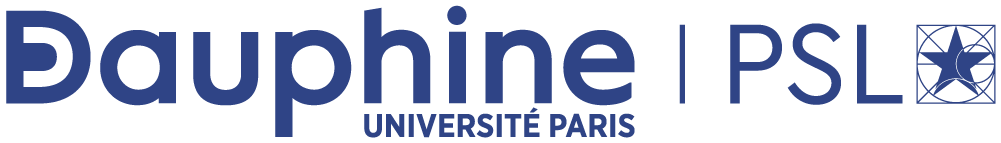
- Type: Grand établissement (EPSCP), College, Grande école
- Established: 1968 (as Centre Universitaire Dauphine) 1970 (as Université Paris IX Dauphine) 2004 (as Université Paris Dauphine)
- Parent institution: PSL University
- Affiliations: Chancellery of the Universities of Paris; Conférence des grandes écoles, Couperin consortium, EQUIS
- Budget: €116 million (2022)
- President: Bruno Bouchard
- Faculty: 579 (2020)
- Administrative staff: 517 (2020)
- Students: 9,400
- Location: Paris; International campus: London, Tunis
- Campus: Urban
- Website: dauphine.psl.eu

Paris Dauphine-PSL University (French: Université Paris Dauphine-PSL) is a Grande École and public institution of higher education and research based in Paris, France, constituent college of PSL University. As of 2022, Dauphine has 9,400 students in 8 fields of study (law, economics, finance, computer science, journalism, management, mathematics, social sciences), plus 3,800 in executive education. Its status as a grand établissement, adopted in 2004, allows it to select its students. On average, 90 to 95% of accepted students received either high distinctions or the highest distinctions at their French High School National Exam results (Examen National du Baccalauréat). Dauphine is also a member of the Conférence des Grandes Écoles.. Its main campus is based in the former North Atlantic Treaty Organization (NATO) building.

Research at Dauphine concerns "organization and decision sciences", organized in 6 research laboratories (5 of which are mixed units also staffed by CNRS researchers): the CEREMADE Center for Research in Decision Mathematics, the CR2D Dauphine Law Research Center, DRM Dauphine Management Research, the IRISSO Interdisciplinary Research Institute in Social Science, the LAMSADE Laboratory for Analysis and Modeling of Decision Support Systems, and the LEDa Dauphine Economics Laboratory. A total of 519 research staff work at Dauphine.

== History ==
Dauphine was founded on 24 October 1968 as a university center with the status of a faculty, named Centre universitaire Dauphine. On 17 December 1970, as part of the division of the ancient University of Paris into 13 universities, it became an "établissement public à caractère scientifique et culturel", named Université Paris IX Dauphine.

The university was established in the Palais Dauphine, also known as the Palais de l'OTAN ("NATO Palace"), a building designed by Jacques Carlu and built at Porte Dauphine between 1955 and 1957 to serve as the NATO headquarters. It served that function between 1959 and 1966, when France left the NATO military structure.

Paris-IX Dauphine was designated as an "experimental university", and was one of the very few universities in France to select students on the basis of their Baccalauréat scores. The legality of this was disputed, and some rejected students threatened lawsuits and were subsequently quietly admitted, a strategy that became increasingly popular by 2002. In response, in 2004, Dauphine ceased being a public university and became a grand établissement under the name Université Paris Dauphine, which legally allows it to practice selective admissions.

In 2009, Université Paris Dauphine gained EQUIS (EFMD Quality Improvement System) accreditation, awarded by the European Foundation for Management Development. It is a founding member of the Executive DBA Council.

In 2011, Université Paris Dauphine was one of the 16 co-founders of Paris Sciences et Lettres University (PSL). On 5 November 2019, PSL became formally established as a public university, organized in the form of a collegiate university (modelled after British collegiate universities such as Oxford and Cambridge) allowing its constituent institutions to keep their legal personality. On the same date, Dauphine officially became a college of PSL. It now self-styles its name as Université Paris Dauphine - PSL.

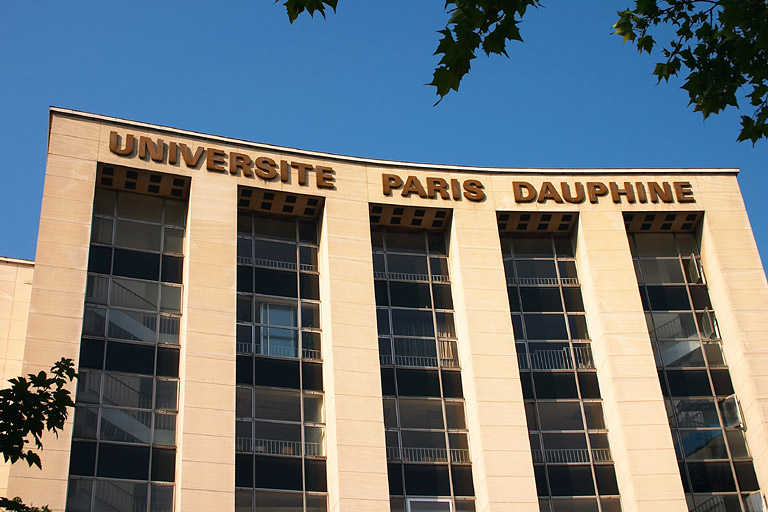
The Porte Dauphine campus of Dauphine University

== International degree offers ==
Paris Dauphine University - PSL has a campus in Tunis offering bachelors and masters programs, and a campus in London offering courses in cooperation with University College London.

It offers joint degree programs with the Autonomous University of Madrid (in economics, management, and social sciences), and with Goethe University in Frankfurt (in economic sciences).

== Rankings ==
- 2025: As a part of Université PSL, Dauphine is ranked the 24th-best university in the world according to the Times Higher Education World University Rankings
- 2025: As a part of Université PSL, Dauphine is ranked 24th-best university in the world according to the QS World University Rankings
- 2024: As a part of Université PSL, Dauphine is ranked 19th-best university in the world according to the Center for World University Rankings
- 2023: As a part of Université PSL, Dauphine is ranked as the 3rd-best young university in the world according to Times Higher Education World University Rankings
- 2020: As a part of Université PSL, Dauphine is ranked 36th-best university in the world according to the Shanghai ranking

== Alumni ==
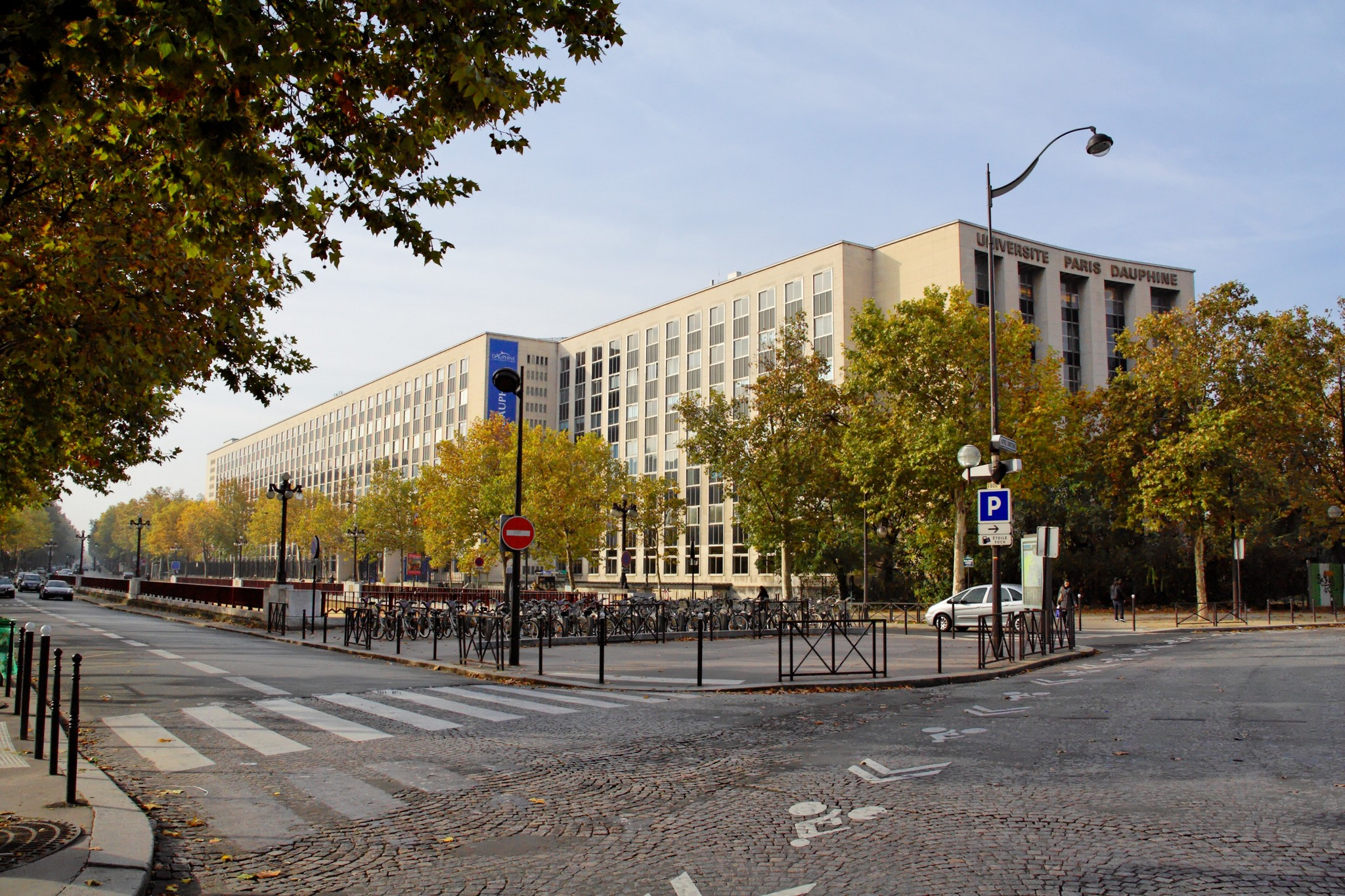
Main campus of Paris-Dauphine University in Paris

=== Heads of state ===
- Faure Gnassingbé: President of Togo
- Raymond Ndong Sima: Prime Minister of Gabon
- Boni Yayi: President of the Republic of Benin

=== Business leaders ===
- Thierry Bolloré: CEO of Jaguar Land Rover, former CEO of the Renault group
- Yannick Bolloré: CEO of Havas, chairman of the supervisory board of Vivendi, Vice Chairman of Bolloré group
- Bruno Bonnell: Chairman & founder of Infogrames, former CEO of Atari
- Michel Combes: CEO of SoftBank Group International ("SBGI"), former CEO of Alcatel-Lucent & former CEO of TDF
- Olivier François: President and CEO of Fiat
- Arnaud Lagardère: Chairman of groupe Lagardère and of the Board of Directors of EADS
- Emmanuel Roman: CEO of PIMCO
- Régis Schultz: CEO of JD Sports
- Jean-Michel Severino: CEO of the French Development Agency
- Florent Menegaux: CEO of Michelin

=== Economists and mathematicians ===
- Thierry Aimar: French economist, specialist of the Austrian School of economics and history of economic thought
- Jacques Attali: the first head of the EBRD
- Olivier Blanchard: chief economist of the International Monetary Fund
- Agnès Bénassy-Quéré: deputy governor of Banque de France & chief economist at the Direction générale du Trésor
- Nicolas Bouzou: French economist
- Guillaume Carlier: French mathematician
- Hélène Frankowska: Polish and French mathematician
- Marion Laboure: economist, macro strategist
- Bertrand Lemennicier: French economist
- Mathilde Lemoine: group chief economist of Edmond de Rothschild
- Jean Tirole: economist; recipient of the Nobel Memorial Prize in Economic Sciences in 2014; author of The Theory of Corporate Finance, Princeton University Press 2006
- Cédric Villani: mathematician, awarded the Fields Medal in 2010

=== Politicians and administrators ===
- Audrey Azoulay: civil servant, politician, UNESCO Director-General
- Nicolas Dupont-Aignan: French politician, deputy and president of Arise the Republic
- Bintou Keita: UN Undersecretary General
- Hervé Mariton: French politician, Deputy and former Minister
- Hervé Novelli: French politician, Deputy and former Minister

=== Others ===
- Louis Boisgibault : Ministerial advisor & University College Director in Kosovo
- Alain Ehrenberg: sociologist
- Marc Levy: author
- Bernard Ramanantsoa: chairman of HEC Paris
- Nassim Nicholas Taleb: author of Fooled by Randomness and The Black Swan
- Philippe Verdier: radio and television journalist

=== Honorary degrees ===
- John Campbell: professor of economics at Harvard University
- Ronald Fagin: computer scientist at IBM Almaden Research Center
- Eleanor M. Fox: professor at New York University
- Jim Gray: computer scientist and Turing award winner
- Oliver Hart: professor of economics at Harvard University
- Paul Joskow: professor at Massachusetts Institute of Technology
- Ehud Kalai: professor at Northwestern University known for the Kalai-Smorodinsky model
- Henry Mintzberg: professor of management at McGill University
- David Newbery: Emeritus Professor of Economics at the Faculty of Economics, University of Cambridge
- Edmund Phelps: professor at Columbia University and author of golden rule savings rate
- Myron Scholes: economist and author of Black-Scholes model and Nobel Prize
- Robert J. Shiller: professor of finance at Yale School of Management and Nobel Prize
- Tom Snijders: professor at Nuffield College, Oxford and at the University of Groningen
- Herbert Spohn: professor at the Technical University of Munich
- Melchior Wathelet: Belgian politician
- Adriana Lleras-Muney: professor of economics at University of California, Los Angeles
