= Maret =

Maret may refer to:

- Maret (name)
- Les Marêts, a commune in the Seine-et-Marne département in the Île-de-France region in north-central France
- Maret School, a private, secular, co-educational, college-preparatory school located in northwest Washington, D.C., USA
- March, in Indonesian month calendar

== See also ==
- Marest
- Mareth, city, ship, surname, fortification
- Marot
- Merit (disambiguation)
