= Marian Sutton Marshall =

English Typist and trade unionist

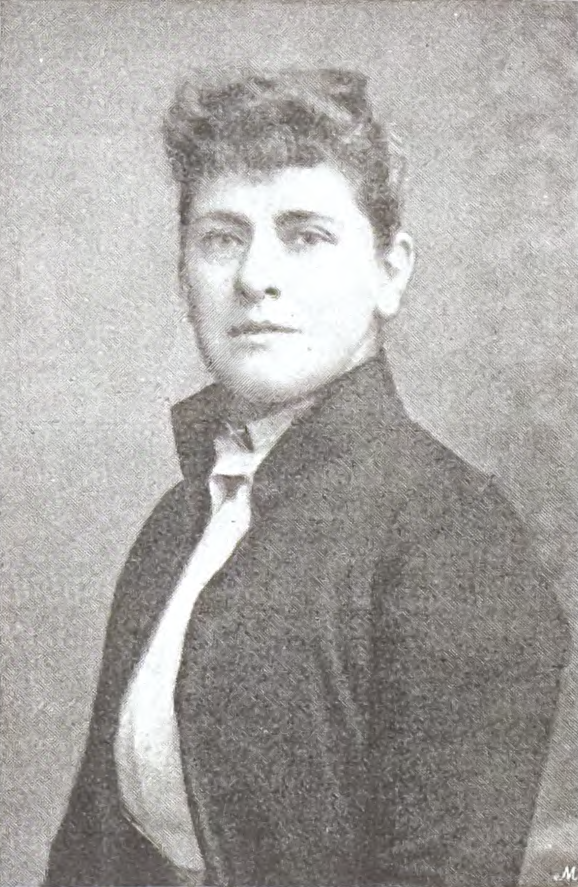
Marian Marshall in 1892.

Marian Sutton Marshall (née Broadbent; 12 September 1846 – 7 April 1901) was an English typist and trade unionist.

== Biography ==
Mary Anne Broadbent, later known as Marianne or Marian, was born on 12 September 1846 at Lockwood, Huddersfield, to William Broadbent, a tea dealer, and Anne Thornton. When her education was complete she went with her mother and sister to New Zealand. She married, on 1 June 1870 at Camberwell, a Deputy Assistant Commissary General to the War office, Thomas Sutton Marshall. After some time, the marriage fell through and the two separated.

Now having to independently support herself she entered the world of work as a typist for novelist Charles Reade, with her first work being typing up his novel Christie Johnstone. She gained a reputation for speed and accuracy, and in 1884 established the 'Ladies Type-Writing Office', possibly the first such institution. Among the clients for this business was Oscar Wilde, who trusted her so much that he wanted her office to undertake typist work on De Profundis. He would later mention in a letter to Robbie Ross that "Mrs Marshall can be relied on." In 1889 she founded the Society of Typists (Later the National Union of Typists) to represent the interest of type-writers, and is thought to have been a good organiser and orator in this regard. In 1891 she was made the Society of Arts first examiner in type-writing, a position she held for the rest of her life.

She was prolific in her contributions to the press in her areas of expertise, contributing articles on shorthand and typewriting as an employment opportunity for women to publications such as The Queen's Journal, The Phonetic Journal, The Pall Mall Gazette, St James's Gazette, Tit-Bits, among others. She also published a short pamphlet on the subject in 1892 entitled Type-Writing Cards for Use in Offices and Schools.

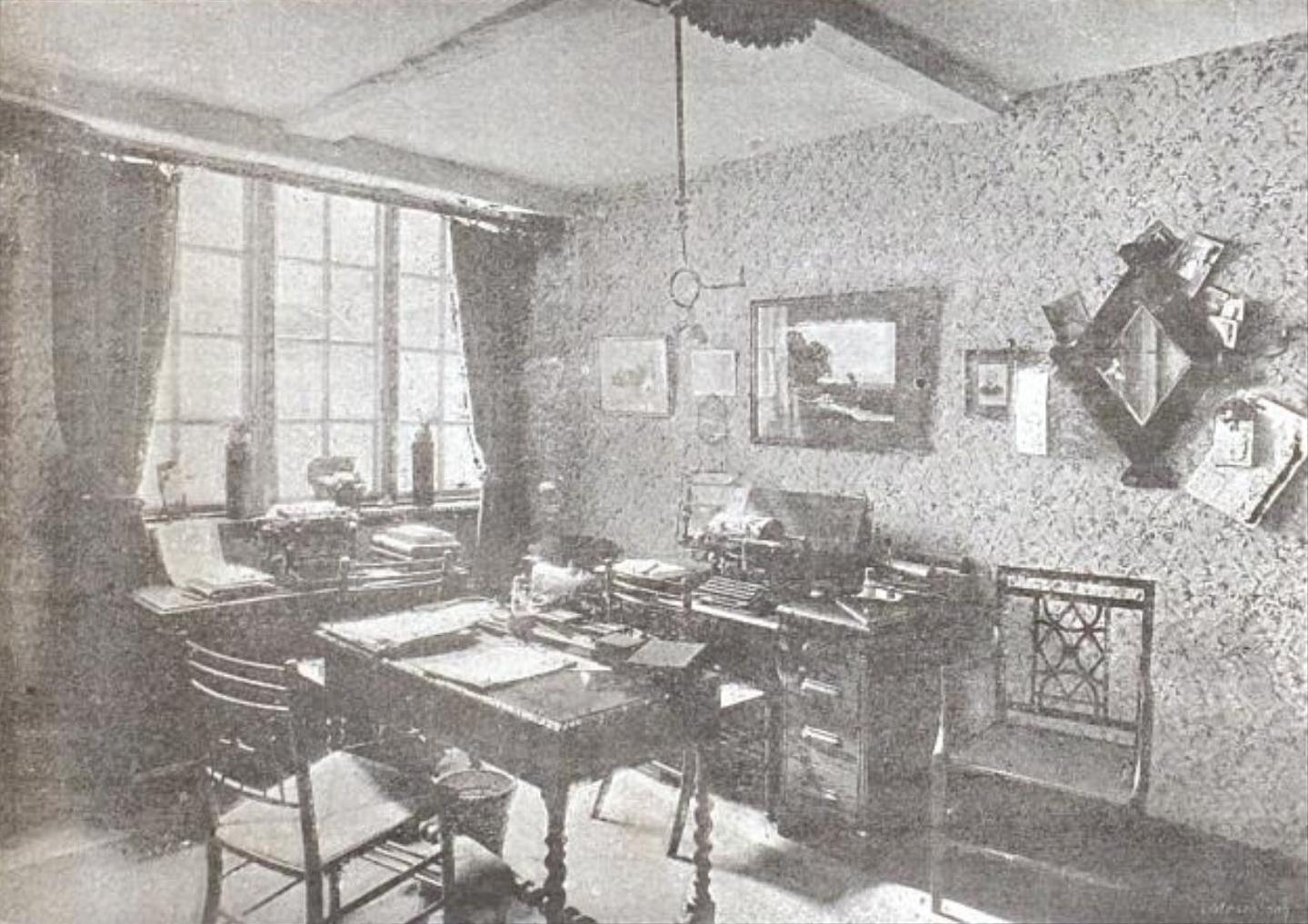
Marshall's Cambridge office as it was in 1892, shortly after it opened.

In 1892 Marshall moved out of London due to ill-health and settled in Cambridge where she soon established the Cambridge University Type-Writing Office which was patronised by University faculty. It was also in Cambridge that she and her 'lieutenant' Miss Riddell started a shorthand class to teach students at the university improved note taking. She was a consistent member of the Women's Suffrage Society and attended the 1899 International Congress of Women Workers in London representing the Liberal women of Cambridge, where she gave a speech on general education of women and business training in shorthand and typewriting.

Marshall died on 7 April 1901, aged 53, of cancer in London, having moved back after she sold her business in Cambridge due to her worsening health the previous year. She was buried in Hammersmith old cemetery.
