= Stephanie Oursler =

American visual artist and political activist (1938–2018)

Stephanie Oursler (born 1938) is an American painter, multimedia artist, and activist. She became active in feminist art and political activism after relocating to Rome, Italy, in the 1960s. Oursler is known for her work addressing gender, memory, and social justice, and for co‑founding the women‑artists’ collective Cooperativa Beato Angelico in Rome.

== Early life and activism ==
Oursler was born in 1938 in the United States. She studied at Sarah Lawrence College and became involved in political activism in the 1960s. She was associated with the Peace and Freedom Party and the Black Panther Party, and engaged in feminist organizing in the U.S., including participation in women’s centers and civil rights initiatives.

== Career in Italy ==
In the late 1960s, Oursler moved to Rome, where she became part of the Italian feminist and artistic movements. She co‑founded Cooperativa Beato Angelico, the first self‑managed women‑artists exhibition space in Italy, alongside Carla Accardi, Ester Coen, and Carla Petracci. The collective focused on promoting women artists and hosting exhibitions outside the male-dominated gallery system.

== Artistic works and publications ==
Oursler works in painting, photography, and artist books. She is best known for the artist book 5 CUTS (1975; reissued 2021), which combines silent‑film stills with autobiographical texts to explore memory, identity, and gender-based violence. Another notable work is Un album di violenza, a visual and textual exploration of social and political themes.

Her work often addresses feminist themes, violence against women, and personal and collective memory.

== Exhibitions ==
Oursler exhibited extensively in Italy in the 1970s. Key solo exhibitions include:

- Happy New Year (1975)
- Il segreto del Padiglione d’oro (1979)

She also participated in group exhibitions curated by Romana Loda, emphasizing women-only exhibitions and feminist perspectives.

== Legacy and recognition ==
Oursler’s work has been recognized internationally. Several of her artist books have been re-published or included in museum collections and contemporary art catalogues. Her pieces occasionally appear in art auctions, reflecting ongoing interest in her contribution to feminist and activist art.
