= Marni =

The name Marni originates from several languages, including Hebrew, meaning "rejoice", and Latin as a variant of "Marina", meaning "of the sea". It also has derivations from Gaelic and Swahili. "Marni" and "Marnie" are the two most common spellings of the female first name, ranking 2,446 and 1,498, respectively, out of 4,275 for females of all ages in the 1990 U.S. Census.

== Variants ==
Due to its many derivations, a number of alternate spellings and related variant names exist, including:

- Marni
- Marnee
- Marnie
- Marny, a Scandinavian variant of Marina
- Marney
- Marne
- Marna
- Marnette
- Marnina

== People with the given name ==
- Marnie Baizley (born 1975), Canadian squash player
- Marnie Bassett (1889–1980), Australian historian and biographer
- Darcey Bussell (born Marnie Crittle in 1969), English ballerina
- Marnie Gillett (1953-2004), American arts administrator
- Marnie Hughes-Warrington (born 1970), Australian professor and author
- Marni Jackson, Canadian non-fiction author
- Marnie McBean (born 1968), Canadian rower and triple Olympic champion
- Marnie McGuire (born 1969), former New Zealand professional golfer
- Marni Nixon (1930–2016), Hollywood voice specialist
- Marnie Peters, Canadian wheelchair basketball player
- Marnie Reece-Wilmore (born 1974), Australian actress
- Marnie Schulenburg (1984-2022), American actress
- Marnie Simpson (born 1992), English reality TV star from Geordie Shore
- Marnie Stern (born 1976), American songwriter and guitarist
- Marni Thompson, Canadian actress
- Marnie Weber (born 1959), American artist
- Marnie Woodrow (born 1969), Canadian writer and journalist

== People with the surname ==
- Helen Marnie (born 1978), Scottish musician with the band Ladytron
- Kara Marni (born 1998), English singer and songwriter

== See also ==
- Marni (brand)
- Marney, a surname
