= Marna =

Marna may refer to:

== Places ==
- Marna, Estonia, a village in Viljandi County
- Marna, Goa, a village in India
- Marna, Minnesota, an unincorporated community in Faribault County, Minnesota, U.S.
- Marna (river), or Mandalselva, in Agder county, Norway

== Other ==
- MV Marna, later MV Ricardo Manuela, a British coaster

== See also ==
- Marnas, or Dagon, a god worshipped in Gaza in antiquity
