= Marnay =

Marnay may refer to:

== Places ==
=== France ===
- Canton of Marnay, administrative division of the Haute-Saône department
- Marnay, Haute-Saône, in the Haute-Saône department
- Marnay, Saône-et-Loire, in the Saône-et-Loire department
- Marnay, Vienne, in the Vienne department
- Marnay-sur-Marne, in the Haute-Marne department
- Marnay-sur-Seine, in the Aube department

=== Philippines ===
- Marnay, a barangay in Sinait, Ilocos Sur

== People ==
- Audrey Marnay (born 1980), French actress and model
- Eddy Marnay (1920–2003), French songwriter

== See also ==
- Marney, a surname
