= Marnie Oursler =

Marnie Oursler (born in 1979) is an American home builder and television personality. She is the owner and operator of the homebuilding business Marnie Custom Homes, which is featured on the DIY Network show, Big Beach Builds.

== Biography ==
=== Early life and education ===
Marnie Oursler was born outside of Washington, D.C., in Prince George's County, Maryland into a family of homebuilders. The tradition began with her great-great-grandfather and has been passed down through five successive generations. Her father, Marvin Oursler, owns Marrick Homes in Prince Frederick, Maryland. She attended Northern High School and graduated in 1996. During high school, Oursler spent her free time working at construction sites in the area with her uncles and her brother, Chris. She attended the Naval Academy for one year before transferring to East Carolina University, where she was on the softball team. She proceeded to get her Master's in Business Administration from Duke University's Fuqua School of Business.

=== Career ===
Oursler bought her first house at the age of 24 in Bethany Beach, Delaware for $240,000 - costing her all of her savings. Unable to afford workers, she renovated the house using skills she obtained from working with her family. Nine months later, she sold the house for $340,000, using the profits to build another beach house. After living in that house for two years, Oursler sold it and built a third house.

Realizing her talent and passion for the homebuilding business, Oursler began tracking real estate patterns in 2007. She approached a couple who had previously asked her about homebuilding at the beach. When the couple agreed to let Oursler be their homebuilder, she quit her job as a real estate agent to start Marnie Custom Homes.

=== Television ===
Oursler is the host of DIY Network's show Big Beach Builds. The first season aired in March 2016 and the second season aired in the spring of 2018. On the show, Oursler makes fantasy beach homes on the coast of Delaware a reality by transforming dated houses into custom properties.

She was also the host of the HGTV Dream Home 2018 alongside fellow television personality Brian Patrick Flynn.

== Awards and recognition ==
- 2012: Spokesperson for 84 Lumber's "We Build American" Initiative
- 2013: 40 Under 40, Professional Builder magazine
- 2013: Strong, Smart, Bold Award, Girls, Inc. of Delaware
- 2013: Gold Stevie Award, Entrepreneur of the Year, Stevie Awards for Women in Business
- Construction Advisory Board of Delaware Technical Community College
- Best of Houzz 2015, Design
- Member, Board of Advisors for the Center of Entrepreneurship and Innovation at The Fuqua School of Business at Duke University
