= Marnie Andrews =

American actress

- Occupations: Television, stage actress
- Years active: 40+
- Awards: Berrilla Kerr Playwrighting Award
- Website: marnieandrews.com

Marnie Andrews is an American stage and television actress ER, JAG, Murder One, Reasonable Doubts, (with Mark Harmon and Marlee Matlin) (1991-1993), The Wonder Years and made for TV movies "Line of Fire: The Morris Dees Story," (1991), Shattered Mind (1996), among others. Much of her stage work comes from the development of new plays. She has originated numerous roles in world premieres, several as a member of New Jersey Repertory Company. Andrews is also a director

As writer and poet (with articles published in such magazines as Natural History, CR, Amica and American Theatre), she writes often of her travels with Jeff Jacobson. Her writing focusses on the issues of environmental protection, working within the community to effect change, and the advantages of long, sustaining friendships. She is also a teacher..

== Theater ==
=== As actor ===
- Emily, "The Realization of Emily Linder," by Richard Strand World Premiere, New Jersey Repertory Company.
- http://www.broadwayworld.com/new-jersey/article/BWW-Interviews-Marnie-Andrews-in-THE-REALIZATION-OF-EMILY-LINDER-at-NJ-Rep-2015040858#
- Amanda, "The Glass Menagerie" by Tennessee Williams Oklahoma State University Theatre Department, 2011, Guest Artist
- Evelyn, 'Til Summer Comes by Mark McNease, New Jersey Repertory Company, 2002
- Rosemary, Touch of Rapture by Mary Fengar Gail, New Jersey Repertory Company, 2005
- Madeline Livingston, The Women of Lockerbie by Deborah Brevoort, New Jersey Repertory Company, 2006
- multiple roles, "Play by Play," Stageworks Hudson, Hudson, NY.

Much of her career she worked with playwrights as an actor, director, and dramaturge developing new plays. Member of Plays in Progress, Hudson Opera House, Hudson, NY, and New Jersey Repertory Company.

== Filmography ==
- Jack Goes Home Independent Film 2015
- Love Is Hell Independent Film, 2008
- ER
  - "Union Station" (1996) TV Episode
- Shattered Mind (1996) TV Movie
- JAG
  - "Hemlock" (1996) TV Episode
- Murder One
  - "Chapter Sixteen" (1996) TV Episode
- The Wonder Years
  - "Unpacking" (1993) TV Episode
- Reasonable Doubts 1991-1993 Multiple Episodes
  - "Two Women" (1993) TV Episode
  - "Mercury in Retrograde" (1992) TV Episode
  - "Moment of Doubt" (1992) TV Episode
  - "Maggie Finds Her Soul" (1992) TV Episode
  - "Dicky's Got the Blues" (1991) TV Episode
- Writer's Block (1991) TV Movie
- L.A. Law
  - "Watts a Matter?" (1990) TV Episode
- Roe v. Wade (movie)|Roe v. Wade (1989) TV Movie

== Director ==
The Mousetrap, Guest Director, Eastern Illinois University. Fifth of July, by Lanford Wilson SUNY/Albany, 2011 Merit Award in Ensemble Work and Technical Achievement, American College Theatre Festival, Family: Can't Live with Them, Can't Live Without Them, one-acts, including works by James Farrell, U/Albany, 2008, Trojan Women adaptation by Steven Wolfson, Getty Museum, Los Angeles, CA 1999.

== Writer ==
- Berrilla Kerr Playwrights Award. 2004.
  - Based on the writing "Survival Secrets."

Poem-"The Trees of Miller Road" published in "The Last Roll," Daylight Books, 2013

Various magazine articles, see www.marnieandrews.com
