= Mariotta =

Mariotta or Mariota may refer to:

- Mariota, Countess of Ross (died 1440), Scottish noblewoman
- Marcus Mariota (born 1993), American football quarterback
- Tuiasosopo Mariota, a tribal leader who helped keep American Samoa from being incorporated into the United States
- Giuseppe Mariotta, Mayor of Locarno from 1845 to 1848
- John Mariotta, founder of the Wedtech Corporation involved in the Wedtech scandal
- Mariota Tiumalu Tuiasosopo (1905–1957), author of the American Samoan national anthem
- Mariotta Haliburton (c. 1500–c. 1563), Scottish noblewoman

== See also ==
- Marietta (disambiguation)
- Mariot, a surname
- Marriott (disambiguation)
- Mariotto (disambiguation)
