= Società Elettrica Sopracenerina =

The Società Elettrica Sopracenerina, or Electricity Company of Sopraceneri, is a Swiss electricity supply company. It operates throughout the Sopraceneri region of the canton of Ticino, and is headquartered in the city of Locarno. It is part of the Alpiq Group.
