= Raffaello Ossola =

Swiss painter

- Born: 1954 (age 71–72)
- Education: modern surreal
- Website: http://www.ossolaraffaello.com

Raffaello Ossola is a painter, born in Locarno, Switzerland, who has lived in Italy since 1990.

Ossola uses acrylic and has a distinctive style that incorporates elements such as architecture, pools, clouds, rocks, shrubs, and obelisks in surreal landscapes. His style uses characteristic light reflections and projections. The colour gradients are flawless and delicate.

His works Sentimento and Equilibrio Temporale were exhibited in Galleria Gagliardi in San Gimignano, Italy.
