= Locarno =

- Municipality
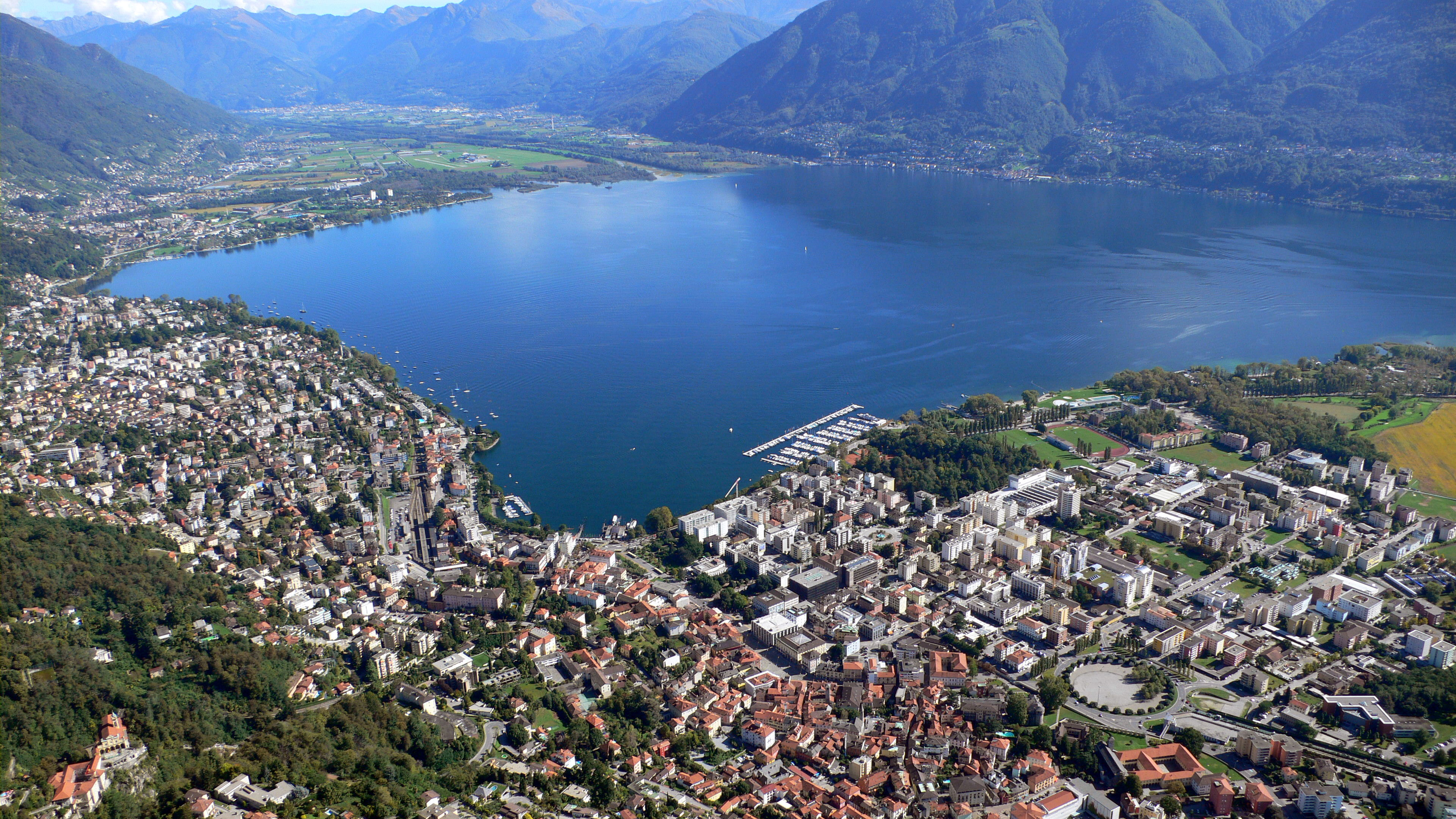

- Flag Coat of arms
- Location of Locarno
- Location within Switzerland Location within Canton of Ticino
- Coordinates: 46°10′N 8°48′E
- Country: Switzerland
- Canton: Ticino
- District: Locarno

Government
  - Executive: Municipio with 7 members
  - Mayor: Sindaco (list); Nicola Pini FDP.The Liberals (as of December 2024)
  - Parliament: Consiglio comunale with 40 members

Area
  - Total: 24.61 km^{2} (9.50 sq mi)
- Elevation: 200 m (660 ft)

Population (2025-12-31)
  - Total: 15,968
  - Density: 648.8/km^{2} (1,680/sq mi)
- Demonym: Italian: Locarnesi
- Time zone: UTC+01:00 (CET)
  - Summer (DST): UTC+02:00 (CEST)
- Postal code: 6600
- SFOS number: 5113
- ISO 3166 code: CH-TI
- Localities: Solduno, Monte della Trinità, Brè sopra Locarno, Ponte Brolla, Riazzino (Piano di Magadino), Gerra Piano (Piano di Magadino)
- Surrounded by: Ascona, Avegno, Cadenazzo, Cugnasco, Gerra (Verzasca), Gambarogno, Gordola, Lavertezzo, Losone, Minusio, Muralto, Orselina, Tegna, Tenero-Contra
- Twin towns: (Georgia (country)) Gagra, Georgia; Karlovy Vary, Czech Republic; Lompoc, United States; Montecatini Terme, Italy; Urbino, Italy
- Website: locarno.ch

Locarno (Italian: [loˈkarno]; German: [loˈkaʁno]; Ticinese: Locarno [loˈkɑːrno]; formerly in German: Luggarus [luˈɡaːrʊs]) is a southern Swiss town and municipality in the district Locarno (of which it is the capital), located on the northern shore of Lake Maggiore at its northeastern tip in the canton of Ticino at the southern foot of the Swiss Alps. It has a population of about 16,000 (proper), and about 56,000 for the agglomeration of the same name including Ascona besides other municipalities.

The town of Locarno is located on the northeastern part of the river Maggia's delta; across the river lies the town of Ascona on the southwestern part of the delta.

Locarno is the 74th largest city in Switzerland by population and the third largest in the Ticino canton, after Lugano and Bellinzona.

The official language of Locarno is Italian.

The town is known for hosting the Locarno International Film Festival, which takes place every year in August and involves open-air screenings at the main square, the Piazza Grande. It is also known for the Locarno Treaties, a series of European territorial agreements negotiated here in October 1925.

== History ==
=== Prehistoric Locarno ===
In 1934, in the vicinity of today's Via S. Jorio, a necropolis with 14 urn graves from the Early Bronze Age (about the 14th century BC) was found. Some of the urns were directly buried, while others were placed in boxes of uncut stone. The urns contained, in addition to burned bones, bronze ornaments, which had some fire damage, including bangles, hairpins with conical heads and slightly thickened necks, rings and knives. Similar urns were also discovered in the district of S. Antonio, which was probably also a small cemetery. The ceramic and bronze objects date from the Canegrate culture (named after a large necropolis in the province of Milan). However, no traces of the settlement have been discovered.

In 1935, a large necropolis was discovered at Solduno. The over 200 graves cover nearly a thousand years, from the La Tène culture to the 3rd century AD. Many of the La Tène era grave goods (particularly from the 3rd–1st centuries BC) are Celtic-style fibulae or brooches. These objects demonstrate a cultural influence from regions north of the Alps. However, the ceramic objects are indigenous to Golasecca culture which spread into Ticino and Lombardy.

=== Roman era ===
Between 1946 and 1949, a number of Roman era tombs were discovered on the terrace between the churches of Santa Maria in Selva and San Giovanni Battista in Solduno. The Roman city that became Locarno was therefore between the vicus of Muralto and this cemetery. Intensive construction and agricultural activity have destroyed most traces of the ancient city. In 1995 and 1997, 57 graves were found in Via Valle Maggia. Nineteen were from the Roman period, which confirms that even in the 3rd century AD cremation and body burials were practised side by side. Among other significant finds, several glass items were discovered. The Roman necropolis was used from the end of the prehistoric La Tène era until the middle of the 3rd century AD. The extensive Romanization of Locarno wiped out much of the local culture and replaced it with ancient Roman elements. However, it appears that there was no Roman ruling class which could have dominated the local population.

=== Capitanei di Locarno ===
The capitanei were a group of prominent noble families who emerged in the early Middle Ages and led Locarno. The term is first mentioned in a document granting market rights to the town by the Emperor Frederick I in 1164. This title was originally reserved only for the direct vassals of the king's fief. The lower vassals were known as valvassores, but could have been awarded the title of capitanei as a special concession. The original capitanei were probably descendants of the old Lombard noble family of Da Besozzo from the county of Seprio, a historic region of Lombard Italy which comprised areas in southern Ticino and modern-day Italian provinces of Varese and Como on the western side of Lake Maggiore, and was centred in Castelseprio, some 20 kilometres south of Locarno.

Around 1000, the family was granted a fief in Locarno by the schismatic Bishop of Como Landolfo da Carcano. The capitanei were given the right to manage the property of the Church entrusted to the local pieve; they had the rights of immunity and coercion, but were not owners of the village cooperatives' (vicini) land, with the exception of the churches and royal estates. They did not have the right of high justice, so their political power was limited. However, they played an important role in the later conflicts in the 13th and 14th centuries between the Guelphs and Ghibellines and in the wars between Como and the Duchy of Milan.

In Locarno, during the Reformation period in the 16th century, two of the three great feudal families of capitanei, the Muralto and the Orelli families, left the town and moved to Zürich. A branch of the Muraltos was established in Bern. The third great Locarno family, the Magoria, remained in Locarno. The capitanei retained a central role in Locarno's politics until 1798. In 1803, the lands and rights of the capitanei were integrated into the political municipality of Locarno.

=== Early Locarno ===
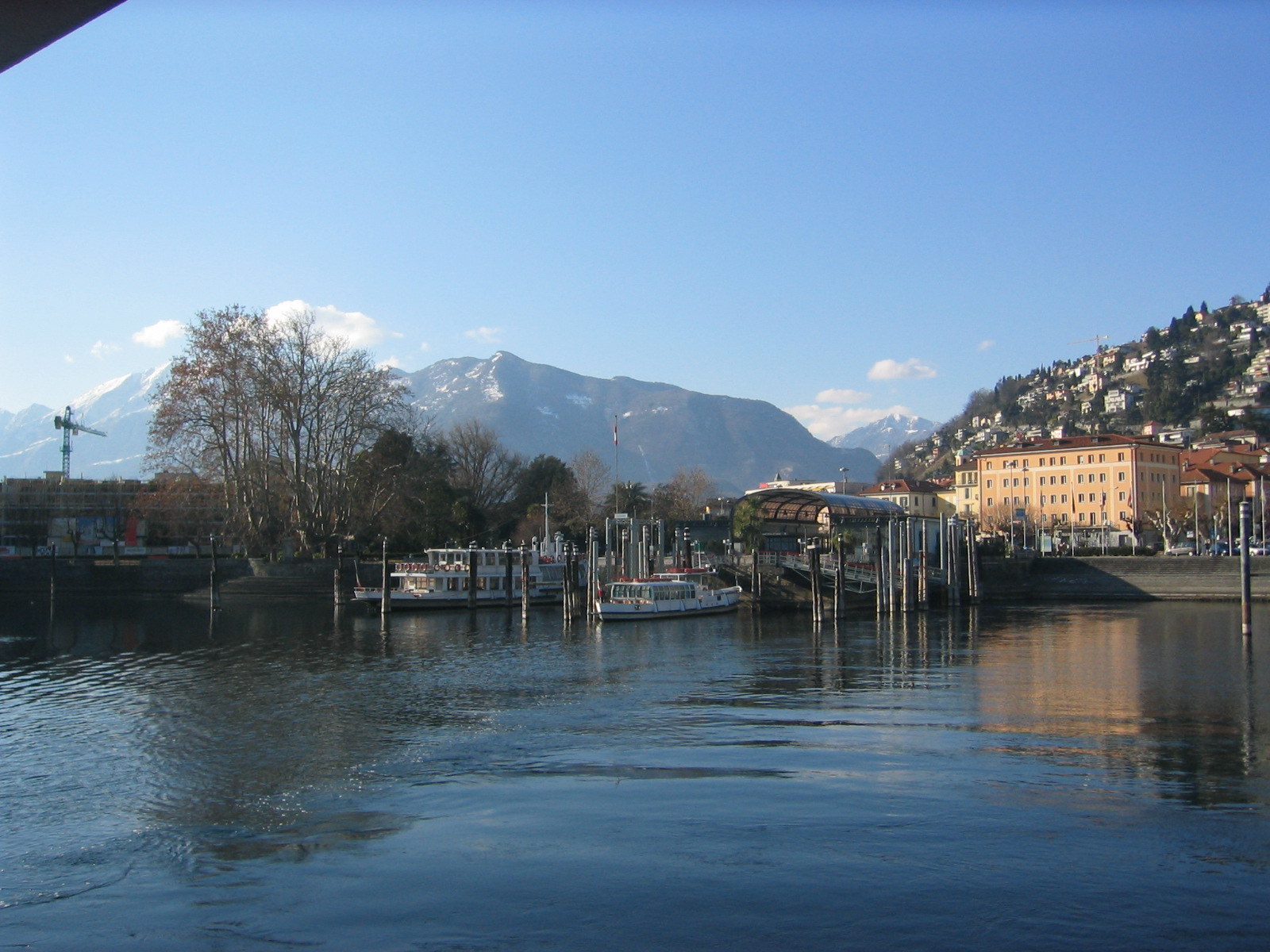
Harbour of Locarno. Trade along the lake allowed Locarno to flourish

Starting in the Lombard period (after 569), the area around Locarno (and presumably the town) was part of the county Stazzona and later the Mark of Lombardy. Locarno is first mentioned in 807 as Leocarni. In German, it came to be known as Luggarus, Lucarius, Lucaris. It is likely that a market existed at or near the lake since the Roman era. The long history of the town and its location led to the creation of a royal court, which was first mentioned in 866. During the Middle Ages, Locarno and Ascona formed a community, with several separate neighbourhoods. The community managed its common goods (alpine pastures, pastures, forests, churches) and had tax officials and police.

In the 10th century, the Bishop of Milan began to consolidate more and more power for himself at the expense of the Kings of the Germans. This expansion by Milan was countered by Henry II, who incorporated Locarno in 1002/04 with the surrounding areas into the Diocese of Como. Friedrich Barbarossa granted extensive market rights to Locarno in 1164 and granted imperial immediacy in 1186. Due to these privileges, Locarno developed substantial local autonomy, which assisted in the development of municipal institutions. The nobles (Nobili) lost more and more rights to the citizens (borghesi). By 1224, the borghesi had their own administration and various privileges, including: market rights, the right to their own weights, maintenance of mills and grazing rights in Saleggi, in Colmanicchio (Alp Vignasca) and in the Magadino and Quartino valleys.

Locarno was the administrative centre of the parish of Locarno. The Podestà, or high government official, resided in the Casa della Gallinazza, which was burned in 1260 during the clashes between the Guelphs and Ghibellines. Several Locarno families, including members of the Capitanei di Locarno and Simone da Orello, played an important role in the battles between the two factions. In 1342, Luchino and Giovanni Visconti conquered the area, which brought Locarno back under the power of Milan. In 1439, Count Franchino Rusca was awarded Locarno as a fief.

In 1291, a Humiliati monastery was first mentioned in Locarno. St. Catherine's church, attached to the monastery, probably dates to the mid-14th century.

=== Under the Swiss Confederation ===
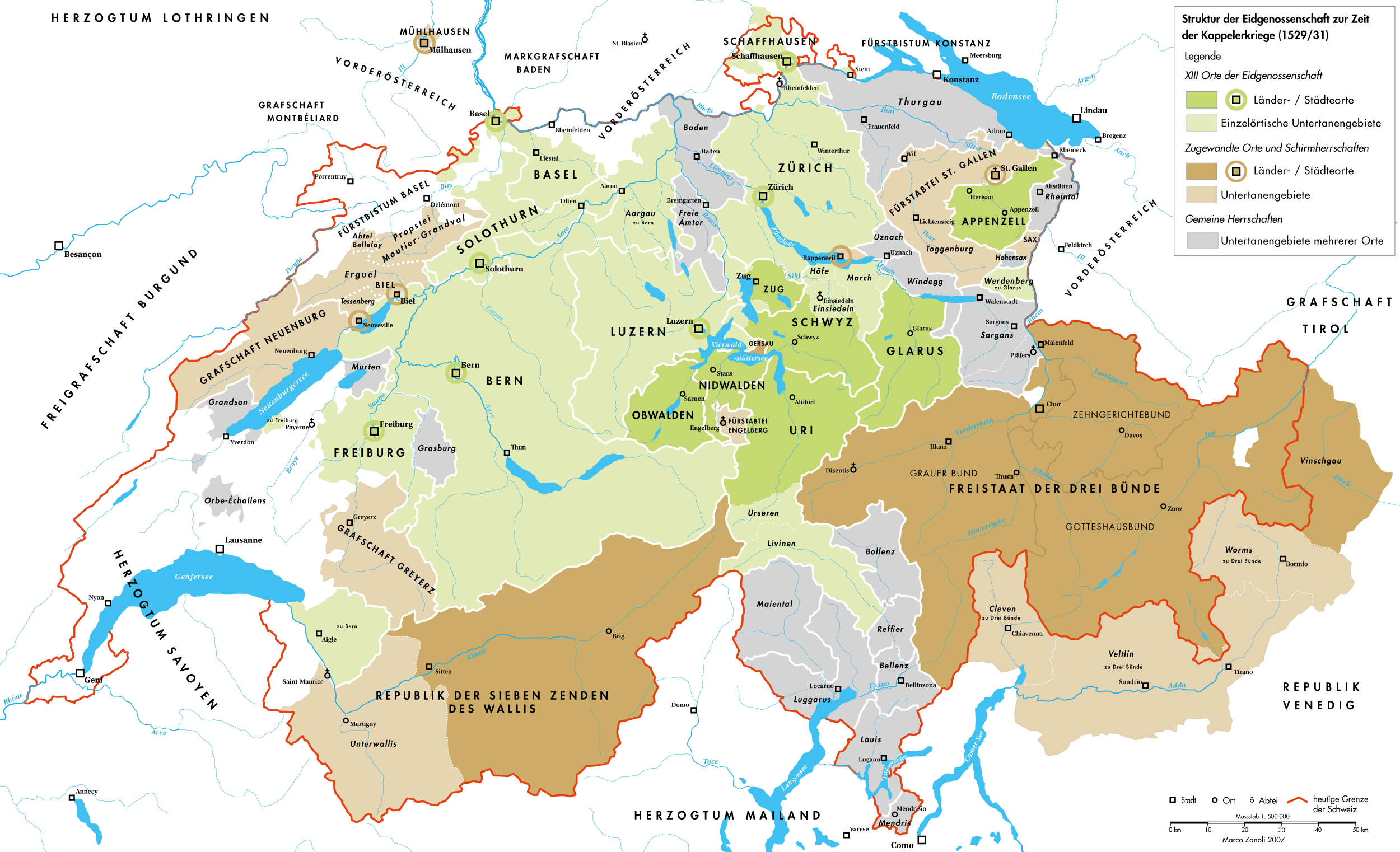
Swiss Confederation in 1530, showing Locarno and other territories of the Ticino region

The rule of the Rusca ended in 1503, when the Confederates occupied Locarno, but failed to conquer the Visconti castle. After the battle of Novara in 1513, the French King Louis XII gave the Confederates the castle. In the Treaty of Freiburg in 1516, they received all of Locarno. The Twelve Cantons took turns appointing a governor (Italian: commissario), to rule over Locarno. The governor had both civil and criminal jurisdiction, except in certain cases after 1578, where seven judges were elected by the locals to try the cases. On taking office, the governor swore under oath to obey the statutes of Locarno. The governor was supported by a local mayor, and criminal fines were usually given to the local community.

The rule of the Twelve Cantons also affected the social and political relations of the town. In addition to the nobility (representing the three old noble families Orelli, Muralto and Magoria) and citizens, there was a third group. This third group, the terrieri, was a group of residents who had lived a long time in Locarno, but were not citizens. Each of the three groups was a statutory corporation, with shared property and a governing body. Under the Confederation, each of these groups or corporations had representation in the Consiglio Magnifico which ruled Locarno. However, the town's dominance over the villages in the region, until 1798, is clearly shown in their representation in the council. The three groups in Locarno had twelve aldermen (six nobles, four citizens and two terrieri), while all the rural communities together had only eight members.

During the Middle Ages, Locarno was centred around the intersection of Via Cittadella and Via S. Antonio. The town stretched up the slope of the mountain and behind the castle. Some houses lined the shore, and above the Contrada Borghese a small, almost rural settlement grew up. The centre of town was dominated by townhouses with their large courtyards and gardens. The members of the upper class also owned small country houses with vineyards, which went up the hill behind Locarno as well as in Solduno and Cugnasco. Locarno also had several noble estates during the Late Middle Ages, including the so-called Cittadella. The buildings of the 17th and 18th centuries, including the Casa Simona (16th to 18th century), the Casa Rusca from the first half of the 18th century (now the seat of the municipal art gallery) and the Casa del Negromante, were built on older structures and didn't change the layout of the town.

=== Locarno's castles ===
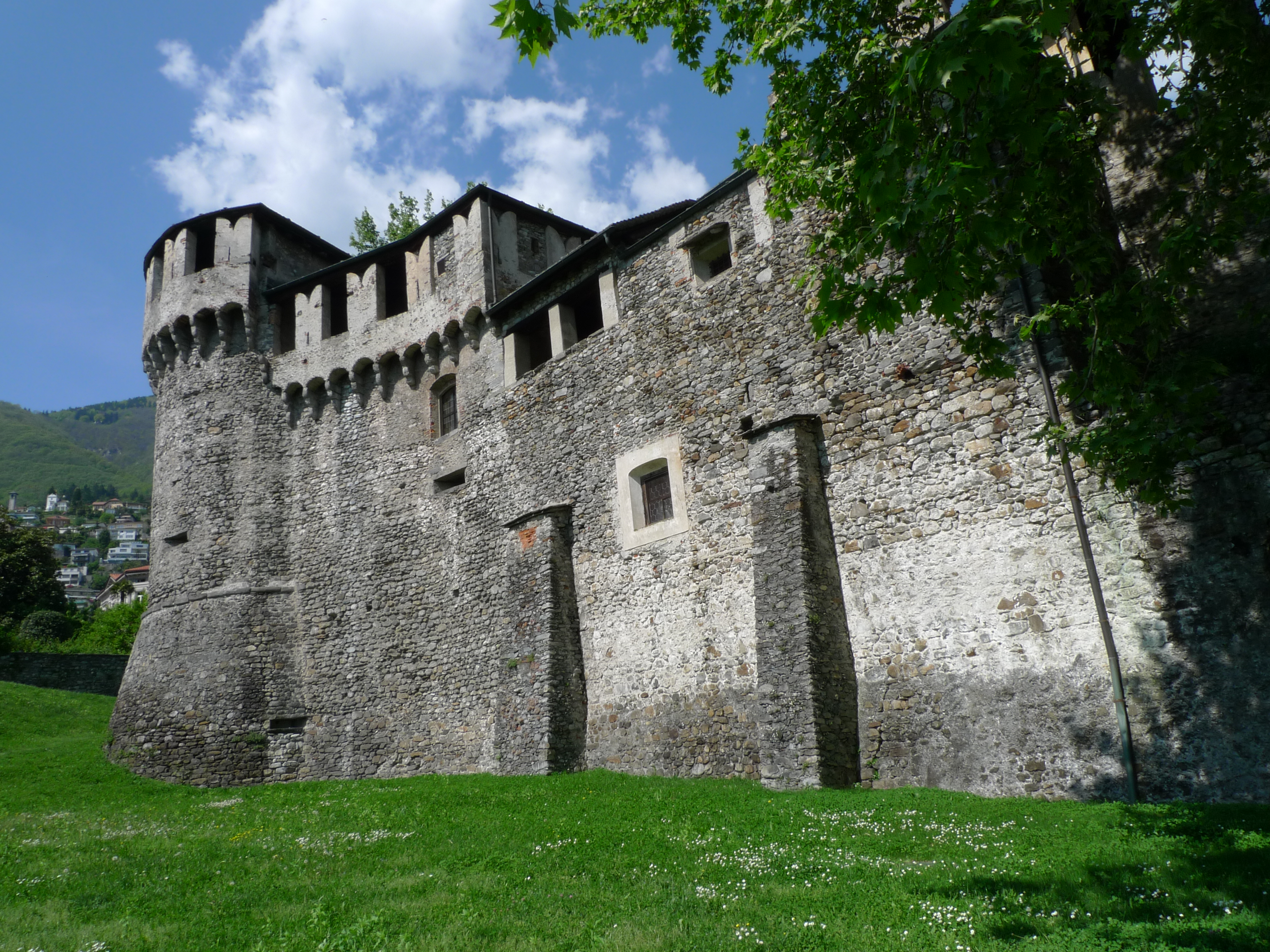
Castello Visconteo

There were several castles from the Early Middle Ages in Locarno. One was destroyed by the Milanese in 1156. Another, first mentioned in 1210 as Orelli Castle, was occupied in 1342 by the Visconti and enlarged. This castle came to be known as Visconti Castle. In 1531, the Confederates demolished much of the castle, leaving only the central core. The castle was used as the residence of the governor, but in the following centuries, it began to fall apart. From 1804 to 1909, the castle was the seat of the administrative governor and the District Court. After 1909, it came into the possession of the city and was renovated in 1921–1928. Since 1920, it has housed the city and the Archaeological Museum. In 1507, a defensive bastion or ravelin was added to protect the castle entrance. It is likely that Leonardo da Vinci designed this structure. North-east of the castle is Palazzo Casorella (Casa degli Orelli) from the 16th century.

=== Early modern Locarno ===
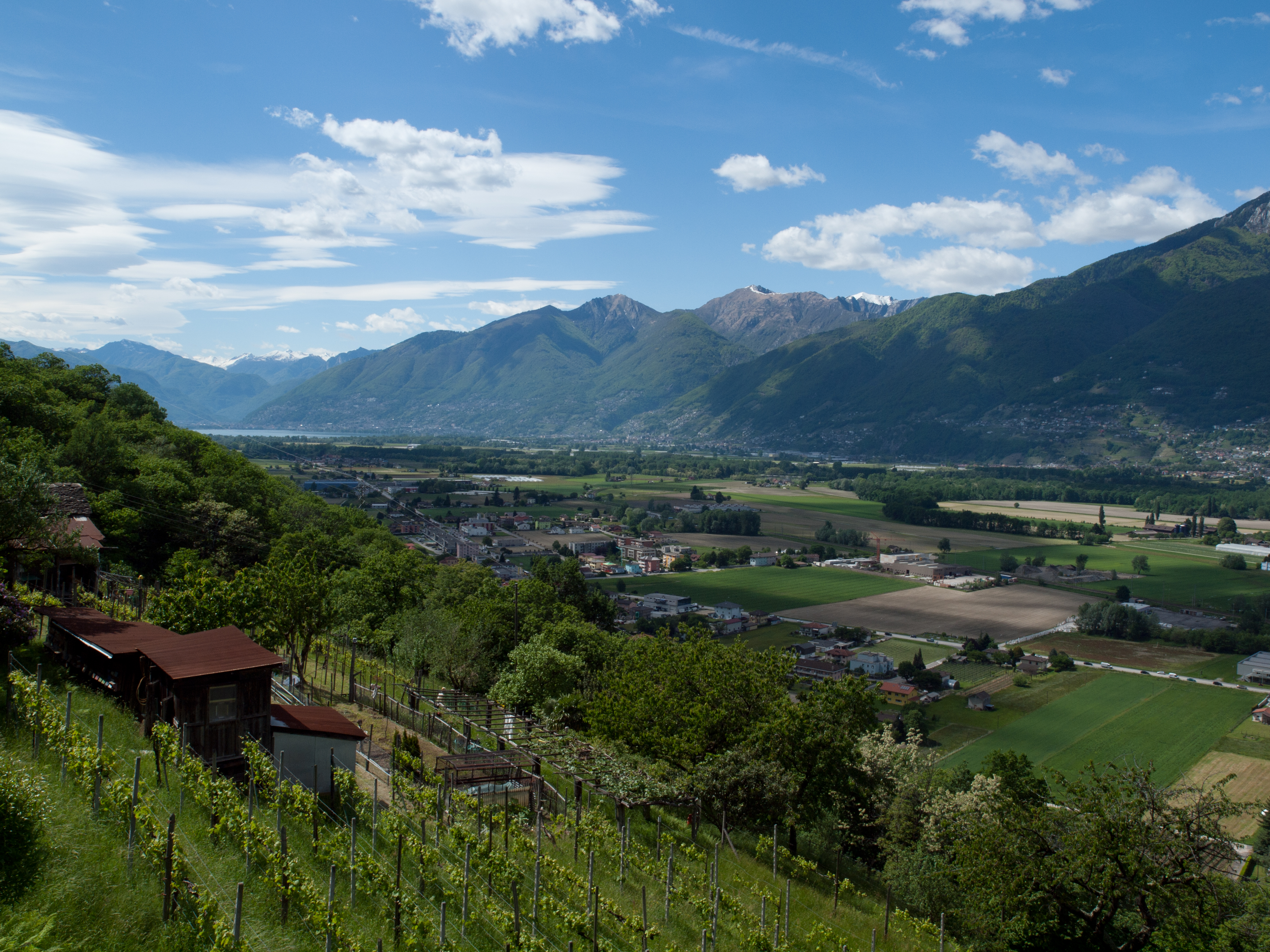
Vineyards above Locarno

During the Middle Ages, the economy of Locarno and the whole region was closely linked with the nobles who owned the market, fishing, alpine and grazing rights and tithes. Starting in the 13th century, some of these privileges went to the citizens' corporation. The hill areas were dominated by viticulture, while grain was raised in the plains. Within the town, vegetables and fruits were grown. Artisans and stores were concentrated in the interior of the town. The repeatedly flooded shorelines and the alpine pastures were used for grazing. In the early modern period, Locarno developed into a thriving commercial centre on an important road that linked the major cities of Lombardy with German-speaking Switzerland and Germany. Cereals and salt came from Lombardy and Piedmont to Locarno, while Locarno and its hinterland (especially the Maggia Valley) provided large quantities of wood and cattle to Italy.

The parish church of Locarno, S. Antonio Abate, was first built in 1353–1354. It was replaced by the current building in 1664. The decoration of the church was financed, primarily, by the grain traders at the end of the 17th century, and the chapel frescoes are by Giuseppe Antonio Felice Orelli from 1742. The citizens of Locarno had the right to appoint priests at S. Antonio Abate, S. Maria in Selva (consecrated in 1424, since 1884 only the choir and bell tower remain) and SS Trinità dei Monti (consecrated in 1621). The church of San Francesco, together with the adjoining convent, were built in the early 13th century. The church's first consecration was probably in 1230, but the first documented consecration of the church was in 1316. It was rebuilt and enlarged between 1538 and 1675 using construction material from Visconti Castle. San Francesco hosted the meetings of the nobility and the citizens. Starting in the 16th century, the appointed governor swore his oath in the church.

In the 16th century, the Humiliati order was suppressed, and St. Catherine's church and monastery closed. All three ruling groups of Locarno agreed to convert the church and monastery into the Hospital S. Carlo. The Hospital remained until 1854 when it closed, due to financial reasons.

In the 16th century, Locarno's population declined as a result of the exodus of Protestants and the plague in 1576–77. After a recovery in the 17th century, the population declined considerably again in the 18th century.

=== Protestant Reformation ===
By 1535, there was a Protestant community known as the ecclesia christiana locarnensis in Locarno. They owed their existence to the work of Giovanni Beccaria, several notables of the town (including Taddeo Duni) and religious refugees from Milan and Piedmont. To counteract the tensions, the Protestant community and the Catholic clergy met for a debate on 8 May 1549. At the end of the debate, Beccaria was imprisoned. However, because of protests against his arrest, he was immediately released. In 1550, Locarno declared itself to be a Catholic town, but a large group continued to practice the Protestant faith. However, in 1554, the Diet of Baden issued an ultimatum to the Protestants: either renounce their new faith or go into exile. On 3 March 1555, over 100 people left Locarno to emigrate to Zürich.

In the course of the Counter-Reformation in the 17th century, many religious buildings in Locarno were renewed or rebuilt. These include the 1604 church dedicated to SS Sebastiano e Rocco with the Capuchin monastery and the church of S. Maria Assunta (Chiesa Nuova).

=== The Canton of Ticino ===
Under the Helvetic Republic (1798–1803), Locarno was part of the Canton of Lugano. Following the collapse of the Helvetic Republic, the Act of Mediation, in 1803, created the Canton of Ticino with Locarno as an independent municipality. The Helvetic Republic was very liberal and attempted to reform much of Swiss society. However, the changes were too great, and the Republic collapsed. The Compromise Act of Mediation changed some aspects of society but left others unchanged. The new municipality of Lucarno was no longer ruled by three different patriziati, which had emerged from the three groups (nobles, borghesi and terrieri), but until the mid-19th century there were institutions that reached back to the Ancien Régime. For example, the community of Locarno and Ascona was dissolved in 1805. Nevertheless, a "committee of the representatives of the former communities of Locarno" managed, for several decades, the S. Carlo Hospital and schools, which had been shared by the patriziati of the old, combined community. However, the power of the old patriziati gradually weakened. In 1859, the terrieri decided to set aside their corporation. The nobles' corporation distributed its assets in 1866–1867 to its members and dissolved the archive, but retained the fishing rights until about 1920. Only the citizens' corporation has preserved its status as a civil community.

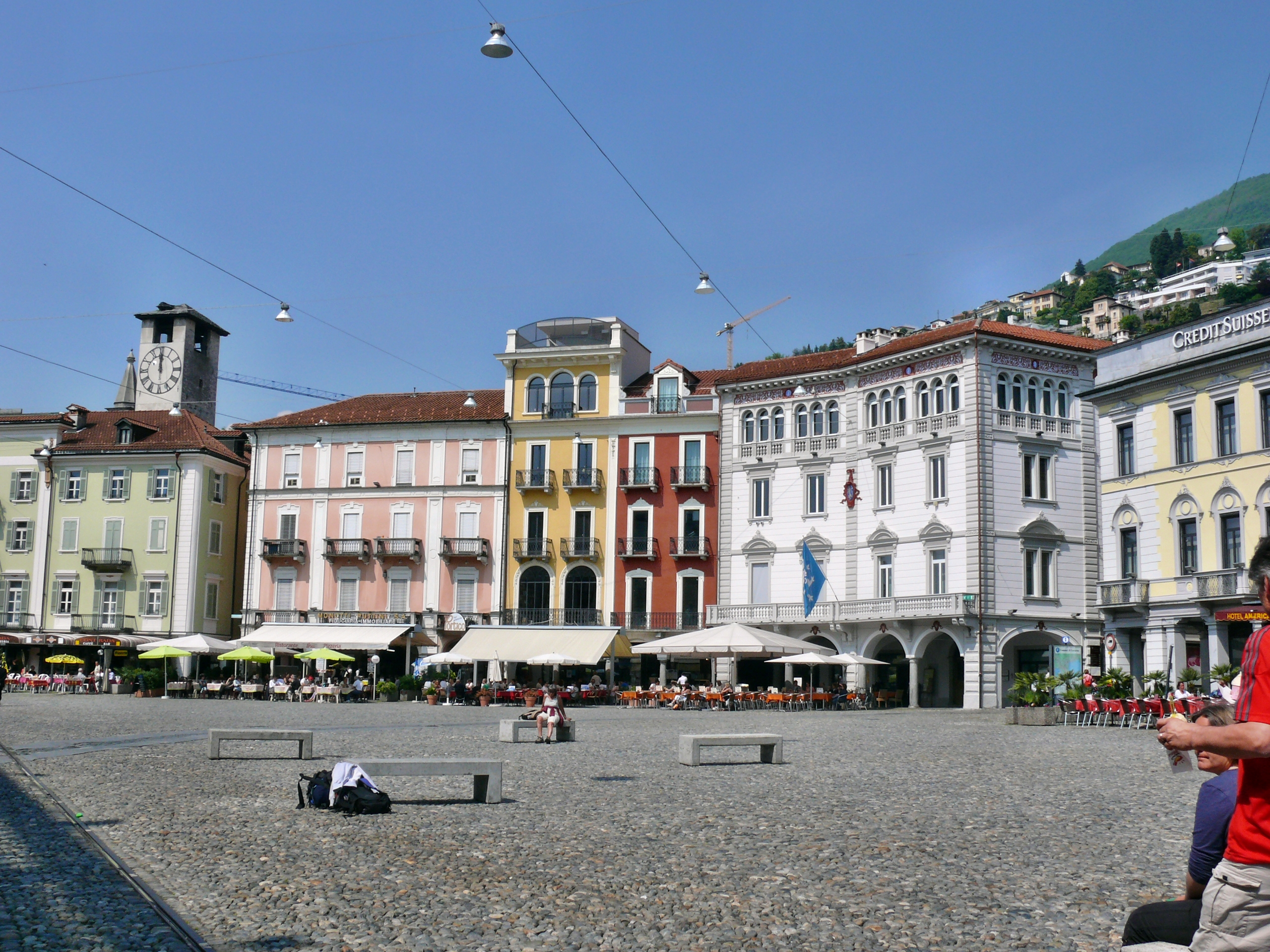
Piazza Grande

The Constitution of 1814 established Locarno, Bellinzona and Lugano as the capitals of the canton, in a six-year rotation. Locarno was the capital of the canton in 1821–1827, 1839–1845, 1857–1863 and 1875–1881. In 1838–1839, on the initiative of a group of notables, a government building was built. It was sold in 1893 to a private company. It then became the headquarters of Credito Ticinese, and since 1917 it has been the headquarters of the Electricity Company of Sopraceneri. Locarno was repeatedly the scene of political clashes. In 1839 and 1841, uprisings against the government broke out. In 1855, a murder in a coffee house was used as a pretext for a coup of radicals (pronunciamento). Another coup, the Ticino coup of 1890, did nothing to change the balance of power between the parties in the city. After a liberal mayor ruled for 35 consecutive years (1865–1880), a conservative mayor ruled for another 36 years (1880–1916).

To break the conservative hegemony of the late 19th century, the Social Democrats allied with the Liberals in the 1916 elections. They succeeded to a majority in the city government (which then consisted of nine members, but in 1987 was limited to seven), which they kept in the following decades.

In the 19th century, the population in Locarno grew noticeably compared to neighbouring communities. As early as 1836, the immigrant population was over 16% of the population. Between 1860 and 1880, the population fell slightly mainly because of emigration to California. In the following decades, the growth rates were below those of other population centres of the canton, which, unlike Locarno, benefited directly from the Gotthard railway.

In 1816, the special rights and title of the old mother church of San Vittore in Muralto went over to S. Antonio Abate. In 1863, snow collecting on the roof of the church caused the vault to collapse, killing 40 people. The citizens' collective, or borghesi, lacked the resources to repair the church. Therefore, in 1866, the ownership and maintenance of the churches of S. Antonio and S. Maria in Selva were given to the town as a whole. For financial reasons, the collapsed church was not completely repaired. Only the façade and central vault were rebuilt, and the choir was expanded.

Between 1863 and 1874, the church of San Francesco had to be used for services, and after 1798, the Assemblies of the neighbourhoods, the city and the county were held in the church. In 1814, the church of San Francesco was secularized and the Franciscans had to leave. The church and convent served from 1821 until 1827 as the State Government offices. From 1848 to 1863, the church was closed for worship, and in 1874 it was converted into a barracks and a salt storage. In 1924, it was converted back into a church and used by Benedictines for Catholic services delivered in the German language. The Jesuits took over this task from 1947 until 1992. The monastery was secularized in 1848, and after the 1893–1894 renovation, it housed the first high school. Then, in 1930, it was used for teacher training.

=== Modern Locarno ===
Between 1935 and '92, the newspaper L'Eco di Locarno was printed in Locarno. In 1992, it merged with the official newspaper of the Liberal party Il dovere to create the daily newspaper La Regione. Since 1987, the only German language newspaper in Ticino, the Tessiner Zeitung, is published three times each week in Locarno.

== Geography ==
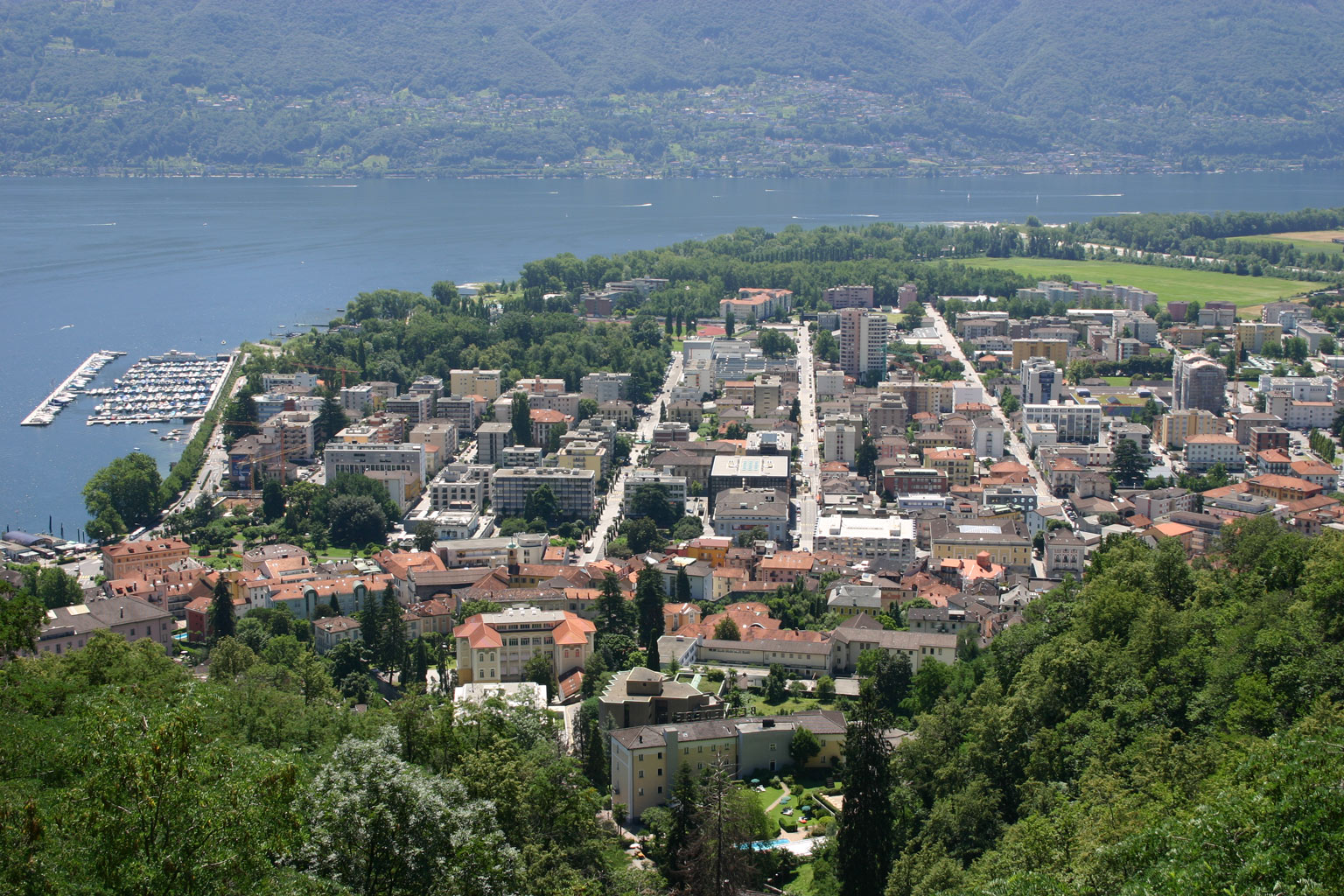
Locarno

Aerial view from 800 m by Walter Mittelholzer (1919)

Locarno has an area, as of 1997, of 19.27 square kilometers (7.44 sq mi). Of this area, 8.39 km^{2} (3.24 sq mi) or 43.5% is used for agricultural purposes, while 5.97 km^{2} (2.31 sq mi) or 31.0% is forested. Of the rest of the land, 4.92 km^{2} (1.90 sq mi) or 25.5% is settled (buildings or roads), 1.25 km^{2} (0.48 sq mi) or 6.5% is either rivers or lakes and 0.91 km^{2} (0.35 sq mi) or 4.7% is unproductive land.

Of the built-up area, industrial buildings made up 1.4% of the total area, while housing and buildings made up 10.3% and transportation infrastructure made up 7.6%. Power and water infrastructure, as well as other specially developed areas, made up 2.6% of the area, while parks, green belts and sports fields made up 3.6%. Out of the forested land, 28.3% of the total land area is heavily forested, and 2.7% is covered with orchards or small clusters of trees. Of the agricultural land, 31.2% is used for growing crops, while 2.1% is used for orchards or vine crops and 10.3% is used for alpine pastures. Of the water in the municipality, 0.8% is in lakes, and 5.7% is in rivers and streams. Of the unproductive areas, 4.6% is unproductive vegetation.

The municipality is the capital of its district. Locarno is located on the left shore of Lake Maggiore. The city is made up of the old town (historic settlement centre), the new town (Nuovo quartiere) toward the lake and the land district (quartiere Campagna) toward Solduno. The area of the municipality extends from the lake (elevation 209 m (686 ft)) to the mountains above the city (Monti della SS Trinità, Bre, Cardada and Cimetta, the highest point at 1,474 m (4,836 ft)). It includes a large part of the Magadino valley along with the right side of the Ticino River, and stretches from the Bolle di Magadino to Monda Contone.

=== Climate ===
Located on the southern Alpine foothills, it is amongst the warmest places in Switzerland, along with Lugano and Grono. It is also amongst its wettest places, receiving 1,897 mm (74.7 in) of precipitation per year (in comparison Stalden receives only 545 mm). The wettest months are August and October, during which time Locarno receives an average of 212 mm (8.3 in) and 210 mm (8.3 in) of precipitation, respectively. The driest month of the year is February, with an average of 59 mm (2.3 in) of precipitation over 4.5 days. Although a wet location in general, Locarno averages 99.3 precipitation days and as much as 2171 hours of sunshine per year, or 56% of possible sunshine. The high number of sunshine hours and precipitation is explained by the high intensity of rainfall that affects the region. In comparison, Sion has fewer sunshine hours with three times less precipitation. The Köppen-Geiger climate classification system classifies its climate as humid subtropical (Cfa).

Climate data for Locarno/Monti, elevation 367 m (1,204 ft), (1991–2020 normals, extremes since 1935)
Month	Jan	Feb	Mar	Apr	May	Jun	Jul	Aug	Sep	Oct	Nov	Dec	Year
Record high °C (°F)	24.0 (75.2)	24.5 (76.1)	27.9 (82.2)	31.8 (89.2)	31.2 (88.2)	35.1 (95.2)	37.3 (99.1)	37.9 (100.2)	30.9 (87.6)	30.5 (86.9)	23.3 (73.9)	22.2 (72.0)	37.9 (100.2)
Mean daily maximum °C (°F)	7.3 (45.1)	9.4 (48.9)	14.0 (57.2)	17.5 (63.5)	21.1 (70.0)	25.1 (77.2)	27.5 (81.5)	26.9 (80.4)	22.1 (71.8)	16.7 (62.1)	11.2 (52.2)	7.6 (45.7)	17.2 (63.0)
Daily mean °C (°F)	3.9 (39.0)	5.2 (41.4)	9.3 (48.7)	12.6 (54.7)	16.4 (61.5)	20.4 (68.7)	22.3 (72.1)	21.8 (71.2)	17.6 (63.7)	12.9 (55.2)	7.9 (46.2)	4.4 (39.9)	13.3 (55.9)
Mean daily minimum °C (°F)	1.2 (34.2)	2.0 (35.6)	5.4 (41.7)	8.5 (47.3)	12.2 (54.0)	15.9 (60.6)	17.8 (64.0)	17.4 (63.3)	14.0 (57.2)	9.9 (49.8)	5.4 (41.7)	2.0 (35.6)	9.3 (48.7)
Record low °C (°F)	−10.1 (13.8)	−9.0 (15.8)	−8.8 (16.2)	−1.0 (30.2)	0.9 (33.6)	5.7 (42.3)	9.3 (48.7)	9.2 (48.6)	4.2 (39.6)	−0.7 (30.7)	−3.5 (25.7)	−8.7 (16.3)	−10.1 (13.8)
Average precipitation mm (inches)	69.6 (2.74)	64.5 (2.54)	94.9 (3.74)	166.3 (6.55)	189.6 (7.46)	186.8 (7.35)	162.9 (6.41)	211.6 (8.33)	203.1 (8.00)	209.5 (8.25)	207.7 (8.18)	88.6 (3.49)	1,855.1 (73.04)
Average snowfall cm (inches)	10.1 (4.0)	8.5 (3.3)	2.4 (0.9)	0.1 (0.0)	0.0 (0.0)	0.0 (0.0)	0.0 (0.0)	0.0 (0.0)	0.0 (0.0)	0.0 (0.0)	1.8 (0.7)	11.6 (4.6)	34.5 (13.6)
Average precipitation days (≥ 1.0 mm)	5.3	4.6	6.4	9.5	11.4	10.4	9.0	10.0	9.0	9.3	9.7	6.3	100.9
Average snowy days (≥ 1.0 cm)	1.9	1.5	0.5	0.0	0.0	0.0	0.0	0.0	0.0	0.0	0.4	1.9	6.2
Average relative humidity (%)	65	60	55	59	64	64	62	66	70	75	72	67	65
Mean monthly sunshine hours	133.6	153.0	201.7	194.5	209.9	237.7	267.7	248.8	198.1	151.7	112.5	118.6	2,227.8
Percentage possible sunshine	60	61	60	53	51	59	65	63	58	51	49	56	57
Source 1: NOAA
Source 2: MeteoSwiss; Infoclimat

== Coat of arms ==
The blazon of the municipal coat of arms is Azure a lion rampant argent.

== Demographics ==
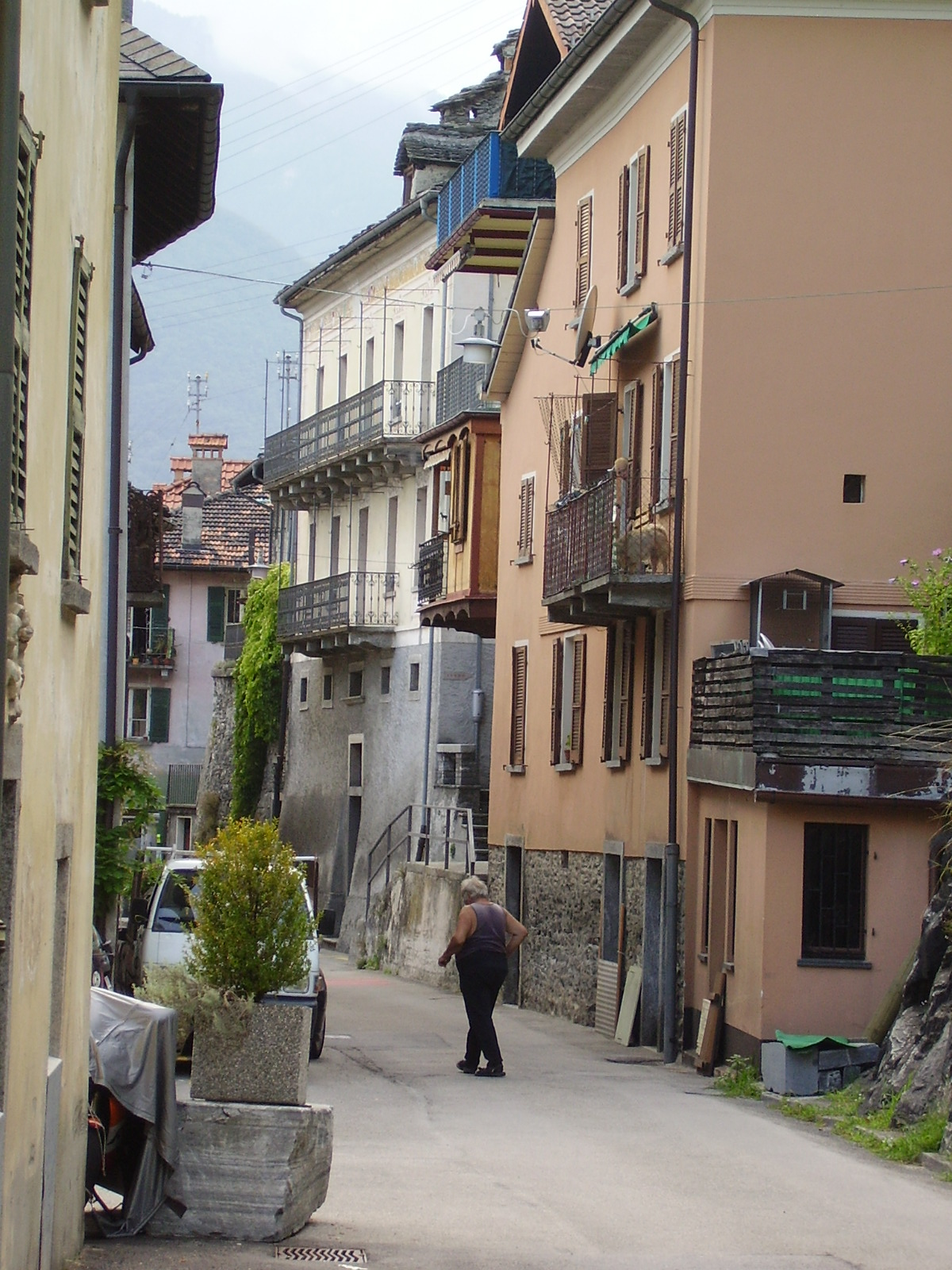
Old city of Locarno

Locarno has a population (as of December 2020) of 15,728. As of 2008, 33.9% of the population are resident foreign nationals. Over the last 10 years (1997–2007) the population has changed at a rate of 3.7%.

Most of the population (as of 2000) speak Italian (76.6%), with German being the second most common (10.5%) and Serbo-Croatian being third (3.1%). Of the Swiss national languages (as of 2000), 1,528 speak German, 189 people speak French, 11,153 people speak Italian, and 27 people speak Romansh. The remainder (1,664 people) speak another language.

As of 2008, the gender distribution of the population was 46.5% male and 53.5% female. The population was made up of 4,421 Swiss men (29.1% of the population) and 2,636 (17.4%) non-Swiss men. There were 5,654 Swiss women (37.2%), and 2,474 (16.3%) non-Swiss women.

In 2008 there were 83 live births to Swiss citizens and 45 births to non-Swiss citizens, and in the same period, there were 115 deaths of Swiss citizens and 33 deaths of non-Swiss citizens. Ignoring immigration and emigration, the population of Swiss citizens decreased by 32, while the foreign population increased by 12. There were 14 Swiss men and 3 Swiss women who immigrated back to Switzerland. At the same time, there were 87 non-Swiss men and 78 non-Swiss women who immigrated from another country to Switzerland. The total Swiss population change in 2008 (from all sources, including moves across municipal borders) was an increase of 159, and the non-Swiss population change was an increase of 55 people. This represents a population growth rate of 1.4%.

The age distribution, as of 2009, in Locarno is: 1,205 children or 7.9% of the population are between 0 and 9 years old, and 1,454 teenagers or 9.6% are between 10 and 19. Of the adult population, 1,791 people or 11.8% of the population, are between 20 and 29 years old. 2,002 people or 13.2% are between 30 and 39, 2,442 people or 16.1% are between 40 and 49, and 1,979 people or 13.0% are between 50 and 59. The senior population distribution is 1,767 people, or 11.6% of the population are between 60 and 69 years old, 1,541 people or 10.1% are between 70 and 79, and there are 1,004 people or 6.6% who are over 80.

As of 2000, there were 6,730 private households in the municipality, and an average of 2.1 persons per household. In 2000 there were 904 single family homes (or 42.1% of the total) out of a total of 2,147 inhabited buildings. There were 252 two-family buildings (11.7%) and 480 multi-family buildings (22.4%). There were also 511 buildings in the municipality that were multipurpose buildings (used for both housing and commercial or another purpose).

The vacancy rate for the municipality, in 2008, was 0.63%.In 2000 there were 8,647 apartments in the municipality. The most common apartment size was the 3-room apartment, of which there were 3,068. There were 856 single-room apartments and 877 apartments with five or more rooms. Of these apartments, a total of 6,709 apartments (77.6% of the total) were permanently occupied, while 1,695 apartments (19.6%) were seasonally occupied and 243 apartments (2.8%) were empty. As of 2007, the construction rate of new housing units was 10.5 new units per 1000 residents.

As of 2003 the average price to rent an average apartment in Locarno was 1046.19 Swiss francs (CHF) per month (US$840, £470, €670 approx. exchange rate from 2003). The average rate for a one-room apartment was 611.61 CHF (US$490, £280, €390), a two-room apartment was about 816.64 CHF (US$650, £370, €520), a three-room apartment was about 1007.47 CHF (US$810, £450, €640) and a six or more room apartment cost an average of 1896.51 CHF (US$1520, £850, €1210). The average apartment price in Locarno was 93.7% of the national average of 1116 CHF.

== Historic population ==
The historical population is given in the following table:

Year	Population	Italian speaking	German speaking	Catholic	Protestant	Other				Swiss	Non-Swiss
Year	Population	Italian speaking	German speaking	Catholic	Protestant	Total Other	Jewish	Islamic	No religion given	Swiss	Non-Swiss
1591	3,725										
1597	3,029										
1719	3,515										
1769	1,751										
1795	1,471										
1801	1,308										
1824	1,463										
1836	1,572										
1850	2,944	0	0	2,938	6	0	0	0	0	2,425	519
1870	2,885	0	0	2,903	1	0	0	0	0	2,318	603
1888	3,430	3,375	37	3,399	22	18	0	0	0	2,664	766
1900	3,981	3,825	107	3,893	59	49	1	0	0	2,513	1,468
1910	5,486	5,117	278	5,177	178	91	3	0	0	3,104	2,382
1930	6,575	5,570	883	5,846	566	122	8	0	0	4,464	2,111
1950	7,767	6,428	1,090	6,887	751	249	9	0	0	5,980	1,787
1970	14,143	11,408	2,000	12,491	1,387	735	32	8	139	9,603	4,540
1990	13,796	10,817	1,604	11,108	1,310	1,375	7	129	728	9,440	4,356
2000	14,561	11,153	1,528	10,179	1,072	1,880	15	200	1,167	9,430	5,131

== Heritage sites of national significance ==
There are nine Swiss heritage sites of national significance in Locarno. Three of the sites are churches: the church of S. Francesco and former convent, the church of S. Maria Assunta (new church) and the house of the canons and the church of S. Maria in Selva with Cemetery. The Castello Visconteo complex (part of which may have been designed by Leonardo da Vinci) is on the list. Two schools, the Ai Saleggi primary school and the Secondary School in via Dr. G. Varesi 30, as well as the Cantonal Library, are also listed. The last two are the Pinacoteca comunale Casa Rusca at piazza Sant’Antonio, and the Casorella at Via Bartolomeo Rusca 5, which make up the rest of the list. The entire city of Locarno is listed on the Inventory of Swiss Heritage Sites.

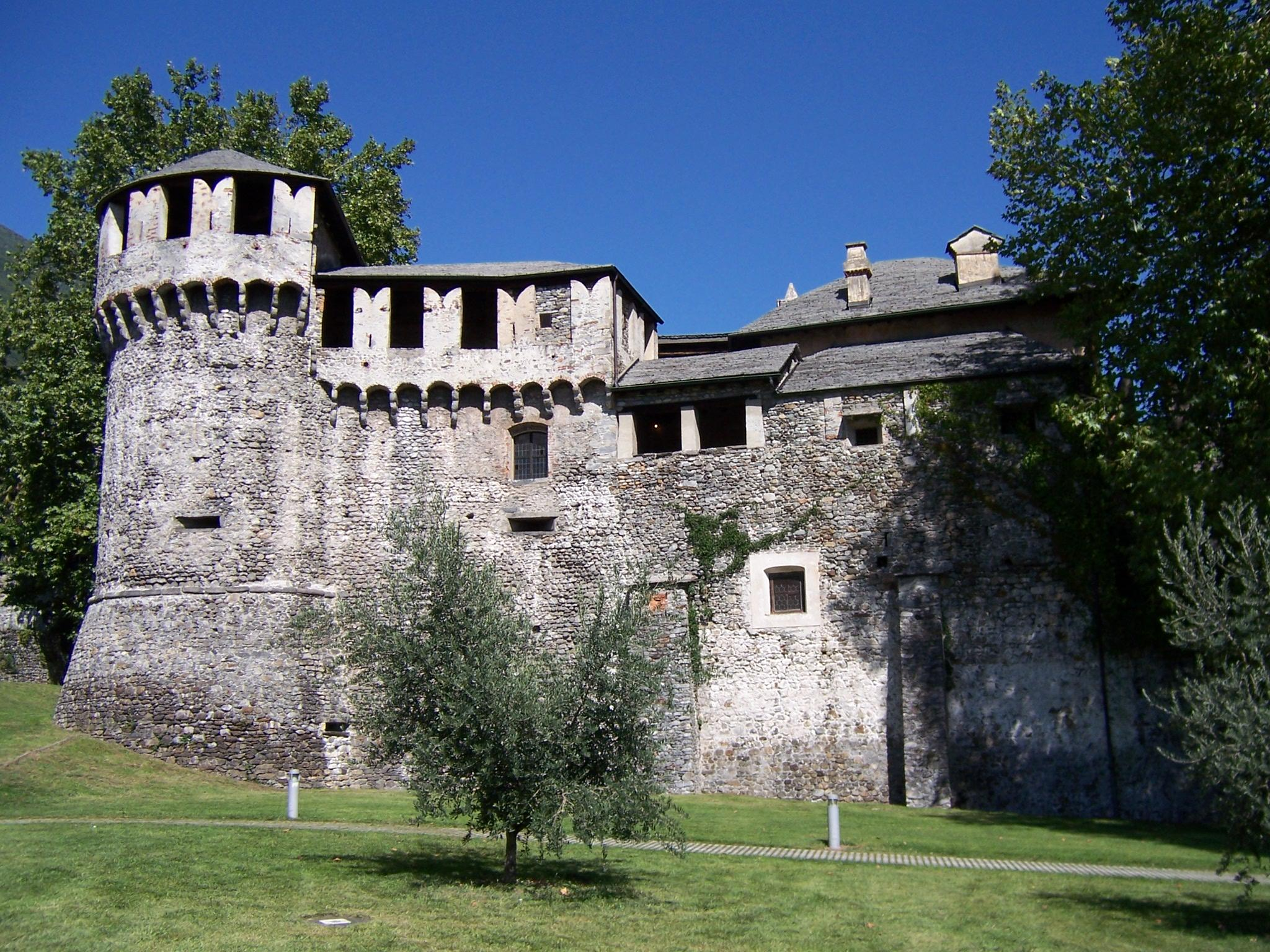
Castello Visconteo

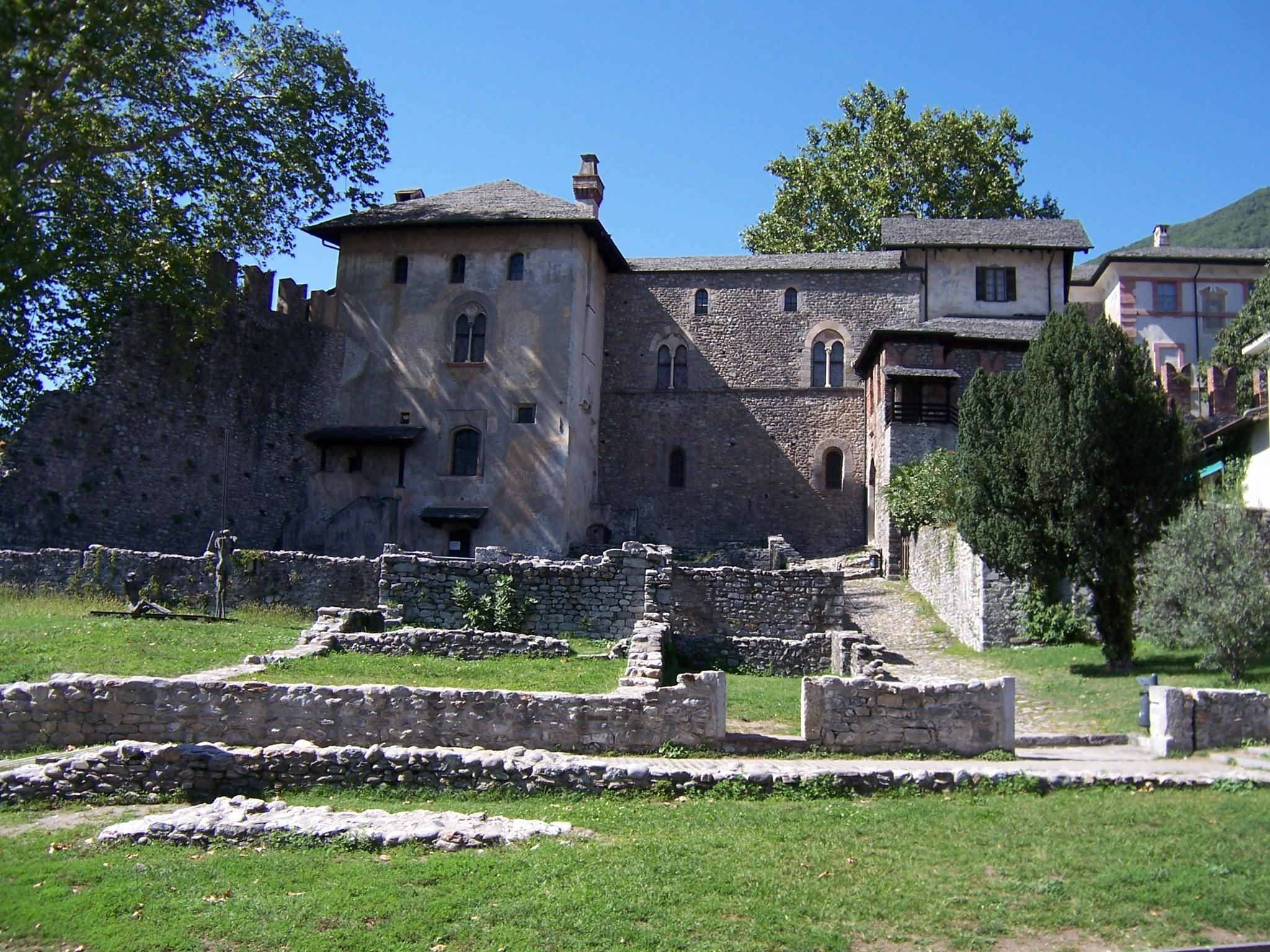
Castello Visconteo

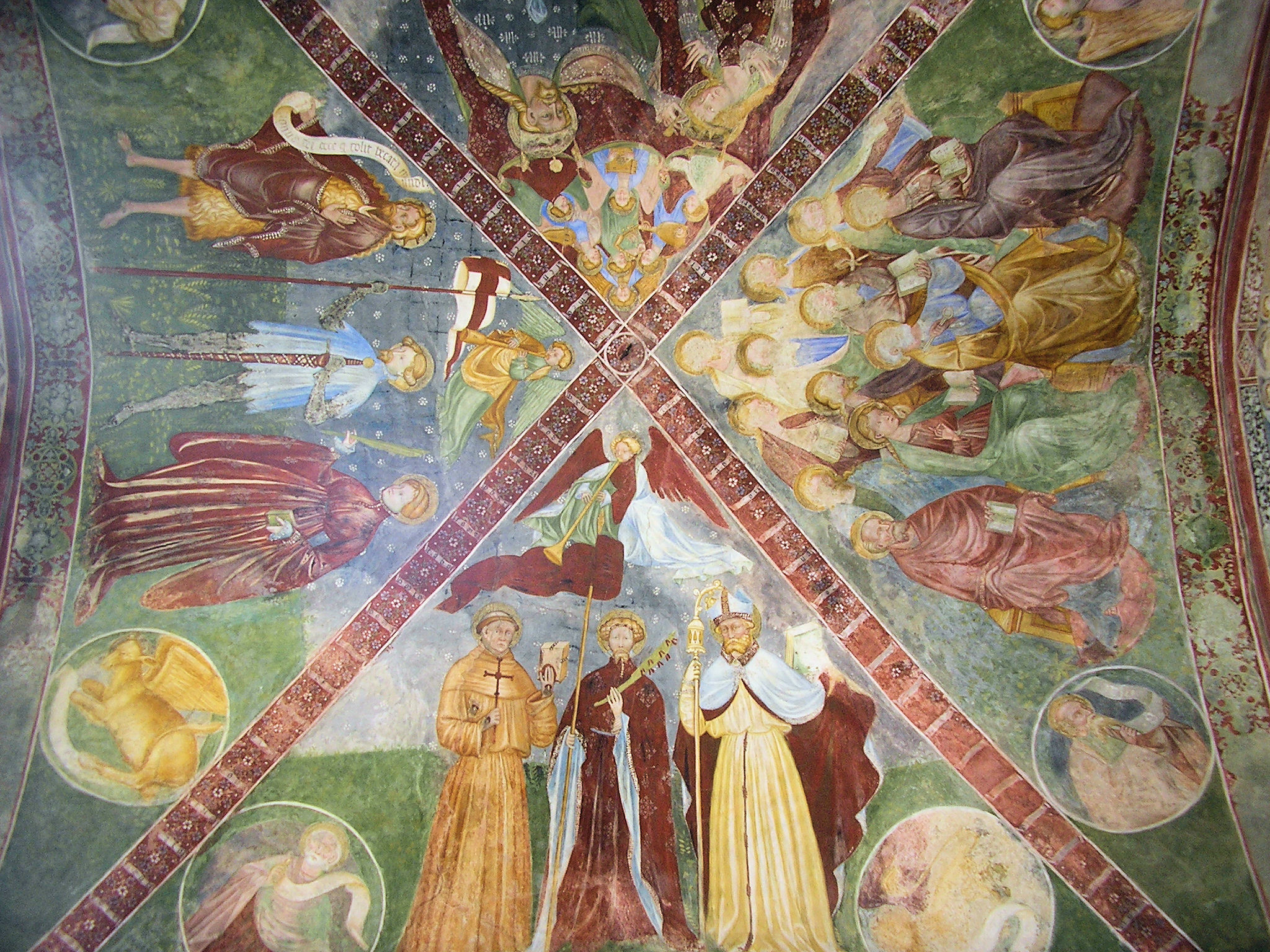
Santa Maria in Selva mural

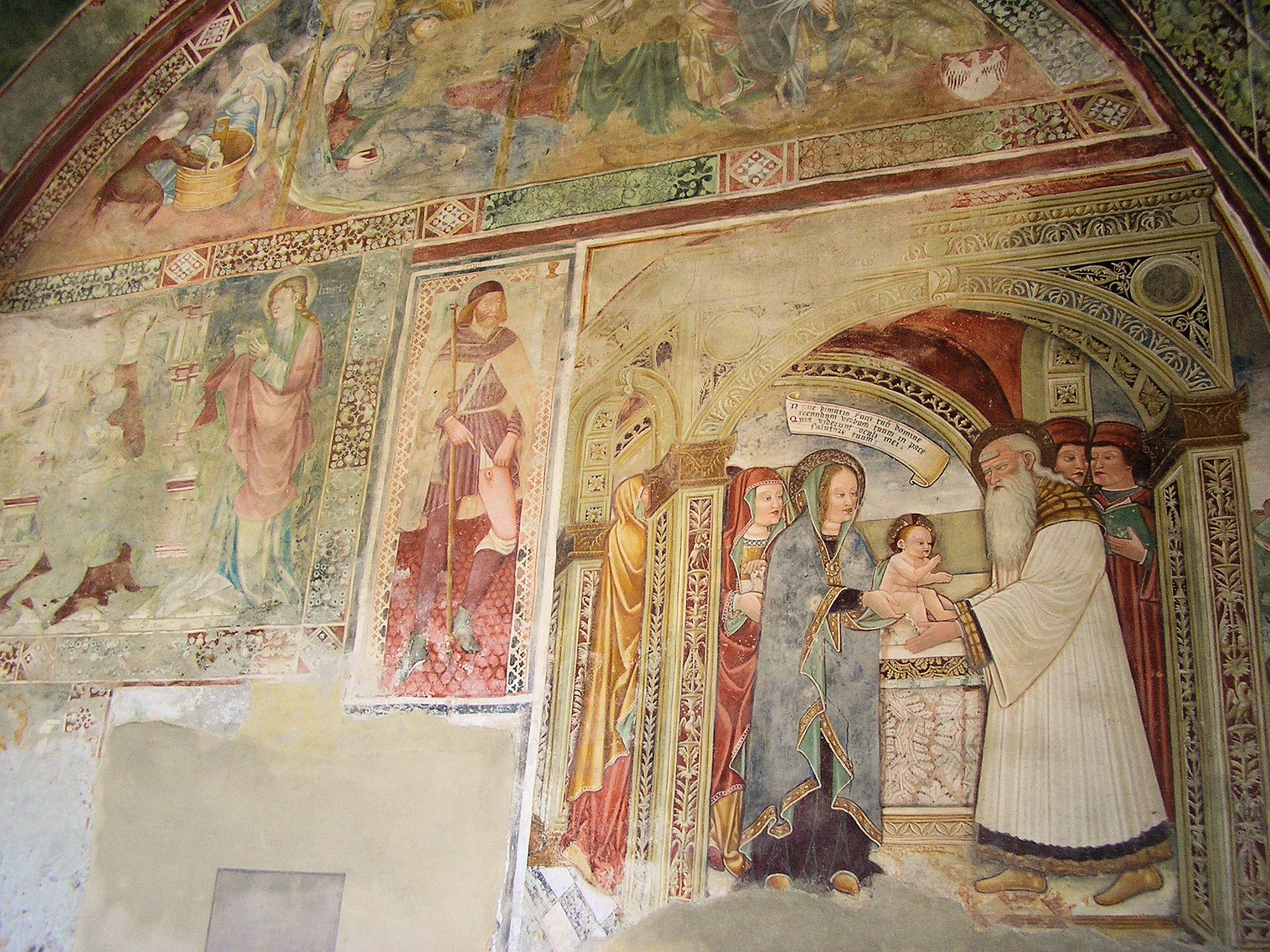
Santa Maria in Selva mural

== Main sights ==
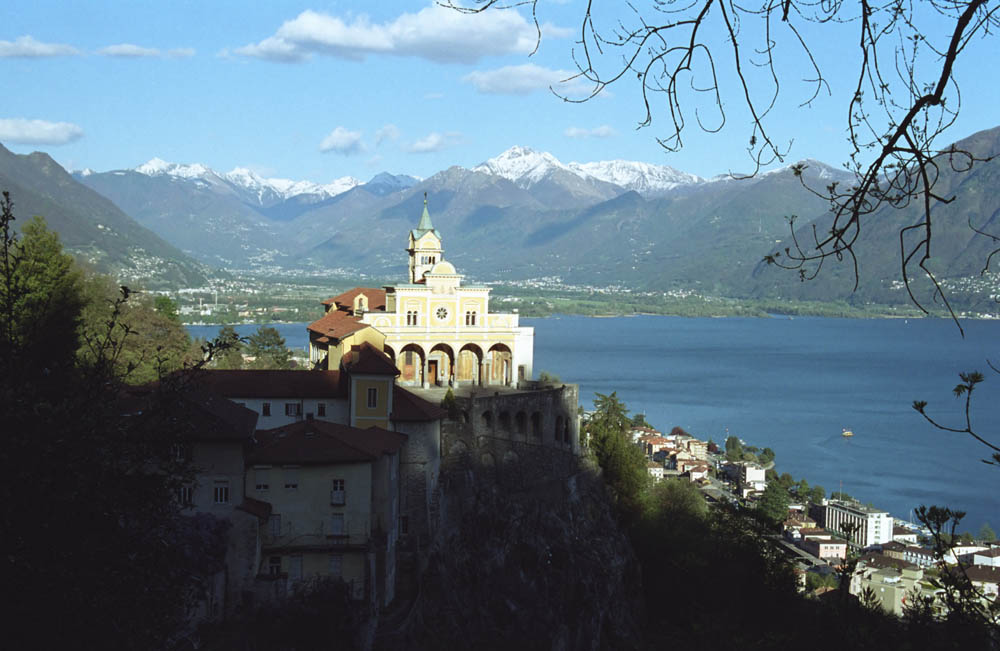
Madonna del Sasso

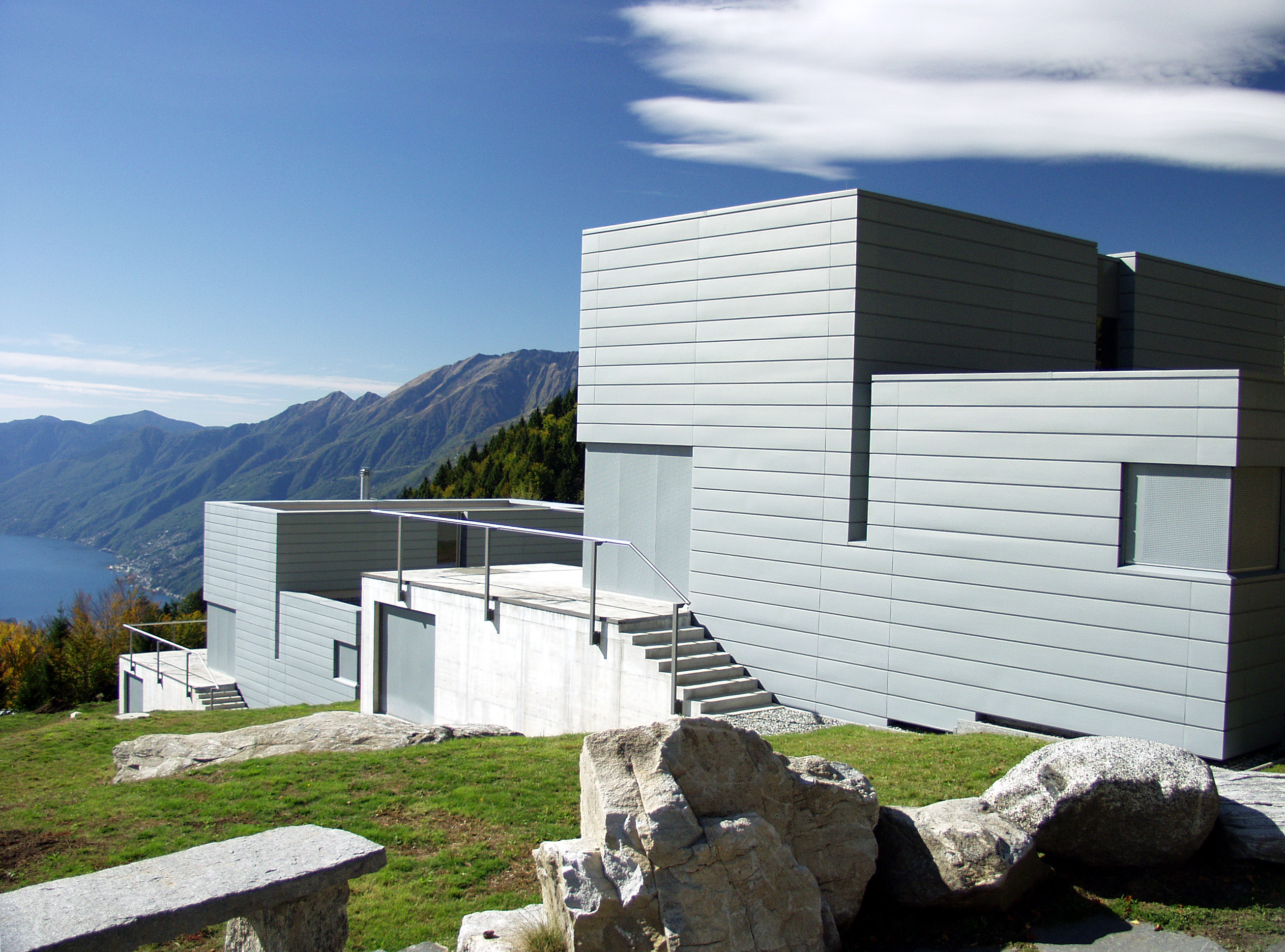
Cardada

=== Astrovia Locarno ===
The Astrovia Locarno is a 1 : 1,000,000,000 scale model of the Solar System. The Sun can be found at the end of Via Gioacchino Respini, where the cycle path, which runs alongside the river Maggia, starts. Pluto, the final planet in the model, can be found 6 kilometres (4 miles) away from this starting point in the village of Tegna.

=== Madonna del Sasso, Cardada and Cimetta ===
The sanctuary of Madonna del Sasso in Orselina above the city is the principal sight and goal of pilgrimage in the city.

The founding of the sanctuary goes back to a vision of the Virgin Mary that the Franciscan brother Bartolomeo d'Ivrea experienced on the night of 14/15 August 1480. The interior is highly decorated, and a platform has views of the city.

The Locarno–Madonna del Sasso funicular links Locarno city centre with the Madonna del Sasso sanctuary and Orselina. From Orselina, a cable car operates to the top of Cardada (el. 1,340 m (4,400 ft)), and a chair lift goes further to the top of Cimetta (el. 1,671 m (5,482 ft)).

=== Castello Visconteo ===
Castello Visconteo, on the edge of the old town, was built in the 12th century, probably as the residence of a Captain Orelli, who remained true to the Emperor. In 1260, it fell into the hands of the Ghibellines. In 1342, the Visconti of Milan, for whom it is now named, attacked the castle from both the land and the lakeside and took it. It first came into the hands of the Eidgenossen in 1503. Today, only a fifth of the original structure remains. Most of that dates from the 15th and 16th centuries. Only the foundation remains from the original structure.

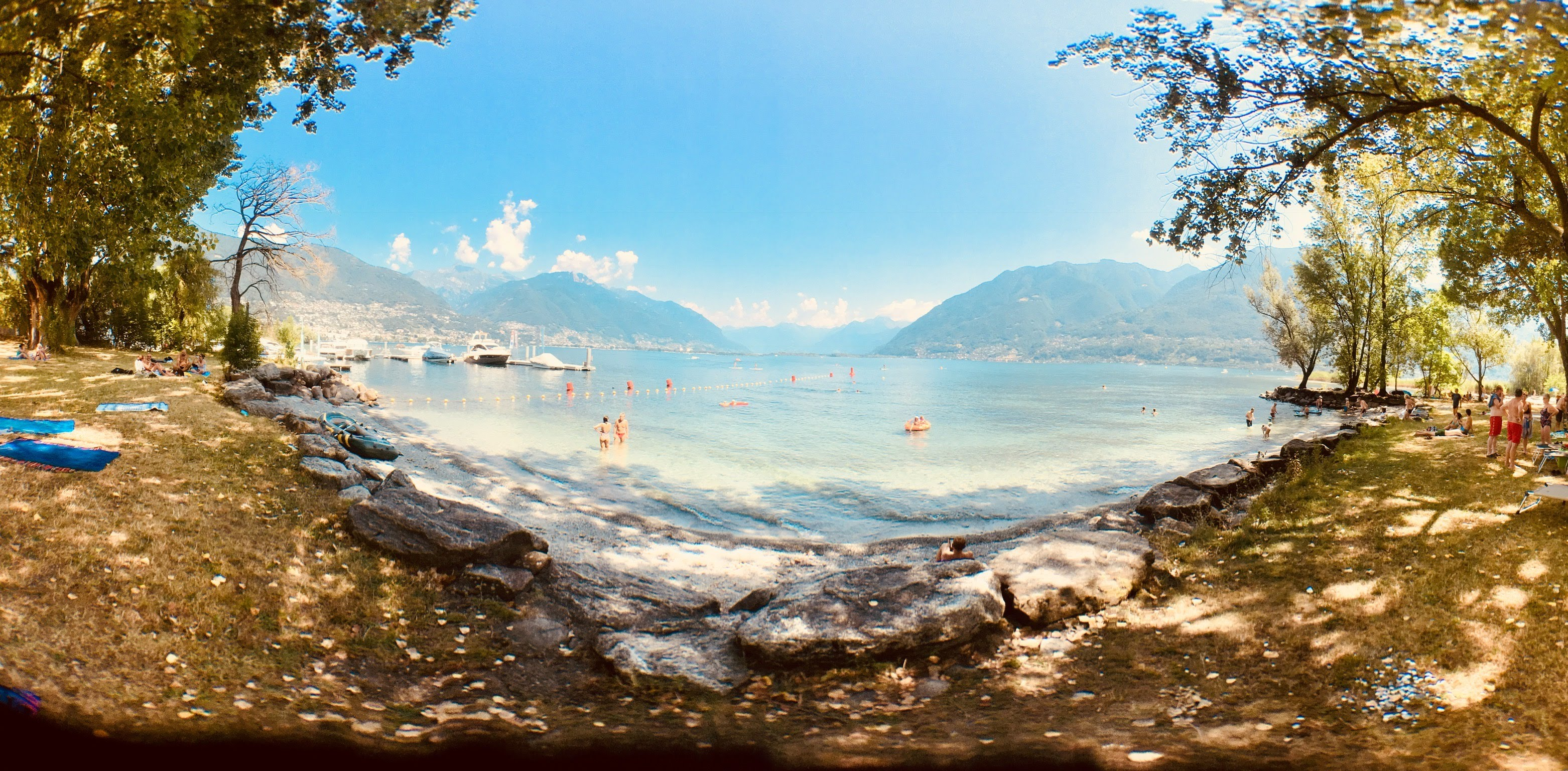
Locarno beach

== Politics ==
In the 2007 federal election, the most popular party was the FDP, which received 34.88% of the vote. The next three most popular parties were the SP (19.72%), the CVP (18.75%) and the Ticino League (9.54%). In the federal election, a total of 3,303 votes were cast, and the voter turnout was 40.5%.

In the 2007 Gran Consiglio election, there were a total of 8,555 registered voters in Locarno, of which 4,291 or 50.2% voted. 90 blank ballots and 15 null ballots were cast, leaving 4,186 valid ballots in the election. The most popular party was the PLRT which received 913 or 21.8% of the vote. The next three most popular parties were: the SSI (with 822 or 19.6%), the PS (with 790 or 18.9%) and the PPD+GenGiova (with 703 or 16.8%).

In the 2007 Consiglio di Stato election, 66 blank ballots and 23 null ballots were cast, leaving 4,202 valid ballots in the election. The most popular party was the PS, which received 946 or 22.5% of the vote. The next three most popular parties were the PLRT (with 837 or 19.9%), the SSI (with 768 or 18.3%) and the PPD (with 714 or 17.0%).

== Economy ==
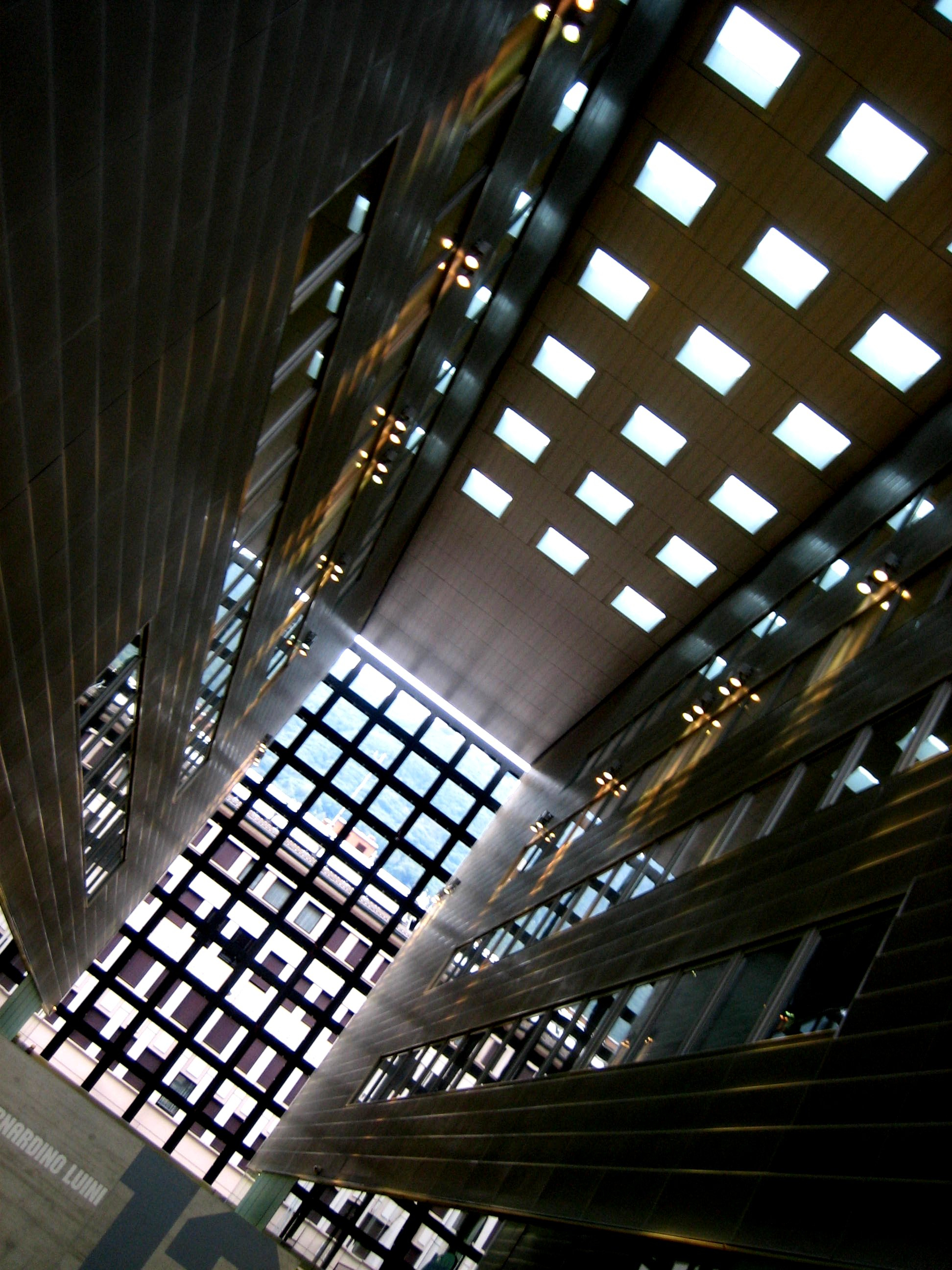
Office building in Locarno

As of 2007, Locarno had an unemployment rate of 5.93%. As of 2005, there were 86 people employed in the primary economic sector and about 23 businesses involved in this sector. 2,385 people were employed in the secondary sector, and there were 158 businesses in this sector. 7,338 people were employed in the tertiary sector, with 920 businesses in this sector. 6,688 residents of the municipality were employed in some capacity, of whom females made up 46.6% of the workforce.

In 2000, 7,550 workers commuted into the municipality and 2,864 workers who commuted away. The municipality is a net importer of workers, with about 2.6 workers entering the municipality for every one leaving. About 12.1% of the workforce coming into Locarno are coming from outside Switzerland, while none of the locals counted in the census commutes out of Switzerland for work. Of the working population, 10.5% used public transportation to get to work, and 44.1% used a private car.

As of 2009, there were 30 hotels in Locarno with a total of 777 rooms and 1,536 beds.

== Religion ==
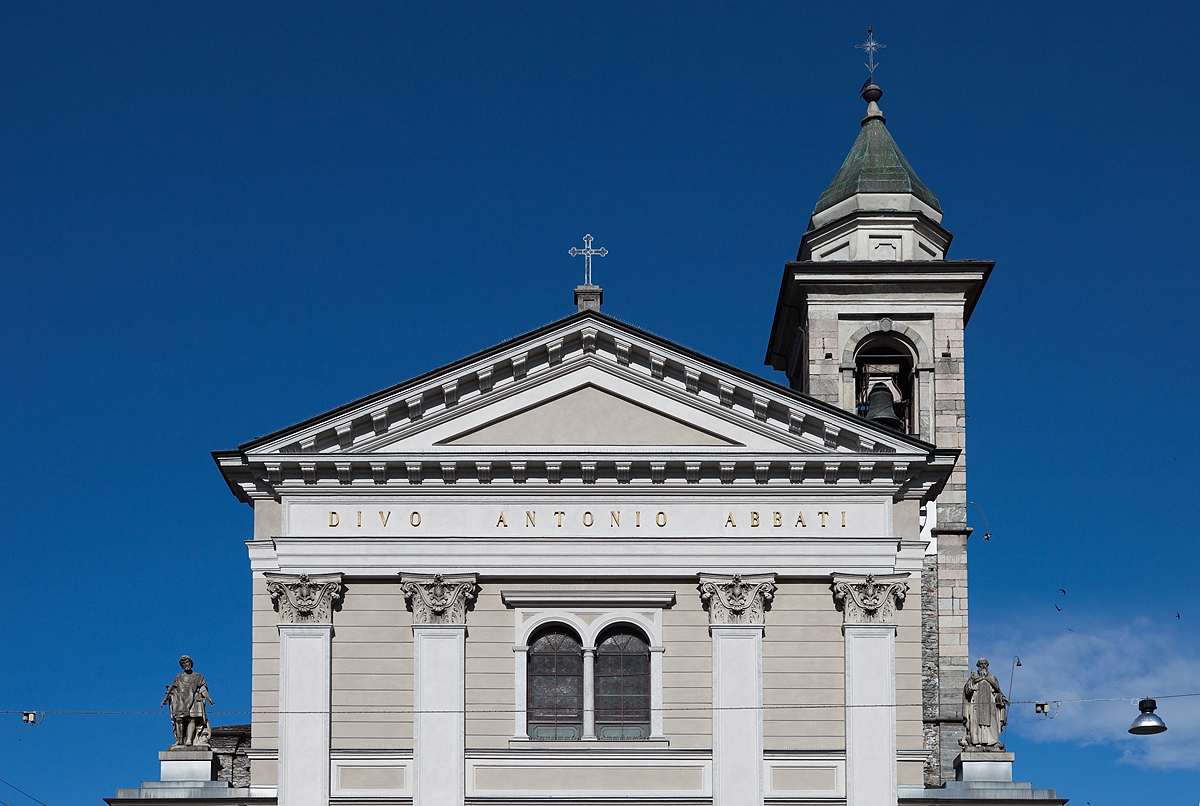
Church of S. Antonio Abate

From the 2000 census, 10,179 or 69.9% were Roman Catholic, while 1,072 or 7.4% belonged to the Swiss Reformed Church. There are 2,307 individuals (or about 15.84% of the population) who belong to another church (not listed on the census), and 1,003 individuals (or about 6.89% of the population) did not answer the question.

== Education ==
In Locarno about 57.1% of the population (between age 25–64) have completed either non-mandatory upper secondary education or additional higher education (either university or a Fachhochschule).

In Locarno, there were a total of 2,210 students (as of 2009). The Ticino education system provides up to three years of non-mandatory kindergarten, and in Locarno, there were 292 children in kindergarten. The primary school program lasts for five years and includes both a standard school and a special school. In the village, 648 students attended the standard primary schools and 65 students attended the special school. In the lower secondary school system, students either attend a two-year middle school followed by a two-year pre-apprenticeship or they attend a four-year program to prepare for higher education. There were 512 students in the two-year middle school and 10 in their pre-apprenticeship, while 203 students were in the four-year advanced program.

The upper secondary school includes several options, but at the end of the upper secondary program, a student will be prepared to enter a trade or to continue to a university or college. In Ticino, vocational students may either attend school while working on their internship or apprenticeship (which takes three or four years) or may attend school followed by an internship or apprenticeship (which takes one year as a full-time student or one and a half to two years as a part-time student). 146 vocational students were attending school full-time and 293 who attend part-time.

The professional program lasts three years and prepares a student for a job in engineering, nursing, computer science, business, tourism and similar fields. There were 41 students in the professional program.

As of 2000, there were 1,484 students in Locarno who came from another municipality, while 405 residents attended schools outside the municipality.

Locarno is home to the Biblioteca Cantonale Locarno library. The library has (as of 2008) 122,115 books or other media, and loaned out 97,667 items in the same year. It was open a total of 264 days with an average of 44 hours per week during that year.

== Transport ==
=== Air ===
Locarno Airport is currently operating only as a military airport. The nearest passenger airport is Milan Malpensa Airport, which is located 114 km south of Locarno.

=== Rail ===
Locarno railway station, situated in Muralto, is served by the Swiss Federal Railways' Giubiasco–Locarno railway, a branch from the Gotthard railway. Underground, there is a terminal for the Domodossola–Locarno railway, a metre gauge link to Italy operated in Switzerland by the Regional Bus and Rail Company of Ticino.

== Crime ==
In 2014, the crime rate, of the over 200 crimes listed in the Swiss Criminal Code (running from murder, robbery and assault to accepting bribes and election fraud), in Locarno was 77.9 per thousand residents, which was 20.6% higher than the national average (64.6). During the same period, the rate of drug crimes was 27.2 per thousand residents. This rate is 138.6% greater than the rate in the district, 209.1% greater than the cantonal rate and 174.7% greater than the national rate. The rate of violations of immigration, visa and work permit laws was 2.6 per thousand residents. This rate is lower than average, at only 72.2% of the rate in the canton and only 53.1% of the rate for the entire country.

== Sports ==
Locarno's football team is FC Locarno. In 2018, the club filed for bankruptcy, which meant an automatic relegation to the ninth and lowest tier of Swiss football. As of 2024, FC Locarno competes in the fifth-highest tier of Swiss football, 2. Liga Interregional.

== Image gallery ==
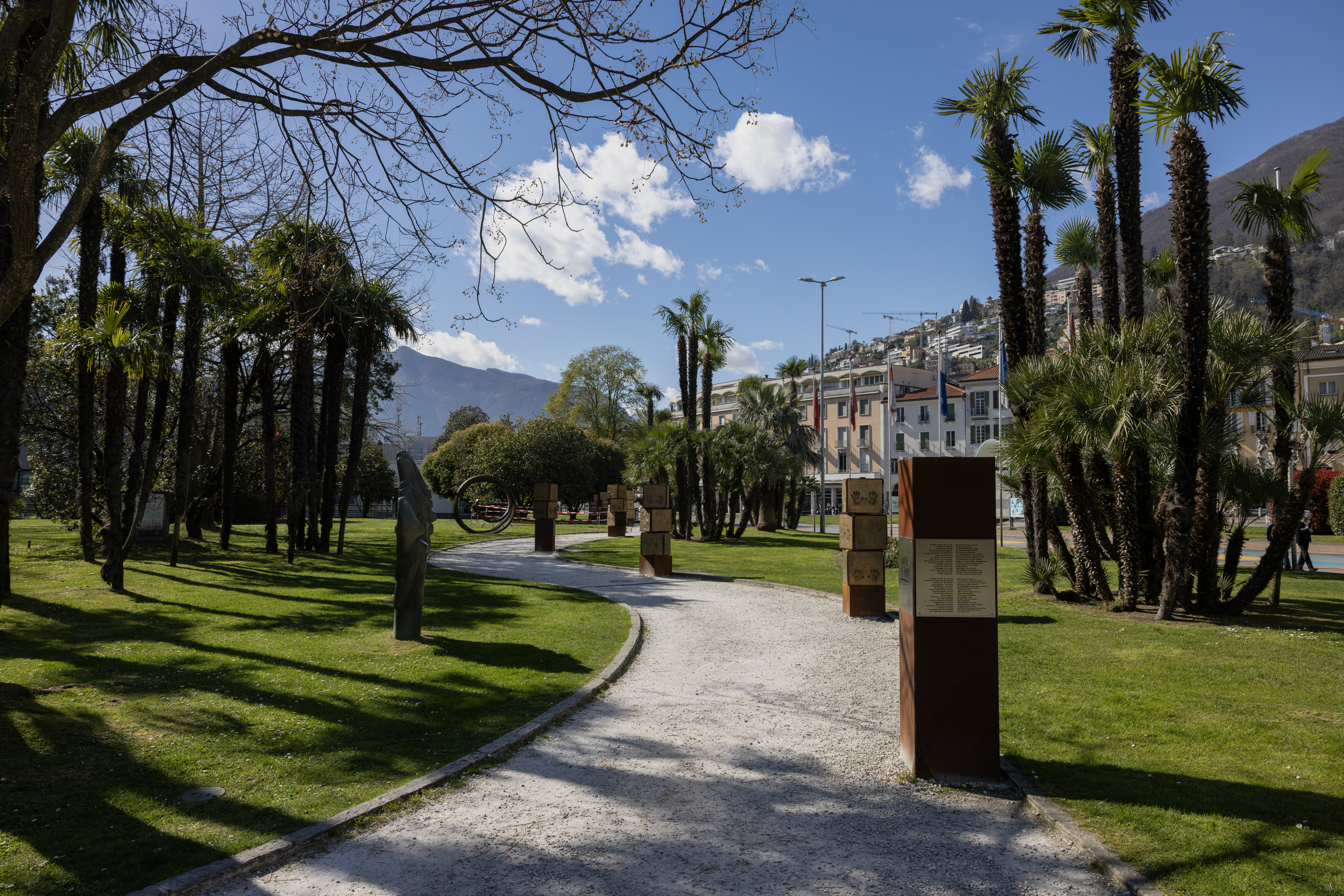
Walk of Fame Locarno is a collection of the handprints made by some of the top musicians who have visited Locarno for the Moon and Stars music festival.

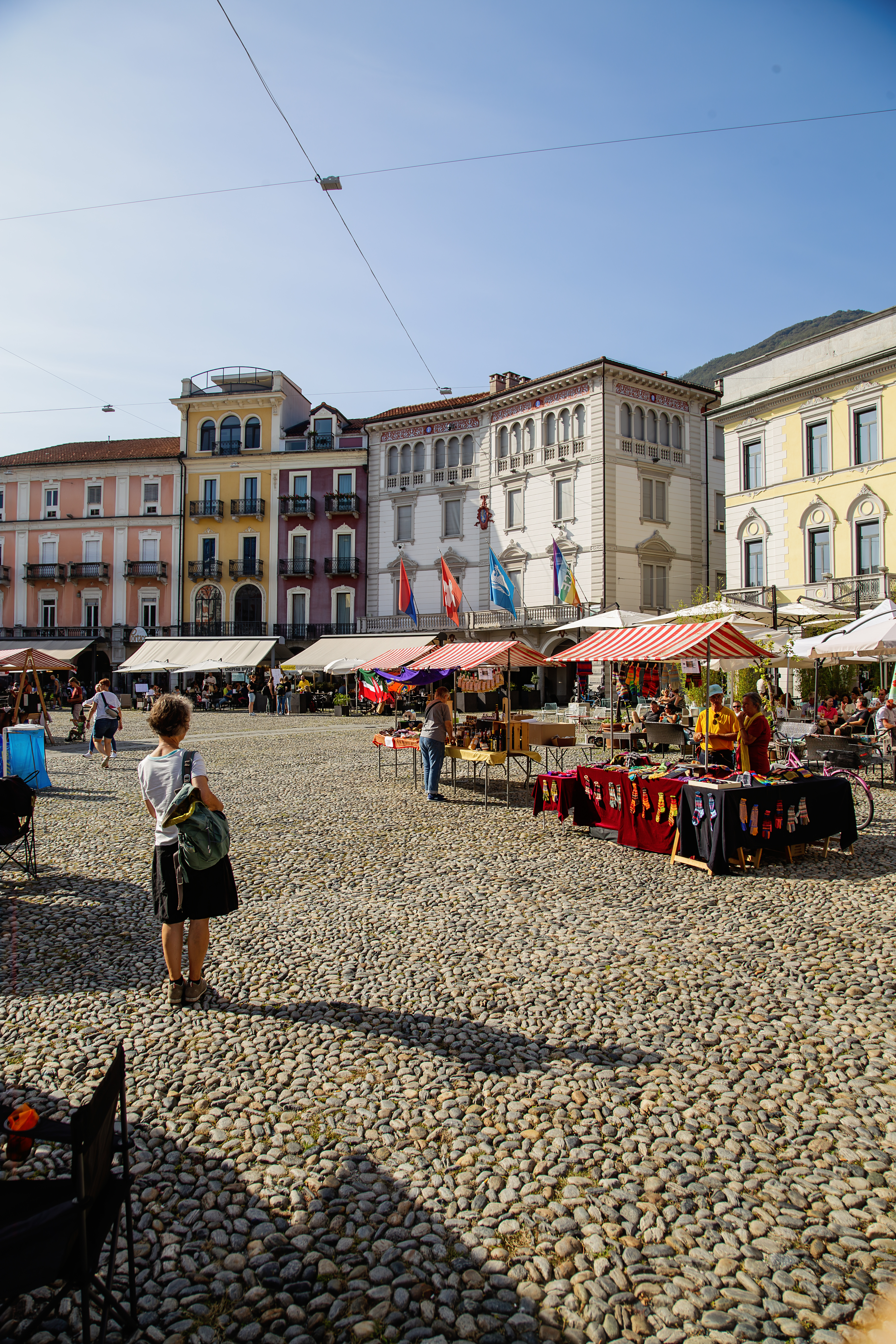
A landmark and the heart of Locarno. A meeting place for visitors and locals and a venue for major events.

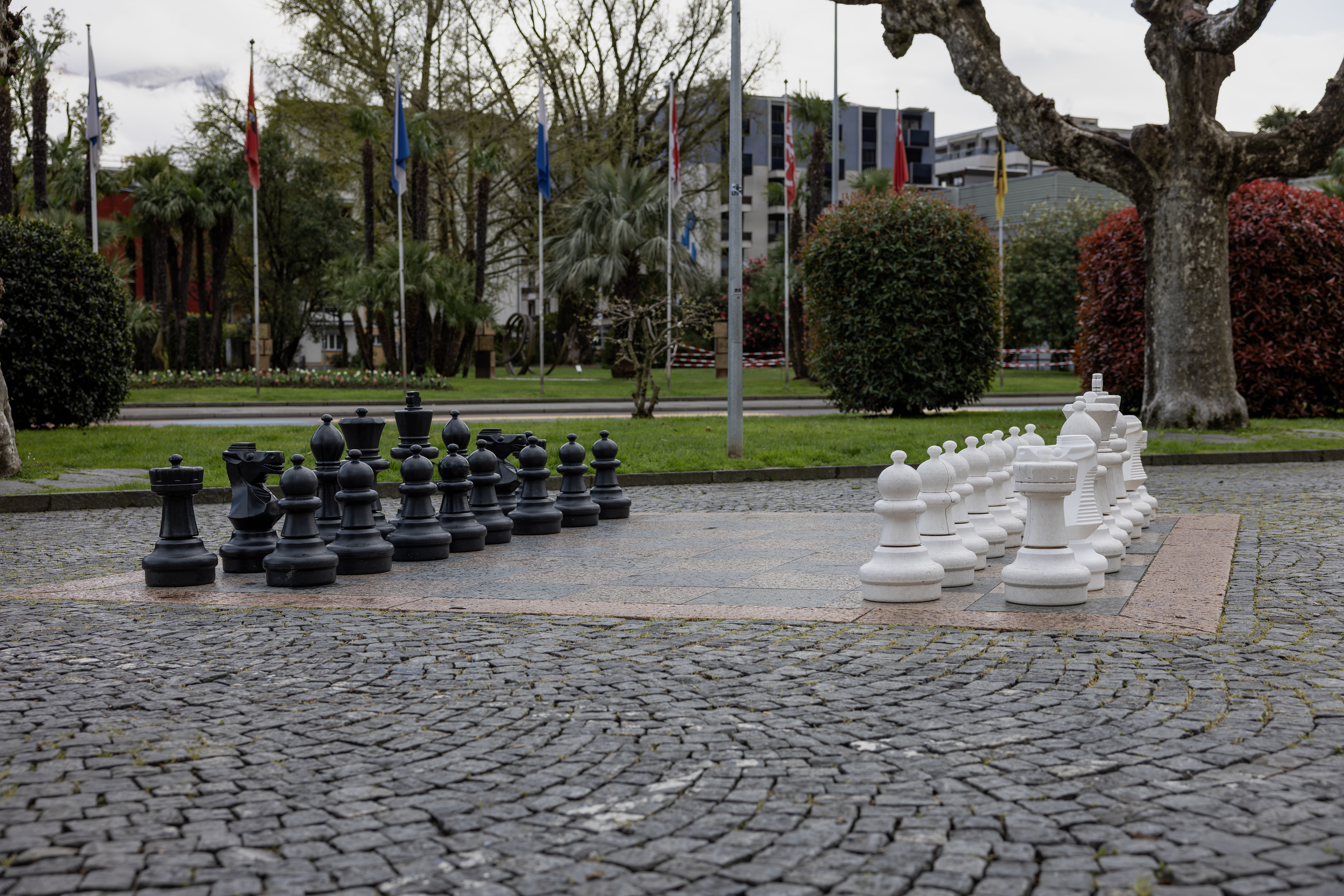
Giant Chess Boards on the street in Locarno in Piazza Filippo Franzoni

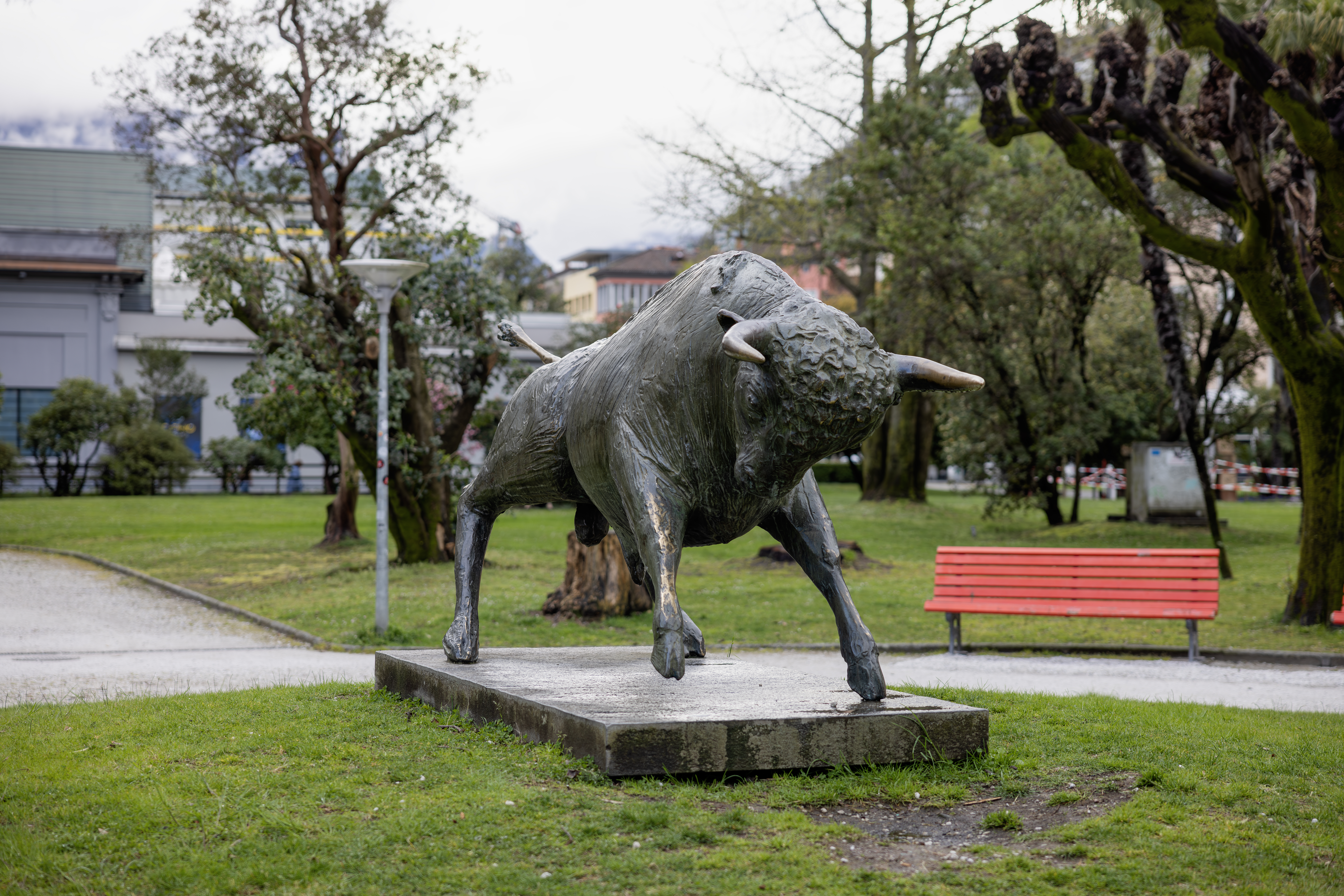
In 1975, on the occasion of the 50th peace conference between Germany, France, Belgium, England, Italy, Poland and Czechoslovakia, the artist Remo Rossi donated the Toro (Bull) sculpture to the city of Locarno.

Conference room of the former Government Palace in Locarno, now headquarters of the Società Elettrica Sopracenerina

Tower interior of the Visconti Castle in Locarno, Switzerland

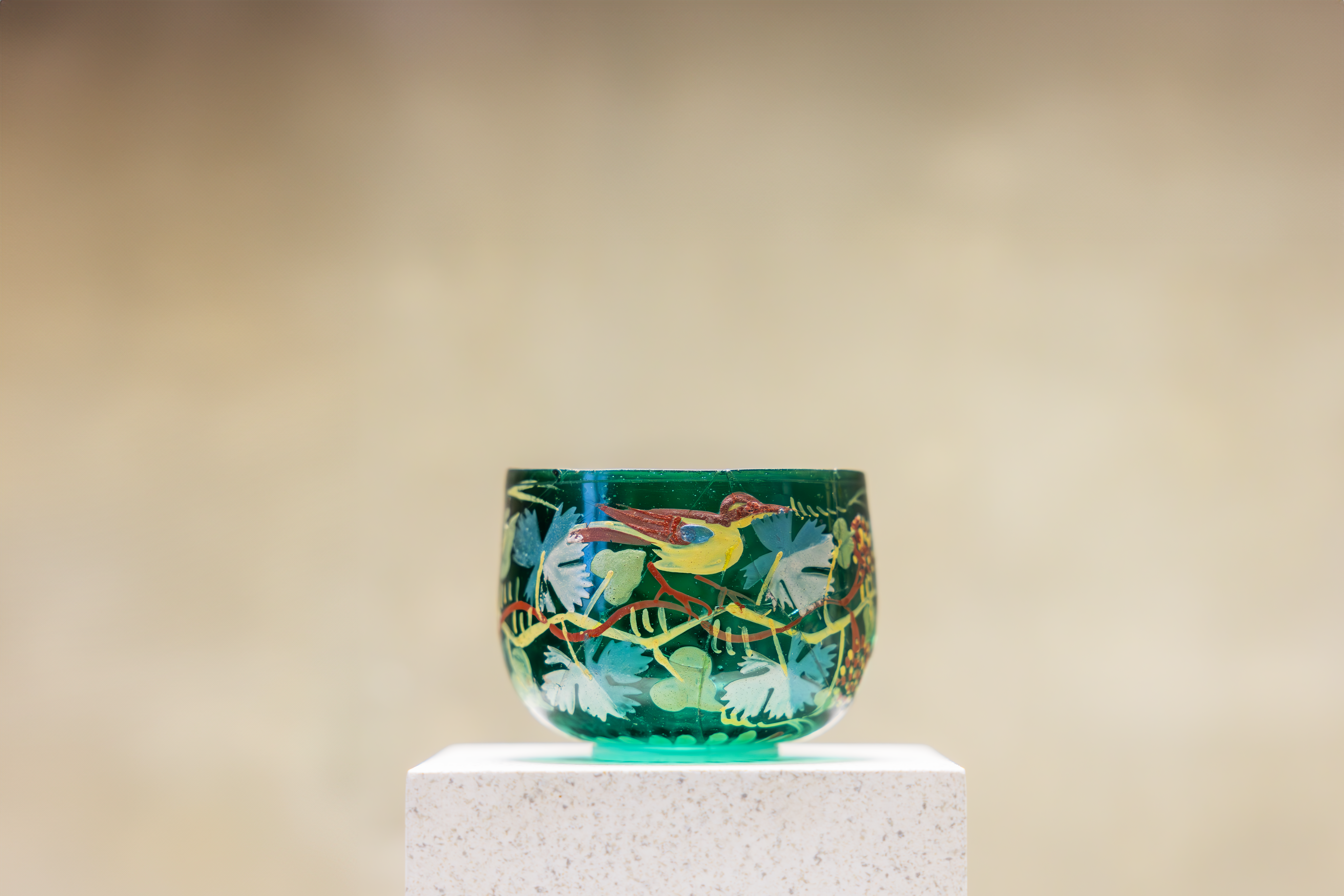
Cylindrical cup, so-called "of the birds". Imperial Age, Roman culture (1st–4th century AD) Muralto, Villa Liverpool. Discovery 1936. Find from 20–50 AD preserved inside the Visconti castle.

== Notable people ==
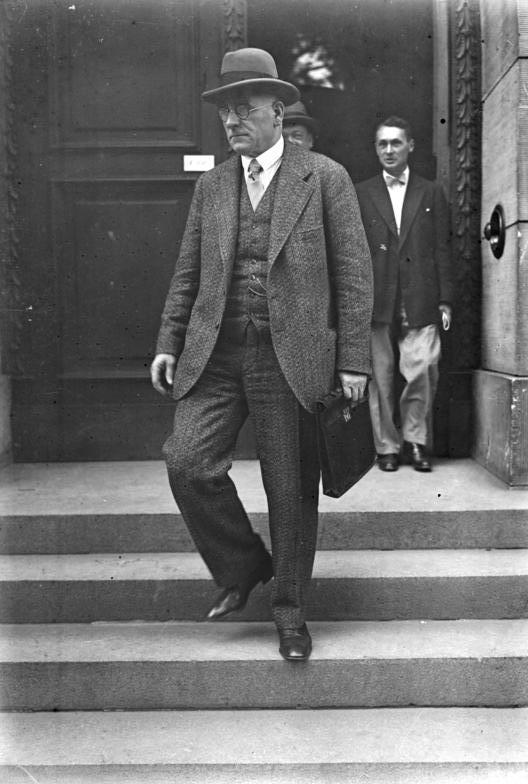
Otto Braun, 1930

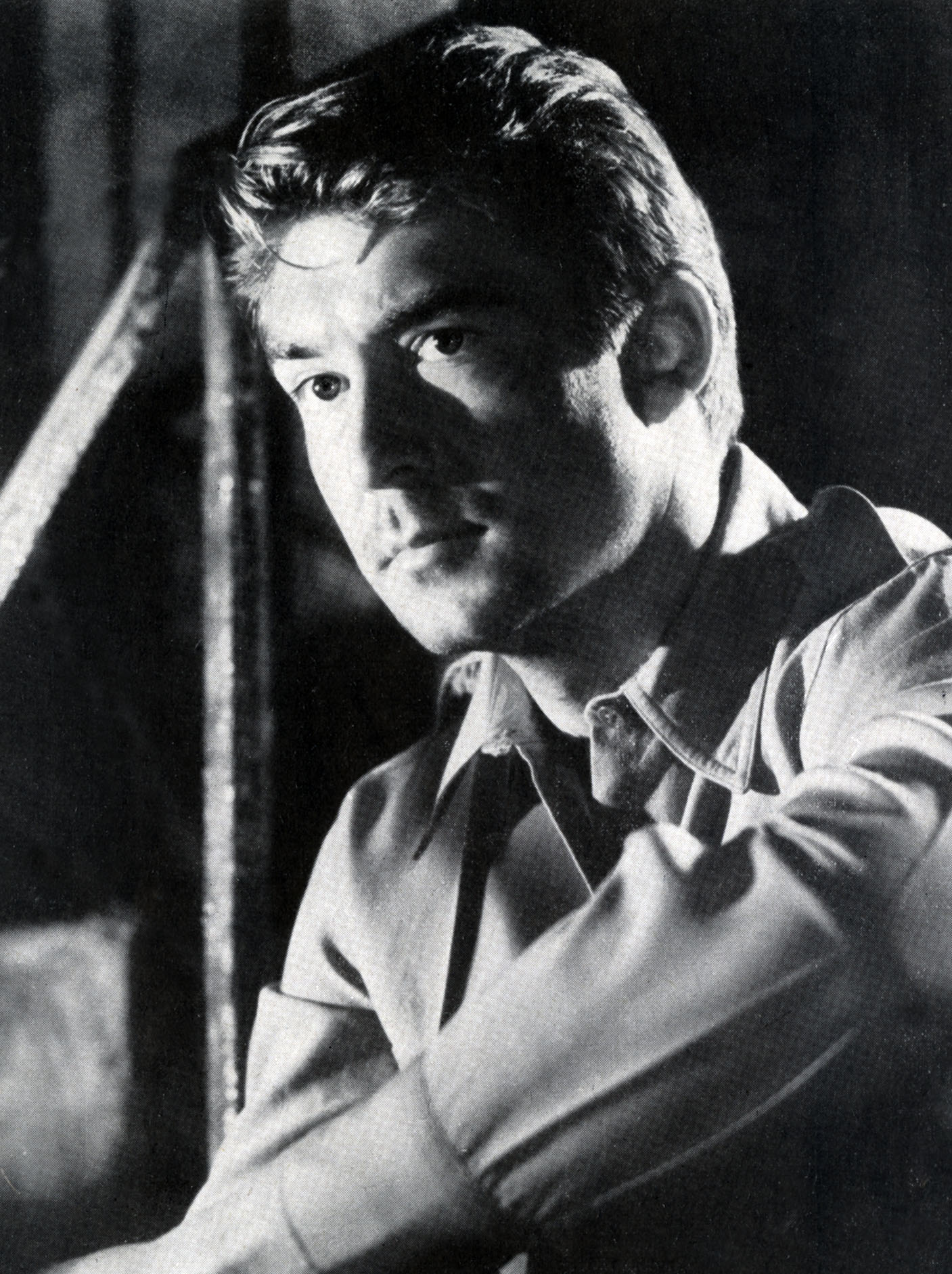
Mirko Ellis, 1953

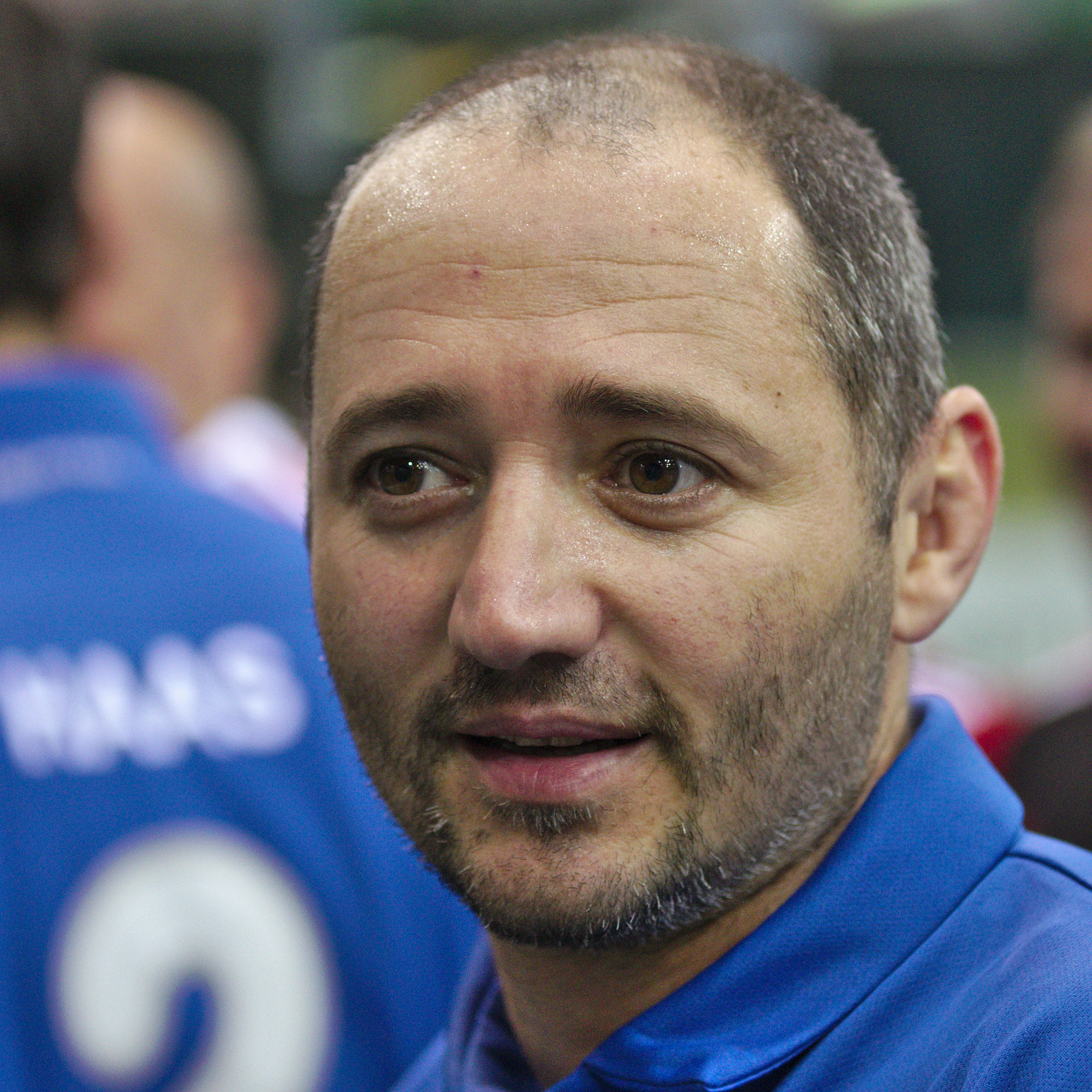
Oliver Neuville, 2014

- William Bally (1796 in Locarno – 1858), a Swiss sculptor and phrenologist active in Manchester, UK
- Teresina Bontempi (Locarno, 1883–1968), an Italian-speaking Swiss writer and editor
- Otto Braun (1872–1955 in Locarno), German politician, Prime Minister of Prussia 1920 to 1932, lived in exile from 1933
- Franz Anton Bustelli (1723 in Locarno – 1763), modeller for the Bavarian Nymphenburg Porcelain Manufactory from 1754
- Mirko Ellis (1923 in Locarno – 2014), a Swiss-Italian film, stage and television actor
- Robert Gilbert (1899–1978 in Minusio), a German composer of light music, lyricist, singer and actor
- Fritz Glarner (1899–1972 in Locarno), a Swiss-American painter
- Patricia Highsmith (1921–1995), an American novelist and short story writer, lived in Locarno from 1982
- Walo Lüönd (1927–2012 in Locarno), a Swiss movie actor
- Mattli (1907 in Locarno – 1982), also known as Jo Mattli, a Swiss-born and London-based fashion designer
- Giuseppe Antonio Orelli (1700 or 1706 in Locarno – died after 1776), a Swiss-Italian painter, mainly of sacred subjects
- Raffaello Ossola (born 1954 in Locarno), a painter, lives in Italy
- Francesco Piemontesi (born 1983 in Locarno), a Swiss pianist
- Giovanni Battista Pioda (1808 in Locarno – 1882), a Swiss politician, member of the Swiss Federal Council 1857–1864
- Karl Rapp (1882–1962 in Locarno), a German founder and owner of Rapp Motorenwerke GmbH
- Remo Rossi (1909 in Locarno – 1982), Swiss sculptor
- Livio Vacchini (1933 in Locarno – 2007), a Swiss architect
- Felice Varini (born 1952 in Locarno), a Paris-based Swiss artist

Sport

- Iradj Alexander (born 1975 in Locarno), a race car driver
- Đurđica Bjedov (born 1947), a retired Yugoslav swimmer of Croatian nationality, lives in Locarno
- Charyl Chappuis (born 1992 in Locarno), a Thai footballer, won two consecutive AFF Championships with Thailand
- Saulo Decarli (born 1992 in Locarno), a Swiss footballer, won almost 200 club caps
- Claudio Mezzadri (born 1965 in Locarno), a retired professional tennis player
- Oliver Neuville (born 1973 in Locarno), a German retired footballer, won 519 club caps and 69 for the German national team
- Anamarija Petričević (born 1972), a retired Croatian swimmer, has lived in Locarno since 1999
- Noè Ponti (born 2001 in Locarno), a Swiss Olympic swimmer

== Sister cities ==
Locarno is twinned with:

Lompoc, California

Vevey, Switzerland

Montecatini Terme, Italy

Venice, Italy

Urbino, Italy

Gagra, Georgia

Karlovy Vary, Czech Republic

== See also ==
- Locarno Treaties
- List of cities in Switzerland
- Po Plain
- Tourism in Switzerland
