= Mariot =

Mariot is a surname with uncertain origin and meaning, found more often in England, France and north of Italy, suggesting its roots are either in France, due to the pronunciation, or England, due to its etymology. Notable people with the name include:

== Surname ==
- John Mariot (unknown date of birth), mayor of the town of Wallingford, Berkshire (circa 1300) and member of the English house of Commons in 1306 - 1341
- Michael Mariot (born 1988), American professional baseball pitcher
- Yves Mariot (1948–2000), French football player

== Given name ==
- Mariot Arbuthnot (1711–1794)
- Mariot Leslie (born 1954), British former diplomat

== See also ==
- Marriott (disambiguation)
