= Mariotte =

Mariotte is a surname. Notable people with the surname include:

- Antoine Mariotte (1875–1944), French composer
- Edme Mariotte (c. 1620–1684), French physicist and priest
- Jeff Mariotte (born 1955), American author

== Other ==
- Mariotte (crater), a lunar crater
- French submarine Mariotte

== See also ==
- Marriott (disambiguation)
