= List of mayors of Locarno =

Coat of arms of Locarno

This is a list of mayors of the city of Locarno, Switzerland. The sindaco chairs the municipio, the executive of Locarno.

Mayor (Sindaco) of Locarno
Term	Mayor	Lifespan	Party	Notes
1803–04	Bartolomeo Varenna			
1805–15	Giuseppe Franzoni			
1815–31	Francesco Fanciola			
1831–39	Gian Gaspare Nessi			
1839–40	Pietro Bustelli			
1840–45	Bartolomeo Rusca			
1845–48	Giuseppe Mariotta			
1848–49	Pietro Romerio			
1849–55	Felice Bianchetti			
1855–61	Luigi Rusca			
1861–62	Pietro Romerio			
1862–65	Luigi Rusca			
1865–80	Bartolomeo Varenna			
1880–92	Giuseppe Volonterio			
1892–95	Giovan Battista Volonterio			
1895–1914	Francesco Balli	(1852–1924)		
1914–16	Giovanni Pedrazzini	(1852–1922)		
1916–20	Vittore Pedrotta	(1869–1942)		
1920–61	Giovan Battista Rusca	(1881–1961)		
1961–79	Carlo Speziali	(1921–1998)		
1979–96	Diego Scacchi			
1996–2004	Marco Balerna			
2004–15	Carla Speziali	(born 1961)	PLR	daughter of Carlo Speziali
2015–	Alain Scherrer			
