= Mariotto =

Mariotto is a given name and surname. Notable people with the name include:

== Given name ==
- Mariotto Albertinelli (1474–1515), Italian Renaissance painter
- Mariotto di Nardo (fl. 1388–1424), Florentine painter in the Florentine Gothic style
- Mariotto Segni (born 1939), Italian politician and professor of civil law

== Surname ==
- Angela Mariotto, statistician
- Bernardino di Mariotto (1478–1566), Italian painter
- Danilo Mariotto (born 1996), Brazilian footballer
- Sara Mariotto (born 1997), Italian professional racing cyclist
