= Marriott =

Marriott may refer to:

== People ==
- Marriott (surname), includes a list of notable people with the surname

=== Given name ===
- Marriott Brosius (1843–1901), American politician
- Marriott Cooke (1852–1931), British doctor and Commissioner in Lunacy
- Marriott Dalway (1832–1914), Irish politician
- Marriott Edgar (1880–1951), British poet, scriptwriter and comedian
- Marriott Fawckner Nicholls (1898–1969), English surgeon
- Marriott Ogle Tarbotton (1834–1887), British civil engineer

== Corporations ==
- Marriott Corporation, founded as Hot Shoppes, Inc. in 1927; split into Marriott International and Host Marriott Corporation in 1993
- Marriott International, international hotel company
  - Marriott Hotels & Resorts, flagship brand of Marriott International
  - Marriott Vacations Worldwide Corporation, a timeshare company, formerly a division of Marriott International
- Host Marriott Corporation, lodging real estate investment trust, now known as Host Hotels & Resorts
  - HMSHost, operator of airport concession services, spun off from Host Marriott Corporation

== Places ==
=== Canada ===
- Marriott, Saskatchewan, a hamlet
- Mount Marriott, British Columbia
- Rural Municipality of Marriott No. 317, Saskatchewan

=== Elsewhere ===
- Marriott, Utah, U.S.
- Marriott Reef, Australia
- Thorpe Marriott, England, U.K.

== Other uses ==
- Marriott (album), a 1976 album by Steve Marriott
- Marriott School, a historic school in Virginia, U.S.
- Marriott School of Business, located in Provo, Utah, U.S.

== See also ==
- Mariotte (disambiguation)
