= MTP =

MTP or mtp may refer to:

== Organisations ==
- Mouvement pour la Tolérance et le Progrès (Movement for Tolerance and Progress), a political party in Burkina Faso
- Międzynarodowe Targi Poznańskie (Poznań International Fair), a trade fair in Poland
- Marseille Trop Puissant, an Olympique de Marseille supporters group
- Movimiento Todos por la Patria, an Argentine guerrilla movement active from 1974 to 1976

== Places ==
- Marsa complex (MaltaPost postal code), Malta
- Mare Tranquillitatis pit, the Moon
- Mount Pleasant station (Iowa) (station code), US
- Mount Pleasant, South Carolina, US
- Montpellier, France

== Science ==
- Massive transfusion protocol, a form of blood transfusion
- Medial tibial plateau, at the upper end of the tibia
- Medical termination of pregnancy, the termination of a pregnancy by the removal or expulsion of an embryo or fetus from the uterus
- Metatarsophalangeal joint, the joint between the foot and the toe
- Methadone treatment program, a form of treatment for heroin addiction
- Microsomal triglyceride transfer protein, a liver protein linked to LDL release
- Mitochondrial permeability transition pore
- Mitochondrial trifunctional protein, a protein which catalyzes several reactions in beta oxidation
- Microtiter plates or Microtitre plates, as defined by the SBS standard, used in biopharmaceutical applications
- Multiply Twinned Particles, see Decahedral MTP and Icosahedral MTP
- Mussel toxic peptide, a marine biotoxin

== Technology ==
- Meteosat Transition Program, the EUMETSAT programme responsible for the Meteosat system of satellites
- Missile Test Project, a US Air Force program for tracking missiles on the Eastern Test Range
- Message Transfer Part, part of Signaling System 7 (SS7) used for communication in the public switched telephone network (PSTN)
- Multi-Terrain Pattern, military camouflage developed for the British military

=== Computing ===
- Mail Transfer Protocol, an obsolete network protocol that has been replaced by SMTP
- Media Transfer Protocol, a protocol for transferring media files, including images and music, between portable devices and computers
- Micro Transport Protocol (μTP), a BitTorrent peer-to-peer file sharing protocol
- Multi-fiber termination push-on, a type of fiber cable terminator optical fiber connector
- Multipurpose Transaction Protocol, a proprietary data transport protocol produced by Data Expedition, Inc.

== Other uses ==
- Meet the Press, an American television program
- Macy's Thanksgiving Day Parade, an annual parade in New York City, US
- Mid-term plan, a firm's business plan for the next 2 or 3 years, usually based on quantitative risk management
- Sơn Tùng M-TP (born 1994), Vietnamese singer
- Wichí Lhamtés Nocten (ISO 639-3 code: mtp), a language
