= Marius =

Marius may refer to:

== People ==
- Marius (name), a male given name, a Roman clan name and family name, and a modern name or surname
- Gaius Marius (c. 157–86 BC), Roman statesman, seven times consul.
- Marcus Aurelius Marius, emperor of the Gallic Empire, 269

== Arts and entertainment ==
- Marius (play), a 1929 play by Marcel Pagnol
- "Marius" (short story), a 1957 story by Poul Anderson
- Marius (1931 film), a French adaptation of Pagnol's play, directed by Alexander Korda
- Marius (2013 film), a French adaptation of Pagnol's play, directed by Daniel Auteuil

== Places ==
- Marius (Laconia), a town of ancient Laconia, Greece
- Măriuș, a village in Valea Vinului, Satu Mare County, Romania
- Marius (crater), on the Moon
- Marius Hills, on the Moon

== Other uses ==
- Marius (commando), Alain Alivon (born 1965), French Navy officer
- Marius (giraffe), a giraffe euthanized at the Copenhagen Zoo in 2014
- Marius Pontmercy, Fictional character from Les Misérables

== See also ==
- Mario (disambiguation)
- Maria (disambiguation)
- Mary (disambiguation)
