= Marius (name) =

Male given name and surname

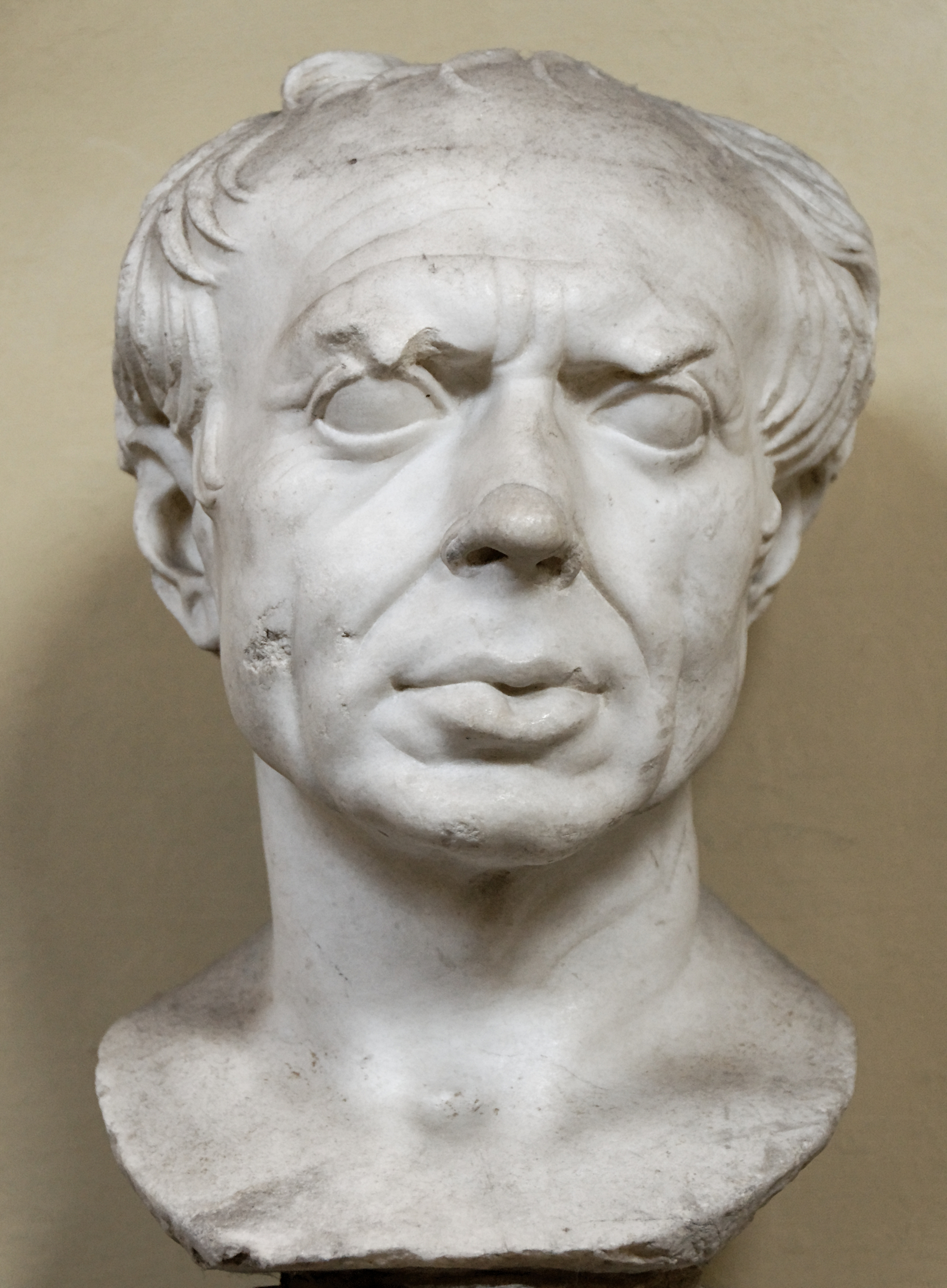
- Bust of general Gaius Marius. He was the most prominent member of the gens Maria bearing name Marius.
- Pronunciation: Classical Latin: [ˈma.ri.ʊs]
- Gender: Male
- Language: Latin

Origin
- Region of origin: Roman Empire

Other names
- Alternative spelling: Marivs
- Variant forms: Mario, Mário, Marios, Mariusz, Marian
- Derived: Mars, mas, or mar

Marius is a male name, a Roman family name, and a modern given name.

The name Marius was used by members of the Roman gens Maria. It is thought to be derived from either the Roman war god Mars or from the Latin root mas or maris meaning "male". It may also derive from the Latin word mare meaning "sea", the plural of which is maria.

In Christian times, it was interpreted as a masculine form of the unrelated feminine given name Maria, from the Hebrew Miriam, Aramaic variant Mariam, and used alongside it.

Today, the name Marius is a common given name in Romania, Norway, and Lithuania. The name is also used in the Philippines, France, Denmark, Germany, the Netherlands, and South Africa.

The Greek name Marios (Μάριος), the Italian and Spanish name Mario, the Polish name Mariusz, the Portuguese name Mário and the Catalan name Màrius are all derived from Marius.

== People ==
Notable people with the name include:

=== Romans ===
- Gaius Marius (157–86 BC), Roman general
- Gaius Marius the Younger (ca. 110/108–82 BC), son of Gaius Marius
- Gaius Marius Victorinus (4th century AD) Roman philosopher
- Marcus Aurelius Marius, (d. AD 269), Gallic Emperor
- Marcus Marius (quaestor 76 BC) (fl. 76 BC), Roman quaestor and proquaestor
- Marcus Marius Gratidianus (d. 82 BC), Roman praetor
- Marius Maximus (fl. early 3rd century AD), Roman senator and biographer of Emperors

=== Given name ===
- Marius Aiyenero (born 2008), Canadian soccer player
- Marius Ambrogi (1895–1971), French fighter pilot in both World Wars
- Marius Amundsen (born 1992), Norwegian footballer
- Marius Antonescu (born 1992), Romanian rugby union player
- Marius Bianchi (1823–1904), French politician
- Marius Billgobenson (born 1966), born Marius Billy, Swedish-Congolese musician, cultural ambassador, and human rights advocate
- Marius Borg Høiby (born 1997), first child of Queen Mette-Marit of Norway
- Marius Bourrelly (1820–1896), French poet and playwright
- Marius Brenciu (born 1973), Romanian operatic tenor
- Marius of Britain, legendary king of the Britons during the Roman occupation
- Marius Bunescu (1881–1971), Romanian painter
- Marius Cazeneuve (1839–1913), French stage magician
- Marius Clore (born 1955), British-American molecular biophysicist and structural biologist
- Marius Job Cohen, known as Job Cohen (born 1947), Dutch jurist and politician
- Marius Constant (1925–2004), French composer and conductor
- Marius Copil (born 1990), Romanian tennis player
- Marius Crainic (born 1973), Romanian mathematician
- Marius Langballe Dalin (born 1966), Norwegian politician
- Marius Ebbers (born 1978), German footballer
- Marius Gabriel (born 1954), South African author
- Marius Girard (1838-1906), French poet
- Marius Goring (1912–1998), English actor
- Marius Grigonis (born 1994), Lithuanian basketball player
- Marius Grout (1903–1946), French writer
- Marius Haas (born 1945), German journalist and diplomat
- Marius Hasdenteufel (1894–1918), French World War I flying ace
- Marius Jouveau (1878–1949), French poet
- Marius Kižys (born 1982), Lithuanian footballer
- Marius Könkkölä (born 2003), Finnish footballer
- Marius Louw (born 1964), South African author
- Marius Lăcătuş (born 1964), Romanian footballer
- Marius von Mayenburg (born 1972), German actor
- Marius Mercator (about 390–451), Latin Christian ecclesiastical
- Marius Mircu (1909–2008), Romanian journalist and memoirist
- Marius Mitrea (born 1982), Romanian–Italian rugby union referee
- Marius Müller-Westernhagen (born 1948), German musician and actor
- Marius Nasta (1890–1965), Romanian physician and scientist
- Marius Michel Pasha (1819-1907), French architect and lighthouse builder
- Marius Petipa (1819–1910), French-Russian ballet dancer and choreographer
- Marius Roustan (1870-1942), French politician.
- Marius Russo (1914–2005), American baseball player (pitcher)
- Marius Sestier (1861–1928), French cinematographer
- Marius Sheya, Namibian politician
- Marius Söderbäck (born 2004), Finnish footballer
- Marius Trésor (born 1950), French footballer
- Marius Tucă (born 1966), Romanian journalist and TV host presenter
- Marius Urzică (born 1975), Romanian gymnast
- Marius Yo (born 2000), Japanese–German singer

=== Surname ===
- Clinton Marius (1966–2020), South African performer and writer
- Richard Marius (1933–1999), American Reformation scholar
- Simon Marius or Simon Mayr (1573–1624), German astronomer
- Simon Marius or Simon Mayr (1763–1845), German composer

== Fictional characters ==
- Marius, a character in the book The Letter for the King
- Marius, a non-playable Mii opponent in the Wii series
- Marius, the narrator of Diablo II
- Marius Pontmercy, in Victor Hugo's novel Les Misérables
- Marius, protagonist of the novel Marius the Epicurean by Walter Pater
- Marius Von Hagen, one of the four male leads in the otome game Tears of Themis
- Marius Titus, the playable protagonist in the video game Ryse: Son of Rome
- Marius de Romanus, one of the legendary ancient vampires in Anne Rice's Vampire Chronicles

== See also ==
- Maria gens
- Mario (given name)
- Marius (disambiguation)
- Mariusz
