= Lunar lava tube =

Type of natural tunnel on the Moon

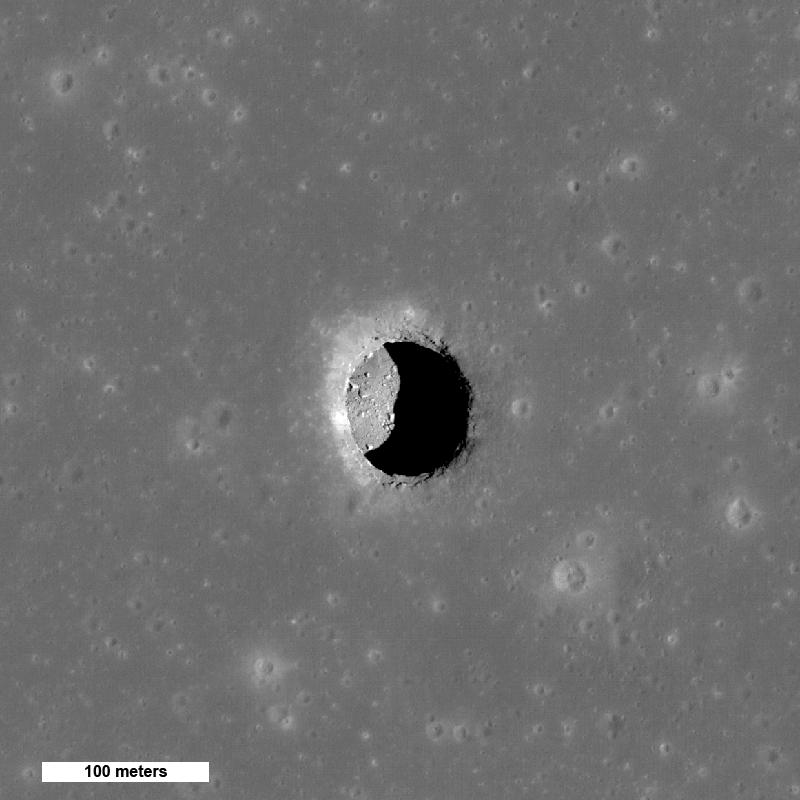
The Mare Tranquillitatis pit has been associated with a lava tube.

Lunar lava tubes are lava tubes on the Moon formed during the eruption of basaltic lava flows. When the surface of a lava flow cools, it hardens and the lava can channel beneath the surface in a tube-shaped passage. Once the flow of lava diminishes, the tube may drain, forming a hollow void. Lunar lava tubes are formed on sloped surfaces that range in angle from 0.4° to 6.5°. These tubes may be as wide as 500 metres (1,600 ft) before they become unstable against gravitational collapse. However, stable tubes may still be disrupted by seismic events or meteoroid bombardment.

The existence of a lava tube is sometimes revealed by the presence of a "skylight", a place in which the roof of the tube has collapsed, leaving a circular hole that can be observed by lunar orbiters.

== Observational evidence ==
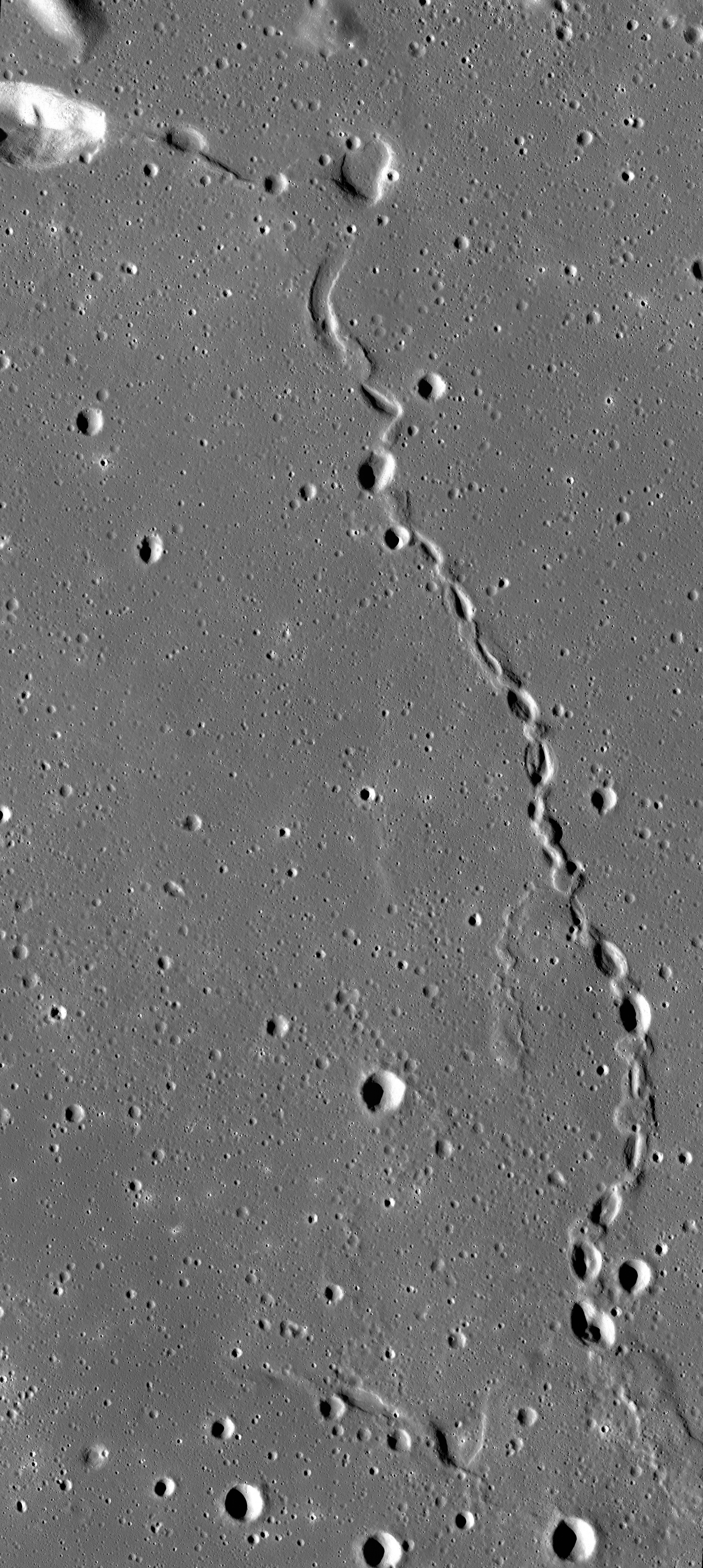
Sinuous 50‑km‑long chain of collapse pits transitions into a continuous uncollapsed segment of a lunar lava tube.

An area displaying a lava tube and rilles is the Marius Hills region (14°4′20.83″N 56°44′57.49″W). In 2008, an opening to a lava tube in this area may have been discovered by the Japanese Kaguya spacecraft. The skylight was photographed in more detail in 2011 by NASA's Lunar Reconnaissance Orbiter, showing both the 65-meter-wide pit and the floor of the pit about 36 meters below. Additionally, the Hadley Rille may have been a partly roofed lava channel, some parts of which have since collapsed. There may also be lava tubes in the Mare Serenitatis.

The Lunar Reconnaissance Orbiter has imaged over 200 pits that show the signature of being skylights into subsurface voids or caverns, ranging in diameter from about 5 m (16 ft) to more than 900 m (3,000 ft), although some of these are likely to be post-flow features rather than volcanic skylights.

The ISRO Chandrayaan-1 orbiter imaged a lunar rille formed by an ancient lunar lava flow with an uncollapsed segment indicating the likely presence of a lava tube near the lunar equator. The tunnel measures about 2 km (1.2 mi) in length and 360 m (1,180 ft) in width.

Gravitometric observations by the GRAIL spacecraft suggest the presence of lunar lava tubes with widths of over 1 km. Assuming a width-to-height ratio of 3:1, such a structure can remain stable with a ceiling that is 2 m (6.6 ft) thick.

In 2023-2024, radar imaging of the Mare Tranquillitatis pit from NASA's Lunar Reconnaissance Orbiter Camera was analyzed and determined to have been formed by the collapse of a lava tube that resulted in the formation of a cave conduit at least tens of meters long, proving the existence of lunar caves.

Lunar lava tubes have gained increased scientific attention as potential sites for long‑term human habitation. A 2025 study in npj Space Exploration emphasized that subsurface cavities such as lava tubes offer natural protection from cosmic radiation, micrometeorite impacts, and extreme thermal fluctuations, making them strong candidates for future lunar bases along with future research. Researchers proposed using global ground‑penetrating radar to map these structures and identify stable interior voids suitable for habitation. The study also highlighted how thick basaltic overburden maintains thermally stable environments. These findings support ongoing planning within the Artemis program, which considers lava tubes promising locations for protected operational infrastructure.

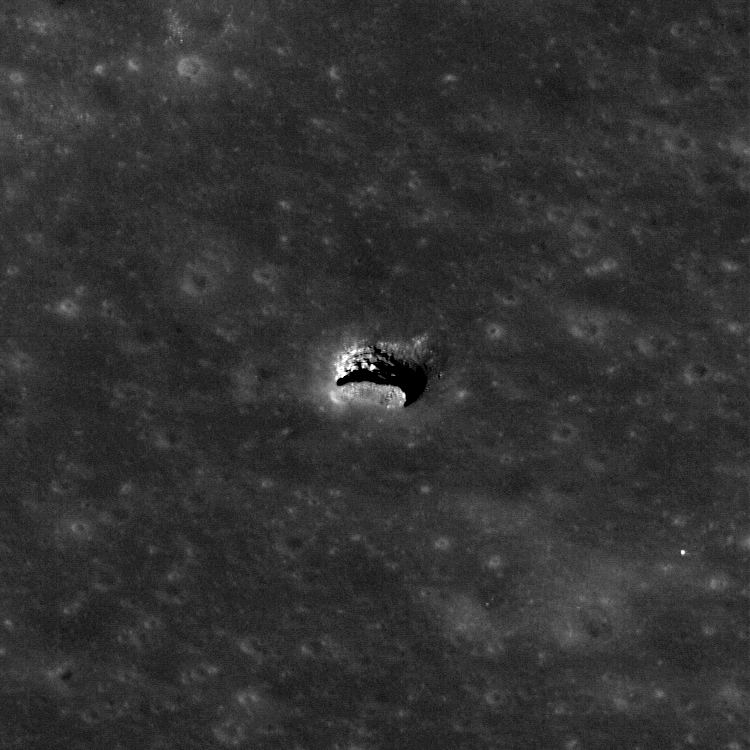
Oblique view of the Marius Hills "Haruyama Skylight" pit

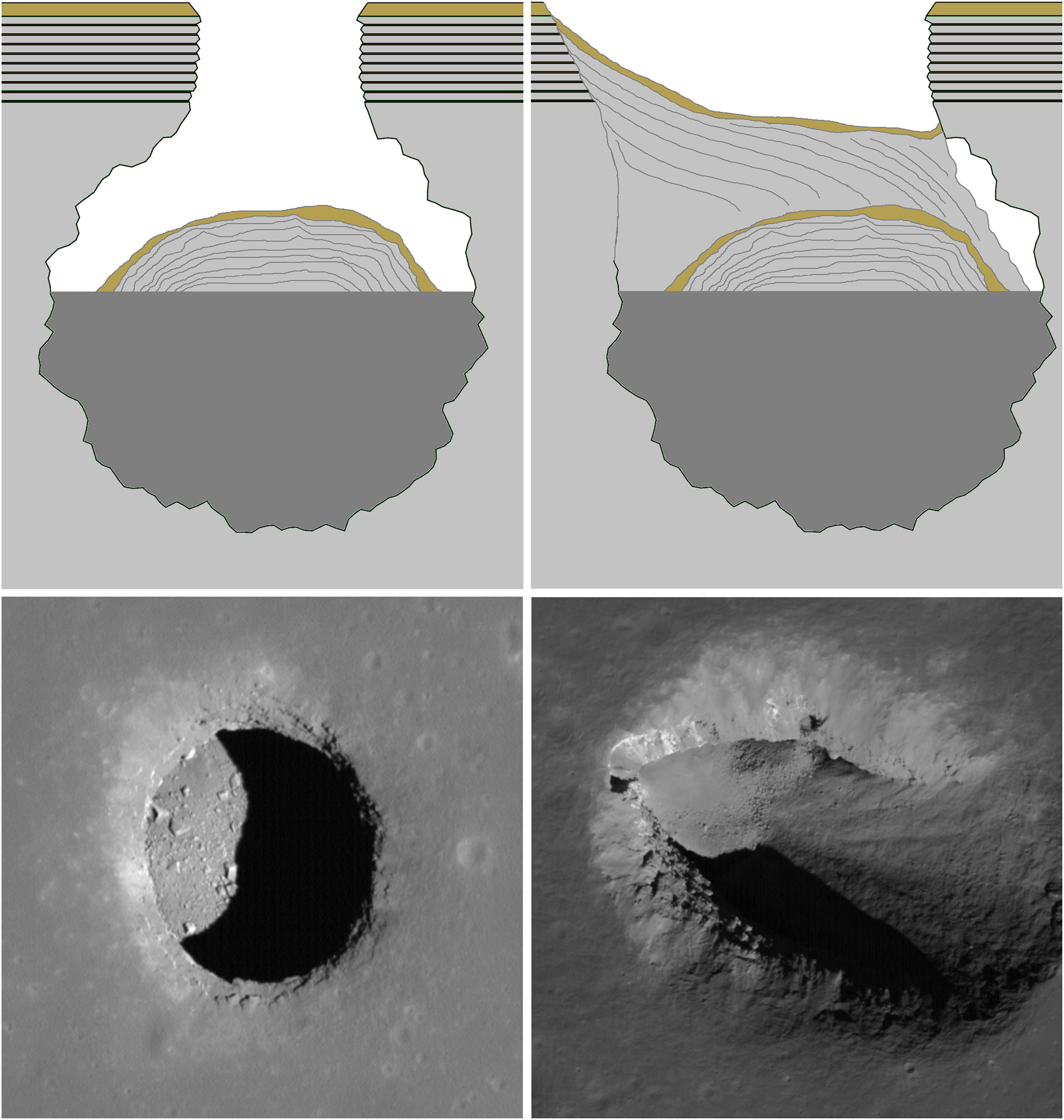
Possible post collapse geometry interpretations of stability analyses for half-filled lava tube.

== Proposed exploration ==
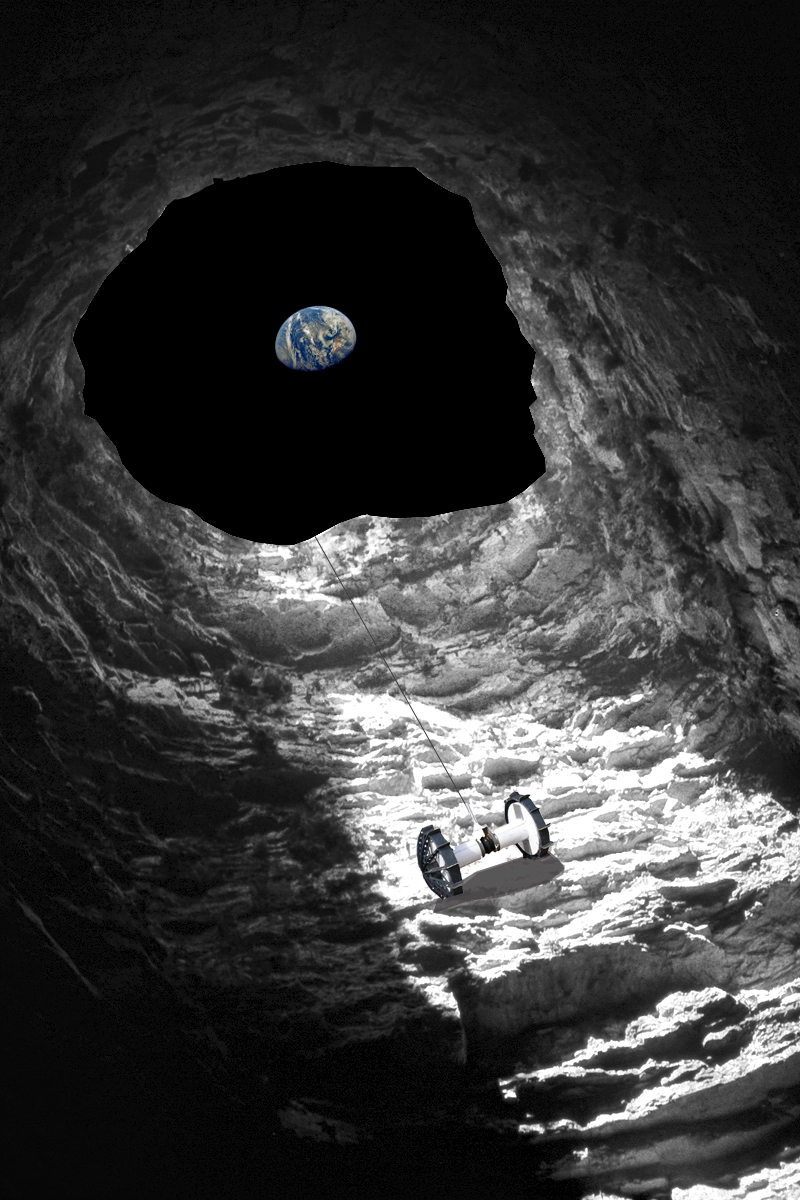
Rendering of the Moon Diver probe descending through the skylight of a lunar lava tube

Several groups have proposed robotic missions to explore lunar and Martian lava tubes.

The "Moon Diver" mission led by Laura Kerber proposes to send the two-wheeled AXEL extreme-terrain rover developed at NASA-JPL into a lunar pit in order to investigate the history of the lunar mare and flood basalt eruptions.

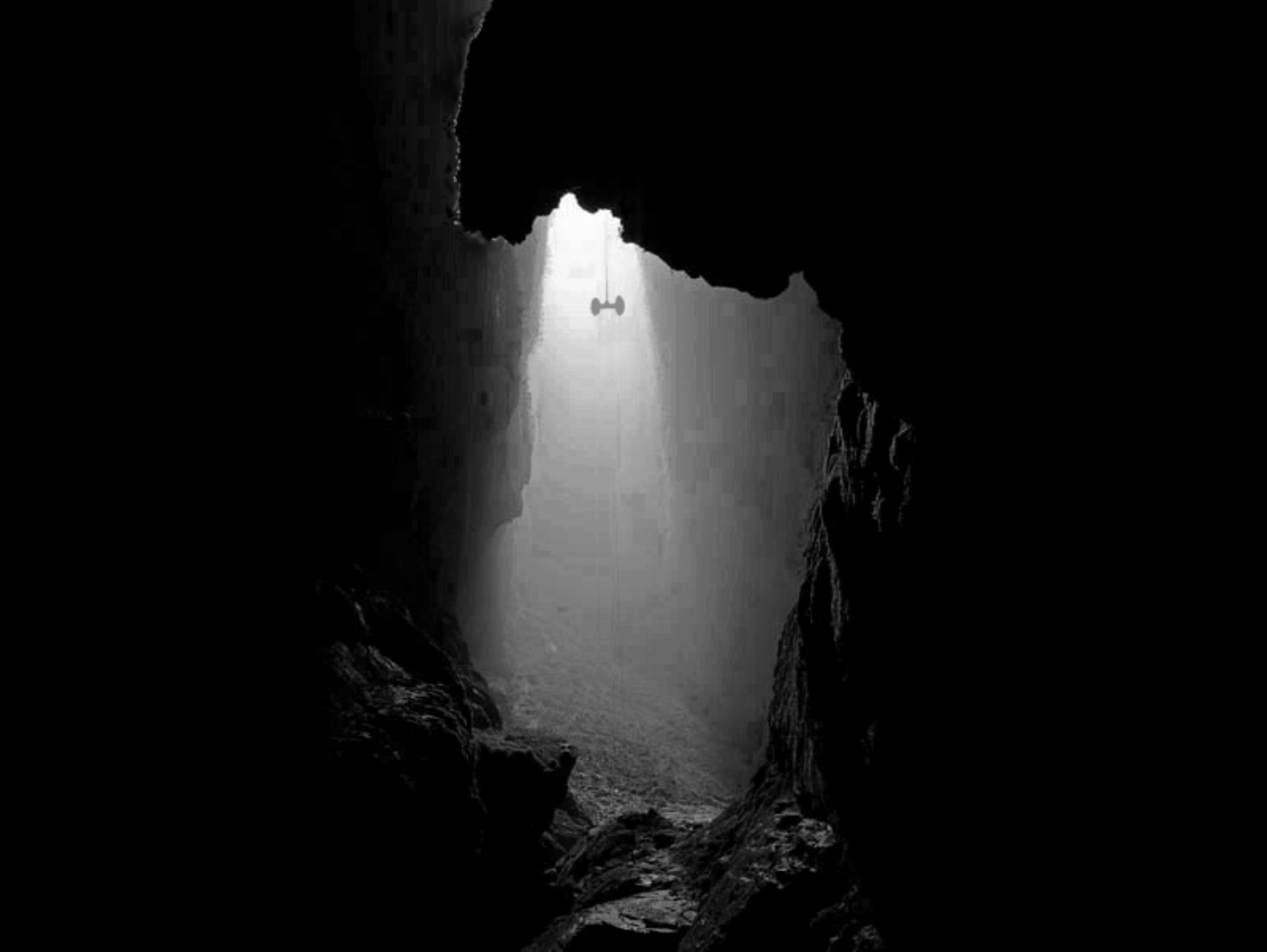
Rendering of the Moon Diver descending into a lunar lava tube

In 2019, the European Space Agency launched a campaign through the ESA's Open Space Innovation Platform (OSIP) to evaluate innovative proposals aimed at the exploration, documentation and 3D mapping of volcanic cavities on the Moon. Two complementary studies have been selected, the Descent And Exploration in Deep Autonomy of Lava Underground Structures (DAEDALUS) Sphere and the RoboCrane. DAEDALUS is a prototype designed by the University of Wurzburg (Germany), the Jacobs University (Germany), the University of Padua (Italy), the INAF-Osservatorio di Padova (Italy) and the VIGEA-Virtual Geographic Agency (Italy). This prototype is equipped with several components capable of performing a high-definition 3D mapping during the descent and moving autonomously within a lava tube. This system is in fact equipped with LIDAR and stereoscopic cameras to guarantee almost total coverage in order to acquire data in any condition.

== Possible sites of extraterrestrial life ==
Lunar lava tubes have been proposed as potential sites for astrobiological investigations because their subsurface environments could preserve organic compounds or even ancient life protected from ultraviolet radiation, cosmic rays, and extreme surface conditions.

== Sites for human habitats ==
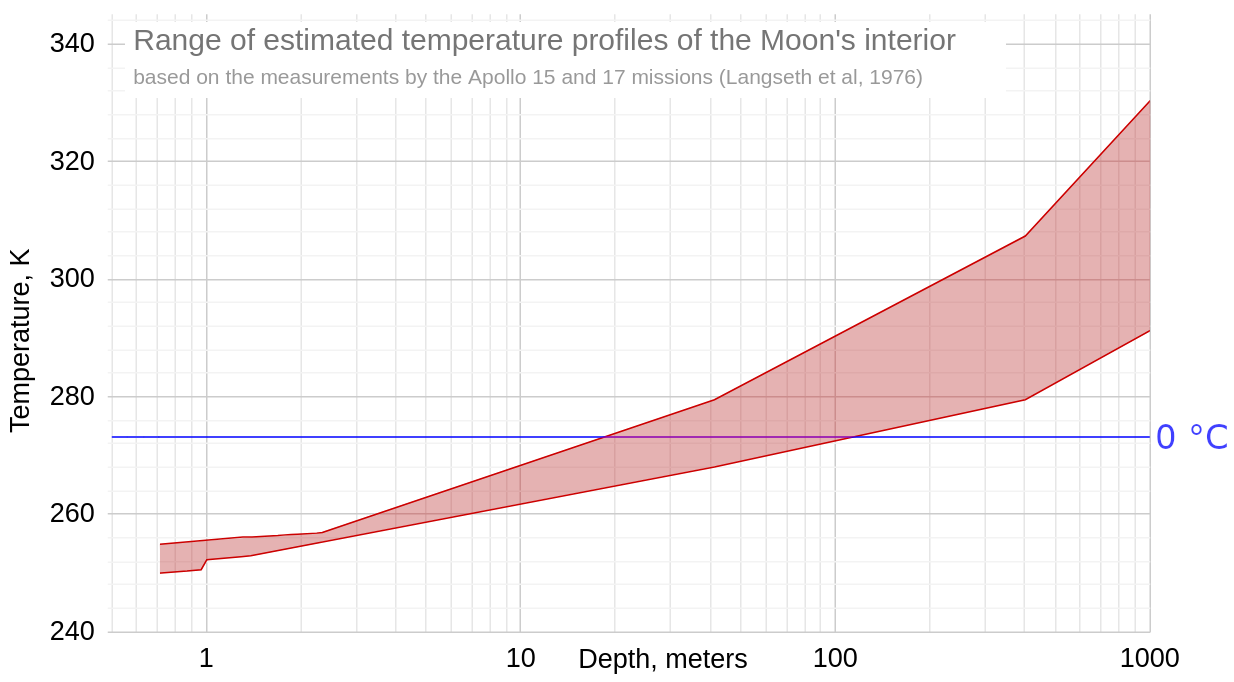
The temperature of the Moon's interior increases with depth

Lunar lava tubes may potentially serve as enclosures for human habitats. Tunnels larger than 300 metres (980 ft) in diameter may exist, lying under 40 metres (130 ft) or more of basalt, with a stable temperature of 17 °C (63 °F). These natural tunnels provide protection from cosmic radiation, solar radiation, meteorites, micrometeorites, and ejecta from impacts. They are insulated from the extreme temperature variations on the lunar surface and could provide a stable environment for inhabitants.

Lava tubes with a persistent temperature below freezing could act as a cold trap for water molecules, although any such spelean ice is likely to sublimate over geologic time unless the temperature is below 120 K. This is only likely in lava tubes near the lunar polar regions.

Lunar lava tubes are typically found along the boundaries between lunar mares and highland regions. This would give ready access to: elevated regions, for communications; basaltic plains, for landing sites and regolith harvesting; and underground mineral resources.

== See also ==
- List of lunar pits
- Volcanism on the Moon
- Martian lava tube
- Rille
