= Bourrelly =

Bourrelly is a surname. Notable people with the surname include:

- Henri Marius Bourrelly (1905–1991), known by his stage name of Rellys, French actor
- Marius Bourrelly (1820–1896), French poet and playwright who wrote in Provençal
- Pierre Bourrelly, French phycologist
