= Mariusz =

Mariusz is a Slavic-language masculine name, and may refer to:

- Mariusz Czerkawski (b. 1972), Polish ice hockey player
- Mariusz Duda (b. 1975), Polish musician
- Mariusz Fyrstenberg (b. 1980), Polish tennis player
- Mariusz Jędra (b. 1973), Polish retired male weightlifter
- Mariusz Jop (b. 1978), Polish professional football manager and former player
- Mariusz Kamiński (b. 1965), Polish politician
- Mariusz Klimczyk (b. 1956), Polish former pole vaulter
- Mariusz Kukiełka (b. 1976), Polish former professional footballer
- Mariusz Kwiecień (b. 1972), Polish opera singer
- Mariusz Lewandowski (b. 1979), Polish professional football manager and former player
- Mariusz Liberda (b. 1976), Polish footballer
- Mariusz Linke (1969–2022), first Polish born black belt in Brazilian Jiu-Jitsu
- Mariusz Maszkiewicz (b. 1959), Polish diplomat; ambassador to Belarus and Georgia
- Mariusz Niedbała (b. 1982), Polish former professional footballer
- Mariusz Pawełek (b. 1981), Polish footballer
- Mariusz Podkościelny (b. 1968), Polish former freestyle swimmer
- Mariusz Pudzianowski (b. 1977), five-time World's Strongest Man
- Mariusz Sacha (b. 1987), Polish footballer
- Mariusz Siembida (b. 1975), Polish swimmer
- Mariusz Siudek (b. 1972), Polish retired pair skater
- Mariusz Zganiacz (b. 1984), Polish footballer
- Mariusz Wach (b. 1979), Polish professional boxer
- Mariusz Wodzicki, Polish mathematician

See also Marius (name)
