= Marios =

Marios is a given name. Notable people with the name include:

- Marios Agathokleous (born 1974), retired Cypriot football striker
- Marios Batis (born 1980), Greek professional basketball player
- Marios Chakkas (Greek: Μάριος Χάκκας; 1931-1972), Greek author
- Marios Demetriades (Greek: Μάριος Δημητριάδης; born 1971), Cypriot politician
- Marios Demetriou (born 1992, Greek: Μάριος Δημητρίου), professional football player
- Marios Elia (born 1979), Cypriot professional footballer
- Marios Garoyian (Greek: Μάριος Καρογιάν; Armenian: Մարիոս Կարոյեան; born 1961), Cypriot-Armenian politician
- Marios Georgiou (gymnast) (born 1997), Cypriot gymnast
- Marios Giourdas (born 1973), Greek volleyball player
- Marios Grapsas (born 1998), Greek individual trampolinist
- Marios Hadjiandreou (Greek: Μάριος Χατζηανδρέου; born 1962), Cypriot triple jumper
- Marios Ilia (footballer) (born 1996), Cypriot footballer
- Marios Iliopoulos, several people
- Marios Kapotsis (Greek: Μάριος Καπότσης; born 1991), Greek water polo player
- Marios Karas (born 1974), retired Cypriot football defender
- Marios Kyriazis (Greek: Μάριος Κυριαζής; born 1956), medical doctor and gerontologist
- Marios Lekkas (Greek: Μάριος Λέκκας; born 1979), Greek male model
- Marios Leousis (1936–2011), Greek magician, appeared in several post-war cabarets and toured through Europe
- Marios Loizides (1928–1988), Greek visual artist.
- Marios Louka (Greek: Μάριος Λουκά; born 1982), Cypriot footballer
- Marios Matalon (Greek: Μάριος Ματαλών; born 1989), Greek basketball player
- Marios Matsakis (born 1954), Cypriot politician and former Member of the European Parliament
- Marios Nicolaou (Greek: Μάριος Νικολάου; born 1983), Cypriot footballer
- Marios Oikonomou (Greek: Μάριος Οικονόμου; 1992–2026), Greek professional footballer
- Marios Pechlivanis (Greek: Μάριος Πεχλιβάνης; born 1995), Cypriot footballer
- Marios Siampanis (Greek: Μάριος Σιαμπάνης; born 1999), Greek footballer
- Marios Stylianou (born 1993), Cypriot international footballer
- Marios Tokas (Greek: Μάριος Τόκας; 1954–2008), Cypriot composer of traditional music
- Marios Varvoglis (Greek: Μάριος Βάρβογλης; 1885–1967), Greek composer
- Marios Vrousai (Greek: Μάριος Βρουσάι; born 1998), Greek footballer

== See also ==
- Maria (name)
- Mario (name)
- Marius (name)
