= Moon Diver (spacecraft) =

Proposed lunar mission concept

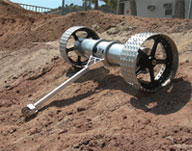
- Axel rover prototype
- Mission type: Reconnaissance
- Operator: NASA
- Mission duration: one lunar day (≈14 Earth days)

Spacecraft properties
- Spacecraft type: Lander and rover
- Dimensions: rover: 1.5 m × 0.9 m

Start of mission
- Launch date: Proposed: 2025

Moon lander
- Spacecraft component: Lander
- Landing site: Mare Tranquillitatis

Moon rover
- Spacecraft component: Axel
- Landing site: Tranquillitatis Pit

Moon Diver is a proposed lunar mission concept by NASA's Jet Propulsion Laboratory that would employ a robotic lander and a – distant coaxial – two-wheeled rover called Axel to investigate the exposed geological layers on the walls of a deep lunar pit.

The mission was proposed in mid-2019 to NASA's Discovery Program to compete for funding and development. The finalists were announced in February 2020, and the Moon Diver was not selected.

== Overview ==
The Principal Investigator of Moon Diver is Laura Kerber at NASA's Jet Propulsion Laboratory. The mission concept aims to understand the formation and evolution of the Moon's secondary lava crust by exploring the vertical walls of a pit in Mare Tranquillitatis. The proposed pit is called Tranquillitatis Pit, with a 100 m (330 ft) diameter opening, and about 100 m (330 ft) deep.

Collecting information on the chemistry, mineralogy, and morphology of these intact bedrock layers would reveal where rocky crusts come from, how they are emplaced, and the process by which they are transformed into the regolith layer. By studying lunar lava, planetary scientists can work out whether the volcanic activity was robust enough to give the moon a Mars-like atmosphere in the distant past. These cavities expose fresh cuts of rock that are of particular interest to planetary geologists. Of additional interest, is the potential that the pit may be a collapsed section of a lunar lava tube.

The Axel rover conceptual design began in 1999 by a team led by Issa Nesnas at JPL in collaboration with Raymond Cipra at Purdue University, Murray Clark at Arkansas Tech University, and later joined by Joel Burdick of Caltech.

=== Operations ===
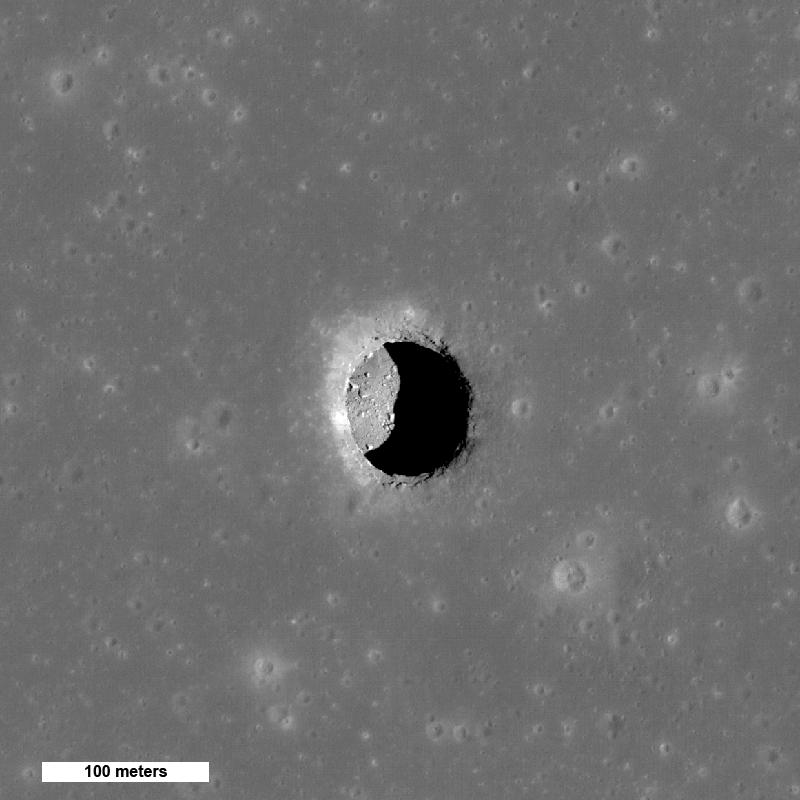
The mission's target is the Tranquillitatis Pit, about 100 m (330 ft) in diameter and about 100 m in depth. It may be a potential access to a lava tube.

The mission's lander would feature a highly accurate landing system, allowing the deployment of the rover a few hundred feet from the pit.

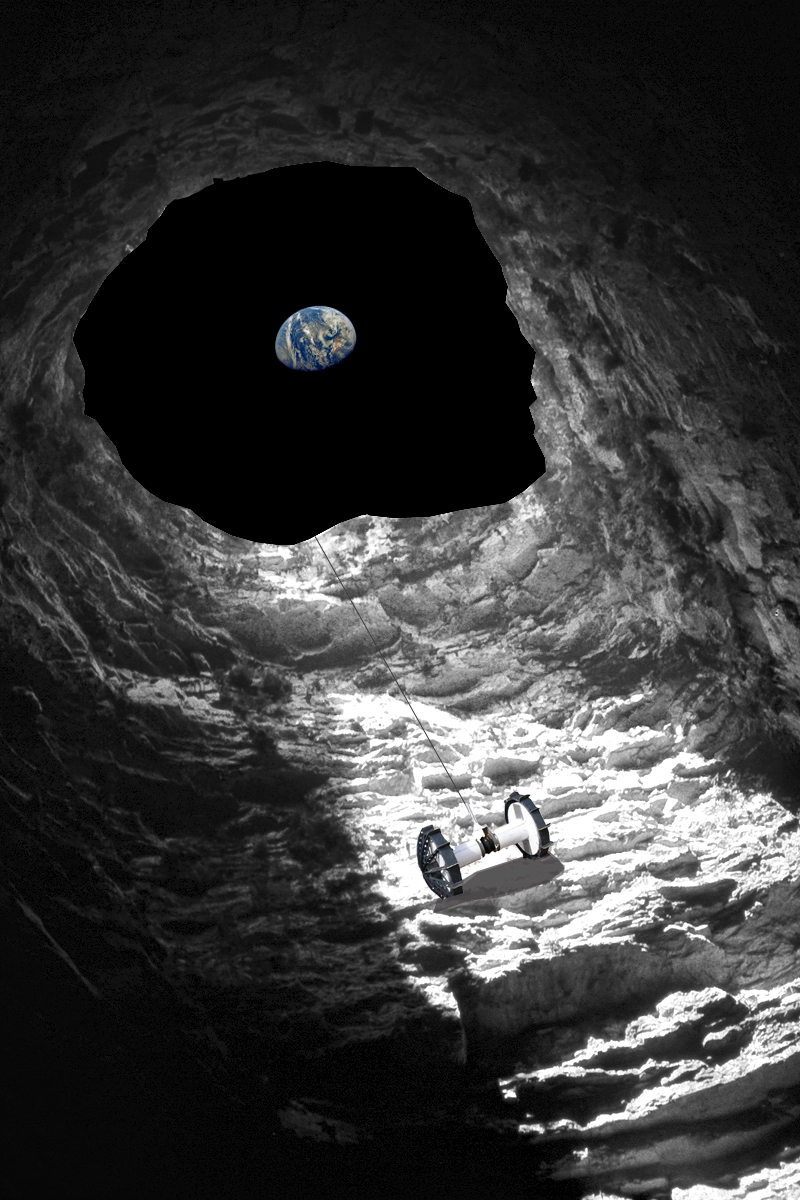
Rendering of the Moon Diver descending through the skylight of the lunar lava tube

The rover houses a winch on board, which pays out the tether as it rolls across the surface and rappels into the pit. The rover would carry up to 300 m (980 ft) of tether, about six times as much as it needs, so however far the bottom of the cavern is, Axel should be able to descend deeply enough. The lander provides mechanical support, power, and communication with the rover through its tether.

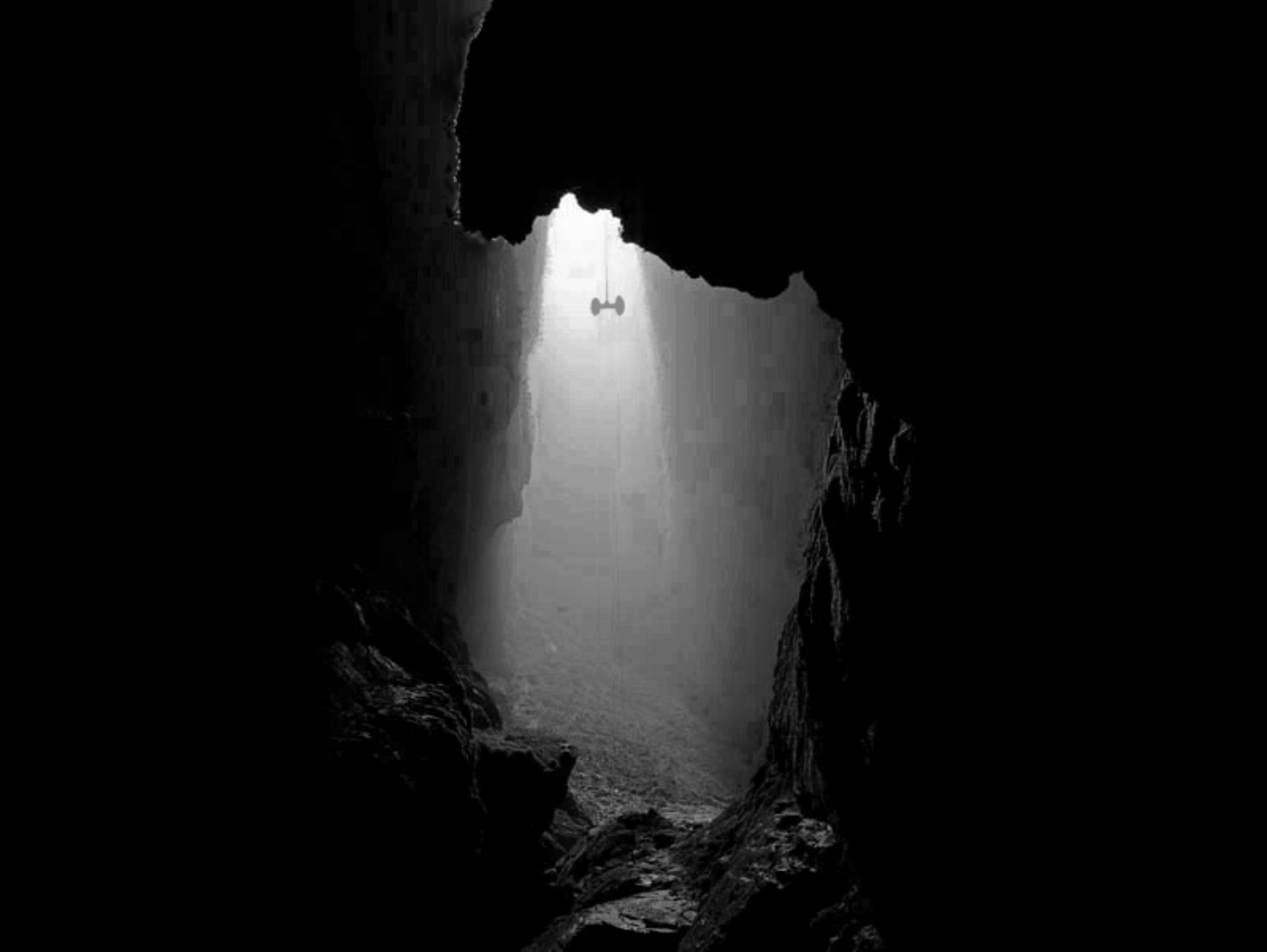
Rendering of the Moon Diver descending into the lunar lava tube

The instruments are housed inside Axel's wheel wells, where they are protected from the environment. The trailing link serves several purposes: it provides a reaction lever arm against wheel thrust, it adjusts the rover's pitch for pointing its stereo cameras, and it provides redundancy if one of the wheel actuators fails.

== Objectives ==
The Moon provides an especially useful example of secondary crust formation since it is one of the few places where resurfacing stopped before the primary crust was completely obscured by later events. The relative geological simplicity of the Moon means that the evidence of these processes can be preserved for billions of years.

The science goals are:

- Determine the extent to which the regolith is representative of the underlying bedrock.
- Determine the nature of the transition from regolith to bedrock.
- Determine whether the mare basalts were emplaced massively in turbulent flows, or if they were emplaced incrementally in smaller, but more numerous complex or inflated flows.
- Determine the composition(s) of the parental magmas of the exposed basalts and what they reveal about the magma source regions in the lunar interior.

Scientists are also interested in lunar lava tubes and caverns because they could provide shelter for future equipment or even crewed research centers. A pit or a cavern could provide shelter from radiation, micrometeorites, the harmful effects of lunar dust and the dramatic temperature swings between lunar night and day. The predicted constant temperature inside a lunar cave at the latitude of the Tranquillitatis pit is approximately −13 °C (9 °F).

== Science payload ==
The rover will carry at least three instruments in between the wheels – a coaxial distant pair, with space available for more. The instruments are able to rotate into position independently of the wheel position:

- Enhanced Engineering Camera (EECAM) is a trio of high-resolution cameras to capture the macroscale and microscale morphology and of the regolith and near and far pit walls with 20 megapixel color stereo images.
- An Alpha particle X-ray spectrometer (APXS, based on the Mars Science Laboratory mission) to measure the elemental composition of both regolith and lavas.
- Multispectral Microimager (MMI) to characterize grain, vesicle, and crystal size as well as capturing spatially resolved mineralogy. The rover also carries a surface preparation tool, which creates a fresh, flat surface for the instruments to examine when needed.

== See also ==
- List of missions to the Moon
- Lunar resources
- Lunar lava tube
