= Marios Iliopoulos =

Marios Iliopoulos is the name of:

- Marios Iliopoulos (musician) (born 1969), Greek guitarist and death metal musician
- Marios Iliopoulos (Greek businessman), Greek shipowner and president of AEK Athens F.C.
