= Marius Hills =

Volcanic domes on Earth's Moon

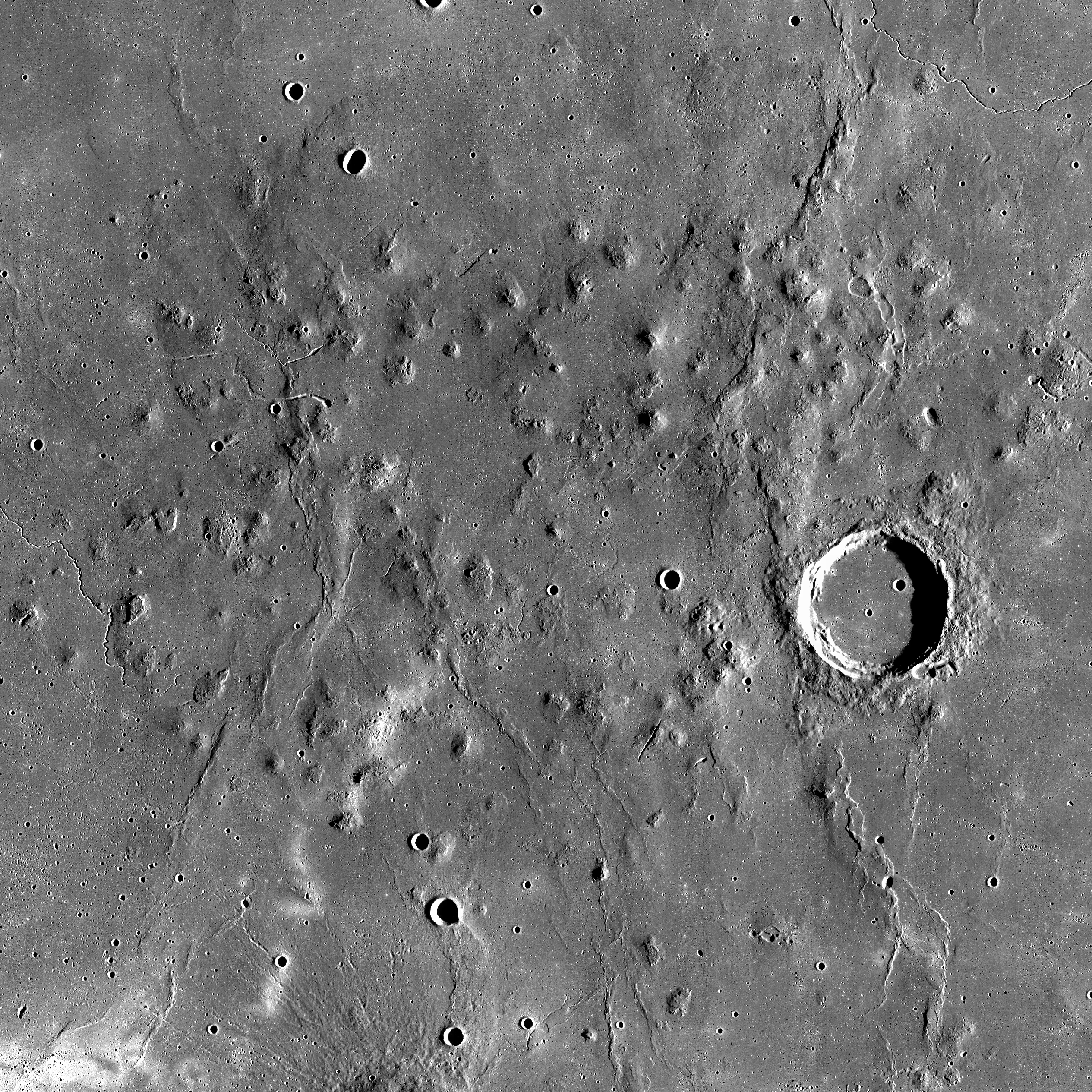
Overhead view of the Marius Hills taken by Lunar Reconnaissance Orbiter.

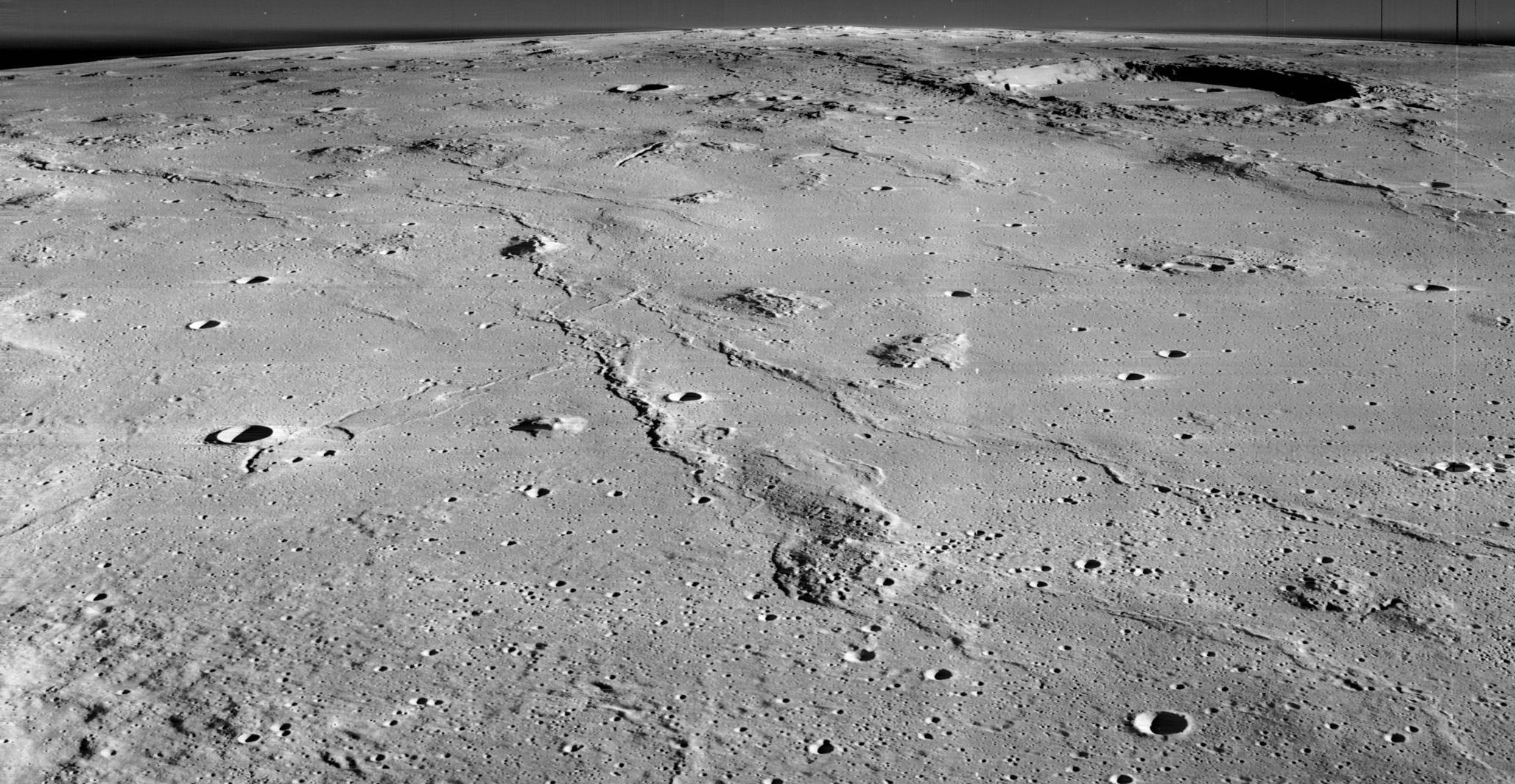
Oblique view of the eastern portion of the Marius Hills and Marius crater (upper right) by Lunar Orbiter 2

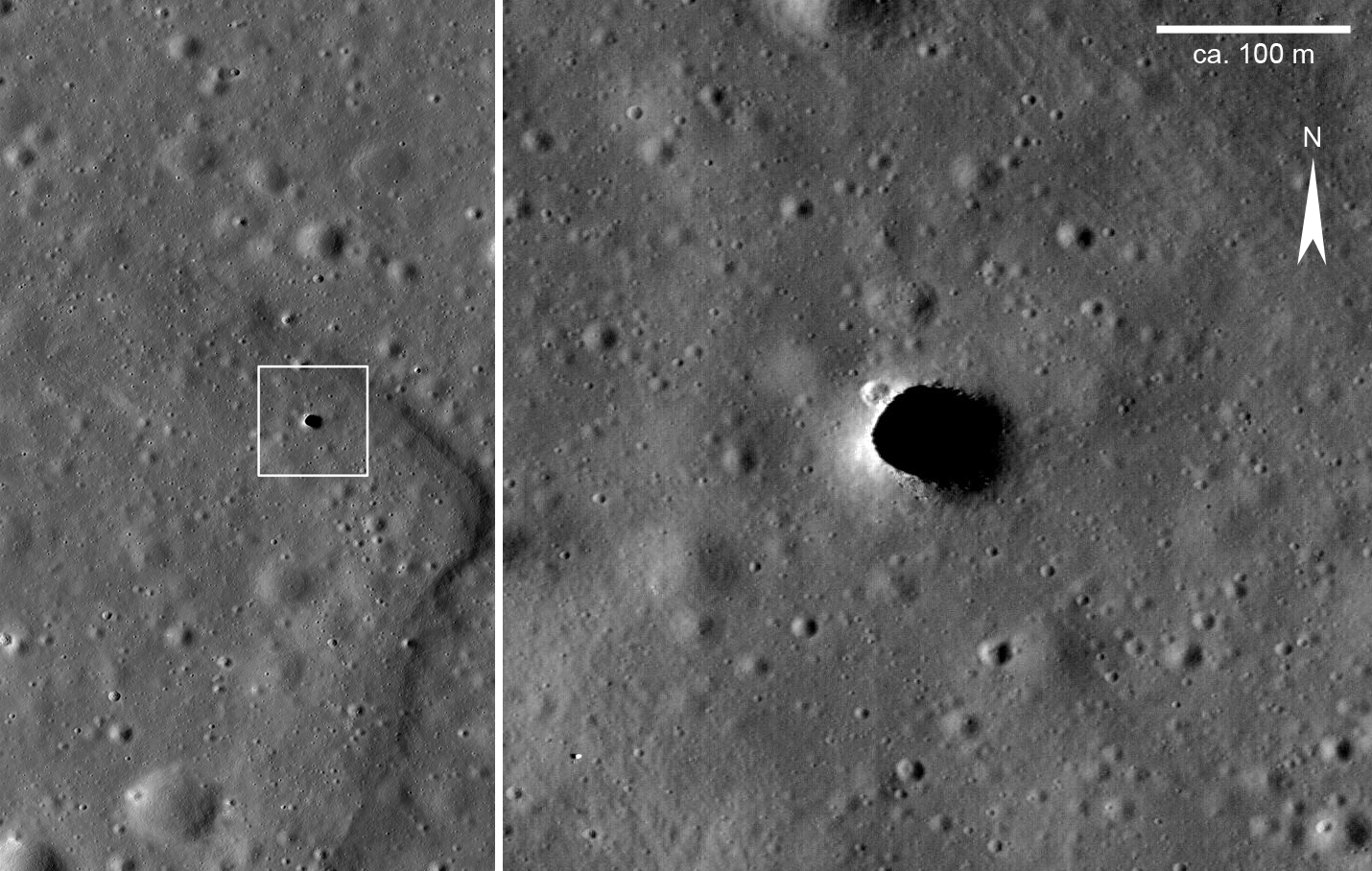
The "hole" in the Marius Hills

The Marius Hills are a set of volcanic domes located in Oceanus Procellarum on Earth's Moon. The domes are thought to have formed from lavas more viscous than those that formed lunar mares. These domes average approximately 200–500 m (660–1,640 ft) in height. The Marius Hills take their name from the nearby 41 km (25 mi) diameter crater Marius. These hills represent the highest concentration of volcanic features on the Moon.

== Geography and geology ==
An abundance of domes, cones, and volcanic rilles and channels is characteristic of the Marius Hills. The Lunar Reconnaissance Orbiter photographed a pit that could be a skylight in a lava tube, indicating that part of its roof has collapsed, as often happens after lava tubes cease to be active.

=== Domes ===
Data from the Lunar Reconnaissance Orbiter has been used to identify two different varieties of domes among the Marius Hills: (1) large, irregularly shaped domes and (2) smaller domes with steep sides and diameters of about 1–2 km (0.62–1.24 mi). Another feature, possibly pyroclastic, or primarily volcanic in composition, has a roughly circular shape and steep sides. Bright, high albedo boulders have been shown to be characteristic of lava flows in the Marius Hills. This suggests blocky lava with a high silica content formed these features. This hypothesis, however, is not supported by data obtained from the Clementine lunar orbiter. Analysis of lower albedo, or less reflective boulders suggest that many domes in the area may contain two layers of material: (1) an upper layer of thin, dark material covering (2) a layer of thick, bright material.

=== Marius Hills "Hole" ===
The hole, first discovered by the Japanese SELenological and ENgineering Explorer (SELENE) and then later imaged by the Lunar Reconnaissance Orbiter has been the subject of much research and speculation. There is a possibility that this feature could be a skylight in a lava tube. The depth of this hole is estimated to be between 80 and 88 m (262 and 289 ft) and its width is estimated to be several hundreds of meters. Additional radar echo patterns suggesting intact lava tubes have been found at several other locations around the Marius Hills, which correspond to areas of mass deficit in the GRAIL data.

== Exploration ==
=== Apollo program ===
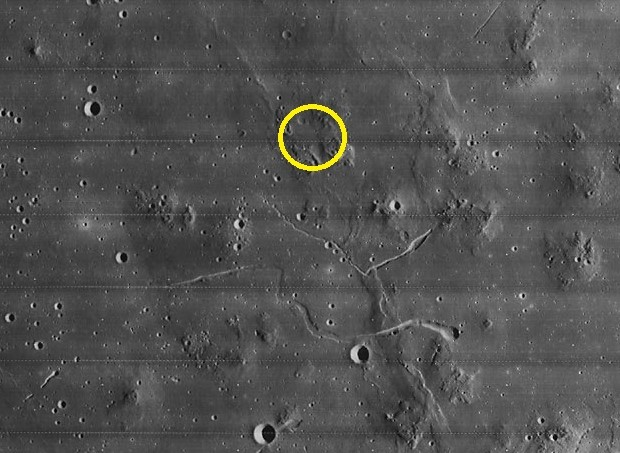
The Bellcom/USGS proposed landing site northwest of Marius crater (not shown) and north of two prominent, unnamed rilles in the region. This photo is an enlarged section of a Lunar Orbiter 4 photo of the region.

The Marius Hills region was at one time considered a possible landing site for a lunar landing mission during the American Apollo program (eventually becoming the alternative site for Apollo 15), with the possibility of gaining insight about the volcanic history of the Moon from domes in the area.

A site in the northern Marius Hills, located in the center of a five-kilometer circle in a shallow valley between four domes near a small sinuous depression, was one of nine potential Apollo landing sites studied in-depth as part of a 1968 Bellcom report describing the geology of those nine locations and potential mission plans. This site in particular, the Bellcom study suggested, could have offered the opportunity for up-close examination of planetary ridges similar to those located at the bottoms of Earth's oceans and sampling of a variety of material from the Moon's interior churned up during the area's highly active volcanic past. The Bellcom study referenced an earlier 1968 study, prepared by the United States Geological Survey, that outlined a detailed mission plan for the proposed site. This plan included four EVAs using a Lunar Roving Vehicle and Lunar Flying Units for increased mobility in sampling the various features in the site radius.

=== Potential human settlement ===
The probable lava tube could provide radiation shielding for a future underground lunar colony. However, it is unclear whether the tube is open or accessible. Two other lunar sites have been found by remote sensing, including on the far side's Mare Ingenii. An even larger, intact but buried lava tube estimated to be 1.7 km in length and 120m wide was detected by the Chandrayaan-1 orbiter.

== See also ==
- Volcanism on the Moon
