= Marius Billgobenson =

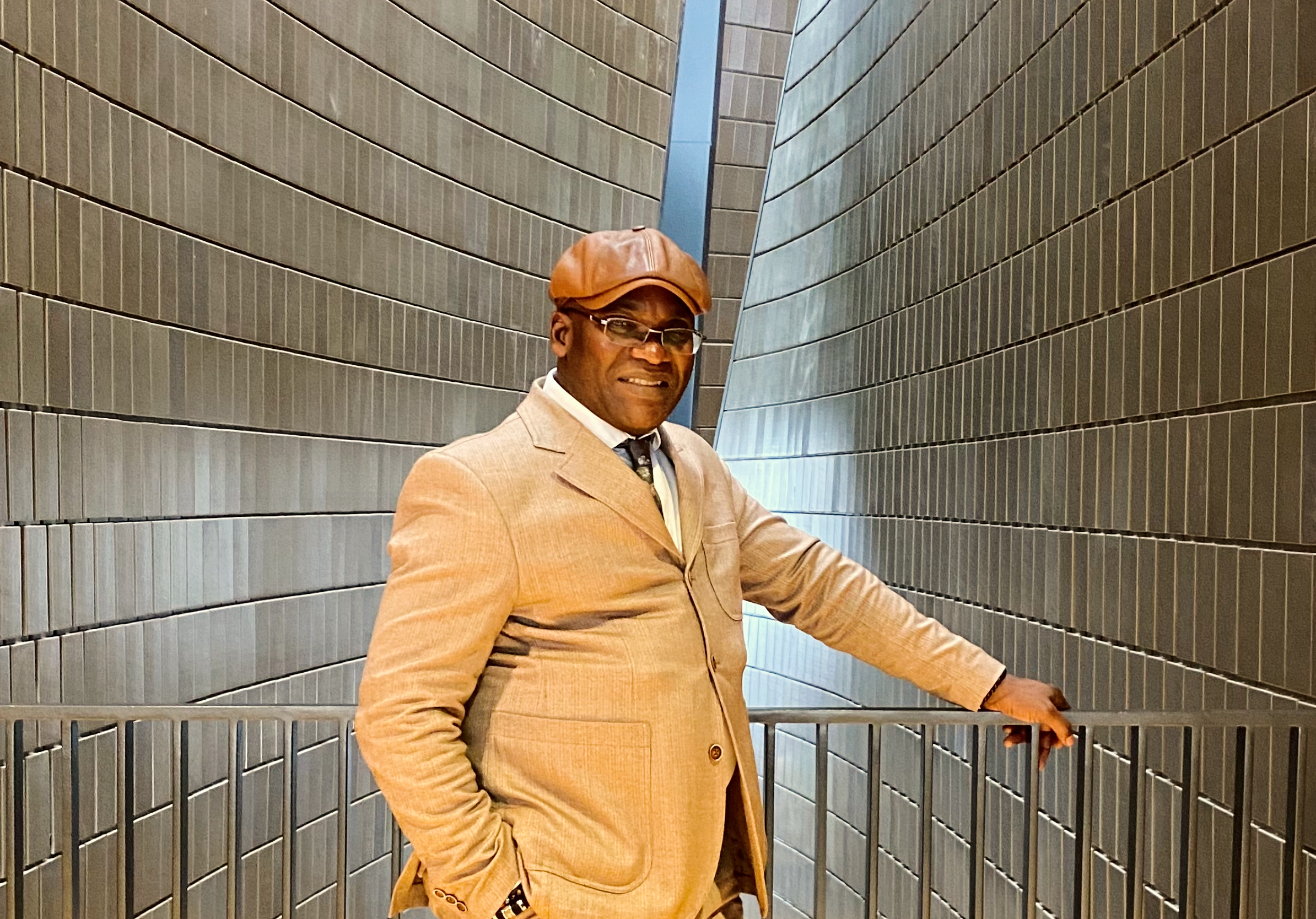

Background information
- Born: 4 April 1966 (age 60); Ingoumina, Republic of Congo
- Genres: Jazz, blues, pop, and R&B
- Occupations: Singer, songwriter, and guitarist
- Website: billgobenson.com

Marius Billgobenson (born Marius Billy, 4 April 1966) is a Swedish-Congolese musician, cultural ambassador, and human rights advocate.

== Biography ==
Billgobenson was born in a village in the Republic of Congo. His early exposure to the local culture, music, and the forest environment deeply influenced his artistic and cultural sensibilities. During the Civil War in Congo, he sought refuge among the Pygmies, also known as the "Forest People".

Billgobenson has worked with Afrique Profonde – Brazzaville, a non-governmental organization that promotes intercultural dialogue and education through the arts.

Billgobenson's music is a fusion of jazz, blues, pop, and R&B with indigenous rhythms. With his performances, Billgobenson aims to highlight marginalized communities' systemic issues and advocate for civil rights. He has performed and collaborated with others, such as Paul Brown and Chris "Big Dog" Davis.

Billgobenson earned recognition for his efforts from the UN Association for the Promotion of Human Rights in Congo (ACNU), the Congolese Art and Cultural Minister, the French Cultural Centre, and the Regional Cultural Minister in Pointe-Noire.
