= Mariusz Niedbała =

Polish footballer

Personal information
- Date of birth: 24 July 1982 (age 44)
- Place of birth: Milicz, Poland
- Height: 1.84 m (6 ft 1/2 in)
- Position: Midfielder

Senior career*
Years	Team	Apps	(Gls)
- Barycz Milicz
2000–2004	Warta Poznań		
2004–2005	KSZO Ostrowiec	13	(0)
2005–2006	Kania Gostyń		
2006–2008	Unia Janikowo	34	(0)
2007	→ Mieszko Gniezno (loan)		
2008–2009	Sandecja Nowy Sącz	3	(0)
2009–2010	Piast Kobylin		
2010	Calisia Kalisz	13	(2)
2010–2014	Piast Żmigród		
2014–2015	Barycz Sułów		
2015	Orla Jutrosin		
- * Club domestic league appearances and goals

Mariusz Niedbała (born 24 July 1982) is a Polish former professional footballer who played as a midfielder.
