= Marius (crater) =

Crater on the Moon

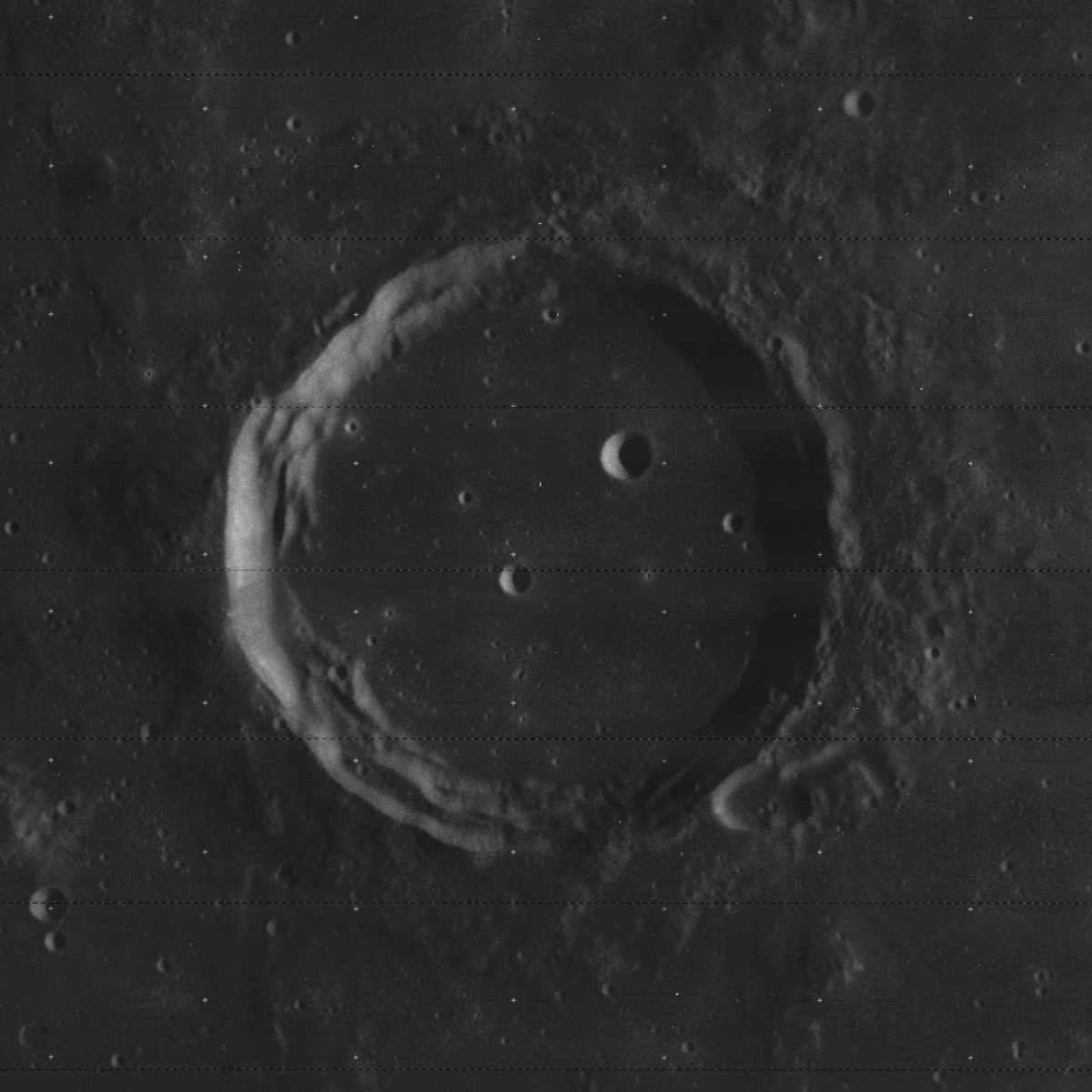
- Lunar Orbiter 4 image
- Coordinates: 11.9°N 50.8°W
- Diameter: 41 km
- Depth: 1.5 km
- Colongitude: 50° at sunrise
- Eponym: Simon Marius

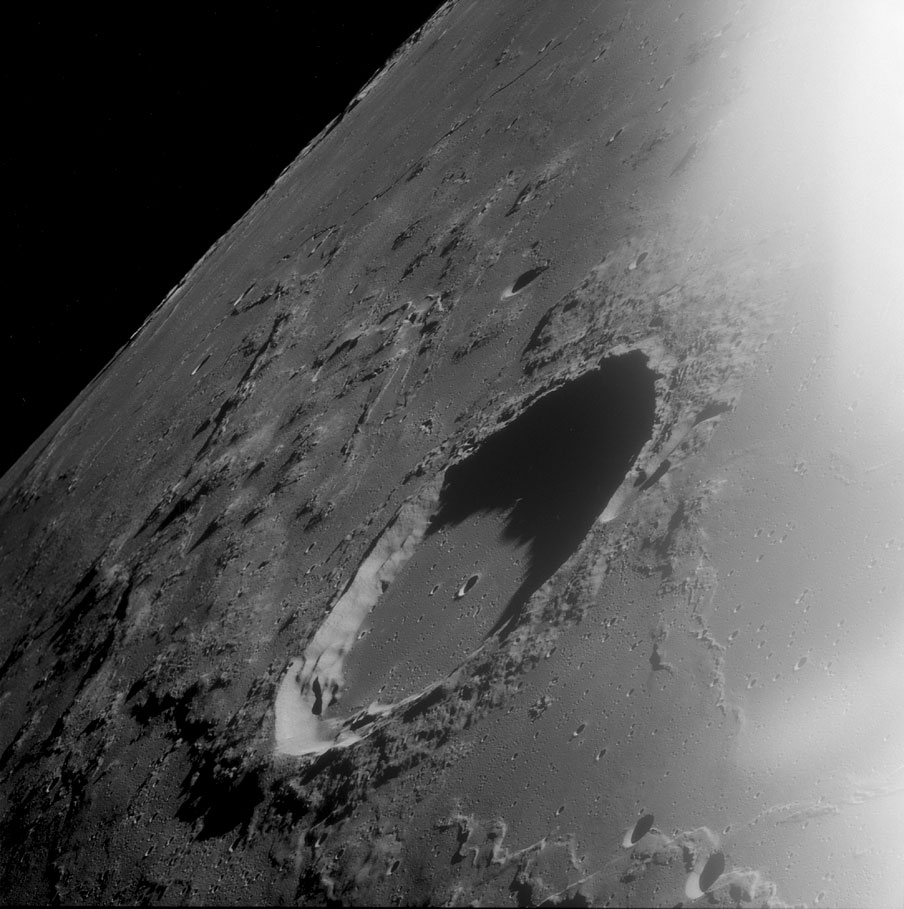
Apollo 12 photo

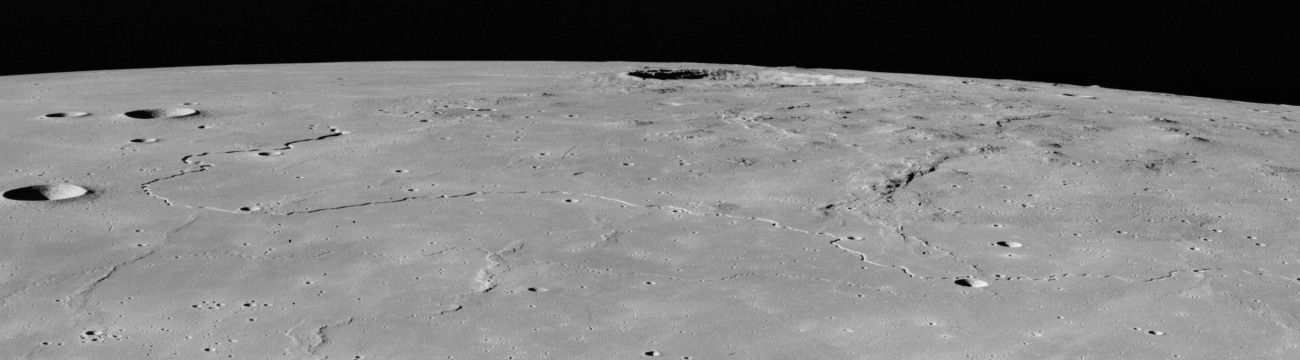
Rima Marius, with Marius crater itself at right, from Apollo 15

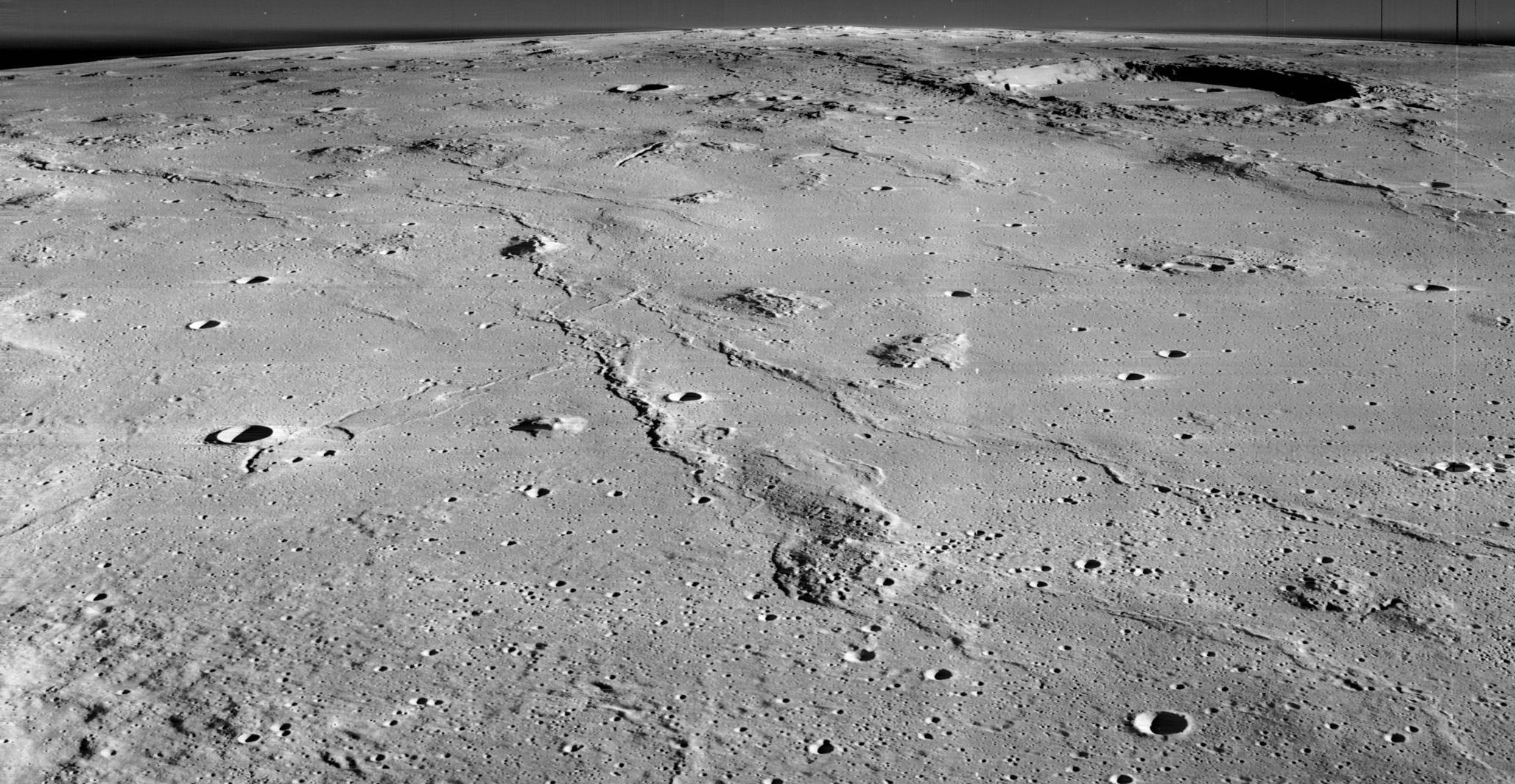
Oblique view of eastern Marius Hills with Marius Crater in upper right by Lunar Orbiter 2

Marius is a lunar impact crater located on the Oceanus Procellarum. The nearest named crater feature is Reiner to the southwest. Kepler is located to the east-southeast, and rays from that formation reach the rim of Marius.

This impact dates to the Imbrian epoch of the lunar geologic timescale. The floor of Marius has been flooded by basaltic lava, and the surface is relatively smooth and flat. There is no central rise, but a small craterlet Marius G lies in the northeast part of the floor. The crater rim is low and generally circular in form.

The surface to the west and north of this crater contains a large number of lunar domes spread across an area over a hundred kilometers in diameter that may be of volcanic origin dubbed the Marius Hills. These domes, if volcanic, may have been formed by magma that is fairly more viscous than the volcanic material that formed the basaltic lunar maria.

One of the numerous rilles in the crater's surrounding area has been found to host a probable cave skylight of a lava cave in 2009. Observations by the Japanese probe SELENE indicate the hole is about 90 meters deep, and the roof — the top part of the tube — is about 25 meters thick. This would be a likely location to consider moon colonization should the hole connect to a long enough section of ancient lava tube.

The area of this crater was one of the locations proposed for an Apollo mission, but the expedition was subsequently cancelled. About 50 kilometres to the southeast was the landing site of the Luna 7 probe.

== Satellite craters ==
By convention these features are identified on lunar maps by placing the letter on the side of the crater midpoint that is closest to Marius.

Marius	Latitude	Longitude	Diameter
A	12.6° N	46.0° W	15 km
B	16.3° N	47.3° W	12 km
C	14.0° N	47.6° W	11 km
D	11.4° N	45.0° W	9 km
E	12.1° N	52.7° W	6 km
F	12.1° N	45.3° W	6 km
G	12.1° N	50.6° W	3 km
H	11.3° N	50.3° W	5 km
J	10.5° N	46.9° W	3 km
K	9.4° N	50.6° W	4 km
L	15.9° N	55.7° W	8 km
M	17.4° N	54.9° W	6 km
N	18.7° N	54.7° W	4 km
P	17.9° N	51.3° W	4 km
Q	16.5° N	56.2° W	5 km
R	13.6° N	50.3° W	5 km
S	13.9° N	47.1° W	7 km
U	9.6° N	47.6° W	3 km
V	9.9° N	48.3° W	2 km
W	9.4° N	49.7° W	3 km
X	9.7° N	54.9° W	5 km
Y	9.8° N	50.7° W	2 km

== Popular culture ==
- Within the Sega CD RPG Lunar: The Silver Star (and all subsequent remakes) there is a region called the Marius Zone, which is named after the Marius crater.
- Marius crater is the location of the Hotel Samsara in the 2027 video game Ontos.
