= Mare Tranquillitatis pit =

Lunar feature with first proven lunar cave

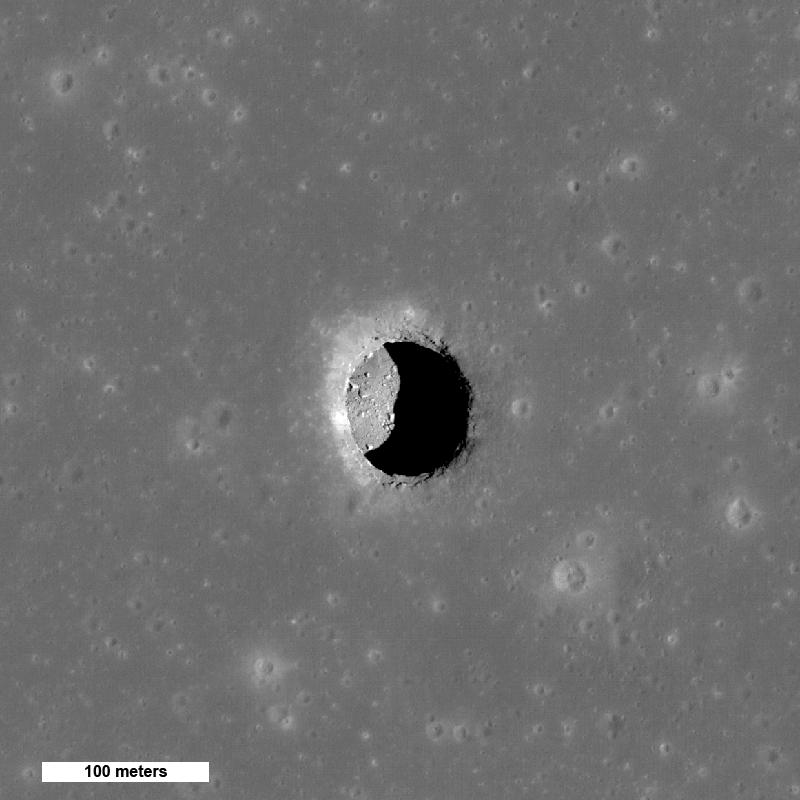
- Lunar Reconnaissance Orbiter Camera image
- Coordinates: 8.3355°N 33.222°E
- Diameter: Funnel: 140–146 meters Inner pit: 88–100 meters
- Depth: ~105 meters

The Mare Tranquillitatis pit is the name given to an elliptical opening on the Moon's surface in the Mare Tranquillitatis, situated roughly 400 kilometers (250 miles) away from the landing site of Apollo 11. The pit was created by a lunar lava tube, and is currently the deepest known lunar pit with a radius of at least 100 meters (328 feet). Radar imaging by the Lunar Reconnaissance Orbiter uncovered a potential opening at the base of the pit, a lunar feature that is notable for being the first lunar cave proven to exist beyond theoretical frameworks, and of being direct evidence of the existence of natural lunar shelter that could potentially be used as a lunar base.

== Description ==
The pit is located at 8.3355°N, 33.222°E on the moon's surface. Radar imaging indicated that the pit's funnel is roughly 20 meters deep, while the inner pit has a depth of approximately 105 meters. The diameter of the pit's funnel was between 140 and 146 meters long while the diameter of the inner pit is 88–100 meters long. The pit's walls were visible down to a depth of about 80 meters. Radar showed that a hollow space encompasses the entire circumference of the pit at a depth of roughly 40 meters below the lunar surface.

The pit floor beneath its eastern side slopes downward at an angle between 10° and 20° to a depth of at least 135 meters. The rest of the floor directly below the pit opening is flat and covered with boulders, including two boulders of 8–10 meters in size situated at the south-western section of the pit floor. The pit contains overhanging walls on the pit's northern, eastern, and western sides that extend no less than 10 to 15 meters outwards. Imaging did not indicate the presence of any significant features on the surface near the pit.

=== Cave system ===
Current radar studies analyzed that the Mare Tranquillitatis pit is an ellipse-shaped skylight. The studies noted that the pit floor appeared to extend underground beyond the opening by at least tens of meters, potentially indicting the presence of a cave conduit. Research of the cave based on radar data estimates that the size of the underground portion is no less than 130 feet (40 meters) wide extending to the western side. The pit was formed from a collapsed lava tube. Research has yet to determine if the pit's features are connected to other lunar pits.

== Research ==
The pit was first detected in 2009 by SELENE orbiter cameras. Radar studies conducted by an astronomical research team led by University of Trento professors Leonardo Carrer and Lorenzo Bruzzone and published on 15 June 2024 used radar imaging from the NASA Lunar Reconnaissance Orbiter to determine the shape and structures of the pit and features connected to it.

=== Potential moonbase site ===
The researchers noted that the additional underground space connected to the pit could make it a potential host of a future lunar base due to the cave's protection from prologued exposure to the surface's environment, including from solar radiation, cosmic ray exposure, and micrometeorite impacts. They also posited that it would be easier to set up and maintain a lunar base relative to constructing one on the surface, even while accounting for the need to maintain the walls of the conduit to prevent their collapse. The pit's lunar base could enable astronauts to conduct extended lunar missions.

A thermophysical model of the cave was constructed by a 2022 research team and compared with thermal emission data from the Diviner Lunar Radiometer. It was concluded that the pit remained about 100 K warmer than the surrounding surface at night and about 20 K cooler at day. The warmest pits were equatorial pits with regolith-covered floors, whose floors could reach over 420 K, but even in those, permanently shadowed areas of the cave remained about 290 K.

== See also ==
- List of lunar features
- Lunar lava tube

== Bibliography ==
- Horvath, Tyler; Hayne, Paul O.; Paige, David A. (2022-07-08). "Thermal and Illumination Environments of Lunar Pits and Caves: Models and Observations From the Diviner Lunar Radiometer Experiment". Geophysical Research Letters. 49 (14). doi:10.1029/2022GL099710. eISSN 1944-8007.
