= Mussel toxic peptide =

Marine biotoxin

Mussel toxic peptide (MTP) is a marine biotoxin that can be found in mussels of the species Mytilus edulis (blue mussel) that are contaminated by mycotoxins produced by fungi of the genus Trichoderma. MTP is a voltage-gated sodium channel blocker, which has a mild effect on voltage-gated potassium channels.

== Discovery and distribution ==
MTP was extracted from mussels harvested from Bizerte lagoon, located in the north of Tunisia. It was first discovered during investigation of the cause of a yearly repetitive food poisoning occurring after consumption of mussels from Bizerte lagoon during the autumn-winter season. During this season, changes in temperature and precipitation, which contains phosphates and nitrogen, contribute to conditions that are favourable for the growth of microorganisms that contaminate the siphon of the mussels. As with other marine biotoxins, it is difficult to track MTP’s origin but its occurrence has been increasing over the last decade due to changes in the local environment. This toxin found in mussels appears to contain two fractions, namely C17-sphinganine analog mycotoxin (C17-SAMT) and MTP. C17-SAMT has been found earlier in spoiled food and belongs to a family of toxins produced by fungi (sphinganine-analog mycotoxins). While the C17-SAMT fraction has been studied before., MTP was only investigated recently.

== Chemistry ==
=== Homology and family ===
MTP belongs to a wider group of marine biotoxins. Based on the clinical symptoms that they induce, marine biotoxins are distinguished in two groups: diarrhetic shellfish poisoning toxins and marine neurotoxic biotoxins. The grouping of marine biotoxins is also delineated based on their mechanism of action, where MTP is included into the channel-blocking neurotoxin family. As cases were not (at least not systematically) reported until the last decade, MTP might be a newly introduced toxin, coming from a species that was recently brought into the Bizerte lagoon.

=== Structure ===
Unlike most other marine neurotoxins, MTP is proteinaceous and has a molecular mass of 6.4kDa, which is large compared to the masses of other marine biotoxins. While its toxicity has been investigated, the exact structure of MTP remains unclear.

=== Target and mode of action ===
MTP blocks voltage-gated sodium channels, but has an almost negligible effect on potassium channels. In mouse neuroblastoma, the IC_{50} value was 4.5 μM for sodium and 102.1 μM for potassium channels, showing a much stronger affinity for sodium channels. MTP acts as a pore blocker on sodium channels.

=== Toxicity ===
Injection of MTP in mice caused symptoms of toxicity such as restlessness, breathing difficulties, paralysis of hind limbs and death in less than five minutes. Since a widespread chain of cases in humans has not been reported, its symptomatology has not yet been described.
