= Laura Kerber =

American planetary geologist at NASA

Laura Kerber is an American research scientist at NASA's Jet Propulsion Laboratory studying planetary geology. Her research has covered explosive volcanism, wind erosion in deserts, and extraterrestrial caves. Her work focuses mainly on Mercury, Mars, and the Moon. Kerber graduated from Pomona College in 2006 and holds two master's degrees, in Geology and Engineering (Fluid Mechanics), and a PhD in Geology from Brown University.

As of 2018, Kerber serves as Principal Investigator for NASA Discovery Program mission candidate Moon Diver, which proposes to send the JPL-developed Axel extreme terrain rover into one of several deep volcanic collapse pits on the moon, rappelling down the wall to expose the history of the lunar mare in order to illuminate the workings of the flood basalt eruptions that created them.

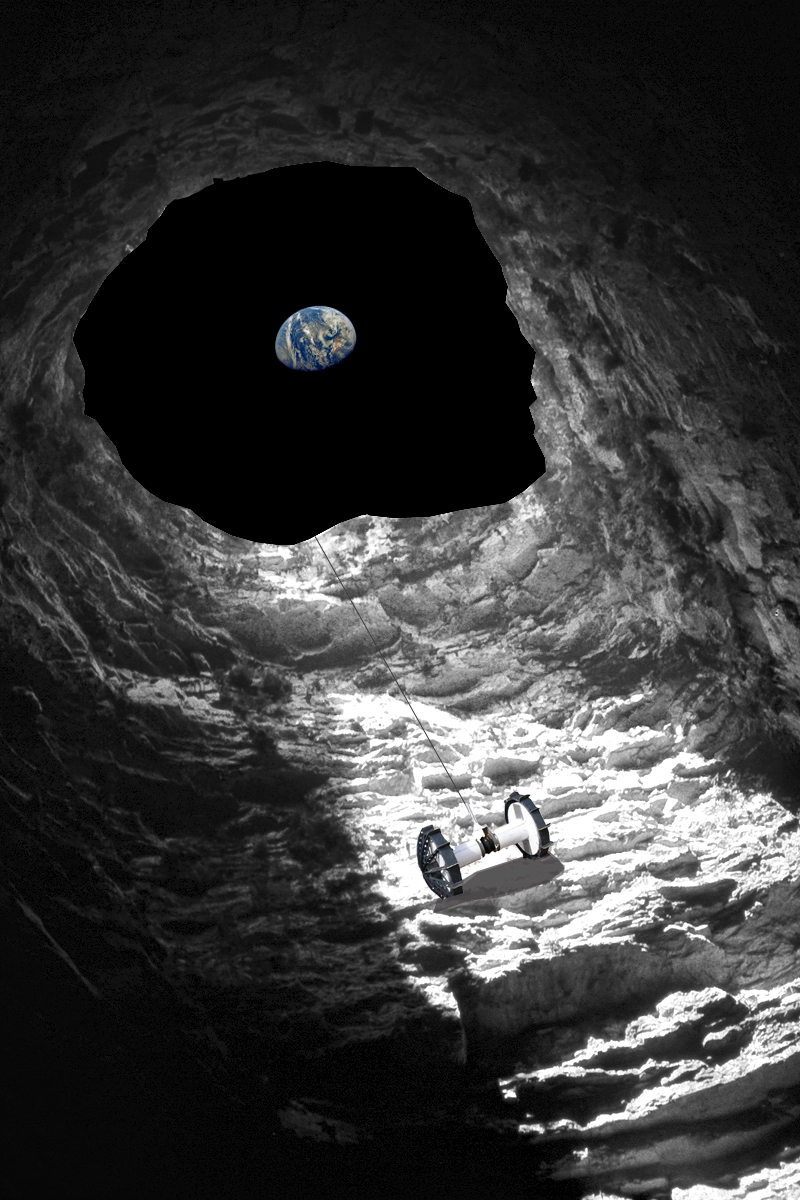
Rendering of the Moon Diver probe descending through the skylight of a lunar lava tube

Kerber also serves as Deputy Project Scientist on the 2001 Mars Odyssey orbiter, the longest-surviving continually active spacecraft in orbit around a planet other than Earth.

== Book ==
In 2025, Kerber was co-author of the second edition of the textbook Fundamentals of Physical Volcanology, along with Elisabeth Parfitt and Lionel Wilson.
