= Marius Bourrelly =

French poet and playwright

- Born: 1820; Aix-en-Provence, Bouches-du-Rhône, France
- Died: 1896 (aged 75–76); Aix-en-Provence, Bouches-du-Rhône, France
- Occupations: Poet, playwright

Marius Bourrelly (1820–1896) was a French poet and playwright who wrote in Provençal.

== Early life ==
Marius Bourrelly was born in 1820 in Aix-en-Provence, France.

== Career ==
Bourrelly wrote many poems, plays, legends and songs in Provençal. In a poem, he praised Emperor Napoleon for visiting Lyon shortly after the flood of 1856. He became a member of the Félibrige.

== Death and legacy ==
Bourrelly died in 1896. He bequeathed his personal library to the Bibliothèque Méjanes.

== Works ==
- Bourrelly, Marius (1842). La vido d'uno Gourrino, pouésio. Marseille: Chaix. OCLC 743070411.
- Bourrelly, Marius (1846). Leis désaviados. Marseille: Imprimerie L. Mossy. OCLC 742948315.
- Bourrelly, Marius (1849). Deux Godinho. Toulouse: Imprimerie de J. Dupin. OCLC 457121672.
- Bourrelly, Marius (1853). Leis cigalos. Marseille: Imprimerie de Arnaud. OCLC 490092631.
- Bourrelly, Marius (1856). La galino. Marseille: Imprimerie de Arnaud. OCLC 799138470.
- Bourrelly, Marius (1857). Fortuné Chailan. Marseille: Imprimerie de Arnaud. OCLC 457121674.
- Bourrelly, Marius (1857). Pierre Bellot. Marseille: Imprimerie de Arnaud. OCLC 457121687.
- Bourrelly, Marius (1857). La Garamaoudo. Marseille: Imprimerie de Arnaud. OCLC 457121677.
- Bourrelly, Marius (1859). Leis Coungrès. Marseille: Imprimerie de Arnaud. OCLC 457121671.
- Bourrelly, Marius (1879). La carreto dei chin. Ais: Empremarié Prouvençalo. OCLC 799138461.
- Bourrelly, Marius (1880). Tres galino pèr un gau. Ais: Empremarié prouvençalo. OCLC 464709096.
- Bourrelly, Marius (1894). Cigau e Cigalo. Ais-de-Prouvènço: J. Remondet-Aubin. OCLC 37658496.
- Bourrelly, Marius (1895). Lou vergié d'oulivié. Ais: Empr. J. Remondet-Aubin. OCLC 84057771.
