= List of people with given name Mary =

Mary is a feminine given name. Below is a list of notable individuals named Mary.

== Biblical figures ==
- New Testament people named Mary:
  - Mary, mother of Jesus
  - Mary Magdalene, a disciple of Jesus
  - Mary of Bethany, a follower of Jesus, considered by Western medieval tradition to be Mary Magdalene
  - Mary of Clopas, a follower of Jesus
  - Mary, mother of James the younger (or lesser)
  - Mary, mother of John Mark
  - Mary of Rome
  - Salome (disciple), a follower of Jesus, in medieval tradition Mary Salome

== Royalty ==
- Baroness Mary Vetsera (1871–1889), Austrian noblewoman; mistress of Rudolf, Crown Prince of Austria
- Lady Mary Butler (1689–1713), Irish-born English baroness; second daughter of the 2nd Duke of Ormonde
- Lady Mary Fitzwilliam (1845–1921), British aristocrat from the Fitzwilliam family
- Lady Mary Fox (1798–1864), British illegitimate daughter of King William IV of the United Kingdom by his mistress Dorothea Jordan
- Lady Mary Lygon (1910–1982), British aristocrat and Russian princess by marriage
- Mary Abercromby, 1st Baroness Abercromby (ca. 1752–1821), Scottish peeress, socialite, and wife of General Ralph Abercromby
- Mary Adelaide, several people
- Mary of Anjou, several people
- Mary Boleyn (c. 1499–1543), English sister of Queen Anne Boleyn
- Mary Brandon, several people
- Mary Bruce (c. 1282–1323), younger sister of Robert the Bruce, King of Scots
- Mary Bruce, Countess of Elgin (1778–1855), Scottish first wife of diplomat Thomas Bruce, 7th Earl of Elgin
- Mary Carew Pole (born 1936), British wife of Sir Richard Carew Pole, 13th Baronet
- Mary Curzon, several people
- Mary of Waltham (1344–1361), daughter of King Edward III of England and Philippa of Hainault; wife of John IV, Duke of Brittany
- Mary of Woodstock (1278–1332), daughter of King Edward I of England
- Mary I, several people
- Mary II, several people
- Mary de Bohun (c. 1369/1370–1394), first wife of Henry Bolingbroke, Earl of Northampton and Hereford; mother of Henry V of England
- Mary de Vere (c. 1554–1624), English noblewoman; daughter of John de Vere and Margery Golding, she married Peregrine Bertie
- Mary Elliot-Murray-Kynynmound, Countess of Minto (1858–1940), British aristocrat, Vicereine of India, and courtier to Queen Mary
- Mary Elphinstone, Lady Elphinstone (1883–1961), British aristocrat; elder sister of Queen Elizabeth The Queen Mother, and maternal aunt and godmother of Queen Elizabeth II
- Mary of Enghien (1367/1370–1446), Italian Countess of Lecce
- Mary Eristavi (1888–1986), Russian aristocrat, fashion icon, and model
- Mary Fiennes, Baroness Dacre (1524–1576), English daughter of George Neville, 5th Baron Bergavenny
- Mary Fleming (1542–fl. 1584), Scottish noblewoman; childhood companion and cousin of Mary, Queen of Scots
- Mary Foley-Berkeley, 17th Baroness Berkeley (1905–1992), British politician and peeress
- Mary Fox, Baroness Holland (1746–1778), British daughter of John FitzPatrick; wife of Stephen Fox, 2nd Baron Holland
- Mary Grey, several people
- Mary Karadja (1868–1943), Swedish princess, writer and spiritualist
- Mary of France, several people
- Mary of Great Britain, several people
- Mary of Guise (1515–1560), Queen consort of James V of Scotland and mother of Mary, Queen of Scots
- Mary of Hungary, several people
- Mary of Lancaster (c. 1320/1321–1362), English daughter of Henry, 3rd Earl of Lancaster and Maud Chaworth
- Mary Lilian Henriette Lucie Josephine Ghislaine Baels, birth name of Lilian, Princess of Réthy (1916–2002), second wife of King Leopold III of Belgium
- Mary Knowlton von Francken-Sierstorpff (1870–1929), American socialite who married a German Count
- Princess Mary of England (1605–1607), daughter of James VI and I
- Princess Mary, several people
- Mary, Princess Royal and Princess of Orange (1631–1660), daughter of Charles I of England
- Mary of England, several people
- Mary of Great Britain, several people
- Mary of Baux-Orange (?–1417), French Princess of Orange
- Mary of Scotland, several people
- Mary of Teck, several people
- Mary of York (1467–1482), daughter of King Edward IV of England and Elizabeth Woodville
- Mary Donaldson (born 1972), Queen consort of Frederik X of Denmark
- Mary Polly Paʻaʻāina (c. 1833–1853), Hawaiian chiefess; daughter of Henry Coleman Lewis and Fanny Kekelaokalani
- Mary Thicknesse-Touchet, 22nd Baroness Audley (1858–1942), English baroness
- Mary, Viscount of Béarn (?–after 1187), French ruler
- Queen Mary, several people

== Non-royal aristocrats ==
- Daisy, Princess of Pless (Mary Theresa Olivia; née Cornwallis-West; 1873–1943), Welsh princess
- Lady Mary Cecil Grey (1907–2002), English daughter of Charles Grey, 5th Earl Grey
- Lady Mary Child-Villiers (1877–1933), British daughter of Victor Child Villiers, 7th Earl of Jersey
- Lady Mary Clive (1907–2010), English writer and historian; daughter of the above
- Lady Mary Coke (1727–1811), English noblewoman
- Lady Mary Gilmour (1896–1984), English daughter of James Hamilton, 3rd Duke of Abercorn
- Lady Mary Grosvenor (1910–2000), British motor racing- and rally driver, businesswoman, and landowner; daughter of Hugh Grosvenor, 2nd Duke of Westminster and Constance Cornwallis-West
- Lady Mary Feilding (1823–1896), English aristocrat
- Lady Mary Maxwell, Scottish wife of Charles Stuart, 4th Earl of Traquair
- Lady Mary Somerset of Worcester, English daughter of nobleman and politician Charles Somerset, 1st Earl of Worcester
- Lady Mary Trefusis (1869–1927), English hymnwriter and courtier
- Mary Arabella Stewart, Countess of Galloway (1850–1903), Scottish wife of Alan Stewart, 10th Earl of Galloway
- Mary Bertie, Duchess of Ancaster and Kesteven (1730–1793), British courtier; second wife of Peregrine Bertie, 3rd Duke of Ancaster and Kesteven
- Mary Blacknall (1616–1650), English wife of Sir Ralph Verney, 1st Baronet, of Middle Claydon
- Mary Bonaparte (1870–1947), French princess
- Mary Bowes, Countess of Strathmore and Kinghorne (1749–1800), English daughter and heiress of Sir George Bowes
- Mary Boyle, Countess of Cork and Orrery (1746–1840), Anglo-Irish literary hostess
- Mary Butler, Duchess of Ormonde (1664–1733), British second wife of James Butler, 2nd Duke of Ormonde
- Mary Campbell, Countess of Argyll (1628–1668), Scottish wife of Archibald Campbell, 9th Earl of Argyll
- Mary Campbell, Countess of Breadalbane and Holland, English noblewoman
- Mary Caroline Blair (1848–1912), British Duchess
- Mary Cavendish, several people
- Mary Cecil, several people
- Mary Constance Wyndham (1862–1937), English society hostess and countess
- Mary, Countess of Blois (1200–1241), daughter of Walter of Avesnes and Margaret of Blois
- Mary, Countess of Falmouth and Dorset (1645–1679), English courtier and mistress of Charles II of England
- Mary, Countess of Harold (1701–1785), English aristocrat and philanthropist
- Mary Cowper (1685–1724), English countess, courtier, and diarist; wife of William Cowper, 1st Earl Cowper
- Mary Cromwell, Countess Fauconberg (1630s–1713), English noblewoman
- Mary Darcy (1565–1644), English baroness; wife of Thomas Darcy, 1st Earl Rivers
- Mary Darcy, Countess of Holderness (c. 1721–1801), English countess; wife of Robert Darcy, 4th Earl of Holderness
- Mary Dawson, Countess of Dartrey (1854–1939), British peer
- Mary de Monthermer (1297–c. 1371), English noblewoman
- Mary Drummond (1675–1729), Scottish countess; daughter of James Drummond, 4th Earl of Perth
- Mary Dudley, several people
- Mary Elliot-Murray-Kynynmound, Countess of Minto (1858–1940), British aristocrat
- Mary Fane, several people
- Mary Fenwick (?–1708), English wife of Sir John Fenwick, 3rd Baronet
- Mary Fiennes (lady-in-waiting) (1495–1531), English courtier; wife of Henry Norris
- Mary Fitton (1578–1647), Elizabethan gentlewoman; maid of honour to Queen Elizabeth I
- Mary FitzMaurice, 4th Countess of Orkney (1755–1831), Scottish peer; daughter of Murrough O'Brien, 1st Marquess of Thomond and Mary O'Brien, 3rd Countess of Orkney
- Mary Forbes, Countess of Granard (?–1797), Irish countess; wife of George Forbes, 3rd Earl of Granard
- Mary Fox-Strangways, Countess of Ilchester (1852–1935), Anglo-Irish noblewoman
- Mary Freeman-Grenville, 12th Lady Kinloss (1922–2012), British peer
- Mary Gargrave (1576–c. 1640), English courtier to Anne of Denmark
- Mary Goelet (1878–1937), American-born Scottish duchess, heiress, and socialite
- Mary Hamilton, several people
- Mary Harcourt, Viscountess Harcourt (1874–1961), American-born British aristocrat and philanthropist
- Mary Harmsworth, Viscountess Northcliffe (1867–1963), English wife of publisher Alfred Harmsworth, 1st Viscount Northcliffe
- Mary Hastings (c. 1552–c. 1589), English courtier; daughter of Francis Hastings, 2nd Earl of Huntingdon
- Mary Haughey, Baroness Ballyedmond (born 1947), Northern Irish billionaire heiress and businesswoman
- Mary Herbert, several people
- Mary Hervey (c. 1700–1768), English courtier
- Mary Hill, several people
- Mary Howard, several people
- Mary Hungerford (c. 1468–1530s), English daughter of Thomas Hungerford of Rowden
- Mary Innes-Ker, Duchess of Roxburghe (1915–2014), British aristocrat
- Mary Jane Brabazon, Countess of Meath (1847–1918), British philanthropist; daughter of Amelia, Countess of Lauderdale, and Thomas Maitland, 11th Earl of Lauderdale
- Mary Jenkinson, Countess of Liverpool (1777–1846), British wife of Robert Jenkinson, 2nd Earl of Liverpool
- Mary Jeune, Baroness St Helier (1845–1931), British politician; wife of Francis Jeune, 1st Baron St Helier
- Mary Louisa Bruce, Countess of Elgin (1819–1898), British aristocrat and writer
- Mary Montagu, several people
- Mary Mumford, 15th Lady Herries of Terregles (1940–2017), Scottish peeress
- Mary Nevill, several people
- Mary of Avesnes (1280–1354), French daughter of John II, Count of Holland and Philippa of Luxembourg; brother of William I, Count of Hainaut
- Mary of Bourbon (1515–1538), French daughter of Charles, Duke of Vendôme, and Françoise d'Alençon
- Mary of Guelders (c. 1434–1463), daughter of Arnold, Duke of Guelders
- Mary of Burgundy, several people
- Mary of Lusignan, several people
- Mary of Nassau-Siegen (1418–1472), German countess
- Mary of Nassau-Siegen (1491–1547), German countess
- Mary Osborne, Duchess of Leeds (1723–1764), British daughter of Henrietta Godolphin, née Churchill, 2nd Duchess of Marlborough, and Francis Godolphin, 2nd Earl of Godolphin
- Mary Palmer (born 1750) (1750–1820), Irish marchioness
- Mary Paulet (c. 1540–1592), English noblewoman
- Mary Paulet, Marchioness of Winchester (?–1680), English marchioness; wife of Charles Paulet, 6th Marquess of Winchester
- Mary Pelham, Countess of Chichester (1776–1862), English wife of Thomas Pelham, 2nd Earl of Chichester
- Mary Percy, several people
- Mary Pitt, Countess of Chatham (1762–1821), English noblewoman and political campaigner; wife of John Pitt, 2nd Earl of Chatham
- Mary Ravenscroft (?–1796), Scottish wife of Charles Stewart, 7th Earl of Traquair
- Mary Rich, Countess of Warwick (1625–1678), English countess and writer
- Mary Rosse (1813–1885), Anglo-Irish astronomer, architect, furniture designer, and photographer; wife of William Parsons, 3rd Earl of Rosse
- Mary Sackville (c. 1586–1645), English royal governess
- Mary Sackville, Countess of Dorset (1669–1691), English aristocrat; wife of poet and courtier Charles Sackville, 6th Earl of Dorset
- Mary Scott, 3rd Countess of Buccleuch (1647–1661), Scottish peer
- Mary Scrope (?–1548), English courtier
- Mary Scudamore (c. 1550–1603), English courtier to Elizabeth I
- Mary Seymour, several people
- Mary of Shaftesbury (?–1215/1216), English Roman Catholic abbess; daughter of Count Geoffrey V of Anjou and half-sister of King Henry II of England
- Mary Shirley, Countess Ferrers (1733–1807), English noblewoman
- Mary Sidney, several people
- Mary Somerset, several people
- Mary Stanley, Countess of Derby (1824–1900), English grande dame and political hostess
- Mary Stopford, Countess of Courtown, several people
- Mary Stuart, several people
- Mary Sturt, Baroness Alington (1902–1936), English socialite; daughter of Anthony Ashley-Cooper, 9th Earl of Shaftesbury and Lady Constance Sibell Grosvenor
- Mary Trevelyan (Lady) (1881–1966), English political hostess and voluntary worker
- Mary Villiers, Countess of Buckingham (c. 1570–1632), English countess; mother of George Villiers, 1st Duke of Buckingham
- Mary von Bothmer (1842–1901), English-German writer and aristocrat
- Mary von Rosen (1886–1967), Swedish Lutheran religious worker; wife of Count Eric von Rosen
- Mary von Waldersee (1837–1914), American-born German philanthropist; wife of Prince Frederick of Schleswig-Holstein-Sonderburg-Augustenburg and Count Alfred von Waldersee
- Mary Waldegrave, Countess Waldegrave (1850–1933), British peeress
- Mary Watson-Wentworth, Marchioness of Rockingham (1735–1804), English wife of Charles Watson-Wentworth, 2nd Marquess of Rockingham
- Mary Wood, Viscountess Halifax (1807–1884), English noblewoman
- Mary Woodhouse (?–1656), English daughter of Henry Woodhouse (MP)
- Mary Woodville (c. 1456–1481), English sister of Edward IV's Queen consort, Elizabeth Woodville, and of Anthony Woodville, 2nd Earl Rivers; first wife of William Herbert, 2nd Earl of Pembroke
- Mary Wriothesley, Countess of Southampton (1552–1607), wife of Henry Wriothesley, 2nd Earl of Southampton; mother of Henry Wriothesley, 3rd Earl of Southampton

== Actors ==
- Mary Ainslee (1914–1991), American actress
- Mary Akrivopoulou (born 1975), Greek actress
- Mary Ansell (actress) (1861–1950), English actress
- Mary Apick (born 1954), Iranian actress
- Mary Aroni (1916–1992), Greek actress
- Mary Astor (1906–1987), American actress
- Mary Badham (born 1952), American actress
- Mary Barclay (1916–2008), English actress
- Mary Begoña (1925–2020), Spanish actress
- Mary Kay Bergman (1961–1999), American voice actress
- Mary Birdsong (born 1968), American actress and comedian
- Mary Boland (1882–1965), American actress
- Mary Bradshaw (d. 1780), English actress
- Mary Brian (1906–2002), American actress
- Mary Bronstein (born 1979), American actress and film director
- Mary Brough (1863–1934), English actress
- Mary Bulkley (1747 or 1748–1792), English actress and dancer
- Mary Cadorette (born 1957), American actress
- Mary Carlisle (1914–2018), American actress and dancer
- Mary Carmen Ramírez (born 1932), Spanish actress
- Mary Carr (1874–1973), American actress
- Mary Carrillo (1919–2009), Spanish actress
- Mary Carver (1924–2013), American actress
- Mary Casson (1914–2009), English actress
- Mary Castle (1931–1998), American actress
- Mary Charleson (1890–1961), Irish actress
- Mary Charleston, Australian actress and choreographer
- Mary Cheung (born 1952), Hongkonger beauty pageant winner, image consultant, and actress
- Mary Chieffo (born 1992), American actress
- Mary Chronopoulou (1933–2023), Greek actress
- Mary Collinson (1952–2021), Maltese-British actress and model
- Mary Corbett, 17th-century English actress
- Mary Costa (born 1930), American actress and singer
- Mary Coustas (born 1964), Australian actress and writer
- Mary Crosby (born 1959), American actress
- Mary Dibley (1883–1968), British actress
- Mary Dimino (fl. 2008–2015), American actress and comedian
- Mary Doran (1910–1995), American actress
- Mary Dormal, 1930s and 1940s Argentine actress
- Mary Dresselhuys (1907–2004), Dutch actress
- Mary Elmy (1712–1792), British actress
- Mary Faber (fl. 2005–present), American actress
- Mary Fenton (c. 1854 – c. 1896), Indian actress
- Mary Fickett (1928–2011), American actress
- Mary Field (1909–1996), American actress
- Mary Forbes (1883–1974), British-American actress
- Mary Frann (1943–1998), American actress
- Mary Fuller (1888–1973), American actress
- Mary Galloway (fl. 2011–present), Canadian actress and film writer
- Mary Gannon (1829–1868), American actress
- Mary Germaine (born 1933), English actress
- Mary Gish (1876–1948), American actress
- Mary Gladstane, 19th-century Irish-American actress
- Mary Glynne (1895–1954), Welsh actress
- Mary Gross (born 1953), American actress and comedian
- Mary Harron (actress), American actress
- Mary Hartline (1927–2020), American actress and model
- Mary Hatcher (1929–2018), American actress and soprano
- Mary Heron (actress) (d. 1736), British actress
- Mary Hignett (1916–1980), British actress
- Mary Hon (born 1954), Hongkonger actress
- Mary Jerrold (1877–1955), English actress
- Mary Kent (before 1692 – after 1718), English actress
- Mary Kerridge (1914–1999), English actress
- Mary Kid (1901–1988), German actress
- Mary Knep (d. 1681), English actress
- Mary Kornman (1915–1973), American actress
- Mary Lalopoulou (1926–1989), Greek actress
- Mary LaRoche (1920–1999), American actress and singer
- Mary Lazarus (fl. 2002–present), Nigerian actress
- Mary Loos (1910–2004), American actress and screenwriter
- Mary MacArthur (actress) (1930–1949), American actress
- Mary Mackenzie (1922–1966), English actress
- Mary MacLaren (1900–1985), American actress
- Mary Maguire (1919–1974), Australian actress
- Mary Makhatho (1965–2017), South African actress
- Mary Mara (1960–2022), American actress
- Mary Marlowe (1884–1962), Australian actress and journalist
- Mary Marquet (1895–1979), French actress
- Mary Maude (fl. 1970–1991), British actress
- Mary Maurice (1844–1918), American actress
- Mary Mayberry (1907–1972), American actress
- Mary McAllister (1908–1991), American actress
- Mary McCarty (actress) (1923–1980), American actress, comedian, and singer
- Mary McCormack (born 1969), American actress
- Mary McDonnell (born 1952), American actress
- Mary McEvoy (born 1954), Irish actress
- Mary McIvor (1897–1941), American actress
- Mary Meade (1923–2003), American actress
- Mary Merrall (1890–1973), English actress
- Mary Mersch (1887–1956), American actress
- Mary Millington (1945–1979), English model and actress
- Mary Moder (1905–1993), American actress
- Mary Mouser (born 1996), American actress
- Mary Mozeen (1724 or before – 1773), British singer and actress
- Mary Murillo (1888–1944), English actress
- Mary Neely (born 1991), American actress and director
- Mary Newcomb (1893–1966), American actress
- Mary Newland (1903–1984), English actress
- Mary Nighy (born 1984), English actress
- Mary Njoku (born 1985), Nigerian actress
- Mary Odette (1901–1987), French actress
- Mary Oyaya (fl. 1993–present), Kenyan actress
- Mary Parets (fl. 1937–1943), Argentine actress
- Mary Peach (born 1934), British actress
- Mary Philbin (1902–1993), American actress
- Mary Philips (1901–1975), American actress
- Mary Queeny (1913–2003), Egyptian actress
- Mary Rawson, American actress
- Mary Riggans (1935–2013), Scottish actress
- Mary Rorke (1858–1938), British actress
- Mary Santpere (1913–1992), Spanish actress
- Mary Saunderson (1637–1712), English actress and singer
- Mary Scheer (born 1963), American actress
- Mary Sellers (born 1962), Italian actress
- Mary Servoss (1888–1968), American actress
- Mary Slingsby (d. 1693?), English actress
- Mary Stävin (born 1957), Swedish actress and model
- Mary Steenburgen (born 1953), American actress
- Mary Stein (fl. 1990–present), American actress
- Mary Stockley (fl. 2001–2021), British actress
- Mary Tamm (1950–2012), British actress
- Mary Tarcai (1906–1979), American actress
- Mary Testa (fl. 1979–present), American actress
- Mary Thurman (1895–1925), American actress
- Mary Treen (1907–1989), American actress
- Mary Tsoni (1987–2017), Greek actress and singer
- Mary Twala (1939–2020), South African actress
- Mary Uranta (fl. 2006–present), Nigerian actress
- Mary Ure (1933–1975), British actress
- Mary Vining (1790–1868), English actress
- Mary Walter (1912–1993), Filipino actress
- Mary Waltman (fl. 2006–2008), American actress
- Mary Warner (1804–1854), English actress and theatre manager
- Mary Welch (1922–1958), American actress
- Mary Whitfield (d. 1795), British actress
- Mary Wickes (1910–1995), American actress
- Mary Wimbush (1924–2005), English actress
- Mary Woodvine (born 1967), British actress
- Mary Woronov (born 1943), American actress
- Mary Wynn (1902–2001), American actress

== Politicians ==
- Mary Abrams (fl. 2019–2021), American politician
- Mary Auld (1893–1984), Scottish politician and women's organizer
- Mary Banotti (1939–2024), Irish politician
- Mary Batchelor (1927–2009), New Zealand trade unionist, feminist, and politician
- Mary Beattie (1923–2015), American politician
- Mary Beck (1908–2005), American politician, female activist, and journalist
- Mary Becker, American former schoolteacher, politician, and mayor
- Mary Begumisa (born 1976), Ugandan politician
- Mary L. Behrens (fl. 1987–1988), American politician
- Mary Bellamy (1861–1955), American teacher, politician, and suffragist
- Mary H. Boergers (born 1946), American politician and educator
- Mary Bono (born 1961), American politician, businesswoman, and lobbyist
- Mary B. Boren (fl. 2019–present), American politician
- Mary Bradfield (fl. 2021–present), American politician and retired teacher
- Mary Bradley (politician) (born 1942), Northern Irish politician
- Mary Brandenburg (born 1949), American politician
- Mary Brennan (Connecticut politician) (1910–1977), American politician
- Mary Brennan (Florida politician) (born 1954), American politician
- Mary Broadaway (fl. 2013–2017), American politician
- Mary Burrows (1932–2018), American politician
- Mary Caferro (born 1959), American politician
- Mary Cathcart (born 1942), American politician
- Mary Cheh (born 1950), American politician
- Mary Chen (born 1955), Taiwanese environmentalist and politician
- Mary Chiappe (d. 2017), Gibraltarian writer and politician
- Mary Cirelli (born 1939), American politician
- Mary Clancy (born 1948), Canadian politician
- Mary Z. Connaughton (born 1960), American politician
- Mary A. Conroy (1931–2014), American politician
- Mary Cosgrave (c. 1877 – 1941), Irish social worker and politician
- Mary Geigus Coulter (1859–1946), American lawyer and politician
- Mary Coyle (born 1954), Canadian politician
- Mary Creagh (born 1967), British politician
- Mary Denny (fl. 1993–2007), American politician
- Mary Deros (fl. 1998–present), Canadian politician
- Mary Donohue (born 1947), American retired educator, attorney, politician, and judge
- Mary Dreaver (1887–1961), New Zealand politician
- Mary DuBuisson (fl. 2018–2024), American politician
- Mary Duvall (born 1962), American politician
- Mary Dye (born 1961), American politician
- Mary L. Easley (fl. 1997–2010), American politician
- Mary Easson (born 1955), Australian politician
- Mary B. Edelen (born 1944), American politician
- Mary Eide (1924–2013), Norwegian politician
- Mary Ekstrom (born 1951), American politician
- Mary Fagan (born 1939), English politician
- Mary Fallin (born 1954), American politician
- Mary Fantasia (1919–2020), American politician
- Mary Farquharson (1901–1982), American politician
- Mary Fee (born 1954), Scottish politician
- Mary Felzkowski (born 1963), American businesswoman and politician
- Mary Figg (born 1934), American politician
- Mary Fitzpatrick (born 1969), Irish politician
- Mary Flake de Flores (born 1950), former First Lady of Honduras
- Mary E. Flowers (born 1951), American politician
- Mary L. Fonseca (1915–2005), American politician
- Mary Forsythe (1920–2007), American politician and music teacher
- Mary Fosse (fl. 2022–present), American politician
- Mary Fragedakis (born 1971), Canadian politician
- Mary Franson (born 1977), American politician
- Mary Freehill (born 1946), Irish politician
- Mary Freitas (fl. 2014–present), American politician
- Mary Fritz (1938–2016), American politician
- Mary Gallegos (fl. 2003–2005), American politician
- Mary Gant (born 1936), American politician
- Mary Gaskill (born 1941), American politician
- Mary A. Gillen (1894–1963), American politician
- Mary Gillett (born 1958), Australian politician
- Mary Gilu (fl. 1975–1977), Vanuatuan politician
- Mary Gingell (fl. 1991–1993), American politician
- Mary Glenski (born 1930), American politician
- Mary Glindon (born 1957), English politician
- Mary Gojack (1936–1985), American politician
- Mary González (born 1983), American politician
- Mary B. Goodhue (1921–2004), American lawyer and politician
- Mary Griffin (1926–2022), American politician
- Mary Grigg (1897–1971), New Zealand politician
- Mary Grizzle (1921–2006), American politician
- Mary Hagan-Harrell, American politician
- Mary Hales (fl. 2007–2010), American politician
- Mary Hanafin (born 1959), Irish politician
- Mary Harney (born 1953), Irish politician
- Mary Hartley (born 1954), American politician
- Mary Hayashi (born 1967), American politician
- Mary Herrera (born 1959), American politician
- Mary Hodder (born 1945), Canadian politician
- Mary Hodge (born 1946), American politician
- Mary Holt (1924–2021), British politician and judge
- Mary Honeyball (born 1952), British politician
- Mary Hooper, American politician and civic leader
- Mary Hubler (born 1952), American attorney and politician
- Mary Isaacson (born 1970), American politician
- Mary Jackman (1943–2022), Irish politician
- Mary Jeff (1873–1941), Scottish activist and politician
- Mary Kasten (born 1928), American politician
- Mary Keefe (fl. 2013–present), American politician
- Mary Kiffmeyer (born 1946), American politician
- Mary Killiktee (fl. 2021–present), Canadian politician
- Mary Kincaid-Chauncey (fl. 1997–2005), American politician
- Mary Theresa King-Myers (fl. 1938–1967), Canadian politician
- Mary Kolar (born 1958), American retired military officer and politician
- Mary E. Kramer (born 1935), American politician
- Mary O. Kryszak (1875–1945), American politician
- Mary Kunesh (born 1960), American politician
- Mary Landrieu (born 1955), American entrepreneur and politician
- Mary Lanigan (fl. 2002–2023), British politician
- Mary Lazich (born 1952), American politician
- Mary A. Lehman (born 1964), American politician
- Mary LeMessurier (1929–2018), Canadian politician
- Mary Lightbody (born 1952), American educator and politician
- Mary Lilly (1859–1930), American politician and social activist
- Mary Littleton (born 1957), American politician
- Mary Lundby (1948–2009), American politician
- Mary C. MacGuire (fl. 1993–1994), American politician
- Mary MacSwiney (1872–1942), Irish activist, politician, and teacher
- Mary Madison (born 1950), American politician
- Mary Madkour (1927–2013), American politician
- Mary Manross (fl. 2000–2009), American politician
- Mary Masanja (born 1975), Tanzanian politician
- Mary Mascher (born 1952), American politician
- Mary Mawai (fl. 2021–present), South Sudanese politician
- Mary C. McAdams (1869–1950), American politician
- Mary McAleese (born 1951), 8th President of Ireland
- Mary McAlister (1896–1976), Scottish politician
- Mary E. McAllister (1937–2020), American politician
- Mary McArdle, Irish politician
- Mary McCarty (born 1954), American politician
- Mary McClure (1939–2016), American politician
- Mary McGowan (1885–1980), American politician
- Mary McNally (born 1955), American politician and educator
- Mary McNeil (fl. 2009–2013), Canadian politician
- Mary McSorley (fl. 1981–1993), Irish politician
- Mary Mdziniso (1924–2000), Swazi politician
- Mary K. Meany (1897–2000), American politician and educator
- Mary Mead (1935–1996), American politician
- Mary Meillon (1919–1980), Australian politician
- Mary Mercer (1883–1945), British politician
- Mary Messier (born 1952), American politician
- Mary Metcalfe (born 1954), South African politician
- Mary Miller (politician) (born 1959), American politician
- Mary V. Mochary (born 1942), American politician and lawyer
- Mary Mooney (born 1958), Irish politician
- Mary Morales (fl. 2015–present), Venezuelan politician
- Mary Moriarty (born 1964), American politician
- Mary Mosiman (born 1962), American politician
- Mary Mugyenyi (born 1957), Ugandan politician
- Mary Mulhern (born 1959), American politician
- Mary Mulligan (born 1960), Scottish politician
- Mary Munive (born 1981), Second Vice President of Costa Rica
- Mary Musa (d. 2015), Sierra Leonean politician
- Mary Mushinsky (born 1951), American politician
- Mary Nagu (born 1952), Tanzanian politician
- Mary Naidu (fl. 1964–1970), Indian politician
- Mary Nelis (born 1935), Irish politician
- Mary Neuhauser (born 1934), American politician
- Mary Ng (born 1969), Canadian politician
- Mary L. Nock (1903–1987), American politician
- Mary Norwood (born 1952), American politician
- Mary E. Odde (1918–1990), American politician
- Mary H. Odom (1921–2014), American educator and politician
- Mary Ogg (1944 or 1945–2022), New Zealand politician
- Mary Karooro Okurut (born 1954), Ugandan educator, author, and politician
- Mary Olson (born 1958), American politician
- Mary O'Rourke (1937–2024), Irish politician
- Mary L. Padula (fl. 1983–1996), American former politician
- Mary Panzer (born 1951), American politician
- Mary Peltola (born 1973), American politician and former tribal judge
- Mary Peterson (1885–1973), American politician
- Mary Pickens (fl. 1995–2003), American politician
- Mary Pinkett (1926–2003), American politician
- Mary Polak (born 1967 or 1968), Canadian politician
- Mary Poling (born 1946), American politician
- Mary Previte (1932–2019), American politician
- Mary Pruitt (1934–2020), American politician
- Mary Putland (1783–1864), Australian politician
- Mary Quirk (1880–1952), Australian politician
- Mary Risteau (1890–1978), American politician
- Mary Robichaux (born 1955), American politician
- Mary Rogeness (born 1941), American politician
- Mary Salas (born 1948), American politician
- Mary Salisbury (1917–2008), English politician
- Mary Sawatzky (born 1961), American politician
- Mary Schneider (politician) (fl. 2014–present), American politician
- Mary Schryer (fl. 2006–2010), Canadian politician
- Mary K. Schwope (fl. 1974–1991), American politician
- Mary Seery Kearney (fl. 2019–present), Irish politician
- Mary Shadow (1925–1992), American politician
- Mary K. Shell (1927–2018), American politician
- Mary Shields (fl. 1999–2015), Irish politician
- Mary Shortall (born 1958), Canadian politician
- Mary Singleton (1926–1980), American politician and teacher
- Mary Skinner (1945–2009), American politician
- Mary E. Small (born 1954), American politician
- Mary Soderberg (fl. 2008–2015), American politician
- Mary Souza (fl. 2014–2022), American politician
- Mary Sykes (1896–1981), British politician and lawyer
- Mary Throne (born c. 1960), American politician
- Mary Thurston (fl. 2016–2022), New Zealander politician
- Mary Turok, South African politician and activist
- Mary Upton (born 1946), Irish politician
- Mary Valentine (born 1946), American politician
- Mary Vanderlinde (1929–2005), American politician
- Mary Varallo (1897–1979), American politician
- Mary Verner (born 1956), American politician
- Mary Wallace (born 1959), Irish politician
- Mary Welander (fl. 2021–present), American politician
- Mary Whiteford (born 1964), American politician
- Mary Willey (1941–2022), Australian politician
- Mary Wolfe (born 1963), American politician
- Mary Wooldridge (born 1967), Australian politician
- Mary Yap (born 1951), Malaysian politician
- Mary Zoghby (born 1933), American politician
- Mary Zone (1919–2005), American politician

== Spouses ==
- Mary Brickell, American wife of William Brickell
- Mary Bushiri, Malawian wife of Shepherd Bushiri
- Mary Cowen, Irish wife of Brian Cowen
- Mary Drelincourt (c. 1678 – 1755), Welsh benefactor and wife of Peter Drelincourt
- Mary Fenech Adami (1933–2011), Maltese wife of Eddie Fenech Adami
- Mary Groves (d. 1870), English wife of George Müller
- Mary Guillermin, American family therapist and artist and wife of John Guillermin
- Mary Haydon, English wife of George Silver
- Mary Lum (1758–1815), American wife of Stephen Girard
- Mary Mandeville, Irish wife of John Mandeville
- Mary Marquardt, American wife of Harrison Ford from 1964 to 1979
- Mary Max (1966–2019), American animal rights activist and wife of Peter Max
- Mary McGlinchey, Irish wife of Dominic McGlinchey
- Mary Meachum (c. 1805 – 1869), American wife of John Berry Meachum
- Mary Moutray (c. 1752 – 1844), American wife of John Moutray
- Mary Oldfield (1793–1875), American and 47th wife of Brigham Young
- Mary Ormond (c. 1702 – c. 1759), American wife of Blackbeard
- Mary Pardoe (1768–1844), Australian convict and wife of Peter Hibbs
- Mary Pennyman (1630–1701), English religious polemicist and wife of John Pennyman
- Mary Perdue, American wife of Sonny Perdue
- Mary Pingo, English wife of Thomas Pingo
- Mary Pordage, English wife of Samuel Pordage
- Mary Plummer (1849–1922), American-born pupil and wife of Georges Clemenceau
- Mary Rockefeller (1907–1999), American wife of Nelson A. Rockefeller from 1930 to 1962
- Mary Scheier (1908–2007), American ceramic artist and wife of Edwin Scheier
- Mary Schoonmaker (d. 1917), American and first wife of Alton B. Parker
- Mary Sellwood, English journalist and wife of Arthur V. Sellwood
- Mary Stead, American wife of Charles Cotesworth Pinckney
- Mary Steele (1678–1718), Welsh landowner and wife of Sir Richard Steele
- Mary Tarrero-Serrano (1924–2010), Cuban politician and second wife of Carlos Prío Socarrás
- Mary Van Cott (1844–1884), American and 52nd wife of Brigham Young
- Mary Weld, English wife of Thomas Allen

== Other people ==
- Mary (slave) (c. 1824–1838), American teenage slave executed for murder
- Mary A. Ahrens (1836–1921), English-American teacher, lawyer, and social reformer
- Mary Langs Argo (died 1984), American physicist
- Mary A. Aston (c. 1836–1913), American army nurse during the American Civil War
- Mary Atkinson (suffragette), British suffragette and trade unionist
- Mary Alice Barton (1917–2003), American quilter, quilt historian, collector, and philanthropist
- Mary A. Blood (1851–1927), American teacher of elocution and expression
- Mary A. Bomar (1944–2022), English-born American national park service director
- Mary Forrest Bradley (1869–1965), American historian
- Mary A. Brigham (1829–1889), American educator
- Mary A. Brinkman (1846–1932), American homeopathic physician
- Mary Brownell (1929–2017), Liberian peace activist
- Mary Antoinette Brown-Sherman (1926–2004), Liberian educator and first woman head of a university or college in Africa
- Mary A. Conlon (1870–1936), American elementary school principal
- Mary A. Cornelius (1829–1918), American author and social reformer
- Mary A. G. Dight (1860–1923), American physician
- Mary A. Hickey (1874–1954), American nurse and health administrator
- Mary A. Kingsbury (1865–1958), American school library pioneer
- Mary A. Legere, American retired army general
- Mary A. McCurdy (1852–1934), African-American temperance advocate and suffragist
- Mary A. Reardon (1912–2002), American liturgical artist and illustrator of children's books
- Mary Abel (c. 1850–1938), American food writer
- Mary Abichi (born 1990), British track and field sprinter
- Mary Abney (1676–1750), English landowner
- Mary Abukutsa-Onyango (born 1959), Kenyan humanitarian and agricultural scientist
- Mary Adair (born 1936), American Cherokee Nation educator and painter
- Mary Adshead (1904–1995), English painter, muralist, illustrator, and designer
- Mary Aggie, 18th-century African-American slave who participated in a trial that resulted in Virginia allowing slaves to claim benefit of clergy
- Mary Agria (born 1941), American writer
- Mary Aikenhead (1787–1858), Irish Roman Catholic nun and health professional
- Mary Ainsworth (1913–1999), American-Canadian developmental psychologist
- Mary Ajami (1888–1965), Syrian poet and pioneering feminist writer in Arabic
- Mary Akinyemi (born 1954), Nigerian former sprinter
- Mary Akor (born 1976), Nigerian-American athlete
- Mary Akrami (born 1975/1976), Afghan women's rights activist
- Mary Al-Atrash (born 1994), Palestinian swimmer
- Mary Albert (born 1952), American earth scientist and professor of engineering
- Mary Albertson (1838–1914), American botanist and astronomer
- Mary Alcock (c. 1742–1798), English poet, essayist, and philanthropist
- Mary Alcorn (1866–1928), New Zealand interior designer and business owner
- Mary Alessi, American Christian songwriter and worship leader
- Mary Alfonsi, real name of Donna Christanello (1942–2011), American professional wrestler
- Mary Alger (1838–1894), British headmistress
- Mary Aline Wilshin, birth name of Sunday Wilshin (1905–1991), British actress and radio producer
- Mary Allerton (c. 1616–1699), Dutch settler of Plymouth Colony
- Mary Allies (1852–1927), English Roman Catholic historian, writer, and translator
- Mary Allis (1899–1987), American dealer of art and antiques
- Mary Allitt (1925–2013), Australian cricketer
- Mary Alment (1834–1908), Irish landscape- and portrait artist
- Mary Almond (1928–2015), English physicist, radio astronomer, palaeomagnetist, mathematician, and computer scientist
- Mary Almy (1883–1967), American architect
- Mary Aloe, American film- and television producer
- Mary Alwyn, alternate name of Doreen Carwithen (1922–2003), English composer of classical- and film music
- Mary Ama, Cook Islands-New Zealand artist and community arts organiser
- Mary Ambler (1805–1868), American humanitarian and fuller
- Mary Ambree (fl. 1584), English army soldier
- Mary Amdur (1921–1998), American toxicologist and public health researcher
- Mary Amiti, Australian economist
- Mary Amons, American cast member on The Real Housewives of D.C.
- Mary Amponsah (born 2006), Ghanaian professional footballer
- Mary Andersson (1929–2020), Swedish author and playwright
- Mary Andross (1893–1968), Scottish chemist
- Mary Anning (1799–1847), English fossil collector, dealer, and palaeontologist
- Mary Ansell (?–1899), English woman executed for murder
- Mary Anselmo, American billionaire businesswoman
- Mary Anthony (1916–2014), American choreographer, modern dancer, and dance teacher
- Mary Antin (1881–1949), American author and immigration rights activist
- Mary Appelhof (1936–2005), American biologist, vermicomposter, and environmentalist
- Mary Applebey (1916–2012), English civil servant and mental health campaigner
- Mary Archer (born 1944), English scientist, educator, and businesswoman
- Mary Armanios, American oncologist and professor
- Mary Armine (?–1676), English gentlewoman and benefactor
- Mary Arrigan (born 1943), Irish illustrator, artist, and novelist
- Mary Ashley (1931–1996), American video- and performance artist and painter
- Mary Ashun (born 1968), Ghanaian-Canadian educator, author, and researcher
- Mary Astell (1666–1731), English protofeminist writer, philosopher, and rhetorician
- Mary Audsley (1919–2008), English painter and sculptor
- Mary Ayubi, Afghan filmmaker and journalist
- Mary Azarian (born 1940), American woodcut artist and children's book illustrator
- Mary Azcuenaga (born 1945), American attorney
- Mary Azrael (born 1943), American author and poet
- Mary B. Malveaux (born 1967), American lawyer and judge
- Mary B. McCord, American lawyer, national security analyst, and former government official
- Mary B. Moser (1924–2013), American field linguist and Bible translator
- Mary B. Schuenemann (1898–1992), American painter
- Mary B. Warlick (born 1957), Australian-born American diplomat
- Mary B. Weaver (1887–1978), American farmer and state legislator
- Mary Bacon (1948–1991), American Thoroughbred jockey and model
- Mary Baguley (?–1675), English woman who was executed for witchcraft
- Mary Baines (1932–2020), British palliative care physician
- Mary Ballou (1809–1894), American memoirist
- Mary Balogh (born 1944), Welsh-Canadian novelist
- Mary Bamber (1874–1938), Scottish socialist, trade unionist, social worker, and suffragist
- Mary Bancroft (1903–1997), American novelist and spy
- Mary Bankes (c. 1598–1661), English cavalier
- Mary Barbour (1875–1958), Scottish political activist, local councillor, bailie, and magistrate
- Mary Bard (1904–1970), American writer
- Mary Barkas (1889–1959), New Zealand psychiatrist, physician, and author
- Mary Barksdale (1920–1992), African-American nurse, businesswoman, and civil rights activist
- Mary Barkworth (born 1941), English-born American botanist and professor emerita
- Mary Barnard (1909–2001), American poet, biographer, and translator
- Mary Barra (born 1961), American businesswoman
- Mary Barratt Due (1888–1969), Norwegian pianist
- Mary Bartelme (1866–1954), American judge and lawyer
- Mary Bass (1905–1996), American journalist, writer, and executive editor
- Mary Bastholm, English murder victim
- Mary Bastian (1948–1985), Sri Lankan Tamil human rights activist and Roman Catholic priest
- Mary Batcher, American statistician
- Mary Bateman (1768–1809), English alleged witch who was executed for murder
- Mary Bateson (historian) (1865–1906), English historian and suffrage activist
- Mary Batten (born 1937), American science writer
- Mary Battersby (fl. 1801–1841), Irish artist and naturalist
- Mary Bauermeister (1934–2023), German artist
- Mary Baughman (1874–1956), American physician, medical school professor, and clubwoman
- Mary Baumgartner (1930–2018), American AAGPBL player
- Mary Bayley (1816–1899), British temperance activist and pamphlet writer
- Mary Bayliss (1940–2019), English magistrate
- Mary Baynton (c. 1515–?), English impostor
- Mary Beal (1878–1964), American botanist
- Mary Beale (1633–1699), English portrait painter
- Mary Beams (born 1945), American artist and animator
- Mary Beasley (1933–2024), Australian public servant and business executive
- Mary Beaton (c. 1543–1597), Scottish courtier and poet
- Mary Beaudry (1950–2020), American archaeologist, educator, and author
- Mary Beckerle, American cell biologist
- Mary Beckett (1926–2013), Irish author
- Mary Beckinsale (?–2019), English art historian
- Mary Beckman (born 1953), American professor emerita of linguistics
- Mary Bedford (1907–1997), South African freestyle swimmer
- Mary Beever (1802–1883), British artist and botanist
- Mary Behrend, 19th-century American philanthropist
- Mary Beilby (c. 1750–1797), English enameller and glass-painter
- Mary Beisiegel, Canadian-born American associate professor of mathematics
- Mary Beloff, Argentine jurist
- Mary Benton (1855–1944), English headteacher
- Mary Benwell (1739–?), English artist, miniaturist, and pastellist
- Mary Berenson (1864–1945), American art historian
- Mary Berenice Rice (1902-1991), Catholic nun and psychologist
- Mary Berg (1924–2013), Polish Holocaust survivor and diarist
- Mary Berg (chef) (born 1989), Canadian television host, author, and cook
- Mary Bergin (born 1949), Irish folk musician
- Mary Berkeley (born 1965), English retired long jumper
- Mary Berkheiser, American lawyer and professor of law
- Mary Berko (born 1988), Ghanaian footballer
- Mary Bernheim (1902–1997), English biochemist
- Mary Bettans (c. 1788–1859), English dressmaker
- Mary Beyt (born 1959), American artist
- Mary Biddinger (born 1974), American poet, editor, and academic
- Mary Bidwell (1881–1996), American supercentenarian
- Mary Bierbaum (born 1955), American writer
- Mary Birdsall (1828–1894), American suffragette, temperance worker, and journalist
- Mary Birshtein (1902–1992), Soviet social scientist
- Mary Bishai (born 1970), American physicist
- Mary Blade (1913–1994), American engineer, camp director, and professor
- Mary Blandy (c. 1720–1752), English murderer
- Mary Blathwayt (1879–1961), English feminist, suffragette, and social reformer
- Mary Blewett (born 1938), American author and academic
- Mary Blue, American neurobiologist, computational neurologist, and associate professor
- Mary Bluett (born 1951), Australian trade unionist and teacher
- Mary Blume, American historian and biographer
- Mary Bly (born 1962), American writer and professor
- Mary Boakye (born 2000), Ghanaian track and field athlete
- Mary Bock, American journalist and professor of journalism
- Mary Boggs (1920–2002), American muralist and textbook author
- Mary Boies (born 1950), American attorney
- Mary Bolton (addiction counsellor) (1920–1996), Irish counsellor and (non-clinical) psychotherapist
- Mary Bonauto (born 1961), American lawyer and civil rights advocate
- Mary Bonner (1887–1935), American printmaker
- Mary Bonney (1816–1900), American educator and advocate for Native American rights
- Mary Bonnin, American underwater diver and former U.S. Navy sailor
- Mary Bookstaver (1875–1950), American feminist, political activist, and editor
- Mary Everest Boole (1832–1916), English mathematician
- Mary Boone (born 1951/1952), American art dealer and collector
- Mary Booze (1878–1955), American political organizer and activist
- Mary Boquitas (born 1969), Mexican singer and actress
- Mary Borden (1886–1968), American-British novelist and poet
- Mary Borgstrom (1916–2019), Canadian potter, ceramist, and artist
- Mary Borkowski (1916–2008), American fiber artist
- Mary Bothwell (1900–?), Canadian classical vocalist and painter
- Mary Botsford (1865–1939), American anesthesiologist
- Mary Boulding (1929–2009), English Roman Catholic nun, theologian, writer, and translator
- Mary Bourke-Dowling (1882–1944), Irish suffragette and republican
- Mary Bousted (born 1959), British trade unionist
- Mary Bouxsein, American biomechanical engineer and orthopedic researcher
- Mary Bowerman (1908–2005), American botanist
- Mary Bowermaster (1917–2011), American masters athlete
- Mary Bowman (1908–2002), American economist
- Mary Bownes (born 1948), English molecular- and developmental biologist, and emerita professor
- Mary Bowser, 19th-century American Union spy during the American Civil War
- Mary Box (?–1679), English school founder
- Mary Boyoi (born 1974), South Sudanese singer and author
- Mary Bradburn (1918–2000), British mathematics educator
- Mary Bradbury (1615–1700), English-born American convicted witch, but not executed
- Mary Brady (1821–1864), American nurse in the American Civil War
- Mary Brannagan, Irish chess player
- Mary Brant (c. 1736–1796), Canadian Mohawk leader
- Mary Brave Bird (1954–2013), Sicangu Lakota writer and activist
- Mary Brazier (1904–1995), English-born American neuroscientist
- Mary Brebner (1858–1933), Scottish teacher and classical scholar
- Mary Breen (1933–1977), Australian athlete
- Mary Brewster (c. 1569–1627), English-born American Pilgrim, and a Mayflower passenger
- Mary Bright (1954–2002), Scottish curtain designer
- Mary Brinton, American sociologist
- Mary Bristow (?–1805), British landscape architect and embroiderer
- Mary Broad (1860–1942), British entrepreneur and Bournemouth headmistress
- Mary Broadhurst (1860–1928), English agricultural reformer and radical
- Mary Brockert, real name of Teena Marie (1956–2010), American singer, songwriter, and producer
- Mary Brodrick (1858–1933), English archaeologist and Egyptologist
- Mary Broh (born 1951), Liberian former mayor
- Mary Brook (c. 1726–1782), British Quaker, preacher, and writer
- Mary Brooksbank (1897–1978), Scottish mill worker, socialist, trade unionist, and songwriter
- Mary Brosnan (1906–1988), American businesswoman and mannequin designer
- Mary Brück (1925–2008), Irish astronomer, astrophysicist, and historian of science
- Mary Brunner (born 1943), American criminal
- Mary Brunton (1778–1818), Scottish novelist
- Mary Brush, 19th-century American inventor, engineer, and businesswoman
- Mary Brydon, English nurse
- Mary Bubb (1920–1988), American journalist
- Mary Bucholtz (born 1966), American professor of linguistics
- Mary Buckland (1797–1857), English palaeontologist, marine biologist, and scientific illustrator
- Mary Buff (1890–1970), American creator of illustrated children's books
- Mary Buick (1777–1854), Scottish nurse
- Mary Bumby (1811–1862), English-born New Zealand missionary and beekeeper
- Mary Bunting (1910–1998), American bacterial geneticist and college president
- Mary Burchell (1904–1986), English campaigner for Jewish refugees, and romance novelist
- Mary Burger (born 1948), American professional rodeo cowgirl and barrel racer
- Mary Burkett (1924–2014), English art curator and non-fiction writer
- Mary Burrell (1865–?), American educator and businesswoman
- Mary Burzminski (born 1960), Canadian middle-distance runner
- Mary Butcher (1927–2018), American AAGPBL pitcher
- Mary Butters (c. 1770–c. 1850), Irish witch
- Mary Butterworth (1686–1775), American counterfeiter
- Mary Butts (1890–1937), English modernist writer
- Mary Byfield (1795–1871), English book illustrator and wood engraver
- Mary Byker, English singer, record producer, and DJ
- Mary C. Baltz (1923–2011), American soil scientist
- Mary C. Boys (born 1947), American scholar of religious studies
- Mary C. Juhas (born 1955), American engineer
- Mary C. Lobban (1922–1982), British-born Canadian physiologist
- Mary C. MacNiven (1905–1997), Gaelic singer
- Mary C. Noble (born 1949), American former Supreme Court judge
- Mary C. Pangborn (1907–2003), American scientist and writer of science fiction
- Mary C. Pearl (born 1950), American environmental scientist and former dean
- Mary C. Pendleton (born 1940), American retired diplomat
- Mary C. Seward (1839–1919), American poet, composer, parliamentarian, and philanthropist
- Mary C. Tanner (born 1951), American venture capitalist and investment banker
- Mary C. Whitman (1809–1875), American educator
- Mary Cadogan (1928–2014), English author
- Mary Caesar (c. 1677–1741), English writer and Jacobite activist
- Mary Cagle (born 1989), American webcomic artist
- Mary Cagnin (born 1990), Brazilian comic artist
- Mary Calcaño (1906–1992), Venezuelan aviator
- Mary Calderone (1904–1998), American physician, author, public speaker, and public health advocate for reproductive rights and sex education
- Mary Callahan Erdoes (born 1967), American investment manager and businesswoman
- Mary Callery (1903–1977), American artist
- Mary Calvi, American television journalist and author
- Mary Campion (1687–1706), English singer and dancer
- Mary Canberg (1918–2004), American violinist, conductor, and music educator
- Mary Cannell (1913–2000), English educator and historian of mathematical physics
- Mary Cannon, Irish psychiatrist, research scientist, public figure, and anti-cannabis advocate
- Mary Cantwell (1930–2000), American journalist and novelist
- Mary Carbery (1867–1949), English author
- Mary Card (1861–1940), Australian designer and educator
- Mary Carewe, English singer and vocal coach
- Mary Carillo (born 1957), American sportscaster and former professional tennis player
- Mary Carleton (1642–1673), English socialite and fraudster who was executed
- Mary Carlin (1873–1939), British trade unionist
- Mary Carnell (1861–1925), American photographer and clubwoman
- Mary Carrington, American immunologist
- Mary Carruthers (born 1941), American professor emeritus of English
- Mary Carryl (?–1809), Irish servant and companion of the Ladies of Llangollen
- Mary Carskadon, American professor of psychiatry and human behavior, and researcher of sleep
- Mary Cartwright (1900–1998), British mathematician
- Mary Carty, American musician, songwriter, and music arranger
- Mary Cassatt (1844–1926), American painter and printmaker
- Mary Cassidy, Irish singer
- Mary Castillo (born 1974), American author
- Mary Catlyn, English mother of nobleman Robert Spencer, 1st Baron Spencer of Wormleighton
- Mary Catterall (1922–2015), English medical doctor and sculptor
- Mary Cawse (1808–1850), British opera singer
- Mary Cecil, 2nd Baroness Amherst of Hackney (1857–1919), English hereditary peer, charity worker, archaeologist, and ornithologist
- Mary Chadwick (?–1943), English nurse and psychoanalyst
- Mary Challis, pen name of Sara Woods (1922–1985), English mystery writer
- Mary Chamberlain (born 1947), English novelist and historian
- Mary Chamot (1899–1993), Russian-born English art historian and museum curator
- Mary Champion de Crespigny (c. 1749–1812), English novelist and letter writer
- Mary Chandler (1687–1745), English poet
- Mary Channing (1687–1706), English woman who was executed for murder
- Mary Chapman, British businesswoman
- Mary Cuningham Chater (1896–1990), English composer, author, music advisor, and editor
- Mary Chavelita Dunne Bright, real name of George Egerton (1859–1945), Australian-born Irish writer of short stories, novels, plays, and translations
- Mary Chawner, 19th-century English silversmith
- Mary Chayko (born 1960), American sociologist and professor of communication and information
- Mary Cheke (c. 1532–1616), English courtier, poet, and epigrammatist
- Mary Chemweno (born 1959), Kenyan former middle-distance runner
- Mary Cheney (born 1969), American daughter of retired politician and businessman Dick Cheney
- Mary Chess (1878–1964), American perfumer
- Mary Chiarella (born 1952), Australian academic, nurse, author, and professor emerita
- Mary Chichester (1801–1876), English Catholic diarist
- Mary Chilton (1607–1679), English Pilgrim
- Mary Chind-Willie (born 1967), American photographer
- Mary Chinery-Hesse (born 1938), Ghanaian civil servant and diplomat
- Mary Chipperfield (1937–2014), British circus entertainer
- Mary Cholhok (born 1997), South Sudanese-born Ugandan professional netball player
- Mary Christianna Milne, birth name of Christianna Brand (1907–1988), British crime writer and children's author
- Mary Christy (born 1952), Luxembourgish singer
- Mary Chubb (1903–2003), British writer and archaeologist
- Mary Chudleigh (1656–1710), English poet
- Mary Chulkhurst (1100–1134), English conjoined twin
- Mary Chun, American conductor
- Mary Churchill (puppeteer) (1930–1997), American puppeteer, educator, and entrepreneur
- Mary Clem (1905–1979), American mathematician and human computer
- Mary Clement (1863–1944), Luxembourgish-born American serial killer
- Mary Clifford, 18th-century English murder victim
- Mary Clinton (born 1960), New Zealand former field hockey player
- Mary Clive (1907–2010), British writer and historian
- Mary Clouston Dive, real name of Mollie Dive (1913–1997), Australian scientist and cricketer
- Mary Cloyd Burnley Stifler (1876–1956), American botanist
- Mary Clutter (1930–2019), American plant biologist
- Mary Clyde (born 1953), American short story writer
- Mary Coate (1886–1972), English historian
- Mary Dora Coghill (c. 1869–1957), American teacher, vice principal, principal, and civic leader
- Mary Cohan (1909–1983), American composer and lyricist
- Mary Coleridge (1861–1907), English novelist and poet
- Mary Collier (1688–1762), English poet
- Mary Collin (1860–1955), English teacher and campaigner for women's suffrage
- Mary Colling (1804–1853), British poet and domestic servant
- Mary Collson (1870–1952), American feminist activist and Christian scientist
- Mary Collyer (c. 1716–1763), English translator and novelist
- Mary Colquhoun (1836–1920), Scottish writer
- Mary Colter (1869–1958), American architect and designer
- Mary Colton (1822–1898), Australian philanthropist and suffragist
- Mary-Russell Ferrell Colton (1889–1971), American artist and author
- Mary Colum (1884–1957), Irish-born American literary critic and author
- Mary Colvin (1907–1988), English WRAC director and equestrian
- Mary Colwell, English environmentalist author and producer
- Mary Conley, American contestant on The Amazing Race (American TV series)
- Mary Conn, nickname of Michelle Conn (born 1963), Canadian former field hockey player
- Mary Connealy (born 1956), American author of Christian fiction
- Mary Coombs (1929–2022), British computer programmer and schoolteacher
- Mary Corkling (1850–1938), English painter and food reformer
- Mary Corner (1899–1962), British pharmacist, cotton worker, and chemist
- Mary Cornwall Legh (1857–1941), English Anglican missionary
- Mary Corse (born 1945), American artist
- Mary Cortani, American Army veteran and dog trainer
- Mary Corylé (1894–1976), Ecuadorian writer and poet
- Mary Cosby, American cast member on The Real Housewives of Salt Lake City
- Mary Cosh (1919–2019), English freelance journalist, historian, and Royal Navy personnel during World War II
- Mary Coulcher (1852–1925), British philanthropist and hospital head
- Mary Coulshed (1904–1998), British Army officer
- Mary Cowan (1863–1898), American serial killer
- Mary Cramer (1893–1984), Australian charity- and community worker
- Mary Crawler (c. 1854–1935), Hunkpapa Sioux woman who fought during the Battle of Little Big Horn
- Mary Cresswell (born 1937), American-born New Zealand poet
- Mary Crichton, Viscountess Crichton (1883–1959), English daughter of Hugh Grosvenor, 1st Duke of Westminster
- Mary Critchett (?–1729), English pirate and convict
- Mary Croarken, British independent scholar and author
- Mary Crocker, American murder victim
- Mary Cronk (1934–2018), Scottish independent midwife
- Mary Crooke (fl. 1657–1692), Irish printer and bookseller
- Mary Crooks (born 1950), Australian feminist and public policy specialist
- Mary Cross (born 1934), American professor, editor, writer, and biographer
- Mary Croughan, American epidemiologist and academic administrator
- Mary Crow, American poet, translator, and professor
- Mary Crudelius (1839–1877), British campaigner for women's education and women's suffrage
- Mary Cruger (1834–1908), American novelist
- Mary Crumpe (?–1861), Irish novelist
- Mary Cuddie (1823–1889), Scottish-born New Zealand farmwife, midwife, and shopkeeper
- Mary Cullen (born 1982), Irish long-distance runner
- Mary Cullinan (1950–2021), American academic administrator
- Mary Cummings (1839–1927), American academic and philanthropist
- Mary Ellen Cusack (1833–1900), Australian-British botanist
- Mary Cushman, American vascular hematologist and professor of medicine and pathology
- Mary Custy, Irish musician
- Mary Cutts (1814–1856), American socialite, historian, and memoirist
- Mary Cybulski, American script supervisor and film director
- Mary Czerwinski, American cognitive scientist and computer-human interaction expert
- Mary D. Cullen (born 1929), Irish college tutor and women's movement activist
- Mary D. Diehl (fl. early 1900s), American police officer
- Mary D. Lowman (1842–1912), American schoolteacher and mayor
- Mary D. Powers (1922–2016), American civil rights activist
- Mary D. Sammel, American biostatistician and professor
- Mary Daheim (1937–2022), American writer of romance- and mystery novels
- Mary Dailey (1928–1965), American AAGPBL pitcher
- Mary Dallas (1952–2023), Scottish-born Australian archaeologist
- Mary Dalrymple (born 1954), British linguist and professor
- Mary Dalton (born 1950), Canadian poet and educator
- Mary Daniel, American general district court judge
- Mary Dann (1923–2005), Western Shoshone Native American spiritual leader, rancher, and cultural-, spiritual-, and land rights activist
- Mary Darly, 18th-century English printseller and caricaturist
- Mary Dasso, American biochemist
- Mary Davenport Engberg (1880–1951), American violinist, composer, and conductor
- Mary Davys (1674?–1732), Irish novelist and playwright
- Mary Dawa, South Sudanese footballer
- Mary de Bode (1700s–1812), French baroness
- Mary de Bunsen (1910–1982), Spanish-born British ATA pilot and author
- Mary de Cervellione (1230–1290), Spanish Roman Catholic saint
- Mary de Garmo Buel, American mother of U.S. Army officer Eugene Fechet
- Mary de Lellis Gough (1892–1983), Irish-born American nun and mathematician
- Mary de Lourdes Gogan (1908–2000), Irish nun and missionary nurse in Nigeria
- Mary De Morgan (1850–1907), English writer
- Mary de Piro (born 1946), Maltese artist
- Mary de Rachewiltz (1925–2026), Italian-American poet and translator
- Mary de Sousa (1890–1953), Indian-Kenyan doctor
- Mary De Garis (1881–1963), Australian medical doctor
- Mary De la Beche Nicholl (1839–1922), Welsh lepidopterist and mountaineer
- Mary De Vera, Canadian pharmacoepidemiologist, health services researcher, and academic
- Mary Dearborn, American biographer and author
- Mary DeChambres, American film- and television editor
- Mary Decker (born 1958), American middle-distance runner
- Mary Deconge (1933–2025), American mathematician and former nun
- Mary DeDecker (1909–2000), American botanist, conservationist, and environmentalist
- Mary DeGenaro (born 1961), American lawyer and former Supreme Court justice
- Mary DeMarle, video game writer
- Mary DeMelim (1930–2012), American academic administrator
- Mary Dempster (born 1955), Canadian volleyball player
- Mary Dendy (1855–1933), Welsh educational theorist, eugenicist, writer, and mental health activist
- Mary Denness (1937–2017), English ship's steward, school nurse, and matron
- Mary Dennett (1872–1947), American women's rights activist, pacifist, homeopathic advocate, and pioneer
- Mary Dennett (prior) (1730–1781), English Roman Catholic nun
- Mary DePiero (born 1968), Canadian diver
- Mary Dering (1629–1704), English composer
- Mary DeRosa, American lawyer and professor of law
- Mary Desha (1850–1911), American educator and activist
- Mary Detournay, Belgian international table tennis player
- Mary Devens (1857–1920), American photographer
- Mary Deverell (1731–1805), English moral- and religious essayist
- Mary Dewson (1874–1962), American feminist and political activist
- Mary Deyo (1858–1932), American teacher and Christian missionary
- Mary Dhalapany (born 1953), Indigenous Australian contemporary artist
- Mary Dicas (fl. 1800–1818), English businesswoman and scientific instrument maker
- Mary Dick (1791–1883), British philanthropist
- Mary Dickens (1838–1896), English daughter of novelist Charles Dickens
- Mary Dickenson-Auner (1880–1965), Irish violinist, composer, and music teacher
- Mary Dignam (1857–1938), Canadian painter, teacher, and art organizer
- Mary Dillwyn (1816–1906), Welsh photographer
- Mary di Michele (born 1949), Italian-Canadian poet and author
- Mary Dimke (born 1977), American lawyer and district judge
- Mary Dinah, Nigerian hotelier, social entrepreneur, humanitarian, and human rights activist
- Mary Dingman (1875–1961), American social- and peace activist
- Mary Doakes (1936–2019), African-American school teacher and education administrator
- Mary Dobbs, birth name of Mollie Sneden (1709–1810), American ferry service operator
- Mary Dobie (1850–1880), English-born New Zealand painter who was murdered
- Mary Dobkin (1902–1987), American sports coach and advocate for children
- Mary Dobson, ring name of Sarah Logan (born 1993), American professional wrestler
- Mary Dobson (1912–1977), English artist
- Mary Docherty (1908–2000), Scottish activist
- Mary Docter (born 1961), American speed skater
- Mary Docwra (1847–1914), British temperance activist
- Mary Dodson (1932–2016), American art director
- Mary Dohey (1933–2017), Canadian airline flight attendant who stopped a hijacking
- Mary Dolim (1925–2002), American children's writer
- Mary Donington (1909–1987), English musician and sculptor
- Mary Dooley, birth name of Nita Naldi (1894–1961), American stage performer and silent film actress
- Mary Dorcey (born 1950), Irish author, poet, feminist, and LGBT+ activist
- Mary Dover (fl. 1908), Canadian chemist
- Mary Downer (1924–2014), South Australian philanthropist and military personnel
- Mary Downing (c. 1815–1881), Irish poet and nationalist
- Mary Dozier, American psychologist
- Mary Draper (1719–1810), American woman who helped the Continental Army during the American Revolution
- Mary Dreier (1875–1963), American social reformer
- Mary Duff (born 1964), Irish country-, pop-, and folk singer
- Mary Duffy, American feminist fashion expert, spokeswoman, entrepreneur, author, and motivational speaker
- Mary Duggan (1925–1973), English cricketer
- Mary Dumont, American chef
- Mary Dunleavy (born 1966), American soprano
- Mary Dunlop (1912–2003), Irish dog trainer, activist, and philanthropist
- Mary Dunnell (fl. 1807–1811), English preacher
- Mary Durack (1913–1994), Australian author and historian
- Mary Durojaye (born 1990), English professional basketball player
- Mary Dutch (born 1944), American wheelchair curler
- Mary Dwight (born 1951), American former handball player
- Mary Dyckman (1886–1982), American advocate for labor protections
- Mary E. Balfour (fl. 1789–1810), Irish poet
- Mary E. Bibb (1820–1877 or the early 1880s), American-born Canadian educator and abolitionist leader
- Mary E. Bouligny (1839–1908), American socialite and author
- Mary E. Britton (1855–1925), American physician, educator, suffragist, journalist, and civil rights activist
- Mary E. C. Bancker (1860–1921), American author
- Mary E. Cobb (1852–1902), American manicurist and cosmetics manufacturer
- Mary E. Costanza (born 1937), American retired doctor and professor
- Mary E. Eato (1844–1915), African-American suffragist and teacher
- Mary E. Elliot (1851–1942), American writer and lecturer
- Mary E. Gladwin (1861–1939), English-born American nurse
- Mary E. Guy, American political scientist, public administration scholar, academic, and author
- Mary E. Haggart (1843–1904), American suffragist
- Mary E. Hazeltine (1868–1949), American librarian
- Mary E. Hewitt (1818–1894), American poet and editor
- Mary E. Ireland (1834–1927), American author and translator
- Mary E. Klotman (born 1954), American physician-scientist and academic administrator
- Mary E. Larimer, American psychologist and academic
- Mary E. Lovely (born 1956), American professor emeritus of economics
- Mary Stanley Low (1912–2007), British-Cuban political activist, surrealist poet, artist and Latin teacher
- Mary E. Merritt (1881–1953), American nurse
- Mary E. Peabody (1891–1981), American civil-rights- and anti-war activist
- Mary E. Reuder (1923–2017), American experimental psychologist, statistician, and licensed clinical psychologist
- Mary E. Schick (1885–1951), American librarian
- Mary E. Switzer (1900–1971), American public administrator and social reformer
- Mary E. Tusch (1874/1875–1960), American aviation collector
- Mary E. Van Lennep (1821–1844), American missionary, school founder, and memoirist
- Mary E. Williamson (1924–2012), American aviator
- Mary E. Wrinch (1877–1969), English-born Canadian artist
- Mary Eales (?–c. 1718), English food writer
- Mary Earle (1929–2021), Scottish-born New Zealand food technologist
- Mary Earley (1900–1993), American painter
- Mary Early (born 1975), American sculptor
- Mary Earps (born 1993), English professional footballer
- Mary East (c. 1716–1780), English tavern owner
- Mary Eastey (1634–1692), American woman executed in the Salem witch trials
- Mary Eastwood (1930–2015), American lawyer and civil rights advocate
- Mary Eaves (1805/1806–1875), English midwife
- Mary Eberstadt, American essayist, novelist, and nonfiction author
- Mary Eberts (born 1947), Canadian constitutional lawyer
- Mary Eccles, Viscountess Eccles (1912–2003), American-born British book collector and author
- Mary Edmonds (1922–2005), American biochemist
- Mary Edmonson (1832–1853), African-American abolitionist and slave
- Mary Eggers Tendler, American volleyball coach and former player
- Mary Ejercito (1906–2009), Filipino centenarian
- Mary Ekpere-Eta, Nigerian barrister and activist
- Mary Elmes (1908–2002), Irish aid worker
- Mary Emery (1844–1927), American philanthropist
- Mary Emmons (c. 1760–c. 1832), Indian-born American woman who served patriot Theodosia Bartow Prevost
- Mary Emmott (1866–1954), English political activist, suffragist, and baroness
- Mary Endico (born 1954), American watercolor artist
- Mary Engelbreit (born 1952), American artist
- Mary Enright (1880–1966), New Zealand teacher, journalist, and community worker
- Mary Epworth, English singer, songwriter, and composer
- Mary Erler, American literary scholar
- Mary Erskine (1629–1707), Scottish businesswoman and philanthropist
- Mary Essex, pen name of Ursula Bloom (1892–1984), English novelist, biographer, and journalist
- Mary Essiful (born 1993), Ghanaian footballer
- Mary Esslemont (1891–1984), Scottish general practitioner
- Mary Estlin (1820–1902), British abolitionist
- Mary Etherington, English horse breeder and conservationist
- Mary Europe (1885–1947), American pianist, organist, and music educator
- Mary Everard (1942–2022), English golfer
- Mary Ewing-Mulligan, American author, wine educator, and wine critic
- Mary Eyre (1923–2013), British sportswoman and administrator
- Mary F. Foskett (born 1961), Chinese-American New Testament scholar
- Mary F. Nixon-Roulet (1866–1930), American author
- Mary F. Sammons (born 1946), American businesswoman
- Mary F. Scranton (1832–1909), American Methodist Episcopal Church missionary
- Mary Faber de Sanger (c. 1798–?), African slave-trader
- Mary Fabilli (1914–2011), American poet, illustrator, art teacher, and museum curator
- Mary Fage (fl. 1637), English poet
- Mary Faherty (born 1960), Irish judge
- Mary Fahl (born 1958), American singer and actress
- Mary Fairburn (born 1933), English artist and musician
- Mary Fairfax (1922–2017), Polish-born Australian businesswoman and philanthropist
- Mary Fairhurst (1957–2021), American attorney, jurist, and Supreme Court Justice
- Mary Falk (1946–2020), British solicitor and yachtswoman
- Mary Fama (1938–2021), New Zealand applied mathematician
- Mary Fan, American professor of criminal law
- Mary Farkas (1911–1992), American Zen Buddhist teacher
- Mary Farmer (1940–2021), English educator, and weaver of tapestries and rugs
- Mary Farrar (born 1949), American retired victims' advocate
- Mary Farrelly (1866–1943), Australian social worker and diet reformer
- Mary Faulkner, pen name of Kathleen Lindsay (1903–1973), English writer of romance novels
- Mary Fay (born 1998), Canadian curler
- Mary Featherston (born 1943), English-born Australian interior designer
- Mary Fedden (1915–2012), English artist
- Mary Feik (1924–2016), American aviation engineer, mechanic, pilot, instructor, and aircraft restorer
- Mary Felicia Perera, birth name of Sonia Disa (born 1944), Sri Lankan actress, producer, and costume designer
- Mary Fell (born 1947), American poet and academic
- Mary Fels (1863–1953), German-born American philanthropist, Georgist, Zionist, suffragist, economist, author, and journal editor
- Mary Fennelly, Irish camogie player
- Mary Fergusson (1914–1997), British civil engineer
- Mary Fernández, American computer scientist and activist
- Mary Ferrar (1551–1634), English Anglican nun and mystic
- Mary Ferrell (1922–2004), American historian and independent researcher
- Mary Fielding (botanist) (1804–1895), British botanist and botanical illustrator
- Mary Fields (c. 1832–1914), American mail carrier
- Mary Fildes (1789-1792–1876), British reformer and suffragist
- Mary Fillis, 16th-century English Muslim-turned Christian
- Mary Finan (born 1944), Irish businesswoman
- Mary Finch (1508–1557), English courtier
- Mary Findlater (1865–1963), Scottish novelist and poet
- Mary Fink (1916–2000), American civil servant
- Mary Finnin (1906–1992), Australian artist, art teacher, and poet
- Mary Finsterer (born 1962), Australian composer and academic
- Mary Fitt, pseudonym of Kathleen Freeman (classicist) (1897–1959), English novelist and classical scholar
- Mary Fitzbutler Waring (1870–1958), American physician
- Mary Fitzpatrick (photographer) (born 1968), English photographer
- Mary Fitzpayne (born 1928), English artist
- Mary Flahive (born 1948), American professor of mathematics
- Mary Flanagan, American artist, author, educator, and designer
- Mary Flanagan (1943–?), English teenager who disappeared in 1959
- Mary Fleddérus (1886–1977), Dutch social reformer and researcher
- Mary Fleener (born 1951), American alternative comics artist, writer, and musician
- Mary Flood, American owner of Jake (rescue dog)
- Mary Florence Mare, real name of Molly F. Mare (1914–1997), English marine biologist
- Mary Florentine, American professor of psychoacoustics
- Mary Flower, American musician and music educator
- Mary Hannay Foott (1846–1918), Scottish-born Australian poet and editor
- Mary Foote (1872–1968), American painter
- Mary Ford (1924–1977), American guitarist and vocalist
- Mary Forster (1853–1885), English painter
- Mary Forster (Quaker) (c. 1620–1687), English Quaker campaigner
- Mary Forsyth, American-born English rugby union player
- Mary Fortune (c. 1833–1911), Australian writer
- Mary Fowkes (1954–2020), American physician and neuropathologist
- Mary Frank (born 1933), English-born American visual artist
- Mary Franklin (1800–1867), English schoolmistress
- Mary Franklin Smythe, American mother of socialite Helen Smythe Jaffray
- Mary Dillingham Frear (1870–1951), American First Lady of Hawaii, suffragist, and poet
- Mary Frecker, American mechanical engineer
- Mary Frere (1845–1911), English author
- Mary Frey (born 1948), American photographer and educator
- Mary Friday, Australian wheelchair basketball player
- Mary Frierson, real name of Wendy Rene (1947–2014), American soul singer and songwriter
- Mary Fristad, American past president of the Society of Clinical Child and Adolescent Psychology
- Mary Frith (c. 1584–1659), English pickpocket and fence
- Mary Frizzell (1913–1972), Canadian athlete
- Mary Froning (1934–2014), American AAGPBL player
- Mary Fubbister, alternate name of Isobel Gunn (1781–1861), Scottish laborer
- Mary Fulbrook (born 1951), British academic and historian
- Mary Fulkerson (1946–2020), American dance teacher and choreographer
- Mary Fuller (sculptor) (1922–2022), American sculptor and art historian
- Mary Fuzesi (born 1974), Hungarian-born Canadian retired gymnast
- Mary G. Boland, Irish-born American nurse
- Mary G. Burdette (1842–1907), American Baptist teacher, preceptor, writer, and missionary leader
- Mary G. Dietz (born c. 1951), American professor emerita of feminist philosophy
- Mary G. F. Bitterman (born 1944), American historian and former media executive
- Mary Gabrielse (born 1923), Dutch illustrator and former champion swimmer
- Mary Gadbury (c. 1610–after 1650), English merchant and impostor
- Mary Gaitskill (born 1954), American novelist, essayist, and short story writer
- Mary Galea (born 1951), Australian physiotherapist and neuroscientist
- Mary Galinski, American professor of medicine
- Mary Gallagher, American playwright and screenwriter
- Mary Onahan Gallery (1866–1941), American writer, critic, and editor
- Mary Galway (1864–1928), Irish trade unionist and suffragist
- Mary Gambale (born 1988), American former professional tennis player
- Mary Nevan Gannon (1867–1932), American architectural owner
- Mary Garber (1916–2008), American sportswriter
- Mary Garden (1874–1967), Scottish-American opera singer
- Mary Gardner (born 1943), American art historian and museum director; stepmother of businessman Bill Gates
- Mary Garrard (born 1937), American art historian and emerita professor
- Mary Garrett (1854–1915), American suffragist and philanthropist
- Mary Garson (born 1953), English-born Australian organic chemist and academic
- Mary Garson (nun) (1921–2007), Scottish Roman Catholic nun and psychologist
- Mary Gartside (c. 1755–1819), English water colourist and colour theorist
- Mary Gaudron (born 1943), Australian lawyer and judge
- Mary Gaunt (1861–1942), Australian novelist
- Mary Gauthier (born 1962), American folk singer-songwriter and author
- Mary Gawthorpe (1881–1973), English suffragette, socialist, trade unionist, and editor
- Mary Geaney (born 1954), Irish sportswoman
- Mary Geddes (1864–1955), New Zealand businesswoman, welfare worker, and community leader
- Mary Gedye (1834–1876), Australian watercolourist
- Mary Gehr (1910–1997), American painter and printmaker
- Mary Gehring, American plant biologist and epigeneticist
- Mary Gell (1894–1978), British Christian medical missionary
- Mary Gennoy (1951–2004), American activist
- Mary Gentle (born 1956), British science fiction- and fantasy author
- Mary Gergen (1938–2020), American social psychologist
- Mary Gernat (1926–1998), English painter and illustrator
- Mary Getui (born 1959), Kenyan theologian and professor of religious studies
- Mary Ghansah (born 1959), Ghanaian veteran gospel musician and ordained reverend minister
- Mary Gibby (1949–2024), British botanist and professor
- Mary Gideon (born 1989), Nigerian badminton player
- Mary Gilbert (?–1878), European settler of Australia
- Mary Gilchrist (1882–1947), Scottish chess player
- Mary Giles (1944–2018), American fiber artist
- Mary Gillham (1921–2013), Welsh naturalist, university lecturer, and writer
- Mary Gillick (1881–1965), English sculptor and medallist
- Mary Gillies (1800–1870), English children's author; sister of artist Margaret Gillies
- Mary Gillon (1898–2002), Scottish tram conductress
- Mary Gilmore (1865–1962), Australian writer and journalist
- Mary Girling (1827–1886), English religious leader
- Mary Giuliani Stephens (born 1955), American attorney and former mayor
- Mary Glackin, American scientist
- Mary Gladstone (1847–1927), Welsh political secretary, writer, and hostess
- Mary Glasspool (born 1954), American Anglican assistant bishop
- Mary Gleed Tuttiett, real name of Maxwell Gray (1846–1923), English novelist and poet
- Mary Gleim (1845–1914), Irish brothel madam
- Mary Glen-Haig (1918–2014), British Olympic fencer
- Mary Glowrey (1887–1957), Australian Roman Catholic nun and doctor
- Mary Gluckman (1917–1990), British linguist, adult educator, and political activist
- Mary Gnaedinger (1897–1976), American editor
- Mary Godfrey (1913–2007), American artist and art educator
- Mary Goldring (1923–2016), British business journalist and broadcaster
- Mary Goode (born 1979), Irish former field hockey player
- Mary Goodhew, English ballet teacher and former artistic director
- Mary Goore, stage name of Tobias Forge (born 1981), Swedish singer-songwriter, actor, and filmmaker
- Mary Gorman (1881–1915), New Zealand nurse
- Mary Gormley (born c. 1983), Northern Irish model and beauty pageant titleholder
- Mary Gospodarowicz, Canadian oncologist and professor
- Mary Goudie, Baroness Goudie (born 1946), English politician, life peer, humanitarian, and activist
- Mary Gould (silversmith), 18th-century English silversmith
- Mary Goulding (born 1996), New Zealand professional basketball player
- Mary Gow (1851–1929), English watercolourist
- Mary Graeme (1875–1951), English international badminton player
- Mary GrandPré (born 1954), American illustrator
- Mary Grannan (1900–1975), Canadian children's writer and radio personality
- Mary Graustein (1884–1972), American mathematician and university professor
- Mary Greaves (1907–1983), British civil servant and disability rights campaigner
- Mary Coombs Greenleaf (1800–1857), American Presbyterian missionary
- Mary Grew (1813–1896), American abolitionist and suffragist
- Mary Grierson (1912–2012), Welsh-born Scottish botanical artist and illustrator
- Mary Grieve (1906–1998), Scottish magazine editor and journalist
- Mary Grigoriadis (born 1942), American artist
- Mary Grigson (born 1971), Australian cross-country mountain biker
- Mary Grimes (charity worker) (1861–1921), British librarian and promoter of emigration
- Mary Grimstone (1796–1869), British poet, novelist, and socialist feminist
- Mary Guinan (born 1939), American doctor and dean
- Mary Guiney (1901–2004), Irish businesswoman
- Mary Willa Gummer, real name of Mamie Gummer (born 1983), American actress
- Mary Gunn (1899–1989), South African librarian and biographer
- Mary Gunter (1586–1622), English Catholic ward and servant who converted to Protestantism
- Mary Gurney (1836–1917), British educationist
- Mary Gwenyth Lusby, birth name of Gwen Fleming (1916–2011), Australian medical doctor
- Mary H. Donlon (1893–1977), American judge
- Mary H.K. Choi, Korean American author, editor, and television- and print journalist
- Mary H. Murguia (born 1960), American lawyer and jurist
- Mary Haas (1910–1996), American linguist
- Mary Habicht (born 1943), American former tennis player
- Mary Habington, English recusant
- Mary Habsch (1931–2023), Belgian painter and printmaker
- Mary Hadler (1902–1971), American songwriter
- Mary Hagedorn (born 1954), American marine biologist
- Mary Hagen (1876–1944), German soprano
- Mary Haizlip (1910–1997), American aviator
- Mary Hallaren (1907–2005), American soldier
- Mary Hallock-Greenewalt (1871–1950), American inventor and pianist
- Mary Halton (1878–1948), American pathologist, gynecologist, obstetrician, women's health activist, and suffragist
- Mary Halvorson (born 1980), American avant-garde jazz composer and guitarist
- Mary Hames (1827–1919), New Zealand dressmaker, farmer, and domestic servant
- Mary Hamman (1907–1984), American writer and editor
- Mary Hammond, English vocal coach
- Mary Hampson (1868–1944), Australian textile artist
- Mary Hampton, English folk singer, songwriter, accordionist, and guitarist
- Mary Handen, Papua New Guinean businesswoman and accountant
- Mary Hanna (born 1954), Australian equestrian
- Mary Esther Harding (1888–1971), British-American Jungian analyst
- Mary Hardwick (1913–2001), English tennis player
- Mary Harfield (1879–1970), Australian-British archaeologist and nurse
- Mary Harley (1865–1962), American physician
- Mary Harlow (born 1956), English archaeologist and classical scholar
- Mary Harriman Rumsey (1881–1934), American social activist and government official
- Mary Dormer Harris (1867–1936), British local historian, translator and suffragist
- Mary Harron (born 1953), Canadian film director
- Mary Hartwell (1747–1846), American woman who played a prominent role in the American Revolutionary War
- Mary Harwood (c. 1702–c. 1753), American daughter of Mary Walcott
- Mary Hatten, American professor of neuroscience
- Mary Eliza Haweis (1848–1898), British author, scholar of Geoffrey Chaucer, illustrator, and painter
- Mary Hawkesworth (born 1952), American professor of political science and women's- and gender studies
- Mary Hawn, American surgeon and professor
- Mary Hawton (1924–1981), Australian tennis player
- Mary Hayden (1862–1942), Irish historian, Irish-language activist, and campaigner for women's causes
- Mary Hayhoe, Australian American psychologist who researches vision
- Mary Hayley (1728–1808), English businesswoman
- Mary Hayllar (1862–1950), English artist
- Mary Hays (1759–1843), English writer and feminist
- Mary Hays (American Revolutionary War) (1754–1832), American Revolutionary War soldier
- Mary Hearn (1891–1969), Irish gynaecologist
- Mary Hearne (fl. 1718), English novelist
- Mary Hecht (1931–2013), American-born Canadian sculptor
- Mary Heebner (born 1951), American artist and author
- Mary Heeley (1911–2002), English tennis player
- Mary Hefferan (1873–1948), American bacteriologist and community leader
- Mary Hegarty, Irish opera soprano singer
- Mary Hegarty (scientist), Irish-American psychologist and professor
- Mary Hegeler Carus (1861–1936), American engineer, editor, and entrepreneur
- Mary Heilmann (born 1940), American painter
- Mary Heimann, American historian and professor
- Mary Heisig (1913–1966), American artist
- Mary Hemingway Rees (1887–1954), English psychiatrist
- Mary Henle (1913–2007), American psychologist
- Mary Hennell (1802–1843), British reforming writer
- Mary Hepburn (born 1949), Scottish obstetrician and gynaecologist
- Mary Heron (fl. 1786–1792), English writer
- Mary Herring (1895–1981), Australian medical practitioner and community worker
- Mary Hesse (1924–2016), English philosopher and professor of science
- Mary Hewins (1914–1986), British working woman
- Mary Higgs (1854–1937), British writer and social reformer
- Mary Higham (1819–1883), Australian businesswoman
- Mary Hilson, English researcher and academic
- Mary Hoare (1744–1820), English painter
- Mary Hobart (1851–c. 1930), American physician
- Mary Hobhouse (1864–1901), Irish poet and novelist
- Mary Hobry (?–1688), English midwife executed for murder
- Mary Hobson (1926–2020), English writer, poet, and translator
- Mary Hobson (curler), American curler
- Mary Hockaday (born 1962), British journalist and academic administrator
- Mary Hockaday (physicist) (born 1957), American physicist
- Mary Hocking (1921–2014), British writer
- Mary Hodgson (?–1719), English soprano
- Mary Hodson (born 1946), English middle-distance runner
- Mary Hoffman (born 1945), British writer and critic
- Mary Hogan (?–1954), American murder victim
- Mary Hogarth (1819–1837), Scottish sister-in-law of English novelist Charles Dickens
- Mary Holbrook (1939–2019), British cheesemaker and curator
- Mary Holda (1915–2016), American AAGPBL player
- Mary Hollingsworth (born 1950), British historian
- Mary Holloway (1917–?), English athlete
- Mary Homer (born 1958), British businesswoman
- Mary Homfray (?–1758), Welsh mother of English industrialist Francis Homfray
- Mary Hood (born 1946), American fiction writer
- Mary Hood (businesswoman) (c. 1822–1902), New Zealand businesswoman
- Mary Hooper (19th-century author) (1829–1904), English writer
- Mary Hopkin (born 1950), Welsh singer
- Mary Hopper (born 1951), American choral conductor and music minister
- Mary Horgan, Irish physician of infectious diseases
- Mary Horner Lyell (1808–1873), English conchologist and geologist
- Mary Hottinger (1893–1978), Scottish translator and editor
- Mary Houghton, American banker and company founder
- Mary Howarth (c. 1858–after 1934), British journalist and newspaper editor
- Mary Howell (1932–1998), American physician, psychologist, lawyer, mentor, musician, and mother
- Mary Howgill (1623–before 1681), English Quaker
- Mary Howitt (1799–1888), English poet and author
- Mary Hume-Rothery (1824–1885), British writer and campaigner for medical reform
- Mary Huntoon (1896–1970), American artist and art therapist
- Mary Hutson (1884–1982), American civil engineer
- Mary Hyde (1779–1864), English-born Australian businesswoman and criminal
- Mary Hynes, Canadian radio- and television broadcaster
- Mary Ibberson (1892–1979), British musician and teacher
- Mary Ihedioha (born 1962), Nigerian handball player
- Mary Impey (1749–1818), English natural historian and patron of the arts
- Mary Imrie (1918–1988), Canadian architect
- Mary Ingalls (1865–1928), American older sister of author Laura Ingalls Wilder
- Mary Ingraham (1901–1982), Bahamian suffragist
- Mary Inman (1894–1985), American political activist and writer
- Mary Irvine (born 1956), Irish judge
- Mary Irvine (engineer) (1919–2001), British engineer
- Mary Isenhour, American political strategist, campaign manager, and government official
- Mary Ito, Canadian television- and radio personality
- Mary Ivins (1944–2007), American newspaper columnist, author, and political commentator
- Mary J. Blige (born 1971), American singer and actress
- Mary J. Farnham (1833–1913), English-born American missionary and temperance advocate
- Mary J. Gregor (1928–1994), American author, translator, and professor
- Mary J. Hickman, Irish-born American professor and scholar
- Mary J. Hornaday (1906–1982), American journalist
- Mary J. Newill (1860–1947), English painter, embroiderer, teacher, book illustrator, and stained glass designer
- Mary J. Safford (1834–1891), American nurse, physician, educator, and humanitarian
- Mary J. Schleppegrell (born 1950), American applied linguist and professor of education
- Mary J. Schoelen, American senior judge
- Mary J. Serrano (c. 1840–1923), Irish-born American translator, writer, and poet
- Mary Jacobus (1957–2009), American journalist
- Mary Jacobus (literary scholar) (born 1944), British literary scholar
- Mary Clubwala Jadhav (1909–1975), Indian philanthropist
- Mary Jarred (1899–1993), English opera singer
- Mary Jefferson Eppes (1778–1804), daughter of American president Thomas Jefferson
- Mary Jemison (1743–1833), British frontierswoman
- Mary Jerram (born 1945), New Zealand-born Australian coroner, magistrate, solicitor, and teacher
- Mary Jesse (born 1964), American technology- and media pioneer
- Mary Jewels (1886–1977), English painter
- Mary Jiménez, Mexican ranchera singer
- Mary Joanne Tarola, birth name of Linda Douglas (1928–2017), American model and actress
- Mary Johnstone, birth name of Moura Lympany (1916–2005), English concert pianist
- Mary Jolliffe (1923–2014), Canadian theatre- and performing arts publicist
- Mary Jowett, New Zealand architect
- Mary Joyce, English love interest of poet John Clare
- Mary Joynson (1924–2013), British childcare worker
- Mary K. Buck (1849–1901), Bohemian-born American author
- Mary K. Estes, American virologist and professor
- Mary K. Firestone, American professor of soil microbiology
- Mary K. Gaillard (1939–2025), American theoretical physicist
- Mary K. Hawes, American computer scientist
- Mary K. Okheena (born 1957), Inuvialuit graphic artist
- Mary K. Pershall, Australian children's author
- Mary K. Rothbart (born 1940), American professor emerita of psychology
- Mary K. Trigg, American associate professor of women's and gender studies
- Mary K. Trotter (1859–1925), American artist
- Mary Kaestner (1882–?), American opera singer
- Mary Kaiser (1948–2011), American chemist
- Mary Kalantzis (born 1949), Australian author and academic
- Mary Kaldor (born 1946), British academic and professor
- Mary Kalergis (born 1951), American author, photographer, and interviewer
- Mary Kalin Arroyo (born 1944), New Zealand-born Chilean botanist and professor of biology
- Mary Kalsrap, Vanuatuan entrepreneur
- Mary Kane (born 1962), American attorney
- Mary Kardash (1913–1994), Canadian socialist and feminist activist
- Mary Karr (born 1955), American poet, essayist, and memoirist
- Mary Katrantzou (born 1983), Greek fashion designer
- Mary Kay (landscape photographer), Greek landscape photographer
- Mary Kaye (1924–2007), American guitarist and performer
- Mary Kearney, American biologist
- Mary Keating Hill (1863–1929), Welsh suffragette and labour campaigner.
- Mary Keegan (born 1953), British retired accountant and civil servant
- Mary Lucas Keene (1885–1977), British professor of anatomy
- Mary Kekedo (c. 1919–1993), Papuan educator
- Mary Eliza Kennard (1850–1936), English novelist and writer of non-fiction
- Mary Kenny (born 1944), Irish journalist, broadcaster, and playwright
- Mary Kerr (1905–1998), Scottish bondager and domestic servant
- Mary Kershaw, American museum curator and director
- Mary Kessell (1914–1977), English figurative painter, illustrator, designer, and war artist
- Mary Kiani, Scottish singer
- Mary Kilbreth (1869–1957), American anti-suffragist
- Mary Killen, Northern Irish etiquette expert
- Mary Killman (born 1991), American synchronized swimmer
- Mary Kinder (1909–1981), American gun moll; girlfriend of gangster Harry Pierpont and associate of gangster John Dillinger
- Mary Kingsley (1862–1900), English ethnographer, writer, and explorer
- Mary Kingston (born 1970), Irish children's television presenter
- Mary Kini, Papua New Guinean anti-war activist
- Mary Kinnan (1763–1848), American woman held captive by Shawnee
- Mary Kinuthia (born 1990), Kenyan footballer
- Mary Kinzie (born 1944), American poet and critic
- Mary Kirchoff, American author of fantasy and young adult novels
- Mary Kirkland, Canadian set decorator
- Mary Kirkpatrick (c. 1863–1943), New South Wales midwife
- Mary Kirkwood (1904–1995), American artist and professor
- Mary Kisler, New Zealand curator, author, art historian, and art commentator
- Mary Kissel, American former journalist
- Mary Kitagawa (born 1935), Canadian educator
- Mary Kittamaquund (c. 1634–c. 1654), Piscataway woman who helped establish the Maryland colony
- Mary Klass (born 1935), Singaporean former sprinter
- Mary Klicka (1921–2007), Canadian-American registered dietitian and food technologist
- Mary Knatchbull (1610–1696), English Roman Catholic abbess
- Mary Knisely (born 1959), American retired middle- and long-distance runner
- Mary Knowling (1923–2013), South African medical doctor
- Mary Knowlton (?–2016), American woman whom a police officer accidentally shot and killed
- Mary Koboldt (born 1964), American former field hockey player
- Mary Koga (1920–2001), Japanese-American photographer and social worker
- Mary Kok (born 1940), Dutch swimmer
- Mary Kollock (1832–1911), American landscape painter
- Mary Kom (born 1982), Indian Olympic boxer
- Mary Koncel, American poet
- Mary Kostakidis (born 1954), Australian journalist and political commentator
- Mary Krebs-Brenning (1851–1900), German pianist
- Mary Krueger, American lieutenant general and physician
- Mary L. Boas (1917–2010), American mathematician, physics professor, and author
- Mary L. Cleave (1947–2023), American engineer and NASA astronaut
- Mary L. Coloe (born 1949), Australian Roman Catholic nun and New Testament biblical scholar
- Mary L. Disis, American physician-oncologist and medical journal editor
- Mary L. Doe (1836–1913), American suffragist, temperance reformer, teacher, and author
- Mary L. Droser, American paleontologist
- Mary L. Dudziak (born 1956), American legal theorist, civil rights historian, educator, and expert on leading foreign policy and international relations
- Mary L. Geffs (1854–1939), American author, speaker, and suffragist
- Mary L. Kraft, American professor of chemical- and biological engineering
- Mary L. Langworthy (1872–1949), American dramatic coach, writer, lecturer, clubwoman, and civic leader
- Mary L. Mallett (1860–1944), American temperance advocate
- Mary L. Mandich, American retired physical chemistry researcher
- Mary L. Marazita, American geneticist and professor of dental medicine
- Mary L. McMaster, American oncologist and clinical trialist
- Mary L. Mikva, American jurist and judge
- Mary L. Moreland (1859–1918), American minister, teacher, and writer
- Mary L. Pendered (1858–1940), English novelist
- Mary L. Proctor (born 1960), American artist
- Mary La Chapelle (born 1955), American short story writer
- Mary Lacity (born 1963), American professor, computer scientist, and researcher
- Mary Lacy (c. 1740–1801), British sailor, shipwright, and memoirist
- Mary Lacy, American district attorney in the Killing of JonBenét Ramsey
- Mary Laffoy (born 1945), Irish judge
- Mary Lakeland (?–1645), English woman executed for witchcraft
- Mary Lamb (1764–1847), English writer
- Mary Landers (1905–1990), American mathematician
- Mary Landry, American disaster-management official and retired rear admiral of the U.S. Coast Guard
- Mary Lane (born 1987), American non-fiction writer, journalist, and art historian
- Mary Langan (born 1948), Irish Roman Catholic nun
- Mary Lanwi (born 1921), Marshallese educator, activist, and promotor of traditional handicrafts
- Mary Larteh, Liberian tribal chief
- Mary Lascaris, Australian past member of children's musical group Hi-5 (Australian group)
- Mary Laschinger (born c. 1959), American former business executive
- Mary Lasker (1900–1994), American health activist and philanthropist
- Mary Latter (1725–1777), English poet, essayist, and playwright
- Mary Lattimore (born 1980), American harpist
- Mary Laughren, Australian linguist
- Mary Lavin (1912–1996), American-born Irish short story writer and novelist
- Mary Lawler (1944–1998), American speed skater
- Mary Lawrance (1781–1845), English botanical illustrator
- Mary Lawrenson (1850–1943), English activist and educationalist
- Mary Leacy (born 1986), Irish sportsperson
- Mary Leadbeater (1758–1826), Irish Quaker author and diarist
- Mary Leader (born 1948), American poet and lawyer
- Mary Leaf (1925–2004), Akwesasne Mohawk basket maker
- Mary Leakey (1913–1996), British paleoanthropologist
- Mary Leapor (1722–1746), English poet
- Mary Greenleaf Clement Leavitt (1830–1912), American educator, suffragist, and women's rights activist
- Mary Lee (1921–2022), Scottish singer
- Mary Lefkowitz (born 1935), American classical scholar and writer
- Mary Leigh (1885–1978), English political activist and suffragette
- Mary Leng, British philosopher and professor of mathematics and science
- Mary Lenig, American contestant on The Amazing Race (American TV series)
- Mary Leo (1895–1989), New Zealand religious sister
- Mary Leonard (c. 1845–1912), American attorney and accused murderer
- Mary Leonard (pediatrician), American pediatric nephrologist, epidemiologist, and professor
- Mary lePage (1879–1962), American Hindu
- Mary Le Ravin (1905–1992), African American visionary artist and ordained minister
- Mary Lerner (1882–1938), American writer
- Mary LeSawyer (1917–2004), American opera singer of Ukrainian descent
- Mary Lescher (1846–1927), British Mother Superior, school founder, and college head
- Mary Leta Dorothy Slaton, birth name of Dorothy Lamour (1914–1996), American actress and singer
- Mary Leue, American educator and community activist
- Mary Leunig (born 1950), Australian visual artist
- Mary Levison (1923–2011), British leader of the Church of Scotland
- Mary Liddell (1877–1967), Irish-born Australian journalist and feminist
- Mary Lidstrom (born 1951), American professor of microbiology
- Mary Kini Lifu (born 1994), Solomon Islander weightlifter
- Mary Lightfoot (1889–1970), American painter and printmaker
- Mary Lillian Ellison, real name of The Fabulous Moolah (1923–2007), American professional wrestler, promoter, and trainer
- Mary Lim (born 1948), Bruneian businesswoman and educator
- Mary Lindell (1895–1987), English nurse
- Mary Lindemann (born 1949), American historian and professor emerita of history
- Mary Lindsey (fl. 1697–1713), British singer
- Mary Lines (1893–1978), British athlete
- Mary Linley (1758–1787), English musician
- Mary Linskill (1840–1891), English novelist, short-story writer, and poet
- Mary Linwood (1755–1845), English needle woman and school mistress
- Mary Littlejohn (1903–1988), Canadian figure skater
- Mary Livermore (1820–1905), American journalist, abolitionist, and advocate of women's rights
- Mary Lobb (1878–1939), English Land Army volunteer; life companion of May Morris
- Mary Lobel (1900–1993), British historian
- Mary Lobo (born 1922/1923), Indian-born Singaporean social worker, clubwoman, and women's rights activist
- Mary Lokko, Ghanaian activist
- Mary Longman (born 1964), Canadian artist
- Mary Loomis, American Union nurse during the American Civil War
- Mary Looney (1886–1961), New Zealand civilian- and wartime nurse
- Mary Lorson, American writer, musician, and composer
- Mary Losseff (1907–1972), British singer and actress
- Mary Loveless (1899–1991), American physician and immunologist
- Mary Lowndes (1857–1929), English stained-glass artist and suffragist
- Mary Loyola (1845–1930), English Roman Catholic nun and author
- Mary Luba (born 1993), American NWSL player
- Mary Lubawski (born 1965), Canadian former breaststroke swimmer
- Mary Lucas (1882–1952), English composer and pianist
- Mary Lucia (born 1970), American on-air radio personality
- Mary Lucier (born 1944), American visual artist and pioneer in video art
- Mary Luckhurst, British writer, academic, and theatre director
- Mary Lum (artist) (born 1951), American visual artist
- Mary Lumpkin (1832–1905), American philanthropist and slave
- Mary Lutyens (1908–1999), English author
- Mary Lyschinska (1849–1937), Scottish-Polish Kindergarten teacher and writer
- Mary M. Frasier (1938–2005), African American educator
- Mary M. Haskell (1869–1953), American congregationalist missionary in Bulgaria
- Mary M. Horowitz, American oncologist
- Mary M. Lepper (1929/1930–1984), American political scientist and scholar of public administration
- Mary M. Lisi (born 1950), American inactive district judge
- Mary M. McDermott, American professor of medicine
- Mary M. Ourisman (born 1946), American political consultant
- Mary M. Purser (1913–1986), American painter
- Mary M. Rowland (born 1961), American district judge
- Mary M. Schroeder (born 1940), American attorney, jurist, and circuit judge
- Mary Ma (1952/1953–2019), Chinese businesswoman and investor
- Mary MacArthur (1904–1959), Canadian scientist
- Mary Macarthur (1880–1921), Scottish suffragist and trades unionist
- Mary Macaulay (1865–1944), American telegraph operator and labor union official
- Mary MacCarthy (1882–1953), English writer
- Mary MacGregor (born 1948), American singer
- Mary MacIsaac (1893–2006), Canadian supercentenarian
- Mary Mackall Gwinn, birth name of Mamie Gwinn Hodder (1860–1940), American educator
- Mary Mackellar (1834–1890), Scottish poet, writer, and translator
- Mary Macken-Horarik, Australian linguist
- Mary Mackenzie (mezzo-soprano), American classical mezzo-soprano and voice teacher
- Mary Mackey (born 1945), American novelist, poet, and academic
- Mary Mackie (born early 1940s), English writer
- Mary MacKillop (1842–1909), Australian Roman Catholic nun and educator
- Mary MacLane (1881–c. 1929), Canadian-born American writer
- Mary MacMakin (born 1929/1930), American aid worker
- Mary Macmaster (born 1955), Scottish harpist and singer
- Mary MacPherson (1821–1898), Scottish Gaelic poet
- Mary Macpherson, British socialist activist
- Mary Macqueen (1912–1994), Australian artist
- Mary Madeiras, American television soap opera director
- Mary Madeline Bonfils, birth name of May Bonfils Stanton (1883–1962), American heiress and philanthropist
- Mary Mageau (1934–2020), American-born Australian writer, harpsichordist, and composer
- Mary Main (1943–2023), American psychologist
- Mary Mairs-Chapot (born 1944), American equestrian
- Mary Maker, South Sudanese refugee, ambassador, and education advocate
- Mary Malahlela (1916–1981), South African physician
- Mary Malcolm (1918–2010), British radio- and television presenter and producer
- Mary Malcolmson, Canadian Girl Guide company founder
- Mary Mallen (fl. 2013–2016), American singer and actress
- Mary Mallon (1869–1938), Irish-born American cook
- Mary Mallon (academic) (1957–2006), British-New Zealand management academic and professor
- Mary Mancini, American political activist and former candidate
- Mary Manhein, American forensic anthropologist
- Mary Many Days Robidoux (c. 1805–1884), Métis daughter of fur trader Joseph Robidoux IV
- Mary Mapes (born 1956), American journalist, former television news producer, and author
- Mary Marcy (1877–1922), American socialist author, pamphleteer, poet, and magazine editor
- Mary Marechal, Belgian tennis player
- Mary Margesson, British daughter of politician David Margesson, 1st Viscount Margesson
- Mary Marguerite Leneen Kavanagh, birth name of Leneen Forde (born 1935), Canadian retired solicitor
- Mary Marlowe Sommer, American judge and lawyer
- Mary Marques (1896–2008), Portuguese supercentenarian
- Mary Marquis (born 1935), Scottish former television interviewer and presenter
- Mary Marre (1920–2005), British voluntary worker and public servant
- Mary Marr Platt, real name of Polly Platt (1939–2011), American film producer, production designer, and screenwriter
- Mary Marzke (?–2020), American anthropologist
- Mary Mason (born 1954), English singer
- Mary Massey (1915–1974), American historian
- Mary Masters (1694?–1759?), English poet and letter-writer
- Mary Matalin (born 1953), American political consultant
- Mary Matheson (1896–1969), Australian psychologist
- Mary Mathew (1724–1777), Irish diarist
- Mary Mattatall (born 1960), Canadian curler and coach
- Mary Mattingly (born 1978), American visual artist
- Mary Matz (1931–2013), American minister and theologian
- Mary Maverick (1818–1898), American pioneer and author of memoirs
- Mary Mayhew (born 1965), American lobbyist
- Mary Mayo (1924–1985), American singer
- Mary Mazur, American producer
- Mary Mazzio, American documentary filmmaker, attorney, and former Olympic rower
- Mary Mazzio-Manson (born 1998), American rower
- Mary Mbewe, Zambian journalist
- Mary McAnally (1945–2016), English television producer and tennis player
- Mary McAteer (born 2004), Welsh professional footballer
- Mary McBride (musician), American pop rock singer
- Mary McCagg (born 1967), American rower
- Mary McCallum (born 1961), Zambian-born New Zealand publisher, author, and journalist
- Mary McCammon (1927–2008), British mathematician and professor
- Mary McCann (1890–1966), Irish-born American woman who rescued boat passengers
- Mary McCartney (born 1969), English photographer, documentary filmmaker, cookbook author, and activist
- Mary McCarty (baseball) (1931–2009), American AAGPBL player
- Mary McCaslin (1946–2022), American folk singer
- Mary McClain, real name of Diamond Teeth Mary (1902–2000), American blues- and gospel singer and vaudeville entertainer
- Mary McCleary (born 1951), American artist
- Mary McClintock Fulkerson (born 1950), American Protestant theologian, scholar, and professor emerita
- Mary McConkey (1916–1981), Canadian competitive swimmer
- Mary McConneloug (born 1971), American racing cyclist
- Mary McCormic (1889–1981), American operatic soprano and professor of opera
- Mary McCoy (1820s–1899), Irish nurse
- Mary McCreary, American singer, pianist, and composer
- Mary McCrossan (1865–1934), English painter
- Mary McDermott (fl. 1832), Irish poet
- Mary McDonagh (1849–?), Irish poet
- Mary McEldowney-Evanson (1921–2019), American environmentalist
- Mary McEvoy (artist) (1870–1941), English artist
- Mary McFadden (1938–2024), American art collector, editor, fashion designer, and writer
- Mary Cornwell McFarland (1868–1943), American daughter of Presbyterian missionary Samuel G. McFarland
- Mary McGeachy (1901–1991), Scottish-Canadian diplomat and international civil servant
- Mary McGrory (1918–2004), American journalist and columnist
- Mary McGuckian (born 1963), Northern Irish film director
- Mary McHenry (1933–2021), American academic
- Mary McIlquham (1901–?), English tennis player
- Mary McLean (1866–1949), New Zealand school principal
- Mary McLoughlin (1901–1956), Irish woman who served in the 1916 Easter Rising
- Mary McMullen (1920–1986), American mystery writer
- Mary McMurtrie (1902–2003), Scottish botanical artist and horticulturalist
- Mary McNamara (born 1963), American journalist and television critic
- Mary McNeill, birth name of Sidney McCall (1865–1954), American novelist and poet
- Mary McNeill (doctor) (1874–1928), Scottish suffragist and doctor
- Mary McNish (c. 1926–2013), Australian teacher and activist
- Mary McPartlan (1955–2020), Irish singer, musician, music director, and producer
- Mary McQueen (1860–1945), New Zealand Presbyterian deaconess, orphanage matron, and social worker
- Mary McShain (1907–1998), Irish-American landowner and benefactor
- Mary McVeigh (born 1981), American retired soccer player
- Mary Meader (1916–2008), American aerial photographer and explorer
- Mary Medd (1907–2005), English architect
- Mary Meeke, alternate name of Elizabeth Meeke (1761–c. 1826), English author, translator, and children's writer
- Mary Meeker (born 1959), American venture capitalist and former security analyst
- Mary Meerson (1902–1993), French ballet dancer, model, and archivist
- Mary Meigs (1917–2002), American-born Canadian painter and writer
- Mary Meijer-van der Sluis (1917–1994), Dutch fencer and singer
- Mary Meilak (1905–1975), Maltese poet
- Mary Melfi (born 1951), Italian Canadian writer
- Mary Melone (born 1964), Italian Roman Catholic nun and theologian
- Mary Menéndez (1941–1989), American murder victim
- Mary Mensah (born 1963), Ghanaian sprinter
- Mary Meriam (born 1955), American poet and editor
- Mary Meyers (1946–2024), American speed skater
- Mary Mgonja, Tanzanian agricultural scientist and plant breeder
- Mary Middlemore (?–1618), English courtier
- Mary Middleton (1870–1911), Scottish political activist
- Mary Midgley (1919–2018), English philosopher
- Mary Midnight, a pen name of Christopher Smart (1722–1771), English poet
- Mary Mihelakos, Australian music promoter and journalist
- Mary Millar (1936–1998), English singer and actress
- Mary Millben (born 1982), American singer
- Mary Milligan (1935–2011), American Roman Catholic theologian and university administrator
- Mary Milne, Canadian singer-songwriter
- Mary Milne (athlete) (1914–2014), English athlete
- Mary Milner (19th-century writer) (1797–1863), English writer and editor
- Mary Mims (1882–1967), American educator, sociologist, agriculture sociologist, and extension agent
- Mary Miranda, American contestant on The Voice (American TV series) season 4
- Mary Miss (born 1944), American artist and designer
- Mary Moberly (1853–1940), British educator
- Mary Moffat (1795–1871), English missionary
- Mary Mohler (born 1984), American former competition swimmer
- Mary Mollineux (1651–1696), English Quaker poet
- Mary Molloy (1880–1954), American academic
- Mary Molony (1878–1921), Irish suffragette campaigner
- Mary Molson (1846–1881), American suffragist, lecturer, and orator
- Mary Monck (1677?–1715), Irish poet
- Mary Money (?–1905), English murder victim
- Mary Montgomerie Lamb, birth name of Violet Fane (1843–1905), English poet, writer, and ambassadress
- Mary Montgomery (1956–2017), American competition swimmer
- Mary Moodley (1913–1979), South African trade unionist and anti-apartheid activist
- Mary Moorman (born 1932), American woman who chanced to photograph U.S. President John F. Kennedy after his assassination
- Mary Caroline Moorman (1905–1994), English historian and biographer
- Mary Moraa (born 2000), Kenyan athlete
- Mary Morain (1911–1999), American therapist, social reformer, and secular humanist
- Mary More (1732–1807), English Roman Catholic nun
- Mary Moreau (born 1955/1956), Canadian jurist and former judge
- Mary Morello (1923–2026), American activist
- Mary Morez (1946–2004), American Navajo painter
- Mary Morrissy (born 1957), Irish novelist and short story writer
- Mary Morten, American activist
- Mary Mortimer (1816–1877), English-born American educator
- Mary Moseley (1878–1961), Bahamian newspaper editor
- Mary Moser (1744–1819), English painter
- Mary Moss (1864–1914), American author and literary critic
- Mary Mossell Griffin (1882–1968), American writer, clubwoman, and suffragist
- Mary Mostert (1929–2016), American Mormon political writer and activist
- Mary Mothersill (1923–2008), Canadian philosopher
- Mary Moylan (1936–1995), American nurse-midwife and political activist
- Mary Muir (1881–1962), New Zealand nurse
- Mary Mullarkey (1943–2021), American Supreme Court chief justice
- Mary Mullen (?–1962), American murder victim
- Mary Müller (1820–1901), New Zealand campaigner for women's suffrage- and rights
- Mary Mulry, American demographic statistician
- Mary Mulvihill (1959–2015), Irish scientist, radio television presenter, author, and educator
- Mary Murdoch (1864–1916), Scottish physician and suffragist
- Mary Murtfeldt (1839–1913), American entomologist, botanist, botanical collector, writer, and editor
- Mary Musani (born 1944), Ugandan hurdler
- Mary Musgrove (c. 1700–1765), American leading figure in early Georgia history
- Mary Musoke, Ugandan table tennis player
- Mary Mwakapila (born 1995), Zambian footballer
- Mary Myers (1849–1932), American balloonist and inventor
- Mary N. Frampton (1930–2006), American photographer and environmentalist
- Mary N. Meeker (1921–2003), American educational psychologist and entrepreneur
- Mary N. Torrey (1910–1998), American mathematical statistician and quality control specialist
- Mary Nakhumicha Zakayo (born 1979), Kenyan Paralympic track athlete
- Mary Nalule (born 1997), Ugandan cricketer
- Mary Naylor (born 1926), British-American retired variety entertainer
- Mary Neal (1860–1944), English social worker, suffragette, and English folk dance collector
- Mary Nerney (1938–2013), American women's rights activist
- Mary Nesbitt (1742/1743–1825), English upper class socialite and courtesan
- Mary Nesbitt Wisham (1925–2013), American AAGPBL player
- Mary Neumayr (born 1964), American government official
- Mary Newbery Sturrock (1892–1985), Scottish artist
- Mary Newcomb (artist) (1922–2008), British artist
- Mary Newport (1954/1955–?), American author, public speaker, and advocate
- Mary Ney (born 1949), British public servant
- Mary Ngalo (?–1973), South African anti-apartheid activist who also fought for women's rights
- Mary Nguyen (born 1976), American journalist and attorney
- Mary Nicolay (1850–1939), British Australian nurse and hospital matron
- Mary Nightingale (born 1963), English journalist and television presenter
- Mary Ní Mháille (?–1525), Irish noblewoman
- Mary Nissenson (1952–2017), American television journalist, entrepreneur, social activist, and university instructor
- Mary Njoki (born 1989), Kenyan businesswoman, executive, and entrepreneur
- Mary Noble (1911–2002), Scottish seed pathologist
- Mary Noe, American educator, writer, and lecturer
- Mary Nomura (1925–2026), Japanese-American singer
- Mary Norris (1932–2017), Irish victim of human rights abuse
- Mary Norris (copy editor) (born 1952), American author, writer, and copy editor
- Mary Northridge, American epidemiologist and former editor-in-chief
- Mary Norwak (1929–2010), English food writer
- Mary Norwood (tennis) (born 1966), American former professional tennis player
- Mary Nótár (born 1985), Hungarian singer
- Mary Nourse (1880–1971), American educator and writer
- Mary Novik, Canadian novelist
- Mary Nwachukwu (born 1969), Nigerian handball player
- Mary Nyburg (1918–2006), American potter and teacher
- Mary Nzimiro (1898–1993), Nigerian businesswoman and activist
- Mary O. Furner, American historian
- Mary Obering (1937–2022), American painter
- Mary Odili (born 1952), Nigerian judge
- Mary of Bethezuba, 1st-century Jewish cannibal
- Mary of Saint Peter (1816–1848), French Discalced Carmelite nun
- Mary of Shaftesbury, 12th-century English Roman Catholic abbess
- Mary of St. Jerome Tourneux (1808–1896), French Roman Catholic nun
- Mary of the Divine Heart (1863–1899), German noblewoman and Roman Catholic nun
- Mary of the Passion (1839–1904), French Roman Catholic nun and missionary
- Mary Okwakol (born 1951), Ugandan university professor, academic administrator, zoologist, and community leader
- Mary Olmsted (1919–2018), American ambassador and economist
- Mary Olstine Graham (1842–1902), American educator in Argentina
- Mary Onyali-Omagbemi (born 1968), Nigerian former sprinter
- Mary Opeloge (born 1992), Samoan weightlifter
- Mary Oppen (1908–1990), American activist, artist, photographer, poet, and writer
- Mary Orr (1910–2006), American author
- Mary Orr (figure skater) (born 1996), Canadian pair skater
- Mary Orwen (1913–2005), American artist
- Mary Oshlag (1942–2021), American bridge player
- Mary Osijo (born 1996), Nigerian weightlifter
- Mary Ostergren (born 1960), American biathlete
- Mary Otto, American medical journalist
- Mary Ewing Outerbridge (1852–1886), American woman who introduced tennis to her country
- Mary Overlie (1946–2020), American choreographer, dancer, theater artist, professor, author, and the originator of the Six Viewpoints technique for theater and dance
- Mary Oxlie (fl. 1616), Scottish- or Northumbrian poet
- Mary Oyama Mittwer (1907–1994), Japanese American journalist and community organizer
- Mary O'Donnell (born 1954), Irish novelist, poet, journalist, broadcaster, and teacher
- Mary O'Donoghue (born 1975), Irish fiction writer, poet, and translator
- Mary O'Grady, American editor and columnist
- Mary O'Hagan (1823–1876), Irish Roman Catholic abbess
- Mary O'Kane (born 1954), Australian scientist and engineer
- Mary O'Kelly de Galway (1905–1999), Irish Belgian resistance operative
- Mary O'Riordan, American molecular biologist, professor, and dean
- Mary O'Rourke (barrister), Irish barrister
- Mary O'Rourke (singer) (1913–1964), Scottish singer
- Mary O'Shaughnessy, American crime writer
- Mary O'Shiell (1715–after 1745), French-Irish privateer shipowner and slave trader
- Mary O'Toole (1874–1954), American first female U.S. municipal judge
- Mary P. Burrill (1881–1946), African-American playwright
- Mary P. Dolciani (1923–1985), American mathematician
- Mary P. Easley, American attorney, academic, and former university administrator
- Mary P. Hamlin (1871–1964), American playwright
- Mary P. Koss, American professor
- Mary Padian, American participant on Storage Wars
- Mary Paillon (1848–1946), French mountain climber and writer
- Mary Paischeff (1899–1975), Finnish ballerina
- Mary Pakington (1878–1949), English playwright
- Mary Paleologus (?–1674), English daughter of assassin Theodore Paleologus
- Mary Palmer (1716–1794), English author
- Mary Pannal (?–1603), English herbalist who was executed for witchcraft
- Mary Pannbacker (?–2015), American speech-language pathologist and university professor
- Mary Papazian (born 1959), American former university president
- Mary Paraskeva (1882–1951), Greek photographer
- Mary Parent (born 1968), American film producer and former studio executive
- Mary Parke (1908–1989), British marine botanist
- Mary Parkinson (born 1936), English former journalist and television presenter
- Mary Parminter (1767–1849), British designer
- Mary Parr (born 1961), Irish hurdler
- Mary Parry (1929–2017), English ice dancer
- Mary Partington (1889–1979), American schoolteacher and goat farmer
- Mary Patricia Plangman, birth name of Patricia Highsmith (1921–1995), American novelist and short story writer
- Mary Patten (born 1951), American artist and activist
- Mary Pattillo, American professor and ethnographer
- Mary Pawlenty (born 1961), American lawyer, judge, and public official
- Mary Paxton Keeley (1886–1986), American journalist
- Mary Pearcey (1866–1890), English woman who was executed for murder
- Mary Peck (born 1952), American photographer
- Mary Peckham (1839–1893), American author and reformer
- Mary Peisley (1718–1757), Irish Quaker writer
- Mary Pellatt (1857–1924), Canadian philanthropist
- Mary Pelloni, American television producer, director, and executive producer
- Mary Pendrill Llewelyn (1811–1874), Welsh poet and translator
- Mary Penfold (1820–1895), English businesswoman and winemaker
- Mary Penington (1623–1682), English Quaker writer and theologian
- Mary Penry (1735–1804), Welsh-born American diarist and accountant
- Mary Perkins (born 1944), English billionaire and businesswoman
- Mary Perkins (nurse) (1839–1893), American nurse during the American Civil War
- Mary Persico, American Roman Catholic nun and academic administrator
- Mary Perth (c. 1740–c. 1813), African American colonist and businesswoman
- Mary Pete (1957–2018), American educator and anthropologist
- Mary Peterson (midwife) (1927–2020), Alutiiq midwife and healer
- Mary Petherbridge (1870–1940), English indexer and writer
- Mary Petherick (1859–1946), British mountaineer and writer
- Mary Petrie (born 1951), Canadian former pair skater
- Mary Phagan (1899–1913), American murder victim
- Mary Phelps Jacob, birth name of Caresse Crosby (1892–1970), American fashion designer, businesswoman, socialite, writer, book publisher, artist, and pornographer
- Mary Philbrook (1872–1958), American attorney
- Mary Philipse (1730–1825), Anglo-Dutch colonial American heiress
- Mary Phillip (born 1977), English international footballer and football team manager
- Mary Pierce (born 1975), French former professional tennis player
- Mary Pike (1776–1832), Irish Quaker heiress
- Mary Pilkington (1761–1839), English novelist and poet
- Mary Pilling (born 1938), English former cricketer
- Mary Pillsbury Weston (1817–1895), American painter
- Mary Pilon (born 1986), American journalist and filmmaker
- Mary Ping (born 1978), American fashion designer
- Mary Pinwill (1871–1962), English professional woodcarver and businesswoman
- Mary Pirie (1822–1885), Scottish botanist and teacher
- Mary Pitcaithly, Scottish civil servant
- Mary Pitman Ailau (1838/1841–1905), American high chiefess of Hawaii
- Mary Pitt (1676–?), English courtier
- Mary Pittman, American chief executive
- Mary Pix (1666–1709), English novelist and playwright
- Mary Player (c. 1857–1924), New Zealand servant, midwife, welfare worker, feminist, and social reformer
- Mary Poafpybitty, birth name of Sanapia (1895–1984), Comanche medicine woman and spiritual healer
- Mary Pocock (1886–1977), South African phycologist
- Mary Pollard (1922–2005), English-born Irish librarian and literary scholar
- Mary Poovey, American cultural historian and literary critic
- Mary Portas (born 1960), English retail consultant and broadcaster
- Mary Porteous (1783–1861), English Primitive Methodist itinerant preacher
- Mary Post (1841–1934), American teacher and pioneer of education
- Mary Pownall (1862–1937), English sculptor
- Mary Poynton (1812–1891), New Zealand Roman Catholic
- Mary Prankster, American singer-songwriter
- Mary Newmarch Prescott (1849–1888), American author and poet
- Mary Prestidge (born 1948), English gymnast
- Mary Pride (born 1955), American author and magazine producer
- Mary Priestley (1925–2017), British music therapist
- Mary Prince (c. 1788–after 1833), British black writer and abolitionist
- Mary Prince (nanny) (born 1946), African American woman wrongly convicted of murder
- Mary Printz (1923–2009), American answering service operator
- Mary Prior (born 1942), British retired university officer
- Mary Proctor (1862–1957), Irish-American popularizer of astronomy
- Mary Proença (born 1935), Brazilian diver
- Mary Puckey (1898–1990), Australian medical doctor and hospital administrator
- Mary Pudlat (1923–2001), Canadian Inuk artist
- Mary Pugh, American mathematician
- Mary Pulling (1871–1951), English-born New Zealand headmistress, writer, and anchoress
- Mary Pünjer (1904–1942), German Jewish shop assistant who was murdered in the Holocaust
- Mary Q. Steele (1922–1992), American author and naturalist
- Mary Qayuaryuk (1908–1982), Inuk printmaker and midwife
- Mary Quade (born 1971), American writer of poetry and nonfiction
- Mary Quaile (1886–1958), Irish trade unionist
- Mary Quant (1930–2023), English fashion designer and icon
- Mary Quigley (1960–1977), American murder victim
- Mary Quin, American former businesswoman and kidnapping victim
- Mary Quintal (born 1929), Singaporean former badminton player and police officer
- Mary R. Calvert (1884–1974), American astronomical computer and astrophotographer
- Mary R. Denman (1823–1899), American temperance activist and social reform leader
- Mary R. Habeck (born 1963), American scholar of international relations
- Mary R. McKie, Canadian artist
- Mary R. P. Hatch (1848–1935), American author
- Mary R. T. McAboy (1815–1892), American poet
- Mary Racelis (born 1932), Filipino sociologist, anthropologist, and development worker
- Mary Rae (1880–1915), New Zealand nurse
- Mary Raftery (1957–2012), Irish investigative journalist, filmmaker, and writer
- Mary Railton (1906–1992), British Army officer
- Mary Rajamani (born 1943), Malaysian sprinter
- Mary Rakow, American novelist
- Mary Ralphson (?–1808), British Army personnel
- Mary Rambaran-Olm, Canadian specialist of early medieval England literature and history
- Mary Ramerman, American activist
- Mary Ramsden (born 1984), British painter
- Mary Rand (born 1940), English former track and field athlete
- Mary Randlett (1924–2019), American photographer
- Mary Randolph (1762–1828), Southern American cook and author
- Mary Rankin Swan (1865–1944), Irish portrait artist
- Mary Rawcliffe (1942–2023), American soprano
- Mary Rebecca Wadsworth, birth name of Rebecca Brandewyne (born 1955), American writer of romance novels
- Mary Reckford (born 1992), American rower
- Mary Redmond (1863–1930), Irish sculptor
- Mary Rees (born 1953), British mathematician and emeritus professor of mathematics
- Mary Reeser (1884–1951), American woman who mysteriously burned to death
- Mary Regan (born 1982), Irish journalist
- Mary Reibey (1777–1855), English-born Australian merchant, shipowner, and trader
- Mary Reidy (1880–1977), New Zealand civilian- and military nurse and community leader
- Mary Remington (1910–2003), English oil painter and artist
- Mary Remnant (1935–2020), English musician, scholar, musicologist, and medievalist
- Mary Renault (1905–1983), English novelist
- Mary Renfrew (born 1955), British professor of midwifery
- Mary Reveley (1940–2017), English racehorse trainer
- Mary Richmond (1861–1928), American social work pioneer
- Mary Richmond (teacher) (1853–1949), New Zealand community leader, teacher, and writer
- Mary Rickert (born 1959), American writer of fantasy fiction
- Mary Rickett (1861–1925), British mathematician
- Mary Riddell (born 1952), English journalist
- Mary Riddell (skier) (born 1980), American Paralympic alpine skier
- Mary Riddle (1902–1981), Native American airplane pilot
- Mary Rider (1876–?), American screenwriter, playwright, and short story writer
- Mary Ridge (1925–2000), British television director
- Mary Rini (1925–2019), American AAGPBL pitcher
- Mary Rippon (1850–1935), American professor
- Mary Roach (born 1959), American author and humorist
- Mary Robison (born 1949), American short story writer and novelist
- Mary Rockwell Hook (1877–1978), American architect and pioneer for women in architecture
- Mary Rodd, Lady Rennell (1901–1981), English landscape artist
- Mary Rodgers (1931–2014), American composer, screenwriter, and author
- Mary Roebling (1905–1994), American banker, businesswoman, and philanthropist
- Mary Rokonadravu, Fijian writer
- Mary Rollason (1764/1765–1835), British businesswoman
- Mary Rolleston (1845–1940), New Zealand homemaker, political hostess, and community leader
- Mary Rolls (1775–1835), English poet
- Mary Roman (1935–2020), American senior Olympics athlete and community leader
- Mary Romero (born 1952), American sociologist
- Mary Romero (boxer) (born 1985), Spanish professional boxer
- Mary Ronan, American educator
- Mary Ronnie (1926–2023), New Zealand librarian
- Mary Rood, 18th-century English silversmith
- Mary Roos (born 1949), German singer
- Mary Rosselli Nissim (1864–1937), Italian artist, composer, and pianist
- Mary Roszela Bellard, birth name of Rosie Ledet (born 1971), American Creole Zydeco accordion player and singer
- Mary Rotolo (1910–1990), American writer and political activist
- Mary Rountree (1922–2007), American AAGPBL player
- Mary Rouse (1926–1993), New Zealand cricketer
- Mary Rowe (born 1936), American professor
- Mary Rowell, American violinist
- Mary Rowlandson (c. 1637–1711), American woman whom Native Americans captured
- Mary Roy (1933–2022), Indian educator and women's rights activist
- Mary Royster (1875–1989), American supercentenarian
- Mary Ruddock (1895–1969), New Zealand clothes designer and businesswoman
- Mary Rudge (1842–1919), English chess master
- Mary Ruefle (born 1952), American poet, essayist, and professor
- Mary Ruggie (born 1945), American sociologist and professor
- Mary Rundle (1907–2010), English military personnel
- Mary Russ (born c. 1953), American retired jockey
- Mary Ruthsdotter (1944–2010), American feminist activist
- Mary Rutnam (1873–1962), Canadian doctor, gynaecologist, suffragist, and pioneer of women's rights
- Mary Ruwart (born 1949), American retired biomedical researcher, and speaker, writer, and activist
- Mary Danforth Ryle (1833–1904), American philanthropist
- Mary S. B. Shindler (1810–1883), American poet, writer, and editor
- Mary S. Caswell (1847–1924), American educator and writer
- Mary S. Cummins (1854–1894), American educator
- Mary S. Hartman (born 1941), American academic of gender studies
- Mary S. Lovell, British writer
- Mary S. Metz, American academic administrator
- Mary S. Peake (1823–1862), American teacher and humanitarian
- Mary S. Washburn (1868–1932), American sculptor
- Mary Sachs (1882–1973), American playwright and poet
- Mary Safford (1851–1927), American Unitarian minister
- Mary Sampson Patterson Leary Langston (c. 1835–1915), American abolitionist
- Mary Sandbach (1901–1990), British translator
- Mary Sandeman, real name of Aneka (born 1947), Scottish retired traditional singer
- Mary Sandoval, American mathematician and professor
- Mary Sands (1872–1949), American singer
- Mary Sansom (1935–2010), English operatic soprano
- Mary Sara (born 1986), Japanese fashion model and singer
- Mary Sarah (born 1995), American country music singer and songwriter
- Mary Saran (1897–1976), German-born English journalist and author
- Mary Sartain, American real estate manager, and contestant on Survivor (American TV series)
- Mary Sauer (born 1975), American pole vaulter
- Mary Saunders (born 1947), American retired U.S. Air Force personnel
- Mary Sawtelle (1835–1894), American medical doctor
- Mary Saxby (1738–1801), British vagrant
- Mary Saxer (born 1987), American track and field athlete
- Mary Say (1739/1740–1832), British printer and newspaper publisher
- Mary Scales (1928–2013), American professor, civic leader, and funeral home owner
- Mary Schapiro (born 1955), American lawyer and civil servant
- Mary Schaps (born 1948), Israeli-American mathematician, professor, and dean
- Mary Scharlieb (1845–1930), British pioneer physician and gynaecologist
- Mary Schendlinger (born 1948), Canadian writer and editor
- Mary Schenley (1826–1903), American philanthropist
- Mary Schepisi (born 1949), American artist
- Mary Schiavo, American aviation lawyer and whistleblower
- Mary Schleicher (1855–1949), Australian Anglican deaconess
- Mary Schmich (born 1953), American journalist
- Mary Schneider (born 1932), Australian singer and performer
- Mary Scotvold, American figure skating coach
- Mary Scranton (1918–2015), American consultant, community advocate, and academic trustee
- Mary Scullion (born 1950s), American Roman Catholic religious sister and activist
- Mary Seacole (1805–1881), English nurse, writer, and businesswoman
- Mary Seaton (born 1956), American former alpine skier
- Mary Selway (1936–2004), English casting director
- Mary Semans (1920–2012), American philanthropist
- Mary Seton (1542–1615), Scottish courtier, and later a nun
- Mary Settegast (1934–2020), American contemporary scholar and author
- Mary Sexton, Canadian film- and television producer
- Mary Sey (1952–2024), Gambian judge
- Mary Shaffer (born 1947), American artist
- Mary Shane (1945–1987), American MLB broadcaster
- Mary Shanley (1896–1989), American police officer and detective
- Mary Shannon (born 1944), English retired table tennis player
- Mary Shapard (c. 1882–c. 1950s), American author and peace activist
- Mary Sharp (1778–1812), British activist
- Mary Shawa, Malawian former public official
- Mary Sheepshanks (1872–1960), English pacifist, feminist, journalist, and social worker
- Mary Shelton (1510s–1570s), English poet and writer
- Mary Shepard (1909–2000), English illustrator of children's books
- Mary Sheridan (1899–1978), English paediatrician and public health officer
- Mary Sheriff (1950–2016), American art historian and professor
- Mary Sherlach (?–2012), American victim of the Sandy Hook Elementary School shooting
- Mary Sherwood (1856–1935), American physician, educator, and spokesperson
- Mary Shields (musher), American dog sledder
- Mary Shirville (1926–2020), English author and flower arranger
- Mary Short (1802–1849), Indian queen; wife of king Ghazi-ud-Din Haidar Shah
- Mary Shreve (Ames) Frothingham (1867–1955), American member of the Ames family
- Mary Shudi (?–1797), English harpsichord maker
- Mary Sia (1899–1971), Chinese-American teacher and cookbook author
- Mary Sibande (born 1982), South African artist
- Mary Sibbet Copley (1843–1929), American philanthropist and charity worker
- Mary Easton Sibley (1800–1878), American pioneer and educator
- Mary Siddon (fl. 1783), English thief
- Mary Siezgle, American Civil War nurse and soldier
- Mary Silber, American mathematician, physicist, and professor
- Mary Silberman (born 1997), Israeli wheelchair basketball player
- Mary Silliman (1736–1818), American matriarch in Revolutionary- and post-colonial Connecticut
- Mary Silvani (1948–1982), American murder victim
- Mary Simmons (1???–c. 1687), English printer
- Mary Simon (born 1947), Canadian civil servant, diplomat, and former broadcaster
- Mary Theresa Simpson (1951/1952–1964), American murder victim
- Mary Sink, alternate name of Virginia Sink (1913–1986), American chemical engineer; first woman automotive engineer at Chrysler
- Mary Sinnott (born 1943), Irish former camogie- and badminton player
- Mary Size (1882/1883–1959), Irish penal reformer and officer
- Mary Skeaping (1902–1984), English ballerina, ballet teacher, director, choreographer, and producer
- Mary Skrenes, American comic book writer and screenwriter
- Mary Slessor (1848–1915), Scottish Presbyterian missionary to Nigeria
- Mary Annie Sloane (1867–1961), English artist
- Mary Smallwood (1919–2023), British historian and professor of Romano-Jewish history
- Mary Smart (1832–1849), the earliest known Sierra Leonean resident in Reading, England
- Mary Smieton (1902–2005), British civil servant
- Mary Smirke (1779–1853), English artist and translator
- Mary Snell-Hornby (born 1940), British-Austrian translator and scholar
- Mary Snow (1902–1978), British botanist
- Mary McCarty Snow (1928–2012), American composer, organist/pianist, and publisher
- Mary Snowden (born 1940), American painter and educator
- Mary Soames (1922–2014), English author
- Mary Soderstrom (born 1942), Canadian novelist and short story- and non-fiction writer
- Mary Sojourner (born 1940), American novelist, NPR commentator, columnist, and environmental- and social justice activist
- Mary Solari (1849–1929), Italian-American artist
- Mary Soronadi (born 1971), Nigerian handball player
- Mary Southcott (1862–1943), Canadian nurse, hospital administrator, and campaigner
- Mary Southin (born 1931), Canadian retired judge
- Mary Spackman, American physician
- Mary Spargo (1904–1991), American newspaper journalist and columnist
- Mary Spear (1913–2006), English cricketer
- Mary Speer (1925–2014), American southern gospel singer
- Mary Speir Gunn (1862–1913), Scottish murder victim
- Mary Speke (c. 1625–1697), English nonconformist patron and political activist
- Mary Spender (born 1990), British singer-songwriter, guitarist, and YouTube personality
- Mary Sperling, birth name of Dee Dee Phelps, American singer-songwriter and author
- Mary Sperry, American suffragist
- Mary Spilde (born 1951), Scottish retired educator
- Mary Spiller (1924–2019), English horticulturist and teacher
- Mary Spio, Ghanaian deep space engineer, tech innovator, and entrepreneur
- Mary Spiteri (born 1947), Maltese singer and television personality
- Mary Spry (1922–2002), English cricketer
- Mary Squibb, American mystery- and crime novelist
- Mary Stacey (born 1961), English judge, lawyer, and solicitor
- Mary Stachowicz (1951–2002), Polish American murder victim
- Mary Stainbank (1899–1996), South African sculptor
- Mary Stallard (born 1967), Welsh Anglican bishop
- Mary Stallcup (1954–1997), American lawyer
- Mary Stallings (born 1939), American jazz vocalist; mother of soul singer Adriana Evans
- Mary Stanisia (1878–1967), American Catholic nun, artist, and painter
- Mary Stanley (1813–1879), English Roman Catholic nun, philanthropist, and nurse
- Mary Stanton (born 1947), American author
- Mary Stapleton (1837–1918), British local historian
- Mary Stapleton-Bretherton (1809–1883), British landowner and businesswoman
- Mary Starrett, Canadian candidate in the 2006 Oregon gubernatorial election
- Mary Stauffer, American murder victim
- Mary Staunton, Irish musician and concertina- and accordion player
- Mary Steedman (1867–1921), English tennis player
- Mary Steen (1856–1939), Danish photographer and feminist
- Mary Steinhauser (1942–1975), Canadian social worker and prison classification officer
- Mary Ashley Stevenson (born 2005), American basketball player
- Mary Haviland Stilwell Kuesel (1866–1936), American dentist
- Mary Stiner, American curator, academic, and professor of anthropology
- Mary Stirling, American labor unionist
- Mary Stockdale (1774–1854), English religious writer
- Mary Stocks, Baroness Stocks (1891–1975), English writer, economic historian, and suffragist
- Mary Stoddard (c. 1852–1901), Scottish-born Australian artist
- Mary Stoiana (born 2003), American tennis player
- Mary Stolz (1920–2006), American fiction writer
- Mary Stonehouse (1722–1751), British heiress
- Mary Stormont (1871–1962), English painter
- Mary Story, American medical researcher, professor, and science writer
- Mary Stott (1907–2002), English feminist and journalist
- Mary Strangman (1872–1943), Irish doctor, public health advocate, and women's suffragist
- Mary Struthers (born 1950), American former professional tennis player
- Mary Sturge (1862–1925), English medical doctor and suffragist
- Mary Sturt (1896–1993), British educational psychologist and historian of education
- Mary Sudbury (1934–2018), Scottish engineer
- Mary Sully (1896–1963), Yankton Dakota avant-garde artist
- Mary Summer (1842–1902), French writer and historian
- Mary Sumner, 19th-century English silversmith
- Mary Sumner (1828–1921), English women's rights activist
- Mary Surratt (1820 or 1823–1865), American boarding house owner
- Mary Swainson (1908–2008), English pioneer of student counselling
- Mary Swan, Canadian novelist and short story writer
- Mary Swander (born 1950), American author
- Mary Swanzy (1882–1978), Irish landscape- and genre artist
- Mary Sweeny, 19th-century American criminal
- Mary Swope, real name of Topo Swope (born 1949), American actress and talent agent
- Mary Symon (1863–1938), Scottish poet
- Mary Symonds (1772–1854), English watercolour painter
- Mary Szybist (born 1970), American poet
- Mary T. Boatwright (born 1952), American professor emerita of classical studies and ancient history
- Mary T. Ficalora (born 1960), American author, educator, event coordinator, and television producer
- Mary T. Meagher (born 1964), American former competition swimmer, Olympic champion, and world record-holder
- Mary T. Reiley (1858–1878), American poet
- Mary T. Waggaman (1846–1931), American author of Catholic literature
- Mary T. Wales (1874–1952), American educator
- Mary Tabor (born 1946), American author of literary fiction, professor, radio show host, and columnist
- Mary Tadd (born 1936), English former javelin thrower
- Mary Taft (1772–1851), British Wesleyan Methodist preacher
- Mary TallMountain (1918–1994), American poet and storyteller
- Mary Tannahill (1863–1951), American painter, printmaker, embroiderer, and batik maker
- Mary Tanner (born 1938), British academic
- Mary Tape (1857–1934), American desegregation activist
- Mary Tassugat (1918–2016), Canadian Inuk artist
- Mary Tautari (?–1906), New Zealand Māori schoolteacher, interpreter, and postmaster
- Mary Tealby (1801–1865), English animal welfare campaigner
- Mary Teasdel (1863–1937), American impressionist artist
- Mary Teichman (born 1954), American artist and printmaker
- Mary Teissier (1917–1990), Ukrainian-French socialite, heiress, interior designer, and art collector
- Mary Telfair (1791–1875), American art collector and philanthropist
- Mary Tenney Castle (1819–1907), American missionary and philanthropist
- Mary Terán de Weiss (1918–1984), Argentine tennis player
- Mary Terrall (1952–2023), American academic and science historian
- Mary Thalassa Alford Cruso, birth name of Thalassa Cruso (1909–1997), English-born American presenter and author on horticulture
- Mary Theisen-Lappen (born 1990), American weightlifter
- Mary the Jewess, 3rd-century Jewish alchemist, scholar, writer, inventor, and occultist
- Mary Thimelby (1610–1690), English prioress
- Mary Thipe (1917–1982), South African anti-apartheid and human rights activist
- Mary Thom (1944–2013), American feminist, writer, and editor
- Mary Thomford Sellmer (1902–?), American game warden
- Mary Thornycroft (1809–1895), English sculptor
- Mary Threlfall (1910–1996), Australian nurse
- Mary Tiffen (1931–2020), British economic historian, scholar, and development professional
- Mary Tiles (born 1946), American philosopher and historian of mathematics and science
- Mary Tillinghast, British cook and writer
- Mary Tillotson, American broadcast journalist
- Mary Timms, Nigerian model and beauty pageant titleholder
- Mary Timney (?–1862), Scottish woman executed for murder
- Mary Timony (born 1970), American independent singer-songwriter, guitarist, keyboardist, bassist, and violist
- Mary Tindale (1920–2011), Australian botanist
- Mary Tinetti, American physician and professor
- Mary Tinney (1924–2006), Irish ambassador
- Mary Toft (c. 1701–1763), English medical hoaxer
- Mary Tombiri (born 1972), Nigerian retired track and field sprinter
- Mary Tomlinson, real name of Marjorie Main (1890–1975), American character actress
- Mary Tonkin (born 1973), Australian artist
- Mary Tooth (1778–1843), British Methodist preacher
- Mary Tortorich (1914–2017), American voice teacher
- Mary Totah (1957–2017), American Roman Catholic nun and non-fiction writer
- Mary Tourtel (1874–1948), British artist and writer
- Mary Towq Ghosh (born 1963), Lebanese translator and writer
- Mary Treadgold (1910–2005), English novelist, literary editor, and broadcaster producer
- Mary Treat (1830–1923), American naturalist, botanist, entomologist, and author
- Mary Tregear (1924–2010), British museum curator and art historian
- Mary Treglia (1897–1959), American social worker
- Mary Trevelyan (1897–1983), British warden of the Student Movement House
- Mary Trlica, American missing female
- Mary Troby, 19th-century English silversmith
- Mary Trye (1642–?), English writer and folk healer
- Mary Tsingou (1928–2026), American physicist and mathematician
- Mary Tsiongas (born 1959), Greek-born American multi-disciplinary artist
- Mary Tsukamoto (1915–1998), Japanese American educator, cultural historian, and civil rights activist
- Mary Tuck (1928–1996), English criminologist, psychologist, and civil servant
- Mary Tuplin (1870–1887), Canadian murder victim
- Mary Turnbull (1927–2008), English historian and author
- Mary Turzillo (born 1940), American science fiction writer
- Mary Twining (1726–1804), English businesswoman
- Mary Two-Axe Earley (1911–1996), Canadian Mohawk- and Oneida women's rights activist
- Mary Tyrwhitt (1903–1997), British Army officer
- Mary U. Rothrock (1890–1976), American librarian and historian
- Mary Uduma (born 1952), Nigerian business executive
- Mary Underwood, Australian former international lawn bowls player
- Mary Unwin (1724–1796), British friend of English poet and Anglican hymnwriter William Cowper
- Mary Uprichard (born 1938), British nursing-, midwifery-, and health care activist
- Mary Upton Ferrin (1810–1881), American suffragette and women's rights advocate
- Mary V. Clymer (1861–1942), American nurse
- Mary V. Relling, American pharmacogeneticist
- Mary V. R. Thayer (1902–1983), American socialite, journalist, and author
- Mary V. Seeman (1935–2024), Canadian psychiatrist and professor
- Mary Valencia (born 2003), Colombian-born Chilean footballer
- Mary Valverde (born 1975), Latina-American artist
- Mary Van Blarcom (1913–1953), American artist
- Mary Vandervliet (1912–2004), Canadian sprinter
- Mary Van Ess, American curler
- Mary Vane-Tempest (c. 1858–1873), British daughter of George Vane-Tempest, 5th Marquess of Londonderry
- Mary van Kleeck (1883–1972), American social scientist and socialist
- Mary Van Rensselaer Buell (1893–1969), American chemist
- Mary Varnham (born 1946), New Zealand writer and publisher
- Mary Vaughan (born 1953), Irish archer
- Mary Vaux Walcott (1860–1940), American artist and naturalist
- Mary Vere (1581–1671), English letter writer
- Mary Verghese (1925–1986), Indian physician
- Mary Vetsera (1871–1889), Austrian noblewoman and mistress
- Mary Vieira (1927–2001), Brazilian sculptor
- Mary Vingoe, Canadian playwright and theatre director
- Mary von Schrader Jarrell (1914–2007), American patron of the arts and memoirist
- Mary von Stein, birth name of M. J. Hegar (born 1976), American U.S. Air Force veteran and former politician
- Mary Voytek, American microbiologist and astrobiologist
- Mary W. Bacheler (1860–1939), American physician and Baptist medical missionary in India
- Mary W. Chapin (1820–1889), American educator
- Mary W. M. Falconer (1867–1944), Scottish writer, poet, governess, and teacher
- Mary W.M. Hargreaves (1914–2008), American scholar of agricultural history
- Mary W. S. Wong, Singaporean lawyer
- Mary Wacera Ngugi (born 1988), Kenyan long-distance runner
- Mary Alsop King Waddington (1833–1923), American author
- Mary Wagaki (born 1954), Kenyan long-distance runner
- Mary Wagner (born 1949), American lawyer and retired judge
- Mary Wagner (Canada) (born 1974), Canadian anti-abortion advocate
- Mary Wakefield (born 1954), American nurse and health care administrator
- Mary Wakefield (journalist) (born 1975), British journalist
- Mary Walcott (1675–c. 1752), American girl called as a witness at the Salem witch trials
- Mary Waldron (born 1984), Irish association footballer and cricketer
- Mary Lily Walker (1863–1913), Scottish social reformer in Dundee
- Mary Walter (radio), American radio show host, political commentator, and voiceover artist
- Mary Walton, American inventor
- Mary Wambui, Kenyan businesswoman
- Mary Wandesford (1655–1726), Irish religious unmarried woman
- Mary Warburg (1908–2009), American philanthropist
- Mary Warburg (artist) (1866–1934), German painter and sculptor
- Mary Wardell (1832–1917), British philanthropist and hospital administrator
- Mary Warnock, Baroness Warnock (1924–2019), English philosopher of morality, education, and mind, and a writer on existentialism
- Mary Washburn (1907–1994), American athlete
- Mary Watt (1917–2005), New Zealand landscape architect and gardener
- Mary Way (1769–1833), American painter
- Mary Waya (born 1968), Malawian netball player and coach
- Mary Wayte (born 1965), American former competition swimmer, Olympic medalist, and television sports commentator
- Mary Weatherford (born 1963), American painter
- Mary Weddle (1934–2021), American AAGPBL player
- Mary Weiss (1948–2024), American singer and interior designer; member of girl group The Shangri-Las
- Lady Mary Wellesley (born 1986), British writer and historian
- Mary Wellstead (1850–1894), Australian scientist
- Mary Wemyss (1868–1951), English novelist
- Mary Wesley (1912–2002), English novelist
- Mary West (born 1945/1946), American entrepreneur and philanthropist
- Mary West, American murder victim
- Mary Westbrook (1829–1908), American author and poet
- Mary Westenholz (1857–1947), Danish Unitarian, women's rights activist, writer, and editor
- Mary Westmacott, pseudonym of Agatha Christie (1890–1976), English writer
- Mary Wharton (1912–1991), American botanist, author, and environmental activist
- Mary Wheatland (1835–1924), English swimming instructor, bathing machine keeper, and life-saver
- Mary Wheelhouse (c. 1868–c. 1947), English painter, illustrator, toymaker, and suffragette
- Mary Whelan, Irish diplomat
- Mary Whipple (born 1980), American coxswain
- Mary Whistler, alternate name of Ida Pollock (1908–2013), English novelist and painter
- Mary Whitebird, American author
- Mary Whitehouse (1910–2001), British teacher and conservative activist
- Mary Whitmer (1778–1856), German-born American Book of Mormon witness
- Mary Whitmore (1884–1974), English teacher, social activist, and mayor
- Mary Whitton, American computer scientist
- Mary Whyte (born 1953), American watercolor artist and author
- Mary Wibberley (c. 1934–2013), English romantic fiction writer
- Mary Wiggins (1904–1974), American composer, educator, organist, and pianist
- Mary Wigman (1886–1973), German dancer and choreographer
- Mary Wilburn (1932–2021), American lawyer and government official
- Mary Wilde, Baroness Penzance (1825–1900), English gardener
- Mary Wilkinson (1909–2001), English scholar of German literature and culture
- Mary Willingham, American woman who partook in the University of North Carolina academic-athletic scandal
- Mary Willumsen (1884–1961), Danish photographer
- Mary Wilshire (born 1953), American comics artist
- Mary Windeyer (1836–1912), English-born Australian women's rights campaigner, suffragist, philanthropist, and charity organizer
- Mary Wineberg (born 1980), American track and field athlete
- Mary Wings (born 1949), American cartoonist, writer, and artist
- Mary Winkler (born 1973), American woman convicted of voluntary manslaughter
- Mary Winningham, real name of Mare Winningham (born 1959), American actress and singer-songwriter
- Mary Winsor (1869–1956), American suffragist
- Mary Wirepa (1904–1971), New Zealand visual artist
- Mary Wise (born 1959), American college volleyball coach, former player, and author
- Mary Wittenberg (born 1962), American sports executive
- Mary Wixey (1921–2017), British track and field athlete
- Mary Woffington (1729–1811), Irish socialite
- Mary Opal Wolanin (1910–1997), American nurse and expert in eldercare
- Mary Wollstonecraft (1759–1797), English writer and founding feminist philosopher
- Mary Wolverston, 16th-century English pirate
- Mary Wondrausch (1923–2016), English artist, potter, historian, and writer
- Mary Woodall (1901–1988), British art historian, museum director, and Thomas Gainsborough scholar
- Mary Woody (1926–2010), American nurse, hospital administrator, and university professor
- Mary Chawner Woody (1846–1928), American Quaker minister, educator, and temperance leader
- Mary Woolley Gibbings Cotton, Viscountess Combermere (1799–1889), Irish author
- Mary Wootters, American coding theorist, information theorist, and theoretical computer scientist
- Mary Wroth (1587–1650s), English noblewoman and poet
- Mary Wu, Chinese classical pianist
- Mary Wurm (1860–1938), English pianist and composer
- Mary Wyatt (1789–1871), British botanist, phycologist, and retailer
- Mary Wyche (1858–1936), American nurse
- Mary Xaveria of the Angels, religious name of Catharine Burton (1668–1714), English nun and writer
- Mary Yamashiro Otani (1923–2005), American community activist
- Mary Yancey (1902–1992), American ceramic artist and designer
- Mary Yasuko Fujishima (1927-2021), Japanese businessperson, manager, and promoter
- Mary Yee (1897–1965), Native American linguist
- Mary Yost (1881–1954), American academic
- Mary Youngblood, American musician and performer of the Native American flute
- Mary Yu (born 1957), American lawyer and former Supreme Court justice
- Mary Yuriko Nakahara, birth name of Yuri Kochiyama (1921–2014), American civil rights activist
- Mary Zappone (born 1964), American businesswoman
- Mary Zicafoose, American textile artist, weaver, and teacher
- Mary Ziegler (born 1982), American legal historian
- Mary Zilba (born 1963), American singer and television personality
- Mary Zimmerman (born 1960), American theatre- and opera director and playwright
- Mary Zirin (1932–2019), American scholar and writer
- Mary Zophres, American costume designer

== Disambiguation pages ==
This section lists links to pages listing people of the same name.

- Mary Abbott (disambiguation)
- Mary Adams (disambiguation)
- Mary Ahern (disambiguation)
- Mary Aiken (disambiguation)
- Mary Alexander (disambiguation)
- Mary Alden (disambiguation)
- Mary Aldis (disambiguation)
- Mary Allen (disambiguation)
- Mary Allison (disambiguation)
- Mary Anderson (disambiguation)
- Mary Andrews (disambiguation)
- Mary Arden (disambiguation)
- Mary Armstrong (disambiguation)
- Mary Arnold (disambiguation)
- Mary Arundell (disambiguation)
- Mary Ashford (disambiguation)
- Mary Ashworth (disambiguation)
- Mary Atkinson (disambiguation)
- Mary Austin (disambiguation)
- Mary Avery (disambiguation)
- Mary Bailey (disambiguation)
- Mary Bain (disambiguation)
- Mary Baird (disambiguation)
- Mary Baker (disambiguation)
- Mary Baldwin (disambiguation)
- Mary Ball (disambiguation)
- Mary Banks (disambiguation)
- Mary Barber (disambiguation)
- Mary Barlow (disambiguation)
- Mary Barnes (disambiguation)
- Mary Barnett (disambiguation)
- Mary Barr (disambiguation)
- Mary Barrett (disambiguation)
- Mary Barry (disambiguation)
- Mary Bartlett (disambiguation)
- Mary Barton (disambiguation)
- Mary Bassett (disambiguation)
- Mary Beard (disambiguation)
- Mary Beaumont (disambiguation)
- Mary Bell (disambiguation)
- Mary Belle (disambiguation)
- Mary Bennett (disambiguation)
- Mary Benson (disambiguation)
- Mary Bentley (disambiguation)
- Mary Berger (disambiguation)
- Mary Bernard (disambiguation)
- Mary Berry (disambiguation)
- Mary Bethune (disambiguation)
- Mary Billings (disambiguation)
- Mary Bird (disambiguation)
- Mary Black (disambiguation)
- Mary Blackford (disambiguation)
- Mary Blair (disambiguation)
- Mary Blanchard (disambiguation)
- Mary Booth (disambiguation)
- Mary Bowers (disambiguation)
- Mary Bowie (disambiguation)
- Mary Boyce (disambiguation)
- Mary Boyd (disambiguation)
- Mary Boyle (disambiguation)
- Mary Bradford (disambiguation)
- Mary Bray (disambiguation)
- Mary Breckinridge (disambiguation)
- Mary Brooks (disambiguation)
- Mary Brown (disambiguation)
- Mary Bruce (disambiguation)
- Mary Bryan (disambiguation)
- Mary Bryant (disambiguation)
- Mary Buchanan (disambiguation)
- Mary Burke (disambiguation)
- Mary Burks (disambiguation)
- Mary Burnett (disambiguation)
- Mary Burns (disambiguation)
- Mary Burton (disambiguation)
- Mary Butler (disambiguation)
- Mary Butt (disambiguation)
- Mary Byrd (disambiguation)
- Mary Byrne (disambiguation)
- Mary Cabell (disambiguation)
- Mary Cahill (disambiguation)
- Mary Cain (disambiguation)
- Mary Caldwell (disambiguation)
- Mary Cameron (disambiguation)
- Mary Campbell (disambiguation)
- Mary Carey (disambiguation)
- Mary Carpenter (disambiguation)
- Mary Carroll (disambiguation)
- Mary Carter (disambiguation)
- Mary Casey (disambiguation)
- Mary Chan (disambiguation)
- Mary Charles (disambiguation)
- Mary Charlton (disambiguation)
- Mary Chase (disambiguation)
- Mary Childs (disambiguation)
- Mary Cholmondeley (disambiguation)
- Mary Christian (disambiguation)
- Mary Christie (disambiguation)
- Mary Clark (disambiguation)
- Mary Clarke (disambiguation)
- Mary Clay (disambiguation)
- Mary Cohen (disambiguation)
- Mary Coleman (disambiguation)
- Mary Collins (disambiguation)
- Mary Connor (disambiguation)
- Mary Conway (disambiguation)
- Mary Cook (disambiguation)
- Mary Cooke (disambiguation)
- Mary Cooper (disambiguation)
- Mary Copeland (disambiguation)
- Mary Costello (disambiguation)
- Mary Cotton (disambiguation)
- Mary Coughlan (disambiguation)
- Mary Craig (disambiguation)
- Mary Crane (disambiguation)
- Mary Crawford (disambiguation)
- Mary Cromwell (disambiguation)
- Mary Crowley (disambiguation)
- Mary Cunningham (disambiguation)
- Mary Curran (disambiguation)
- Mary Curtis (disambiguation)
- Mary Cutting (disambiguation)
- Mary Daly (disambiguation)
- Mary Darling (disambiguation)
- Mary Davidson (disambiguation)
- Mary Davies (disambiguation)
- Mary Davis (disambiguation)
- Mary Dawson (disambiguation)
- Mary Day (disambiguation)
- Mary Dickerson (disambiguation)
- Mary Dickinson (disambiguation)
- Mary Dickson (disambiguation)
- Mary Dillon (disambiguation)
- Mary Dixon (disambiguation)
- Mary Dodge (disambiguation)
- Mary Donaldson (disambiguation)
- Mary Douglas (disambiguation)
- Mary Doyle (disambiguation)
- Mary DuBois (disambiguation)
- Mary Dudley (disambiguation)
- Mary Duncan (disambiguation)
- Mary Dunlap (disambiguation)
- Mary Dunn (disambiguation)
- Mary Dunne (disambiguation)
- Mary Eastman (disambiguation)
- Mary Eaton (disambiguation)
- Mary Eddy (disambiguation)
- Mary Edgar (disambiguation)
- Mary Edmunds (disambiguation)
- Mary Edwards (disambiguation)
- Mary Ellis (disambiguation)
- Mary English (disambiguation)
- Mary Evans (disambiguation)
- Mary Fiennes (disambiguation)
- Mary Finlay (disambiguation)
- Mary Fisher (disambiguation)
- Mary Fitzgerald (disambiguation)
- Mary Flaherty (disambiguation)
- Mary Fletcher (disambiguation)
- Mary Flores (disambiguation)
- Mary Foley (disambiguation)
- Mary Foster (disambiguation)
- Mary Frampton (disambiguation)
- Mary Francis (disambiguation)
- Mary Fowler (disambiguation)
- Mary Fox (disambiguation)
- Mary Foy (disambiguation)
- Mary Fraser (disambiguation)
- Mary Freeman (disambiguation)
- Mary French (disambiguation)
- Mary Gabriel (disambiguation)
- Mary Galvin (disambiguation)
- Mary Gamewell (disambiguation)
- Mary Garcia (disambiguation)
- Mary Gardiner (disambiguation)
- Mary Garner (disambiguation)
- Mary Gay (disambiguation)
- Mary George (disambiguation)
- Mary Gibbs (disambiguation)
- Mary Gibson (disambiguation)
- Mary Gill (disambiguation)
- Mary Gleason (disambiguation)
- Mary Godolphin (disambiguation)
- Mary Godwin (disambiguation)
- Mary Gonzaga (disambiguation)
- Mary Good (disambiguation)
- Mary Gordon (disambiguation)
- Mary Graham (disambiguation)
- Mary Grant (disambiguation)
- Mary Gray (disambiguation)
- Mary Green (disambiguation)
- Mary Greene (disambiguation)
- Mary Gregory (disambiguation)
- Mary Grey (disambiguation)
- Mary Griffith (disambiguation)
- Mary Halford (disambiguation)
- Mary Hall (disambiguation)
- Mary Hamm (disambiguation)
- Mary Hansen (disambiguation)
- Mary Hardy (disambiguation)
- Mary Harper (disambiguation)
- Mary Harris (disambiguation)
- Mary Harrison (disambiguation)
- Mary Hart (disambiguation)
- Mary Harvey (disambiguation)
- Mary Haskell (disambiguation)
- Mary Hawkins (disambiguation)
- Mary Hay (disambiguation)
- Mary Hayward (disambiguation)
- Mary Healy (disambiguation)
- Mary Heath (disambiguation)
- Mary Heaton (disambiguation)
- Mary Heffernan (disambiguation)
- Mary Henderson (disambiguation)
- Mary Henry (disambiguation)
- Mary Hicks (disambiguation)
- Mary Hinton (disambiguation)
- Mary Hobbs (disambiguation)
- Mary Holland (disambiguation)
- Mary Holmes (disambiguation)
- Mary Hooper (disambiguation)
- Mary Hopkins (disambiguation)
- Mary Howe (disambiguation)
- Mary Hudson (disambiguation)
- Mary Hughes (disambiguation)
- Mary Hunt (disambiguation)
- Mary Hunter (disambiguation)
- Mary Hussey (disambiguation)
- Mary Hutchinson (disambiguation)
- Mary Hutton (disambiguation)
- Mary Irwin (disambiguation)
- Mary Jackson (disambiguation)
- Mary Jacobs (disambiguation)
- Mary James (disambiguation)
- Mary Jeffries (disambiguation)
- Mary Jenkins (disambiguation)
- Mary John (disambiguation)
- Mary Johnson (disambiguation)
- Mary Johnston (disambiguation)
- Mary Jones (disambiguation)
- Mary Jordan (disambiguation)
- Mary Joseph (disambiguation)
- Mary Karl (disambiguation)
- Mary Keane (disambiguation)
- Mary Keller (disambiguation)
- Mary Kelly (disambiguation)
- Mary Kennedy (disambiguation)
- Mary King (disambiguation)
- Mary Kirby (disambiguation)
- Mary Knight (disambiguation)
- Mary Lambert (disambiguation)
- Mary Lambie (disambiguation)
- Mary Lawlor (disambiguation)
- Mary Lawrence (disambiguation)
- Mary Lawson (disambiguation)
- Mary Leach (disambiguation)
- Mary Lee (disambiguation)
- Mary Leslie (disambiguation)
- Mary Lewis (disambiguation)
- Mary Lincoln (disambiguation)
- Mary Livingston (disambiguation)
- Mary Livingstone (disambiguation)
- Mary Lloyd (disambiguation)
- Mary Locke (disambiguation)
- Mary Lockwood (disambiguation)
- Mary Logan (disambiguation)
- Mary Long (disambiguation)
- Mary Lord (disambiguation)
- Mary Love (disambiguation)
- Mary Low (disambiguation)
- Mary Lowe (disambiguation)
- Mary Lyon (disambiguation)
- Mary MacDonald (disambiguation)
- Mary Mackay (disambiguation)
- Mary Maclean (disambiguation)
- Mary MacLeod (disambiguation)
- Mary Maher (disambiguation)
- Mary Mahoney (disambiguation)
- Mary Mann (disambiguation)
- Mary Manning (disambiguation)
- Mary Marsh (disambiguation)
- Mary Marshall (disambiguation)
- Mary Martin (disambiguation)
- Mary Matthews (disambiguation)
- Mary Maxwell (disambiguation)
- Mary May (disambiguation)
- Mary McCaffree (disambiguation)
- Mary McCall (disambiguation)
- Mary McCarthy (disambiguation)
- Mary McConnel (disambiguation)
- Mary McCracken (disambiguation)
- Mary McDonald (disambiguation)
- Mary McDowell (disambiguation)
- Mary McElroy (disambiguation)
- Mary McGee (disambiguation)
- Mary McIntyre (disambiguation)
- Mary McLaughlin (disambiguation)
- Mary McLendon (disambiguation)
- Mary McLeod (disambiguation)
- Mary McPhillips (disambiguation)
- Mary Mellish (disambiguation)
- Mary Mendum (disambiguation)
- Mary Meyer (disambiguation)
- Mary Miller (disambiguation)
- Mary Mills (disambiguation)
- Mary Mitchell (disambiguation)
- Mary Monroe (disambiguation)
- Mary Moody (disambiguation)
- Mary Moore (disambiguation)
- Mary Moran (disambiguation)
- Mary Morgan (disambiguation)
- Mary Morris (disambiguation)
- Mary Morrison (disambiguation)
- Mary Morrissey (disambiguation)
- Mary Morton (disambiguation)
- Mary Murphy (disambiguation)
- Mary Murray (disambiguation)
- Mary Nash (disambiguation)
- Mary Newman (disambiguation)
- Mary Nichols (disambiguation)
- Mary Nolan (disambiguation)
- Mary Norton (disambiguation)
- Mary Nutting (disambiguation)
- Mary O'Brien (disambiguation)
- Mary O'Connell (disambiguation)
- Mary O'Connor (disambiguation)
- Mary O'Hara (disambiguation)
- Mary O'Leary (disambiguation)
- Mary O'Malley (disambiguation)
- Mary O'Neal (disambiguation)
- Mary O'Neill (disambiguation)
- Mary O'Reilly (disambiguation)
- Mary O'Sullivan (disambiguation)
- Mary Oliver (disambiguation)
- Mary Ormsby (disambiguation)
- Mary Osborn (disambiguation)
- Mary Owen (disambiguation)
- Mary Owens (disambiguation)
- Mary Page (disambiguation)
- Mary Parker (disambiguation)
- Mary Parsons (disambiguation)
- Mary Patterson (disambiguation)
- Mary Pearson (disambiguation)
- Mary Pelham (disambiguation)
- Mary Perry (disambiguation)
- Mary Peters (disambiguation)
- Mary Petty (disambiguation)
- Mary Phillips (disambiguation)
- Mary Pickering (disambiguation)
- Mary Pickford (disambiguation)
- Mary Pope (disambiguation)
- Mary Porter (disambiguation)
- Mary Potter (disambiguation)
- Mary Powell (disambiguation)
- Mary Pratt (disambiguation)
- Mary Price (disambiguation)
- Mary Purcell (disambiguation)
- Mary Quinn (disambiguation)
- Mary Radcliffe (disambiguation)
- Mary Ramsey (disambiguation)
- Mary Rasmussen (disambiguation)
- Mary Ray (disambiguation)
- Mary Read (disambiguation)
- Mary Reed (disambiguation)
- Mary Reid (disambiguation)
- Mary Reilly (disambiguation)
- Mary Reynolds (disambiguation)
- Mary Rhodes (disambiguation)
- Mary Rice (disambiguation)
- Mary Richards (disambiguation)
- Mary Richardson (disambiguation)
- Mary Riley (disambiguation)
- Mary Ripley (disambiguation)
- Mary Robb (disambiguation)
- Mary Roberts (disambiguation)
- Mary Robinson (disambiguation)
- Mary Rogers (disambiguation)
- Mary Rose (disambiguation)
- Mary Ross (disambiguation)
- Mary Russell (disambiguation)
- Mary Ryan (disambiguation)
- Mary Salter (disambiguation)
- Mary Sanders (disambiguation)
- Mary Sawyer (disambiguation)
- Mary Scanlon (disambiguation)
- Mary Schweitzer (disambiguation)
- Mary Scott (disambiguation)
- Mary Sears (disambiguation)
- Mary Sewell (disambiguation)
- Mary Shakespear (disambiguation)
- Mary Sharpe (disambiguation)
- Mary Shaw (disambiguation)
- Mary Shelley (disambiguation)
- Mary Shepherd (disambiguation)
- Mary Sherman (disambiguation)
- Mary Simpson (disambiguation)
- Mary Sinclair (disambiguation)
- Mary Slattery (disambiguation)
- Mary Small (disambiguation)
- Mary Smith (disambiguation)
- Mary Snodgrass (disambiguation)
- Mary Somerville (disambiguation)
- Mary Spencer (disambiguation)
- Mary Spicer (disambiguation)
- Mary Stafford (disambiguation)
- Mary Stearns (disambiguation)
- Mary Stevens (disambiguation)
- Mary Stone (disambiguation)
- Mary Sullivan (disambiguation)
- Mary Susan (disambiguation)
- Mary Sutherland (disambiguation)
- Mary Sweeney (disambiguation)
- Mary Swift (disambiguation)
- Mary Talbot (disambiguation)
- Mary Tate (disambiguation)
- Mary Taylor (disambiguation)
- Mary Temple (disambiguation)
- Mary Teresa (disambiguation)
- Mary Theresa (disambiguation)
- Mary Therese (disambiguation)
- Mary Thomas (disambiguation)
- Mary Thompson (disambiguation)
- Mary Thomson (disambiguation)
- Mary Thorne (disambiguation)
- Mary Tobin (disambiguation)
- Mary Townley (disambiguation)
- Mary Townsend (disambiguation)
- Mary Tracy (disambiguation)
- Mary Travers (disambiguation)
- Mary Trump (disambiguation)
- Mary Tucker (disambiguation)
- Mary Turner (disambiguation)
- Mary Tyler (disambiguation)
- Mary Vernon (disambiguation)
- Mary Villiers (disambiguation)
- Mary Vincent (disambiguation)
- Mary Virginia (disambiguation)
- Mary Wade (disambiguation)
- Mary Walker (disambiguation)
- Mary Waller (disambiguation)
- Mary Walsh (disambiguation)
- Mary Walters (disambiguation)
- Mary Ward (disambiguation)
- Mary Ware (disambiguation)
- Mary Warren (disambiguation)
- Mary Washington (disambiguation)
- Mary Waters (disambiguation)
- Mary Watkins (disambiguation)
- Mary Watson (disambiguation)
- Mary Watts (disambiguation)
- Mary Webb (disambiguation)
- Mary Webster (disambiguation)
- Mary Weir (disambiguation)
- Mary Wells (disambiguation)
- Mary Whately (disambiguation)
- Mary Wheeler (disambiguation)
- Mary White (disambiguation)
- Mary Whitehead (disambiguation)
- Mary Whitney (disambiguation)
- Mary Wilcox (disambiguation)
- Mary Willard (disambiguation)
- Mary Williams (disambiguation)
- Mary Willis (disambiguation)
- Mary Willoughby (disambiguation)
- Mary Wills (disambiguation)
- Mary Willson (disambiguation)
- Mary Wilson (disambiguation)
- Mary Winchester (disambiguation)
- Mary Winslow (disambiguation)
- Mary Wiseman (disambiguation)
- Mary Wolf (disambiguation)
- Mary Wood (disambiguation)
- Mary Woods (disambiguation)
- Mary Worth (disambiguation)
- Mary Wright (disambiguation)
- Mary Yates (disambiguation)
- Mary Young (disambiguation)

== See also ==
- List of people with given name Marie
- Maria (given name)
