= Christ at the home of Mary and Martha =

Painting by Henry Ossawa Tanner

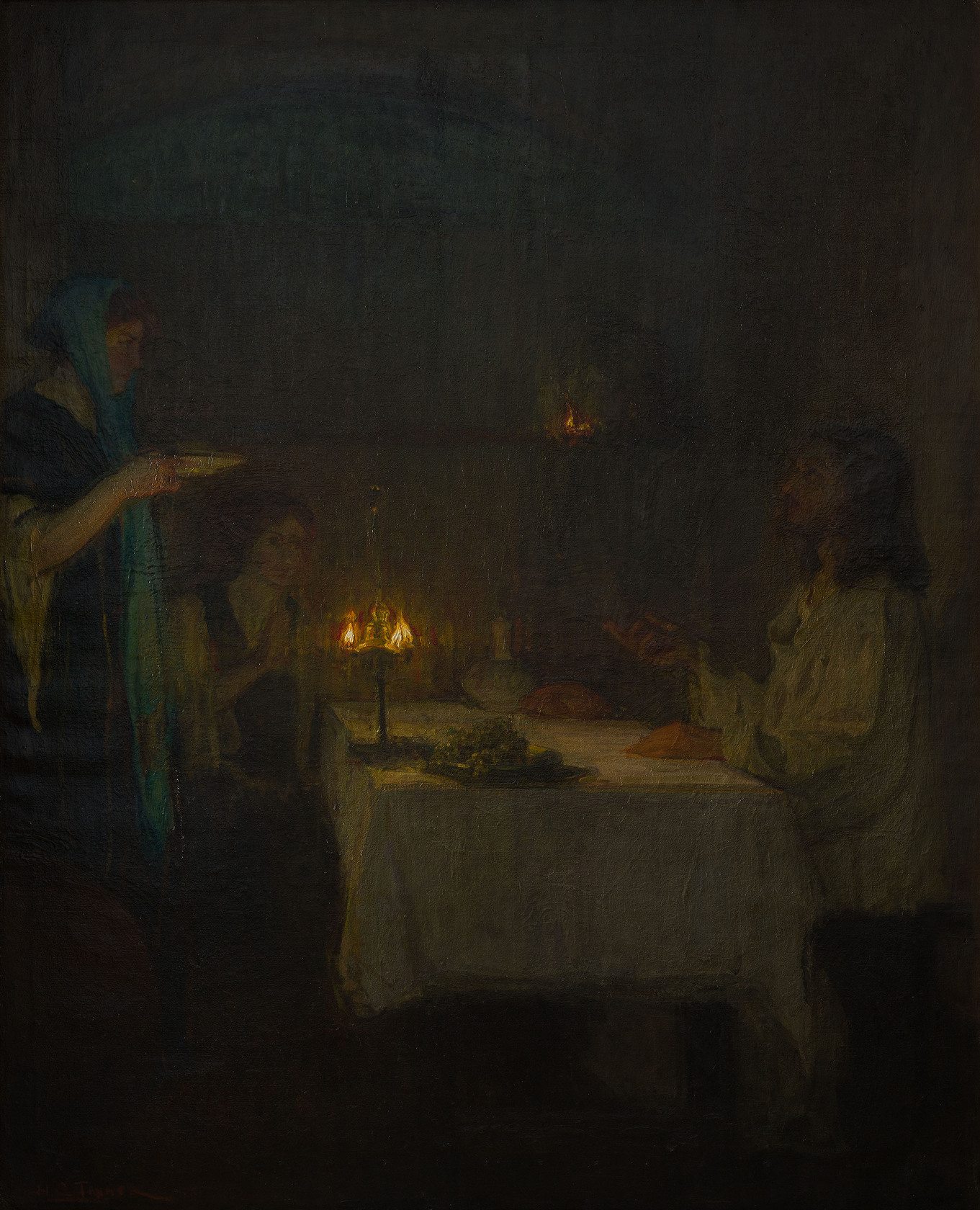
Christ at the home of Mary and Martha, by Henry Ossawa Tanner

Christ at the home of Mary and Martha is a painting by Henry Ossawa Tanner of the New Testament episode known as Christ in the House of Martha and Mary. It was completed about 1905 and permanently in the collections of the Carnegie Museum of Art in Pittsburgh, Pennsylvania. Tanner spoke of the painting as having been particularly challenging to paint. The painting was purchased in 1907 by the museum. It was also exhibited in Pittsburgh in 1907 and New York in 1908.

The painting illustrates Luke 10, verses 38–42 in the Bible, when Christ ate at the table of the sisters Martha and Mary. In the scripture, Martha is doing all the work to serve as hostess to Jesus, while her sister sat with him. She reproved Mary for sitting while she did all the work. The painting is painted at the moment of the conversation, when Jesus reproves her, saying "Martha, Martha, thou art careful and troubled about many things: But one thing is needful: and Mary hath chosen that good part, which shall not be taken away from her."

== Technically difficult ==
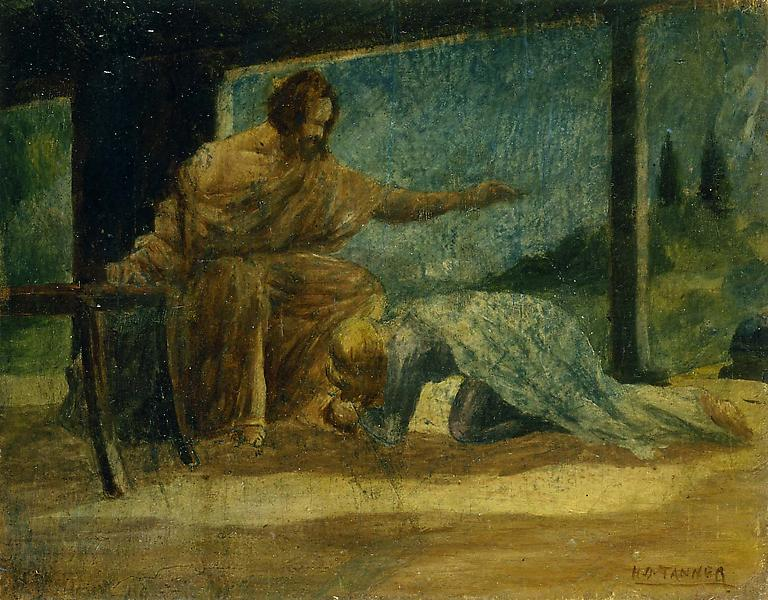
Mary Magdalene washing the feet of Christ

The painting was commented on by Tanner who said, "Very probably the most difficult effect I have ever undertaken is that in the picture." Those studying the image have tried to discern what Tanner meant.

One possibility was lighting; Throughout many of Tanner's images, paintings made of dim light subjects are common. Like this painting, some such as The Banjo Lesson and Nicodemus visiting Jesus feature multiple lights. Viewers can look at his paintings to detect from patches of light and shadows, where the lights are positioned.

Another possibility with this painting is a deliberate merging of multiple story lines, created by the overlapping of the newer painting Christ at the home of Mary and Martha over the top of another unidentified painting. Tanner painted one painting over another, covering it. Tanner has been found to have done this elsewhere, building up layers of paint and creating texture. The technique allowed hime to create a pentimento in the shadow under the lamp in the center, between Mary and Jesus. This is speculated to be Judas, who in John 12, criticized Mary for spending money on Jesus when she washed his feet, using perfume and wiping his feet with her own hair.

Different photo-edits of the painting

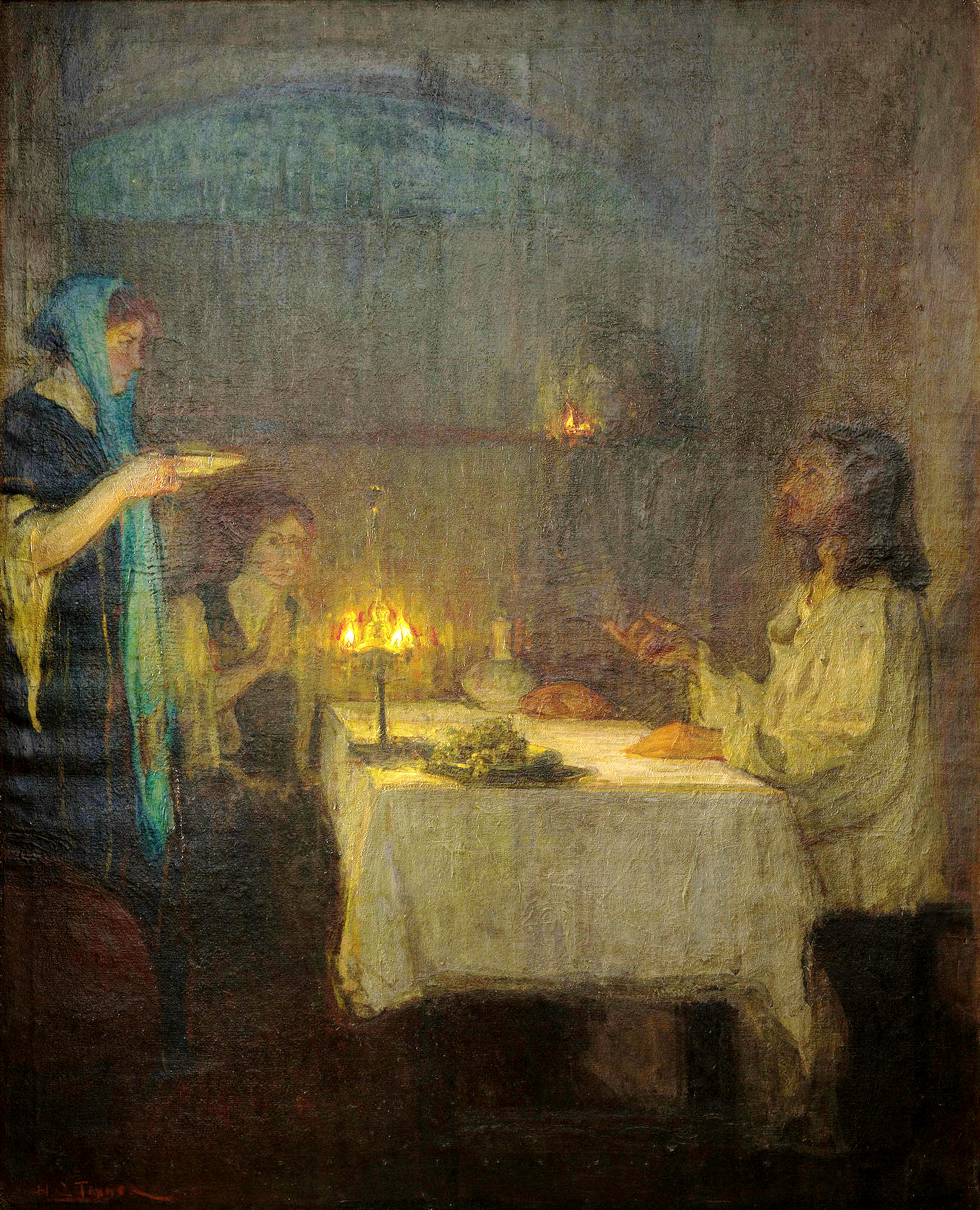
Christ at the home of Mary and Martha lightened. In this lightened version, the figure of "Judas" is more clearly visible.

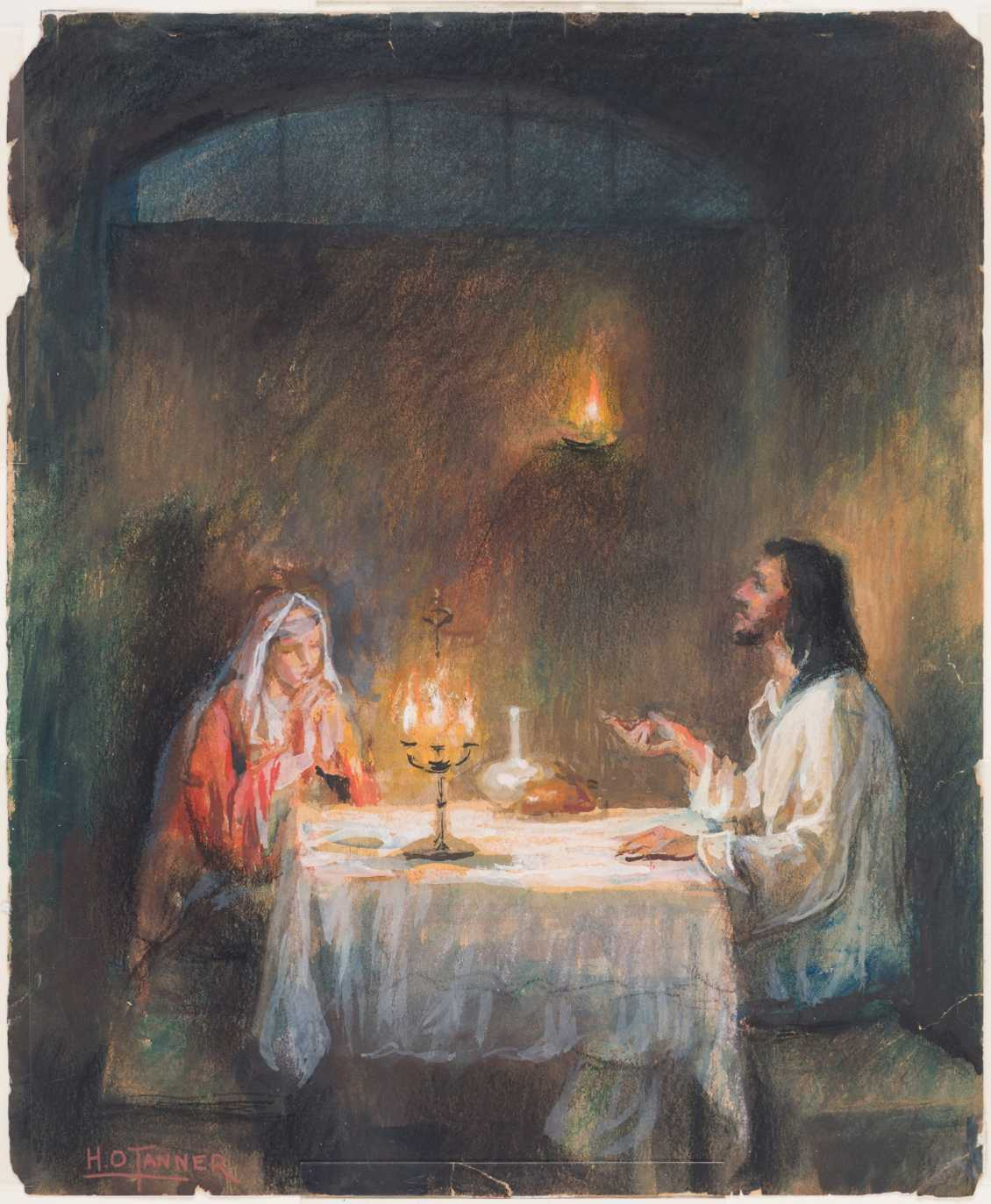
Another version of Christ in the home of Mary (and Martha) with lights and shadows more clearly visible

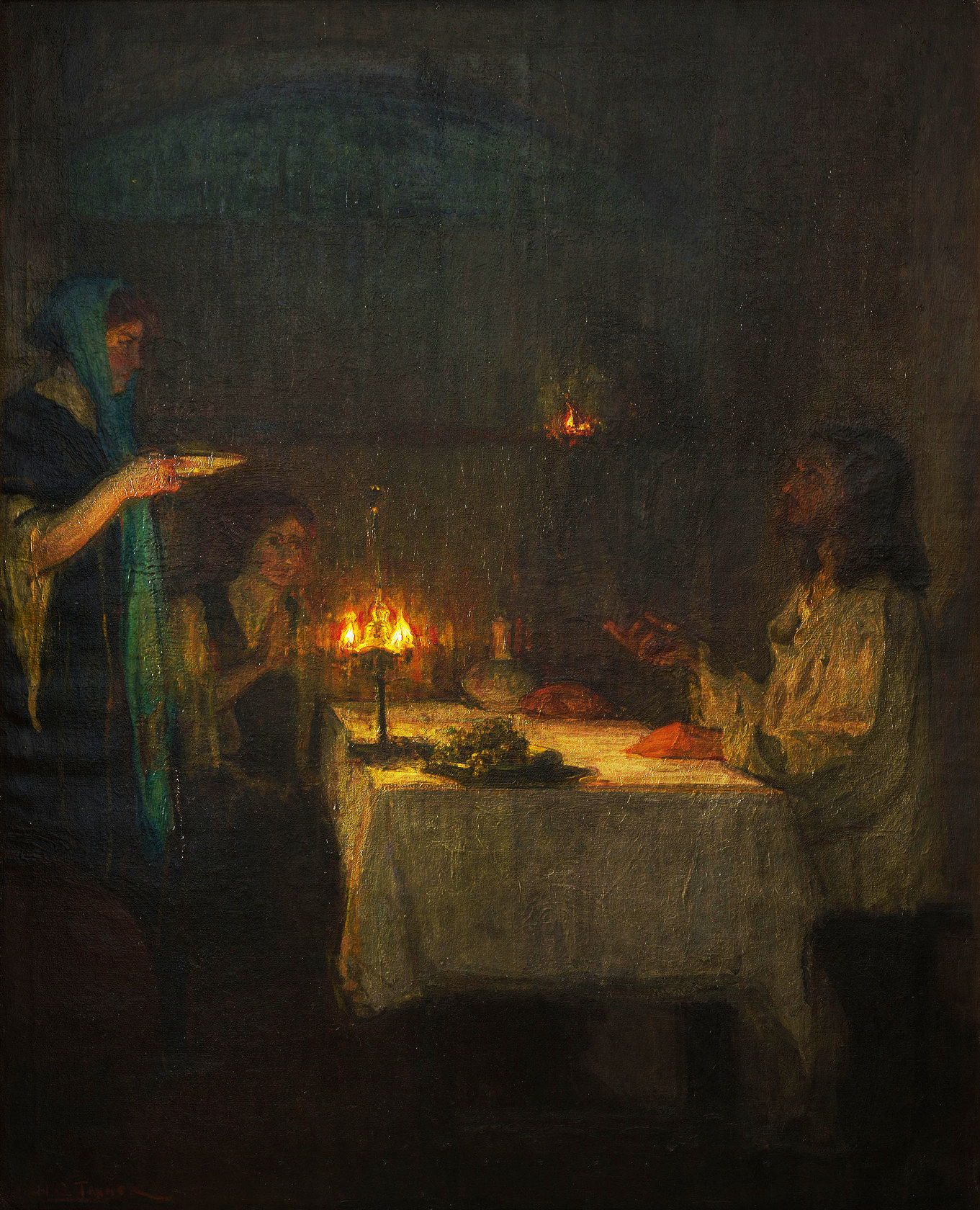
Version of Christ in the Home of Mary and Martha, modified from original, to balance flame and darkness

== See also ==
- List of paintings by Henry Ossawa Tanner
