= Jesus at the home of Martha and Mary =

Episode in the Gospels

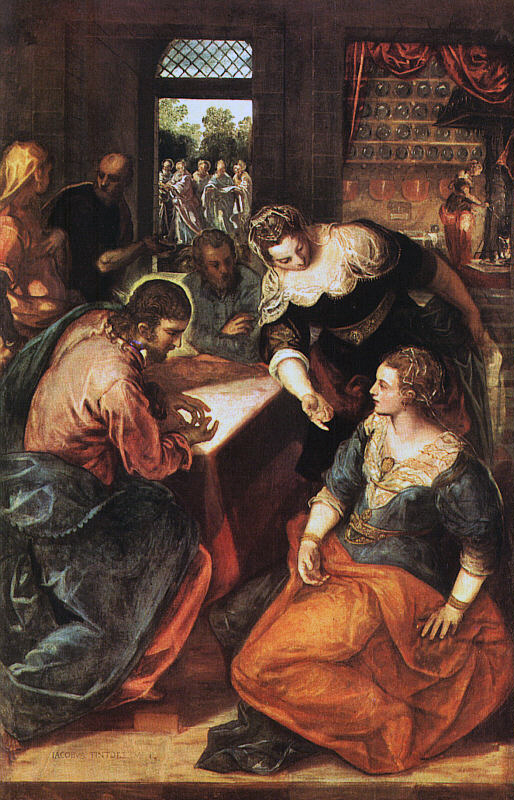
Christ in the House of Martha and Mary by Tintoretto, 1570s

Jesus at the home of Martha and Mary is an episode in the life of Jesus in the New Testament which is only recounted in Luke's Gospel (Luke 10:38–42), where it appears immediately after the Parable of the Good Samaritan (Luke 10:25–37).

Luke's account reads:

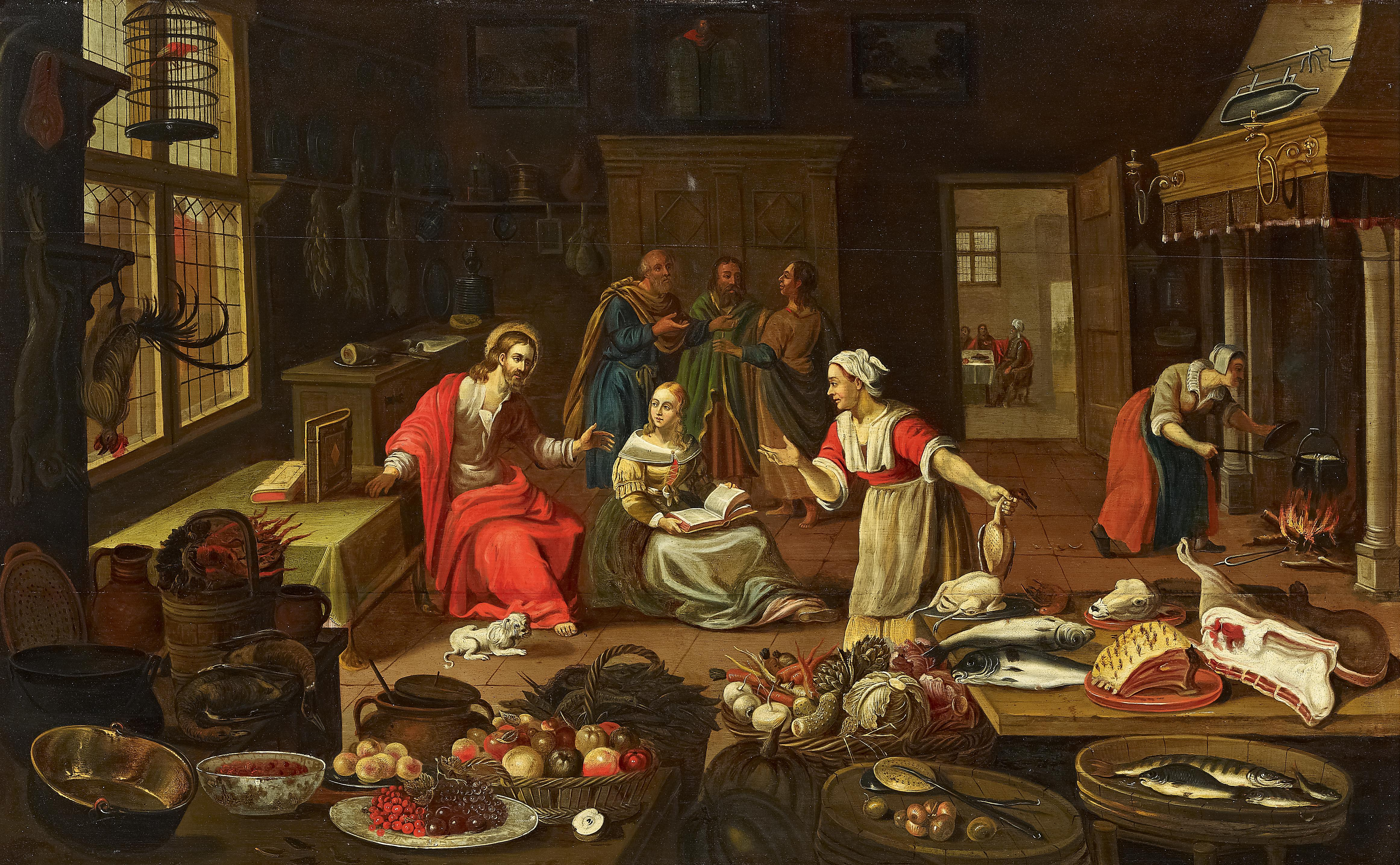
Georg Friedrich Stettner: Christ at the home of Martha and Mary

As Jesus and his disciples were on their way, he came to a village where a woman named Martha opened her home to him. She had a sister called Mary, who sat at the Lord's feet listening to what he said. But Martha was distracted by all the preparations that had to be made. She came to him and asked, "Lord, don't you care that my sister has left me to do the work by myself? Tell her to help me!" "Martha, Martha," the Lord answered, "you are worried and upset about many things, but only one thing is needed. Mary has chosen what is better, and it will not be taken away from her."

— Luke 10:38–42: New International Version

In art the event is usually called Christ in the House of Martha and Mary, although other variant names are also used.

== Setting ==
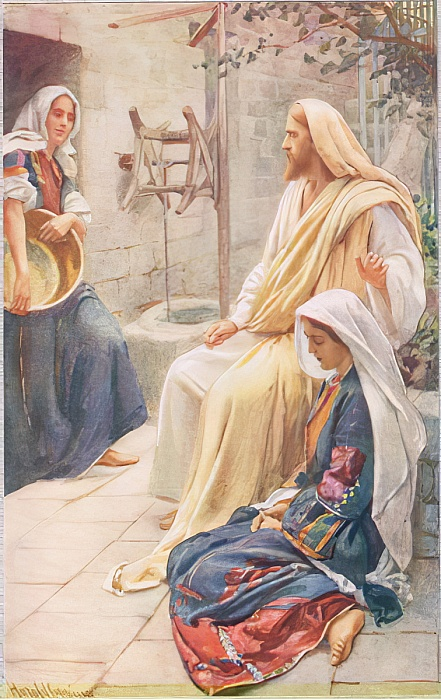
Martha and Mary illustration from the Women of the Bible, Harold Copping

It is not entirely clear where this story is set, and who the characters in it are. Although there are several similarities between Mary and Martha here and the characters in John 11–12, no brother called Lazarus appears here. Whether this Mary is also the unnamed woman who anointed Jesus's head in Matthew 26 and Mark 14 is not generally agreed. Moreover, scholars now generally agree that the unnamed sinful woman in Luke 7 is not Mary of Bethany nor Mary Magdalene either, and Luke 7:39 has the sinful woman living in a town (probably Nain, mentioned in 7:11), not in an unnamed village as Martha and Mary do in Luke 10. (Note: Luke 7:39 indicates that the sinful woman was living 'in the town/city' (Greek: ἐν τῇ πόλει, en têi pólei).) Jesus was staying in; the preceding narrative of the Raising of the son of the widow of Nain (7:11–17) locates Jesus in Nain. Luke 7:11–17 labels Nain a polis three times, in verses 7:11 and 7:12. On the other hand, the unnamed place where Mary and Martha live in Luke 10:38–42 is labelled a 'village' (Greek: κώμη, kómè) in verse 10:38. Luke therefore linguistically connects the sinful woman to a city/town, and distinguishes the unnamed home of Mary and Martha as a village.

Due to the parallels with John 11–12, this unnamed village has traditionally often been identified with the Judean village of Bethany, for example by Poole (1669), Gill (1748), Benson (1857), Jamieson-Fausset-Brown (1871), Ellicott (1878), Barnes (1884), Farrar (1891), and the Pulpit Commentary (1800s). However, Luke 10 appears to be set strictly in Galilee, and thus gives no geographic reason to identify the unnamed village of Martha and Mary with Bethany in Judea. Meyer's NT Commentary (1880 English edition) noted that "Jesus cannot yet be in Bethany (see Luke 13:22, Luke 17:11), where Martha and Mary dwelt (John 11:1; John 12:1 f.)" but supposed that "Luke, because he was unacquainted with the more detailed circumstances of the persons concerned, transposed this incident, which must have occurred in Bethany, and that on an earlier festal journey, not merely to the last journey, but also to some other village, and that a village of Galilee." Burkitt (1931) stated: 'We have a story [in Lk 10^{37–42}] of a pair of sisters, Martha and Mary, who seem to have lived in Galilee. (...) There is nothing to indicate the place or the time: were it not for what we read in the Fourth Gospel it would surely never have occurred to any one to suppose that the sisters lived just outside Jerusalem.' Unlike Meyer, Burkitt concluded that not the author of Luke, but the author of John had '[made] unhistorical use of tradition already in circulation'. Esler and Piper distinguished the two villages, based on the Galilean context of the chapter in Luke. They posited that the Gospel of John deliberately mixed up several separate stories from the Synoptic Gospels, namely that of the Markan–Matthean anointing of Jesus (for his upcoming death) by an unnamed woman in Bethany (Mark 14 and Matthew 26), the Lukan Jesus' visit to Martha and Mary in an unnamed village (Luke 10), and the Lukan parable of the rich man and Lazarus (Luke 16). Esler and Piper argued that author did not strive to give a historically accurate account of what had happened, but instead, for theological purposes, combined various existing narratives in order to construct Lazarus, Mary and Martha of Bethany as a prototypical Christian family, whose example is to be followed by Christians.

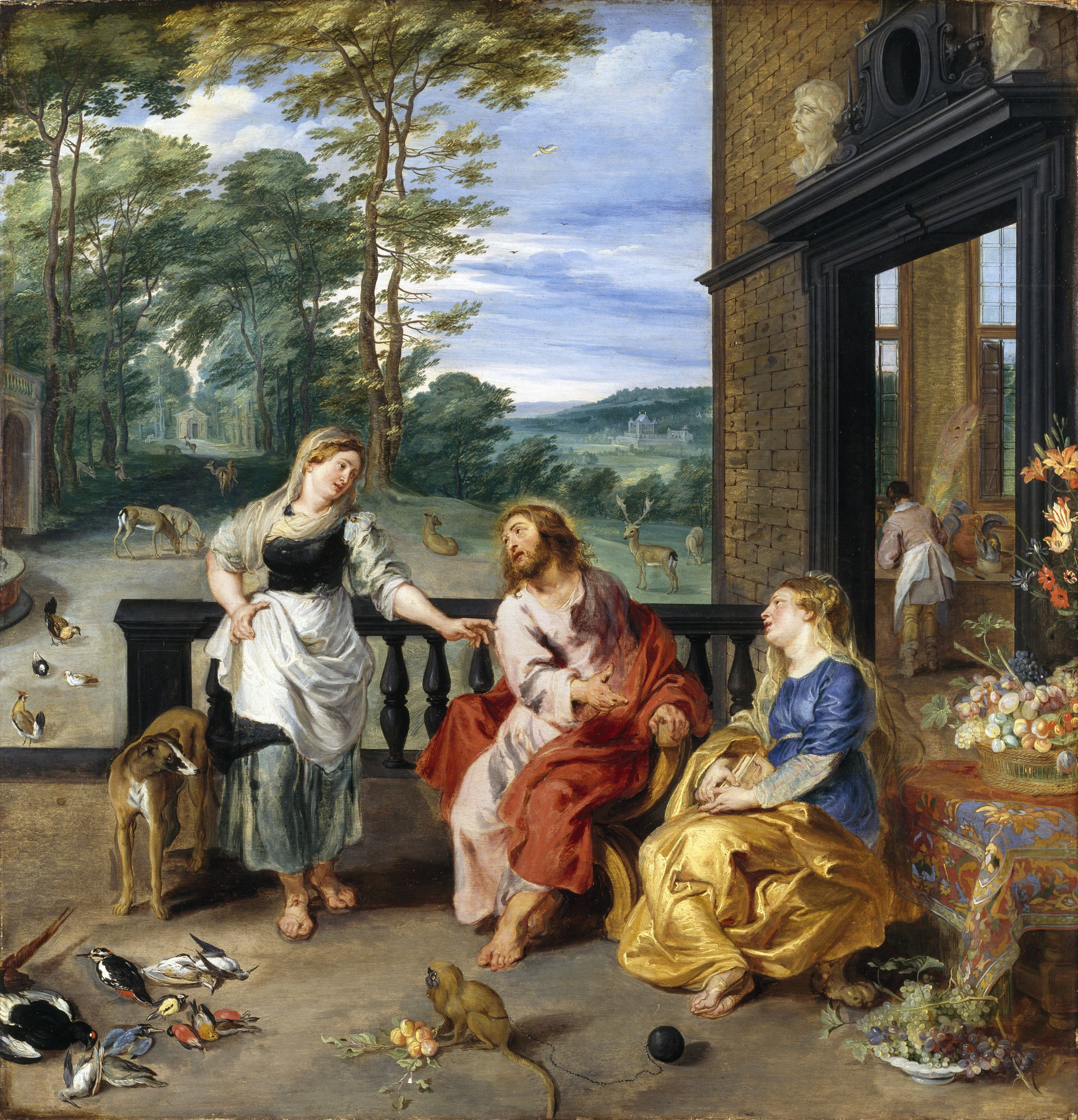
Christ in the House of Martha and Mary by Jan Brueghel the Younger and Peter Paul Rubens, 1628

George Ogg (1971) proposed a different solution: the author of Luke had two sources for the same journey of Jesus from Galilee to Jerusalem. He used source A to write Luke 9:51–10:42 as the main account (ending with Jesus's visit to Mary and Martha's village, identified as Bethany as in John 11–12), and source B to write Luke 17:11–19:28 as either an amplified retelling of A, or a supplement to A. Rather than trying to integrate the two sources into a single account of the journey, the author kept the accounts separate to ensure that the "episodes would be in correct sequence". Lastly, the verses Luke 11:1–17:11 between A and B are not part of Jesus's journey to Jerusalem, Ogg contended: "Essentially Luke xi. 1—xvii. 10 is a record of activities of Jesus during his ministry in Galilee, Phoenicia and the Decapolis and prior to his final departure from Galilee for Jerusalem."

== Interpretation ==
Shifting gender expectations, as well as the views of primarily male interpreters, have led to a diversity of interpretations of this passage. Modern presuppositions about women's domestic roles have often imagined Martha's "preparations" to be related to food, placing her in the kitchen in this scene. Food, however, does not seem to be at play. Martha is the householder (Luke 10:38) and the many "preparations" which distract her are rendered by the Greek word diakonia, a word used for services often associated with a particular office of an association, leading some commentators to imagine Martha's business to be related to helping Jesus' movement.

Mary, who is listening to Jesus, is said to have chosen "the better part". The distinction made by Jesus is frequently interpreted as meaning that spiritual values are more important than material business, such as preparation of food. Two different words describe her distress – "worry", and "distract" – and Luke accordingly doubles her name and uses alliteration to draw attention to her anxious behavior (Greek: Μάρθα Μάρθα μεριμνᾷς, Martha, Martha, merimnas in Luke 10:41).

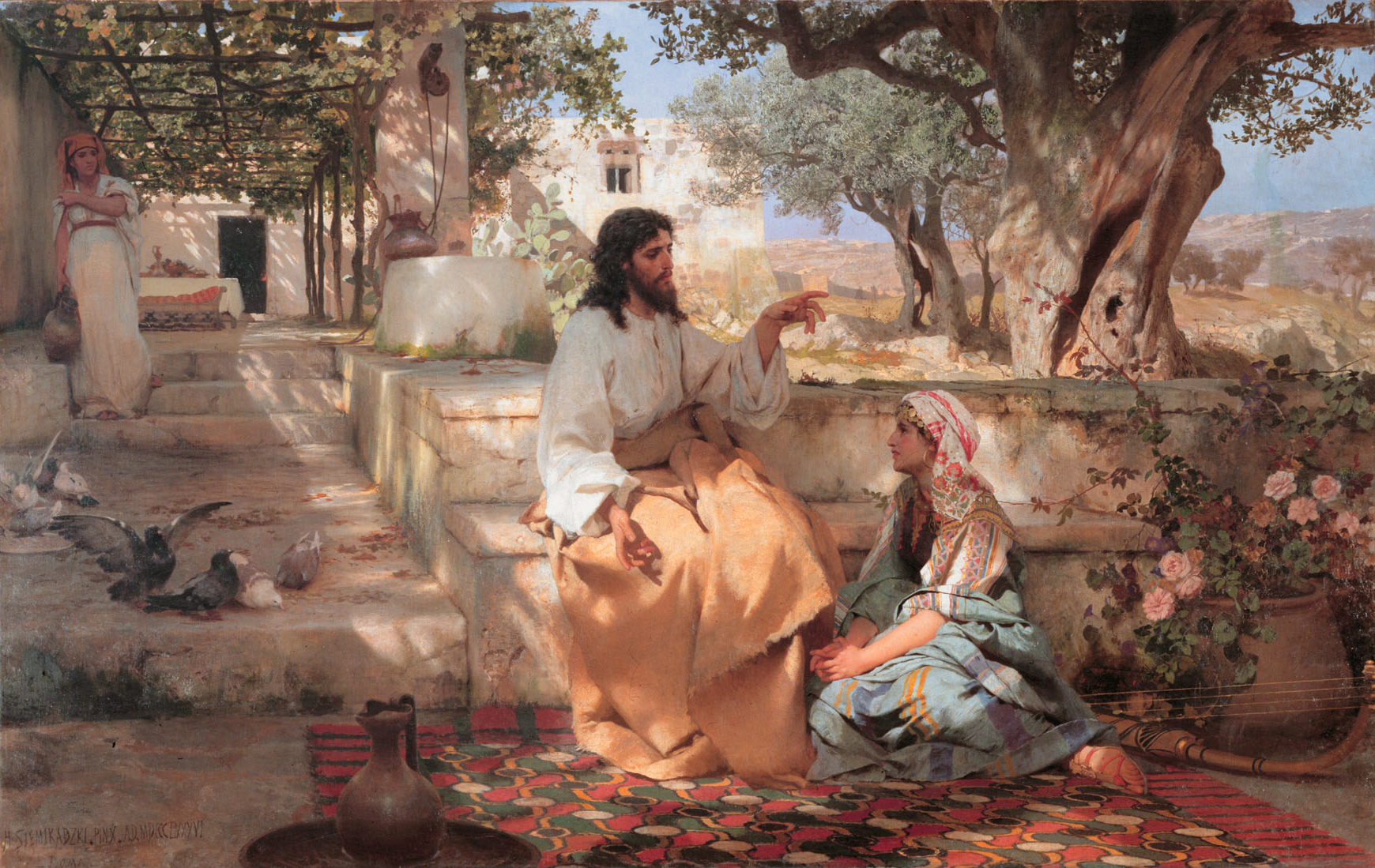
Christ with Martha and Maria by Henryk Siemiradzki, 1886

Origen (died 253) stated that "action and contemplation do not exist one without the other". He pictured Martha as representing a fledgling Christian still largely concerned with the practical life while Mary represented the mature Christian. One necessarily grew from one to the other but did not abandon action and service. Martha received the Word through her physical act of service while Mary received Jesus spiritually through her attentiveness to His teachings.

Basil of Caesarea (died 379) referenced the "few things" in the passage as referring to food and drink that is prepared. One need not have many "dishes", just a few are needed for the body. A willingness to serve in the smallest thing is pleasing to God. Similarly, George Leo Haydock (1774–1849) referred to some writers who "think that Christ's meaning was, that Martha was preparing many dishes, when one was sufficient".

John Chrysostom (died 407) noted that some used the passage for condoning leading a life of leisure, eschewing all manual labor. This was a handy invective of certain "heretics", such as the Messalians, who emphasized the inner life to an extreme degree. He believed Jesus was saying there is a right time for listening, learning instead of wasting time on things of the flesh.

A rather humorous anecdote from the Sayings of the Desert Fathers (Apophthegmata Patrum) dating to the 4th century relates the story of an ascetic monk who refused to perform any labor. The abbot shut him in a cell without food but with a book. When the monk inquired as to whether anyone had eaten, the abbot replied "Because you are a spiritual man and do not need that kind of food. We being carnal want to eat and that is why we work. But you have chosen the good portion and read the whole day long and do not want to eat carnal food." The monk apologized and acknowledged "Mary needs Martha. It is really thanks to Martha that Mary is praised" ((Apophthegmata Patrum, Silvanus 5).

Cyril of Alexandria (died 444) equated Martha with the Jews and Mary with Christians for whom only one thing was necessary for salvation.[2]

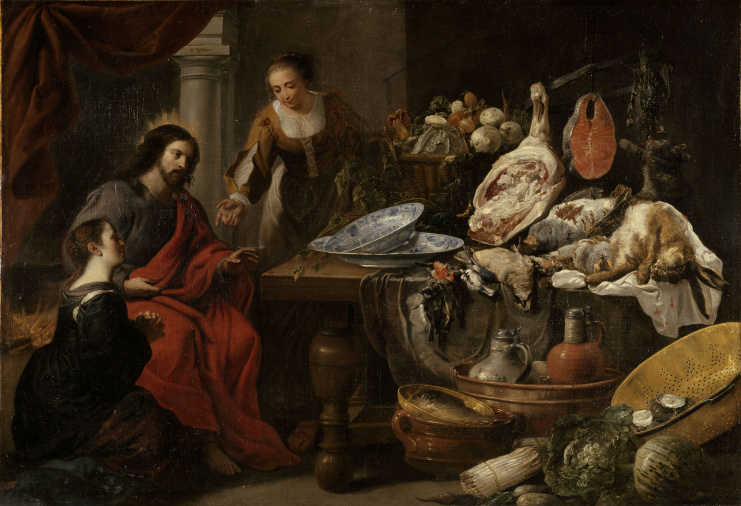
Jesus in the House of Martha and Mary by Erasmus Quellinus II and Jan Fyt

One popular interpretation of this story comes from Augustine of Hippo (354–430). Augustine argued that Martha represents the church of the present which will someday pass away. For Augustine, Martha's decision to toil away in active service is futile because it will no longer be needed after death. On the other hand, Mary's decision to remain at the feet of Jesus represents the church of the future because being in the presence of Jesus will continue into the next world. Susan Rakoczy points out that this might have been an expression of Augustine's own desire to spend more time in contemplation and prayer rather than being consumed with the busy work of a church leader and theologian. Regardless of his intentions this interpretation has been injurious to the lives of those who place themselves within this "hierarchy of values."

Gregory the Great (died 604) said that while the contemplative life had greater merit than the active life, the most desirable state was the union of them.

Bernard of Clairvaux (died 1153) compared Martha to Mary the mother of Jesus who received Jesus in her earthly womb while sister Mary was preparing the receive the heavenly Christ.

Thomas Aquinas (died 1272) found virtue in both: "There are many arguments to support the position that the contemplative life is superior to the active, but that in some circumstances and in some particular respect, the active life has to be given preference because of the needs of the present life."

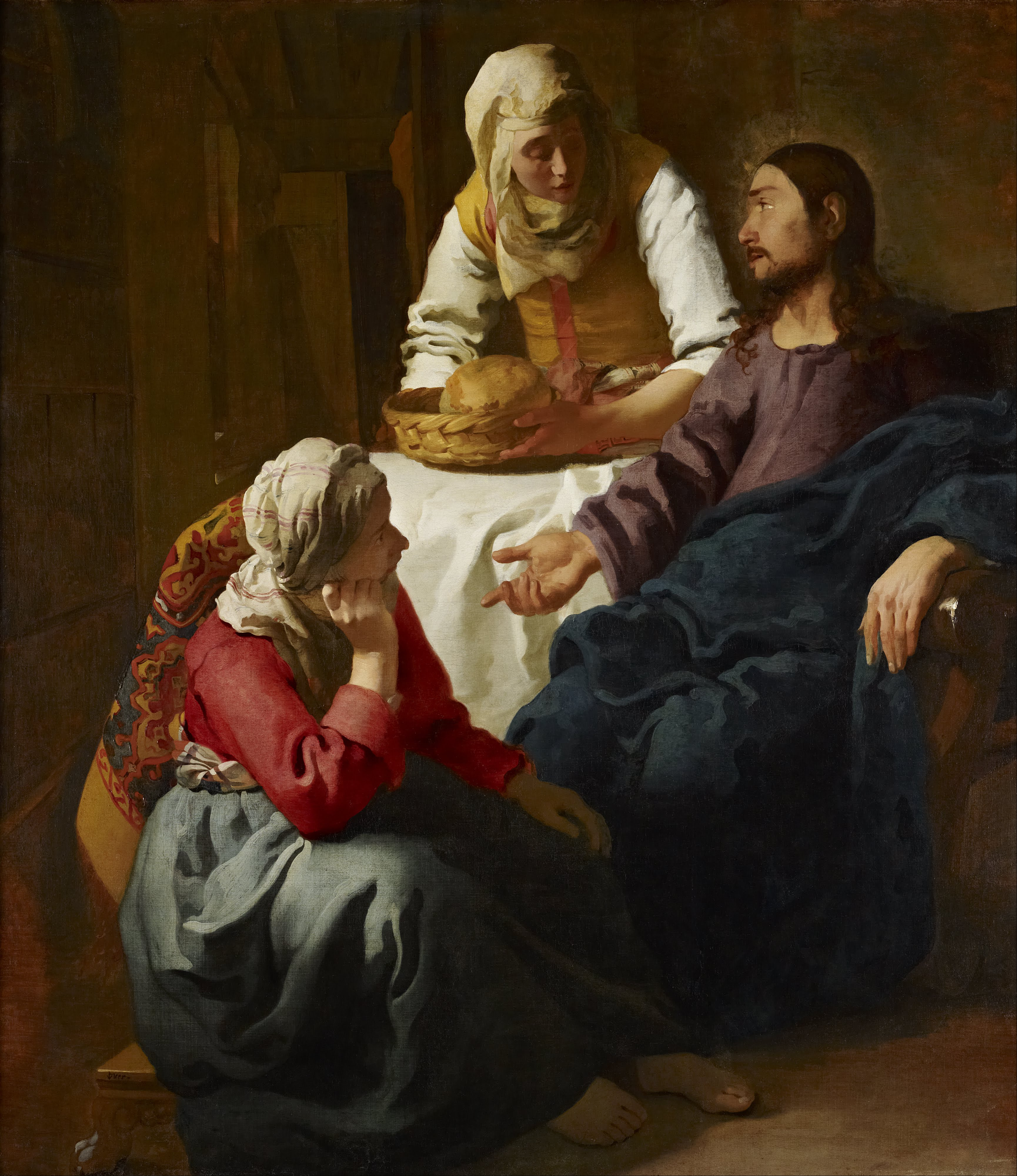
Christ in the House of Martha and Mary (Vermeer), 1655

Meister Eckhart (1260–1328) has offered another interpretation of this story that identifies Martha as being the more spiritually advanced of the two sisters. Advocating for this interpretation, Matthew Fox writes, "Compassion and the works born of compassion are themselves acts of contemplation." Eckhart sees Martha as having a higher level of perfection because she knew that activity does not hinder the life of prayer and contemplation; rather what one does flows directly from one's experience of God. Economist Henry Ergas sees this interpretation as "the uniquely Western sacralisation of hard work, thrift and aspiration".

Catherine of Siena (died 1380), having spent several years in complete isolation and prayer and believing she had become the bride of Christ in a mystical marriage, had a vision that she must venture out to help the poor. Resisting this, in another vision, the Lord told her she must "walk with two feet of love", describing the unity of prayer and action.

Teresa of Avila (died 1582), the Spanish Carmelite nun, mystic and reformer, compared Martha and Mary to a castle with its many rooms as dimensions of a journey until one reaches a mystical union and spiritual marriage in the upper tower. Martha and Mary must join together to host the Lord, she wrote. She rejected a rigid hierarchy of the set of contemplative acts being superior to the other kind. She was writing about the same time as the Council of Trent (1545–1563) marking the Catholic Church's Counter Reformation. One of the outcomes was emphasis on the importance of work as well as faith for salvation, contrasting with the Protestant elevation of "by faith alone".

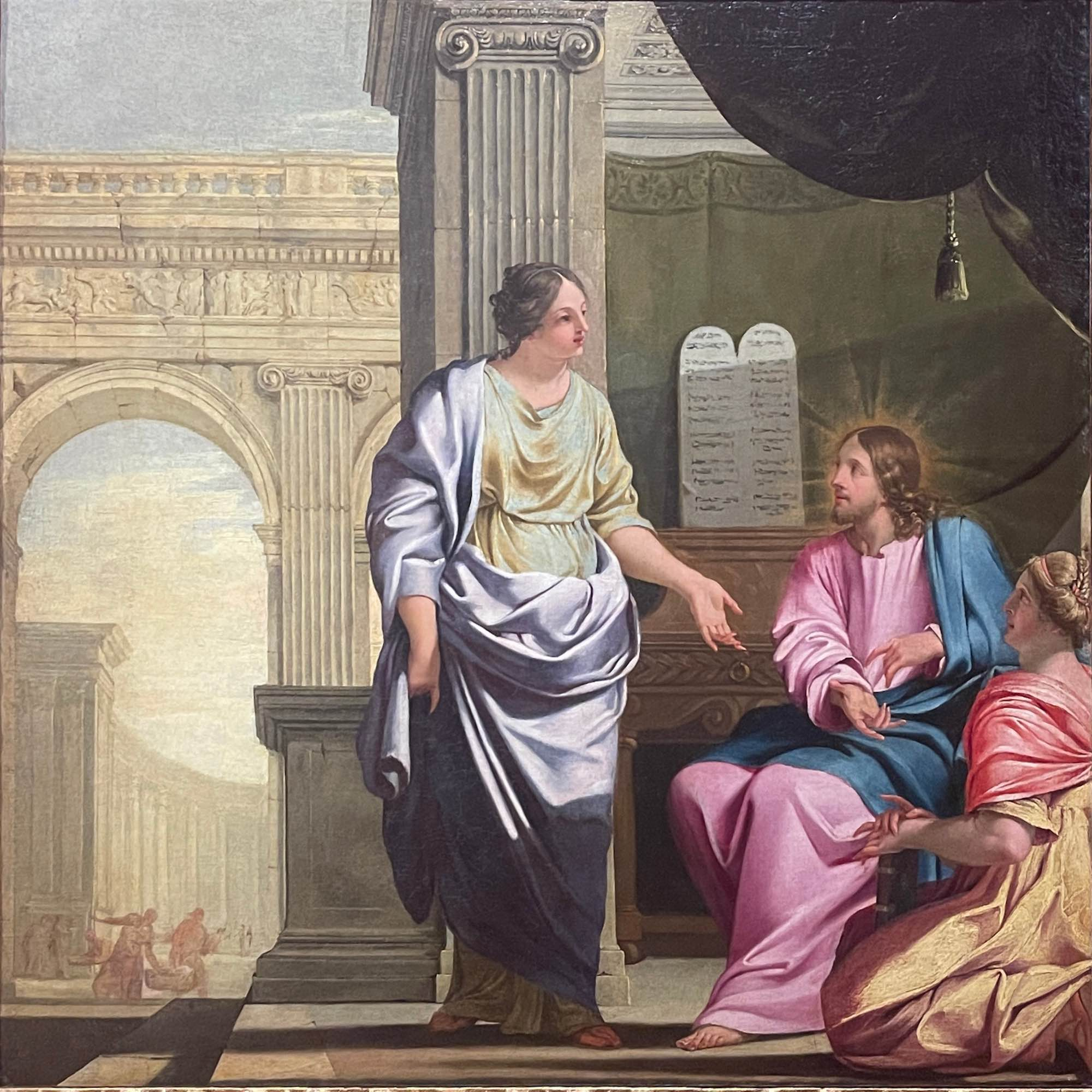
Christ at the house of Mary and Martha by Michel Corneille, 1650

The German theologian Friedrich Justus Knecht gives the typical interpretation of this passage, writing: "The story of the Good Samaritan gave us an example of the love of our neighbour. In Martha and Mary we have a model of the true love of God. Both sisters loved our Divine Lord, but they showed their love in different ways. Mary was all absorbed, listening to and meditating on His words; and, carried out of herself by her love of Him, she forgot everything else. Martha, on the other hand, was taken up with active work in His service, and could only think of how she might most perfectly minister to His wants. Martha spent herself in her efforts to prepare food for our Lord, while Mary was entirely occupied in being fed by Him... Like Martha we ought to do our best to fulfil the duties of our state of life: but we should not, on this account, neglect to hear and meditate on the divine word. 'These things you ought to have done, and not leave those undone' (Matt. 23:23). Pray and work!"

The diversity of modern interpretations includes a number of female voices as part of the larger conversation. Among these voices are women interpreters such as Elizabeth Schüssler Fiorenza, Mary Rose D'Angelo, and Barbara Reid. Sook Ja Chung argues that a feminist reading of this passage must take into account the perspective of women, especially those who have been oppressed, and must understand that a traditional patriarchal reading of this passage can be problematic as it diminishes the value of Martha's role in saying she is focusing on the wrong things.

== Later depictions ==
=== Art ===
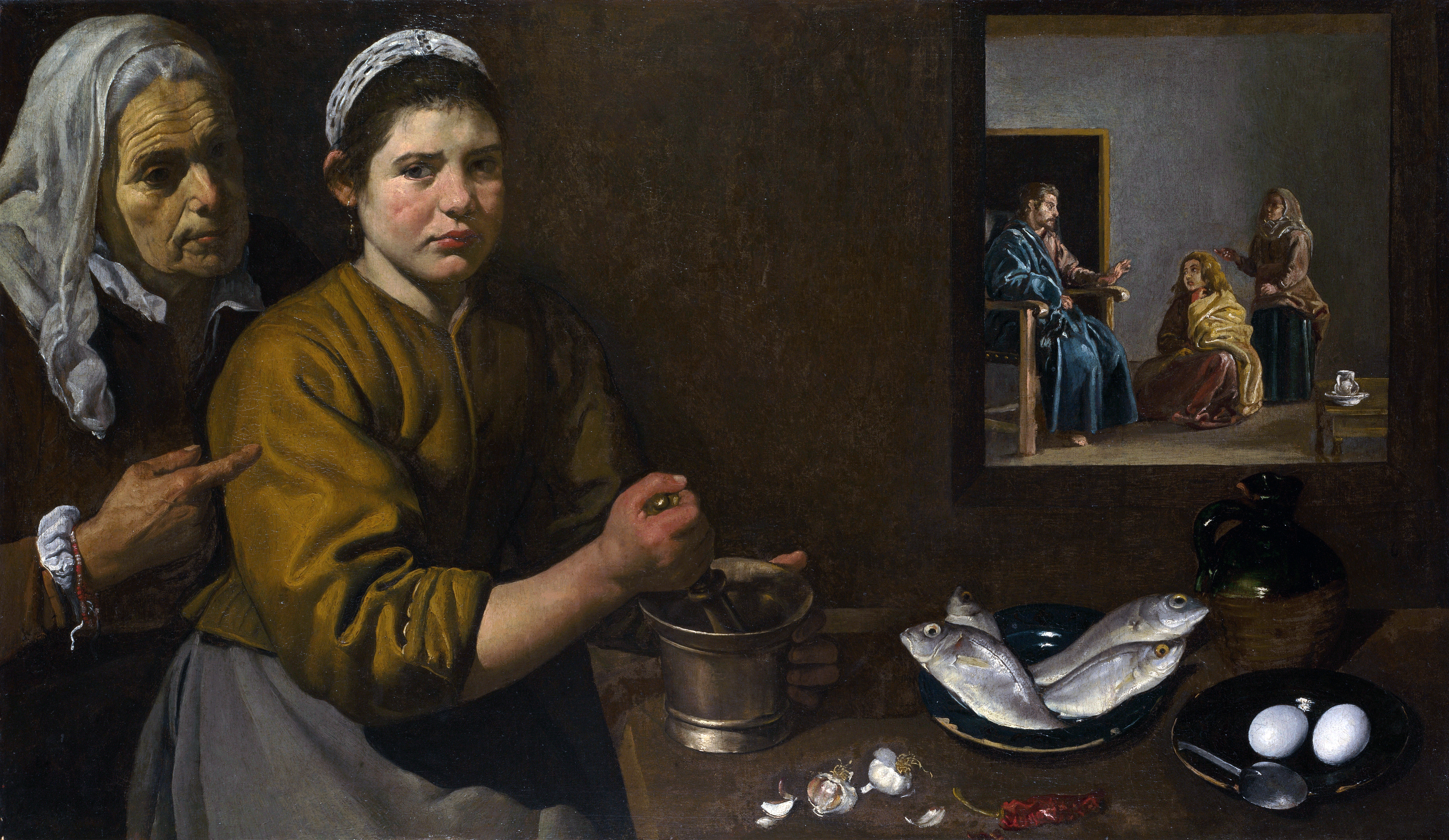
Christ in the House of Martha and Mary, Velázquez, 1618

The episode is mostly found in the life of Christ in art from the Counter-Reformation onwards, especially in the 17th century, when the domestic setting is usually given a realistic depiction, and the subject appears as a single work rather than in cycles of the Life of Christ, or the life of Mary Magdalene. However, it appears in some Ottonian manuscript cycles, including the one in the Pericopes of Henry II (c. 1002–1012), where it is given a hieratic architectural setting. Many paintings show Mary washing, or just having washed, Jesus's feet, recalling the story in John 12.1–8 (which seems to be about Mary of Bethany). Via the story in Luke 7.36–50 (about an unnamed 'sinful woman'), however, Mary of Bethany was often conflated with Mary Magdalene, and this too may be reflected in art. Artists depicting the subject include Velázquez, Rembrandt, Vermeer, Caravaggio and Rubens.

Individual works with articles include:

- Christ in the House of Martha and Mary – an early work by the Spanish painter Velázquez
- Christ in the House of Martha and Mary – by Vermeer
- Christ at the home of Mary and Martha – by Henry Ossawa Tanner, 1905.

A variant subject, without Christ, is exemplified by Caravaggio's Martha and Mary Magdalene. This relies on the conflation of Mary of Bethany with Mary Magdalene, and the tradition of the loose life of the latter. It shows Martha reproving her "sister" for her lifestyle. Other works may be titled The Conversion of Mary Magdalen.

=== Literature ===
Rudyard Kipling's poem "The Sons of Martha", Kipling defends people who dedicate themselves to work like Martha.

In his book The Doors of Perception, Aldous Huxley alludes to the story of Mary and Martha, addressing the distinction between what he terms "the way of Mary" and "the way of Martha". Huxley notes that, during his experiences with mescaline, time seems to stand still, and contemplation—the way of Mary—rules the day. Quotidian cares fall to the wayside. In one passage, Huxley writes, "Mescalin opens up the way of Mary, but shuts the door on that of Martha."

In the novel Time Enough for Love by Robert A. Heinlein, the character Minerva says, "I am a Martha, Lazarus, not her sister Mary." This, as a response to another character's attempt to describe her appearance, is a testament to her pride in being practically minded.

In the novel The Handmaid's Tale by Margaret Atwood, the women servants of the dystopian society (doing the cooking and cleaning) are called "marthas".

== See also ==
- Gospel harmony
- List of names for the biblical nameless
- Women in the Bible
