= Christ in the House of Martha and Mary (Velázquez) =

Painting by Diego Velázquez

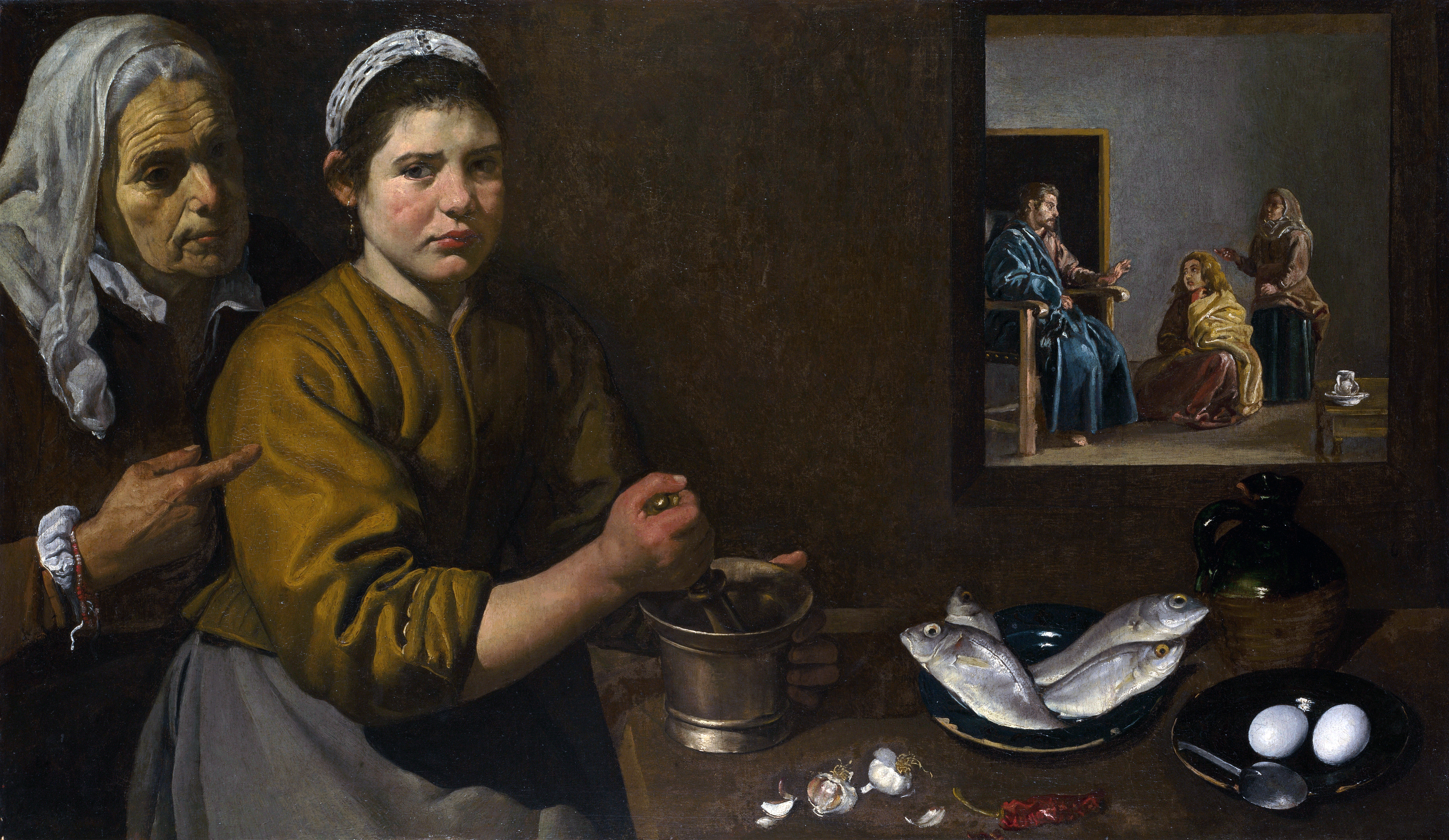
- Artist: Diego Velázquez
- Year: 1618
- Medium: Oil on canvas
- Dimensions: 63 cm × 103.5 cm (25 in × 40.7 in)
- Location: National Gallery; London

Christ in the House of Martha and Mary is an oil-on-canvas painting by the Spanish artist Diego Velázquez, dating to his Seville period, now in the National Gallery, London. It was probably painted in 1618 (it is dated, but the "8" is "fragmentary" and uncertain), shortly after he completed his apprenticeship with Pacheco. At this time, Velázquez was experimenting with the potential of the bodegones, a form of genre painting set in taverns (the meaning of bodegon) or kitchens which was frequently used to relate scenes of contemporary Spain to themes and stories from the Bible. Often they contained depictions of people working with food and drink.

== Description and interpretation ==
Velázquez has painted the interior of a kitchen with two half-length women to the left; the one on the left appeared in his Old Woman Cooking Eggs from the same period. On the table are a number of foods, perhaps the ingredients of an aioli (a garlic mayonnaise made to accompany fish). These have been prepared by the maid. Extremely realistic, they were probably painted from the artist's own household as they appear in other bodegones from the same time.

In the usual interpretation, the background scene is Christ in the House of Martha and Mary, described in Luke 10:38–42; the story of Martha and Mary. In it, Christ goes to the house of a woman named Martha. Her sister, Mary, sat at his feet and listened to him speak. Martha, on the other hand, went to "make all the preparations that had to be made". Upset that Mary did not help her, she complained to Christ to which he responded: "Martha, Martha, ... you are worried and upset about many things, but only one thing is needed. Mary has chosen what is better, and it will not be taken away from her." In the painting, Christ is shown as a bearded man in a blue tunic. He gesticulates at Martha, the woman standing behind Mary, rebuking her for her frustration.

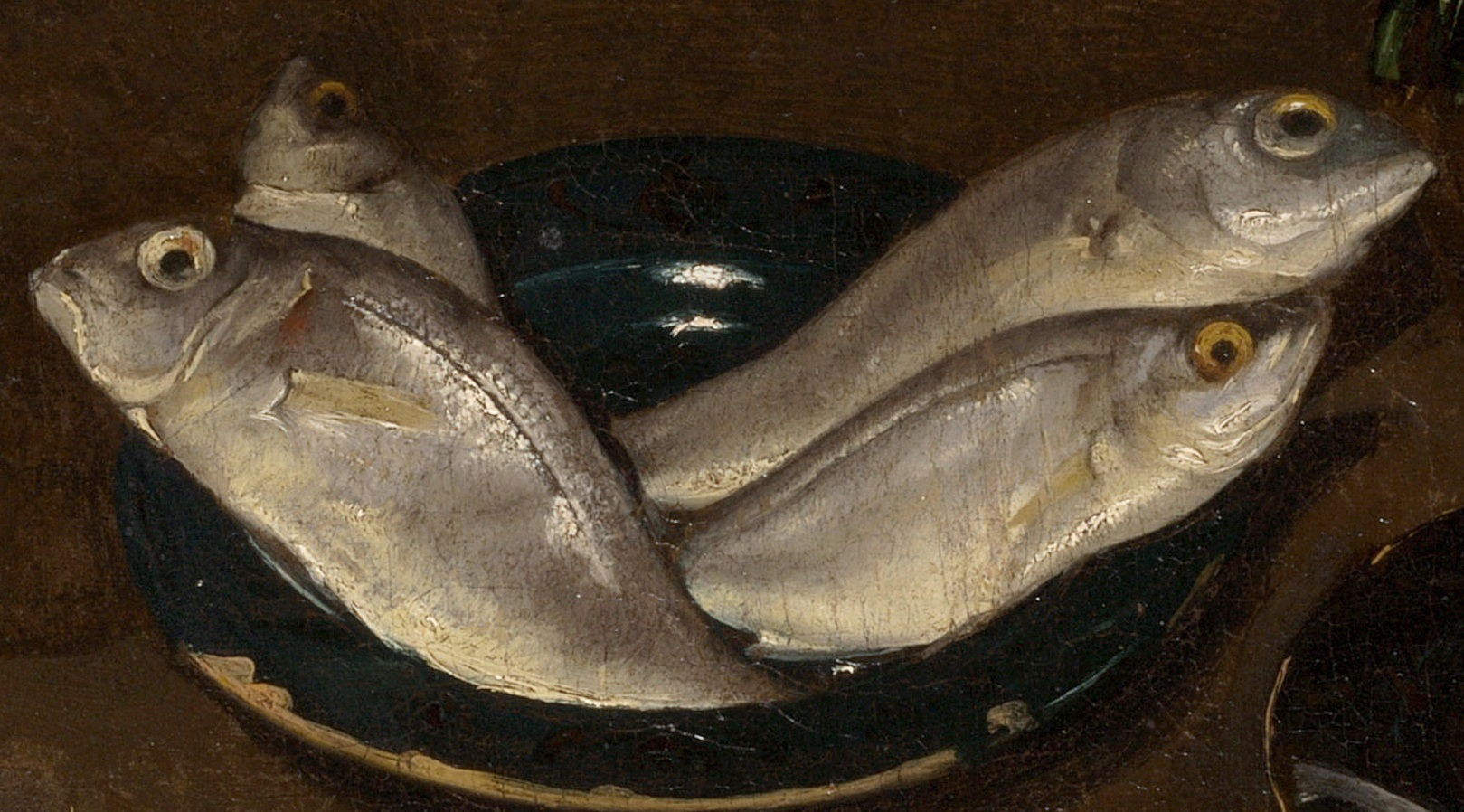
The foods are shown prepared in ways typical of Spanish cookery at the time. His painstaking attention to detail show how important Velázquez considered it to represent realistic scenes.

The plight of Martha clearly relates to that of the maid in the foreground. She has just prepared a large amount of food and, from the redness of her creased puffy cheeks, she is also upset. To comfort her (or perhaps even to rebuke her), the elderly woman indicates the scene in the background reminding her that she cannot expect to gain fulfillment from work alone. The maid, who cannot bring herself to look directly at the biblical scene and instead looks out of the painting towards viewers, meditates on the implications of the story, which for a theologically alert contemporary audience included the traditional superiority of the vita contemplativa (spiritual life) over the vita activa (temporal life). Saint Augustine had drawn this moral from the story in the 5th century, followed by countless other divines. In the Counter-Reformation the usefulness of the "active life" was somewhat upgraded by many writers to counter Lutheran assertions of the spiritual adequacy of "faith alone".

This is the most likely interpretation of the painting. However, scholars have given other readings of it. Some have argued over the identities of the characters, suggesting that the maid in the foreground is actually Martha herself and the lady standing in the background is just an incidental character.

Another point of contention is the representation of the background. On the one hand, it may be a mirror or a view through a hatch at the biblical scene. If so, it would imply that the whole painting, foreground and background, is set in Christ's time and would perhaps lend weight to the argument that the maid in the foreground is Martha. On the other hand, the biblical scene may just be a painting which is hung in the maid's kitchen. (Other scholars have even suggested that the background image is the dream or vision of the maid, because it is elevated.) Given that the bodegones usually represent images of contemporary Spain, many have thought that this is the most likely explanation. However, the National Gallery say that following cleaning and restoration in 1964, it is now clear that the smaller scene is framed by a hatch or aperture through the wall. The suggestion of other possibilities, especially that of the scene as a painting, may remain as an element in the meaning of the work.

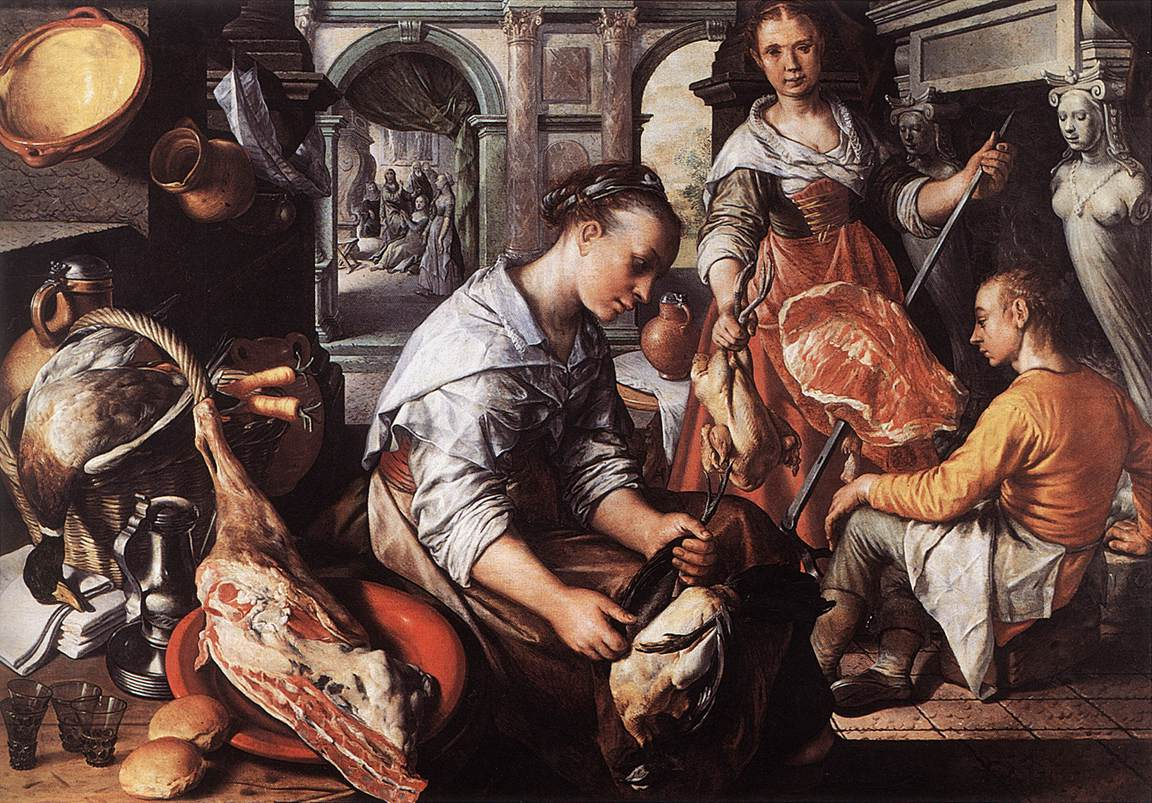
Joachim Beuckelaer, Christ in the House of Martha and Mary, 1565

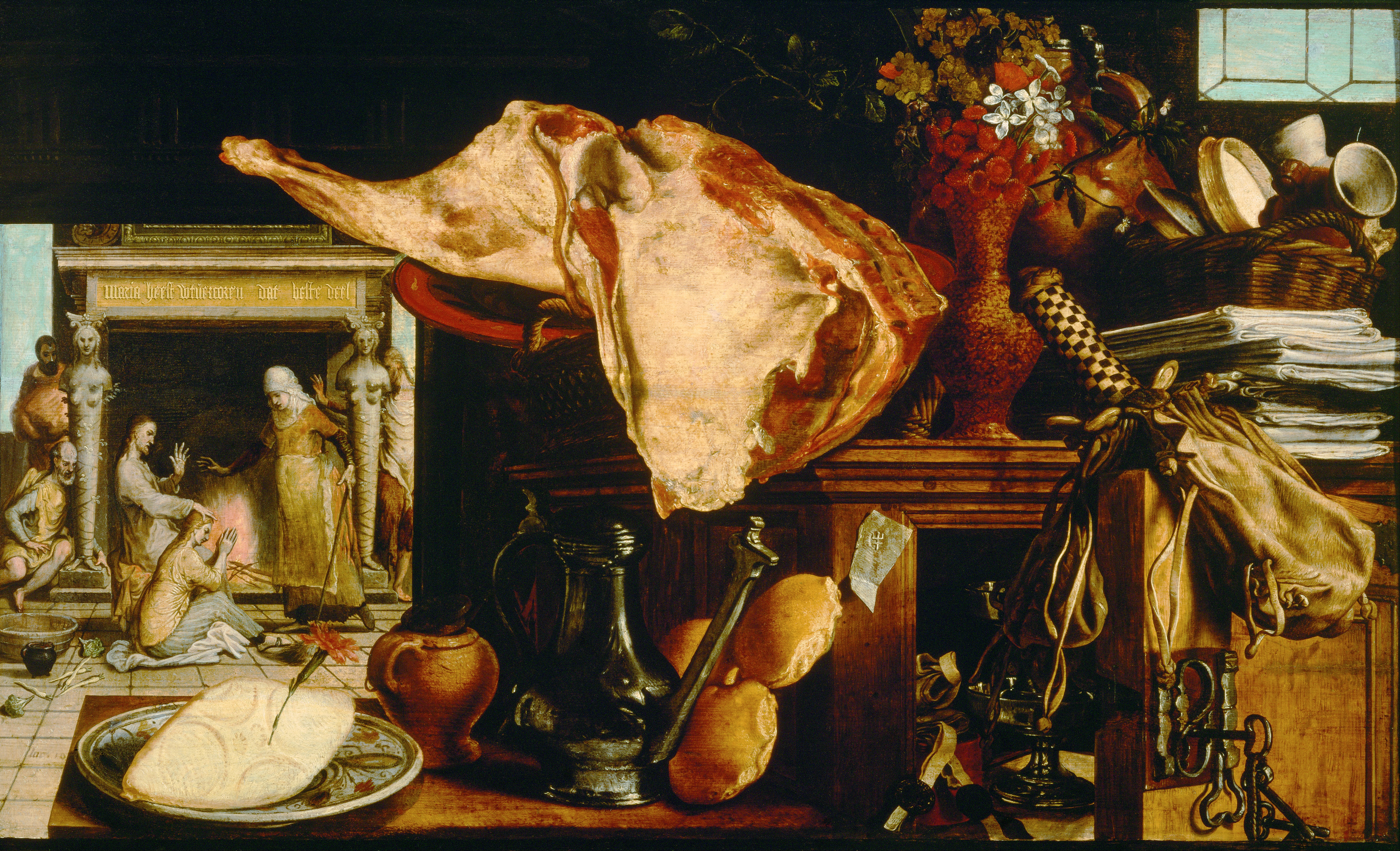
Pieter Aertsen, Vanitas with Christ in the House of Martha and Mary, 1552

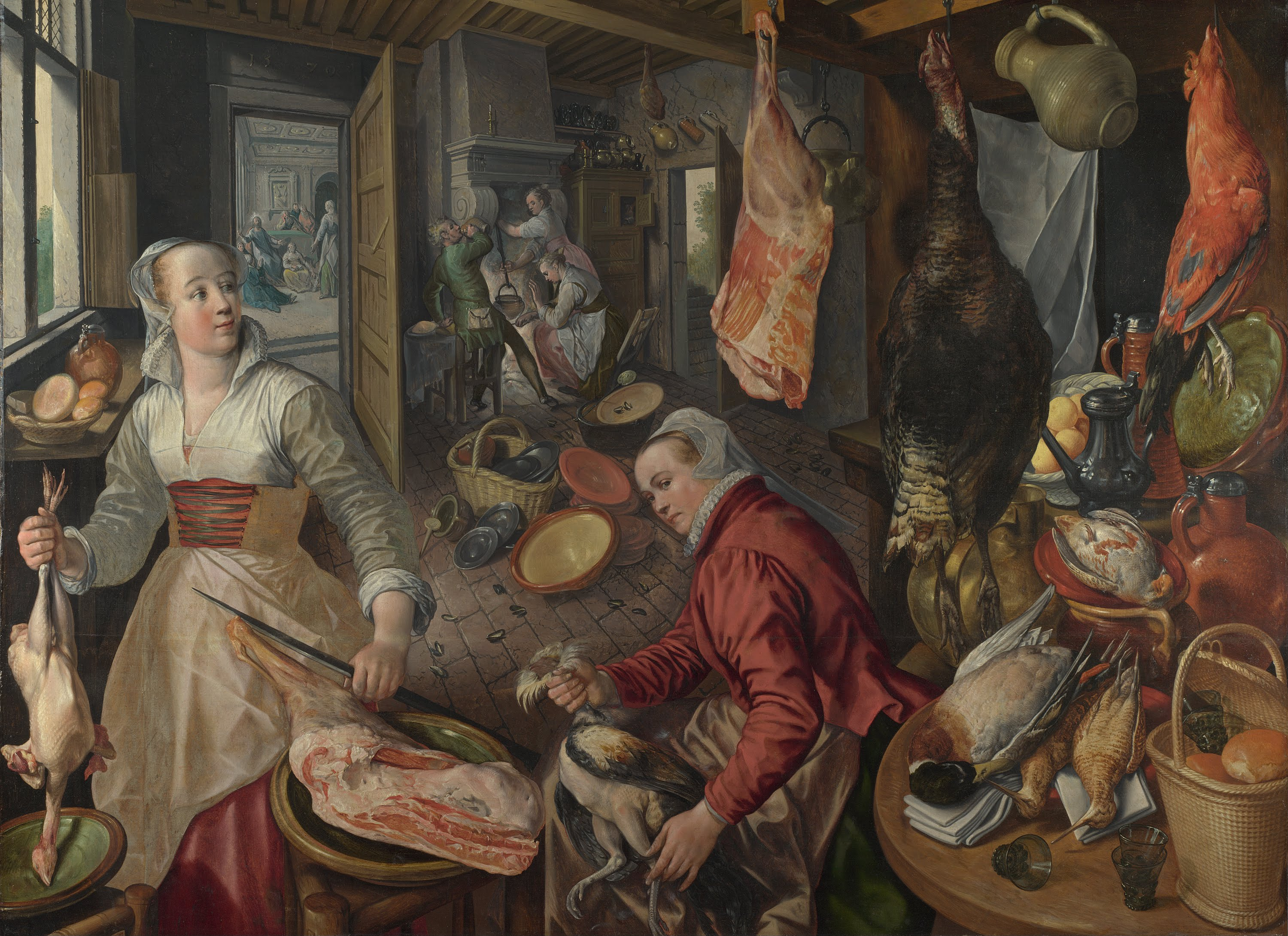
Joachim Beuckelaer, The Four Elements – Fire, 1570

Whatever the truth, the work is an early example of Velázquez's interest in layered composition, a form also known as "paintings within the painting". He continually exploited this form throughout his career. Other examples of this are Kitchen Scene with the Supper in Emmaus (1618), Las Hilanderas (1657) and his masterpiece Las Meninas (1656).

== Flemish models ==
The composition shows the influence of Flemish art from the previous century when Pieter Aertsen, followed by his nephew Joachim Beuckelaer, developed a type of large painting which combines a small New Testament scene in the background with a contemporary kitchen scene with sumptuous still life painting of foodstuffs. Several examples use Christ, Martha and Mary as the background scene, including The Four Elements: Fire, by Beuckelaer (1570), also in the National Gallery. There are two Aertsens with the same combination in the Museum Boijmans Van Beuningen, Rotterdam, and in the Kunsthistorisches Museum in Vienna a still life kitchen scene with the Martha and Mary scene again shown through a doorway, which is compared to the Velázquez by MacLaren (illustrated). Another Beuckelaer painting (illustrated) in the Royal Museums of Fine Arts of Belgium, Brussels, shows in the foreground a kitchen scene with still live meat and maids, and through a passage the scene with Christ and the sisters in near-grisaille. Martha is presumably the figure nearest the viewer who seems to be on her way to the kitchen. There is a third Beuckelaer in the Rijksmuseum, Amsterdam. It is very likely that Velázquez had seen engravings of these or similar works.

== Provenance ==
This may be the work listed as by Velázquez in an inventory of 1637 of the house of Fernando Afán de Ribera, duke of Alcalá de los Gazules, who died that year. It was described as "a kitchen where a woman is pounding garlic" without mention of the religious scene. It reached England probably already owned by Lt. Col. Henry Packe, who fought in the Peninsular War, and after the death of his son William in 1880 was auctioned at Christie's in 1881. It was bought by Sir William Henry Gregory, who bequeathed it to the National Gallery in 1892.

== See also ==
- List of works by Diego Velázquez
