= The Sons of Martha =

Poem by Rudyard Kipling

"The Sons of Martha" is a poem written by Rudyard Kipling. It is inspired by the biblical story of Jesus at the home of Martha and Mary. It celebrates the care and dedication of workers – engineers, mechanics, and builders – to provide for the safety and comfort of others.

"The Sons of Martha" was written in 1907 and was adopted by the author in 1922 to be part of the Ritual of the Calling of an Engineer performed by Canadian engineers at their graduation.

In the Bible story, Christ visits a home where two sisters, Mary and Martha, live. Mary sits at the visitor's feet to listen to him while Martha races about attending to the hospitality until her patience runs out, and Martha calls on Jesus to direct Mary to help her. Jesus chides Martha for her mundane concerns and tells her: "Mary has chosen what is better".
