= Christ in the House of Martha and Mary (Vermeer) =

Painting by Johannes Vermeer

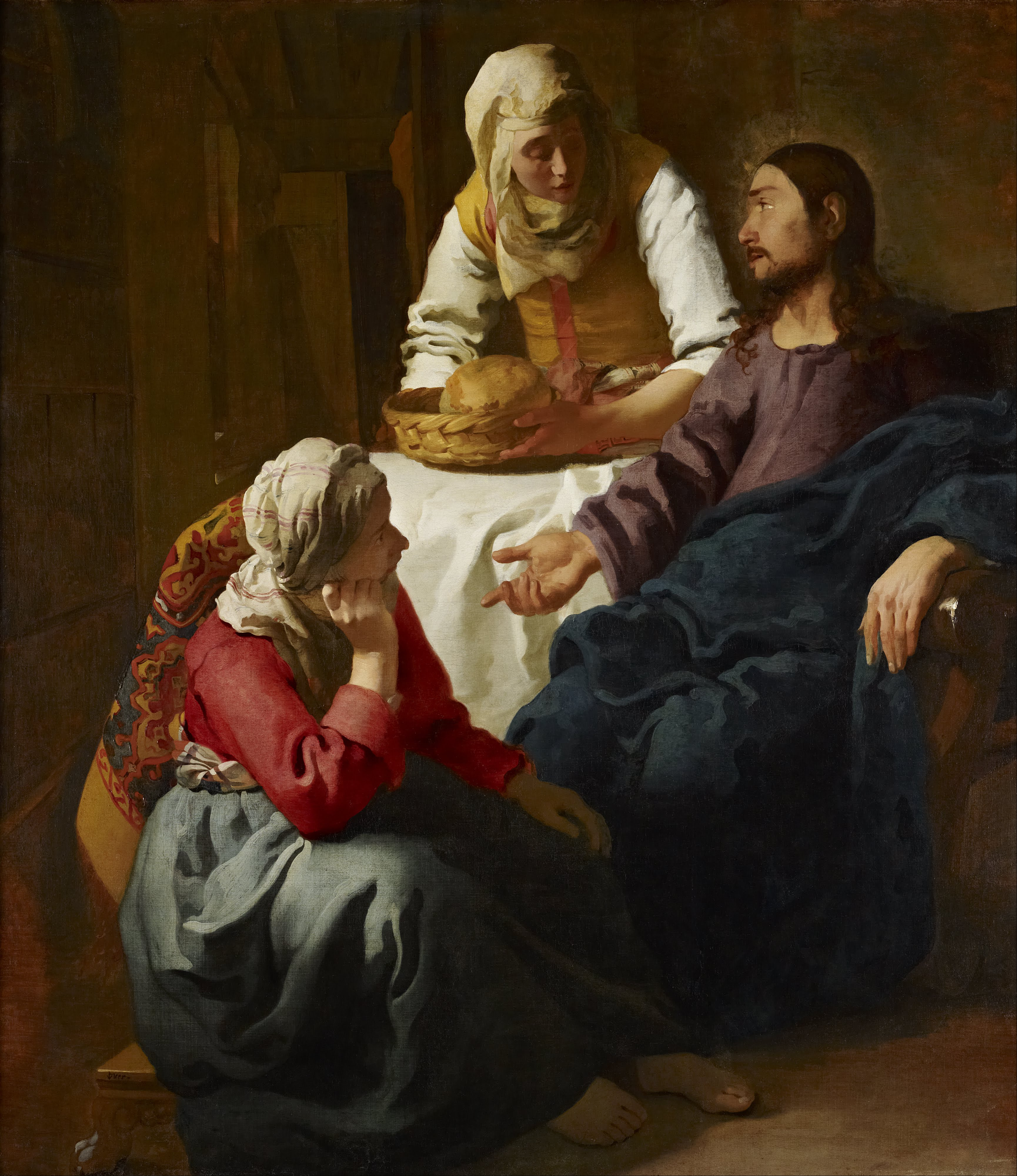
- Artist: Johannes Vermeer
- Year: c. 1655
- Medium: Oil on canvas
- Dimensions: 160 cm × 142 cm (63 in × 56 in)
- Location: Scottish National Gallery, Edinburgh

Christ in the House of Martha and Mary (Dutch: Christus in het huis van Martha en Maria) is an oil painting finished in 1655 by the Dutch Golden Age painter Johannes Vermeer. It is now in the Scottish National Gallery in Edinburgh. It is the largest painting by Vermeer (63in x 56in) and one of the very few with an overt religious subject. The story of Christ visiting the household of the two sisters Mary of Bethany and Martha goes back to the New Testament. The work has also been called Christ in the House of Mary and Martha (reversing the last two names).

== Painting materials ==
The pigment analysis of this painting reveals the use of the pigments of the baroque period such as madder lake, yellow ochre, vermilion and lead white. Vermeer did not paint the robe of Christ with his usual blue pigment of choice ultramarine (see for example The Milkmaid) but with a mixture of smalt, indigo and lead white.

== See also ==
- List of paintings by Johannes Vermeer
- Dutch Golden Age painting
