= Martha =

Biblical figure

Saint Martha of Bethany
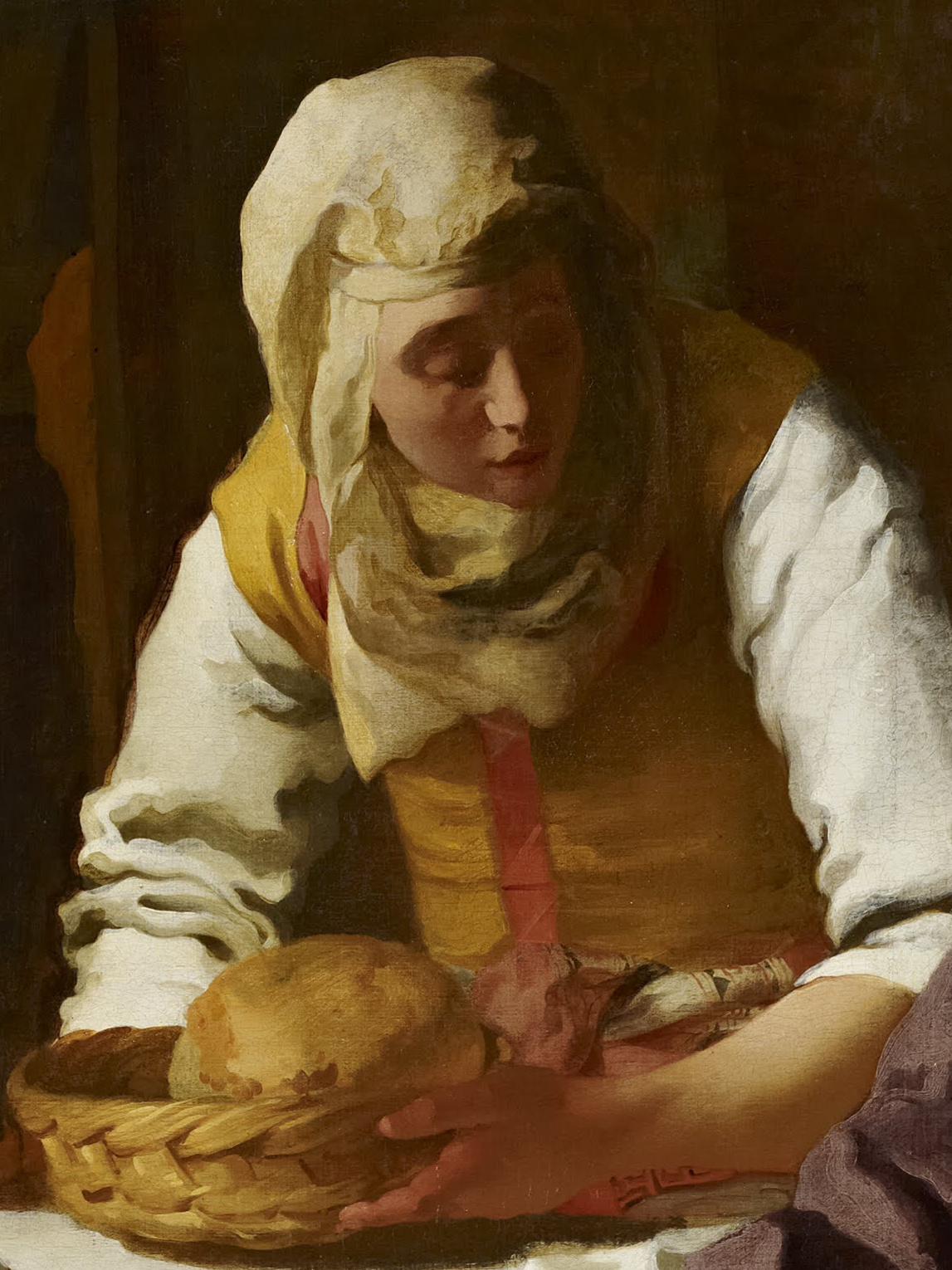
- Detail from Christ in the House of Martha and Mary by Vermeer, before 1654–1655

Virgin
- Born: probably Iudaea Province, Roman Empire
- Died: traditionally Larnaca, Cyprus, Roman Empire or Tarascon, Gallia Narbonensis, Roman Empire
- Venerated in: Catholic Church; Eastern Christianity; Anglican Communion; Lutheran Church
- Canonized: Pre-congregation
- Feast: 29 July (Catholic, Anglican, Lutheran), 4 June (Eastern Orthodox)
- Attributes: broom; keys; Tarasque;
- Patronage: butlers; cooks; dieticians; domestic servants; homemakers; hotel-keepers; housemaids; housewives; innkeepers; laundry workers; maids; servants; servers; single laywomen; travellers; Tarascon; Villajoyosa, Spain; Pateros, Philippines; Malagasang II, Imus, Philippines

Martha (Aramaic: מָרְתָא) is a biblical figure described in the Gospels of Luke and John. Together with her siblings Lazarus and Mary of Bethany, she is described as living in the village of Bethany near Jerusalem and witnessing Jesus resurrecting her brother, Lazarus.

== Etymology of the name ==
The name Martha is a Latin transliteration of the Koine Greek Μάρθα, itself a transliteration of the Aramaic מָרְתָא Mârtâ, "the mistress" or "the lady", from מרה "mistress", feminine of מר "master." The Aramaic form occurs in a Nabatean inscription found at Puteoli, and now in the Naples Museum; it is dated AD 5 (Corpus Inscr. Semit., 158); also in a Palmyrene inscription, where the Greek translation has the form Marthein.

== Biblical references ==
In an episode from the Gospel of Luke, Jesus visits the home of two sisters named Mary and Martha. While Martha is "encumbered about many things" as she worriedly attends to their home and guest, Mary had chosen "the better part" by sitting at Jesus's feet and receiving his teachings with attention. The name of their village is not recorded, nor (unlike in John 11:18) is there any mention of whether Jesus was near Jerusalem. Biblical commentator Heinrich Meyer notes that "Jesus cannot yet be in Bethany, where Martha and Mary dwelt [according to the Gospel of John]". However, the Cambridge Bible for Schools and Colleges claims that it was "undoubtedly Bethany".

As Jesus and his disciples were on their way, he came to a village where a woman named Martha opened her home to him. She had a sister called Mary, who sat at the Lord's feet listening to what he said. But Martha was distracted by all the preparations that had to be made. She came to him and asked, "Lord, don't you care that my sister has left me to do the work by myself? Tell her to help me!" "Martha, Martha", the Lord answered, "you are worried and upset about many things, but only one thing is needed. Mary has chosen what is better, and it will not be taken away from her."

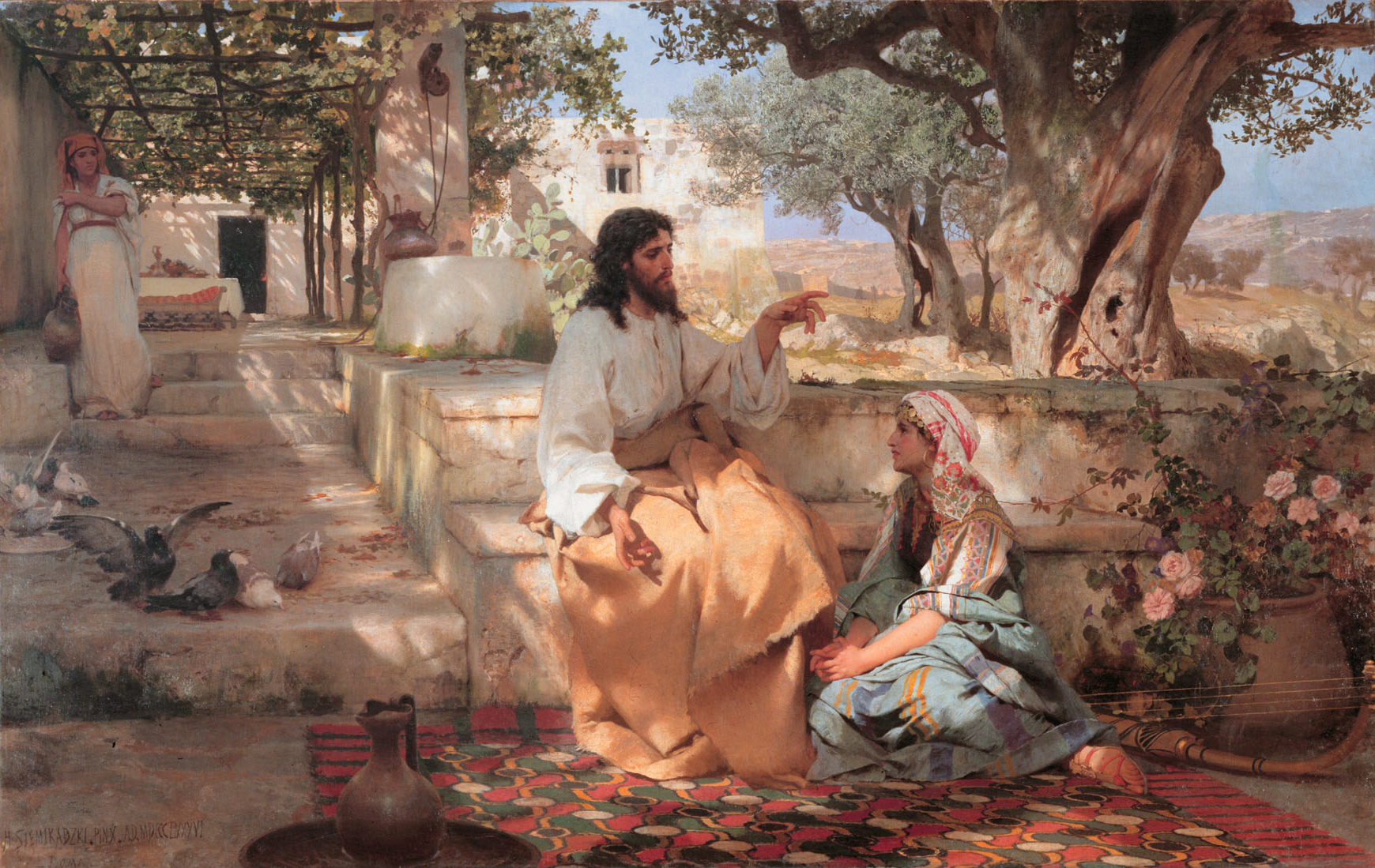
Christ in the house of Martha and Mary, by Henryk Siemiradzki, 1886

In the Gospel of John, Martha and Mary appear in connection with two incidents: the raising from the dead of their brother Lazarus (John 11) and the anointing of Jesus in Bethany (John 12:3).

In the account of the raising of Lazarus, when Jesus hears of the death it is noted that "Jesus loved Martha, and her sister, and Lazarus" (John 11:5). Upon arrival, Jesus meets with the sisters in turn: Martha followed by Mary. Martha goes immediately to meet Jesus as he arrives, while Mary waits until she is called. As one commentator notes, "Martha, the more aggressive sister, went to meet Jesus, while quiet and contemplative Mary stayed home. This portrayal of the sisters agrees with that found in Luke 10:38–42." In speaking with Jesus, both sisters lament that he did not arrive in time to prevent their brother's death: "Lord, if you had been here, my brother would not have died". But where Jesus' response to Mary is more emotional, his response to Martha is one of teaching, calling her to hope and faith:

When Martha heard that Jesus was coming, she went out to meet him, but Mary stayed at home. "Lord", Martha said to Jesus, "if you had been here, my brother would not have died. But I know that even now God will give you whatever you ask."

Jesus said to her, "Your brother will rise again." Martha answered, "I know he will rise again in the resurrection at the last day." Jesus said to her, "I am the resurrection and the life. He who believes in me will live, even though he dies; and whoever lives and believes in me will never die. Do you believe this?"

"Yes, Lord", she told him, "I believe that you are the Christ, the Son of God, who was to come into the world."

As the narrative continues, Martha calls her sister Mary to see Jesus. Jesus has Mary bring him to Lazarus' tomb where he commands the stone to be removed from its entrance. Martha objects, "But, Lord, by this time there is a bad odor, for he has been there four days." Jesus replies, "Did I not tell you that if you believed, you would see the glory of God?" They then take away the stone and Jesus prays and calls Lazarus forth alive from the tomb.

Martha appears again in John 12:1–8, where she serves at a meal held in Jesus' honor at which her brother is also a guest. The narrator only mentions that the meal takes place in Bethany, while the apparently parallel accounts in the Gospels of Matthew and Mark specify that it takes place at the home of one Simon the Leper. As the Catholic Encyclopedia notes, "We are surely justified in arguing that, since Matthew and Mark place the scene in the house of Simon, St. John must be understood to say the same; it remains to be proven that Martha could not 'serve' in Simon's house." It is at this meal that a woman (Martha's sister Mary, according to John) anoints Jesus with expensive perfume.

== Western traditions ==
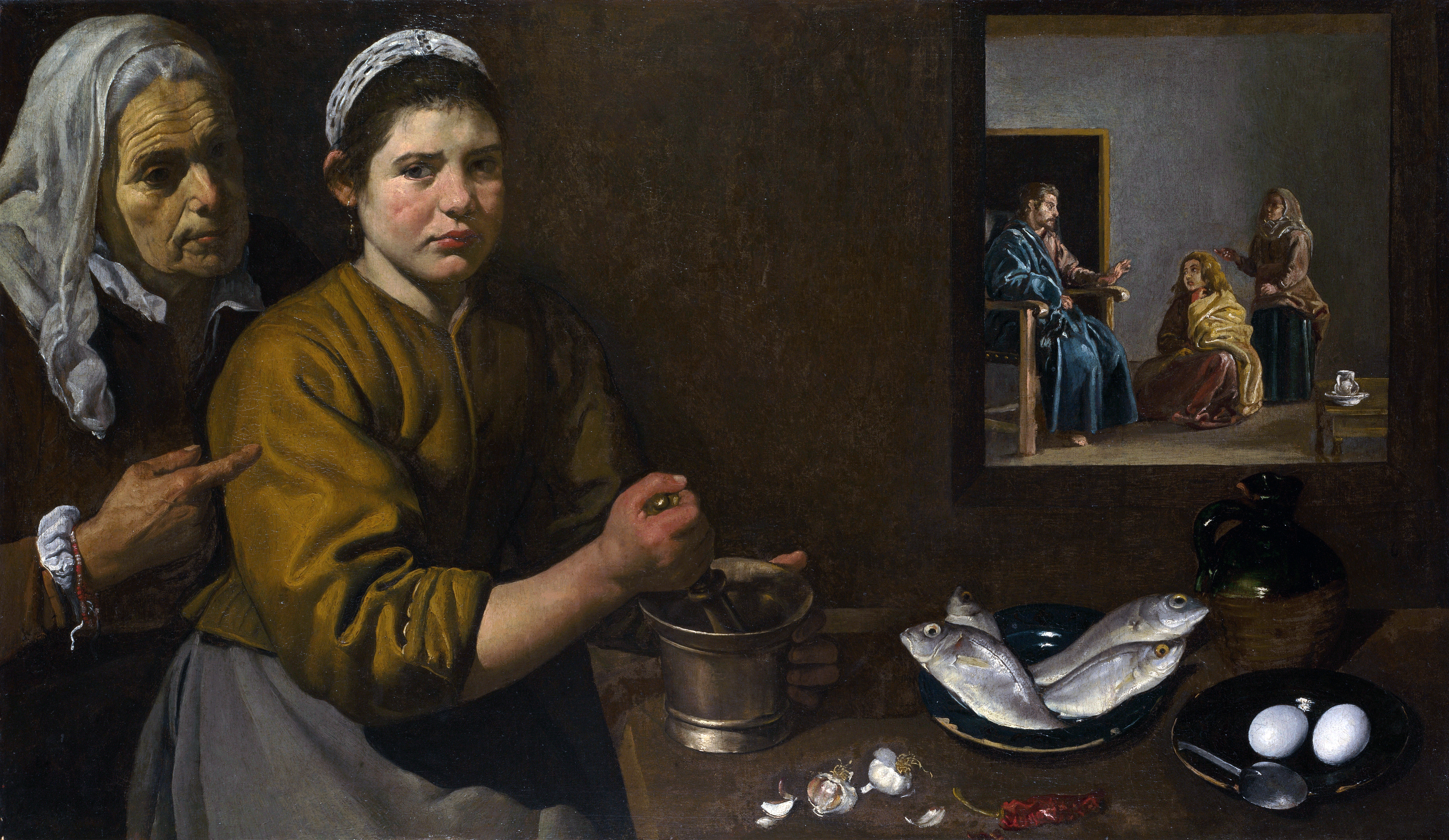
Christ in the House of Martha and Mary, Diego Velázquez, 1618

In medieval Western Christianity, Martha's sister Mary was often equated with Mary Magdalene. This identification led to additional information being attributed to Martha as well:

Mary, Martha, and Lazarus are represented by St. John as living at Bethania, but St. Luke would seem to imply that they were, at least at one time, living in Galilee; he does not mention the name of the town, but it may have been Magdala, and we should thus, supposing Mary of Bethania and Mary Magdalene to be the same person, understand the appellative "Magdalene". The words of St. John (11:1) seem to imply a change of residence for the family. It is possible, too, that St. Luke has displaced the incident referred to in Chapter 10. The likeness between the pictures of Martha presented by Luke and John is very remarkable. The familiar intercourse between the Saviour of the world and the humble family which St. Luke depicts is dwelt on by St. John when he tells us that "Jesus loved Martha, and her sister Mary, and Lazarus" (11:5). Again the picture of Martha's anxiety (John 11:20–21, 39) accords with the picture of her who was "busy about much serving" (Luke 10:40); so also in John 12:2: "They made him a supper there: and Martha served." But St. John has given us a glimpse of the other and deeper side of her character when he depicts her growing faith in Christ's Divinity (11:20–27), a faith which was the occasion of the words: "I am the resurrection and the life." The Evangelist has beautifully indicated the change that came over Martha after that interview: "When she had said these things, she went and called her sister Mary secretly, saying: The Master is come, and calleth for thee."

The Greek word used for Jesus' 'love' towards the two sisters in the Gospel of John account of the raising of Lazarus, is agapaō meaning divine or self-sacrificial love.

== Eastern Orthodox tradition ==
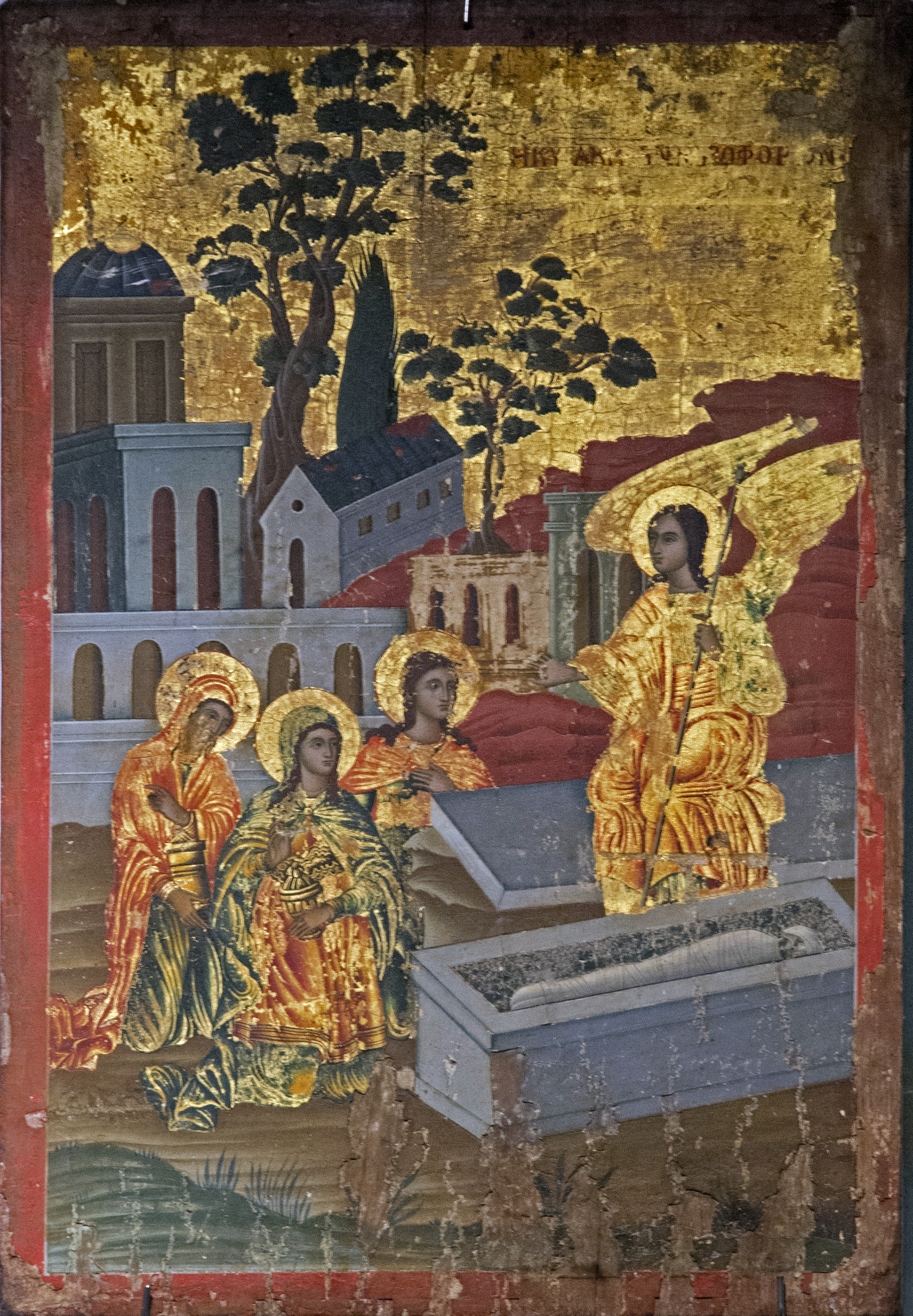
Eastern Orthodox icon depicting the Myrrhbearing Women at the Tomb of Christ

In Eastern Orthodox Church tradition, though not specifically named as such in the gospels, Martha and Mary were among the Myrrh-bearing Women. These faithful followers of Jesus stood at Golgotha during the Crucifixion of Jesus and later came to his tomb early on the morning following Sabbath with myrrh (expensive oil), according to the Jewish tradition, to anoint their Lord's body. The Myrrhbearers became the first witnesses to the Resurrection of Jesus, finding the empty tomb and hearing the joyful news from an angel.

Orthodox tradition also relates that Martha's brother Lazarus was cast out of Jerusalem in the persecution against the Jerusalem Church following the martyrdom of St. Stephen. His sister Martha fled Judea with him, assisting him in the proclaiming of the Gospel in various lands, while Mary Magdalene remained with John the Apostle and assisted him with the Church of Jerusalem. According to Cyprian tradition, Lazarus and Martha later came to Cyprus, where Lazarus became the first Bishop of Kittim (modern Larnaca). All three died in Cyprus.

== Veneration ==
Martha is venerated as a saint in the Roman Catholic Church and the Eastern Orthodox Church, and commemorated by the Lutheran Church and the Anglican Communion. Through time, as the reverence for St. Martha developed, the images of maturity, strength, common sense, and concern for others predominated.

=== Feast days ===
==== Roman Catholic ====
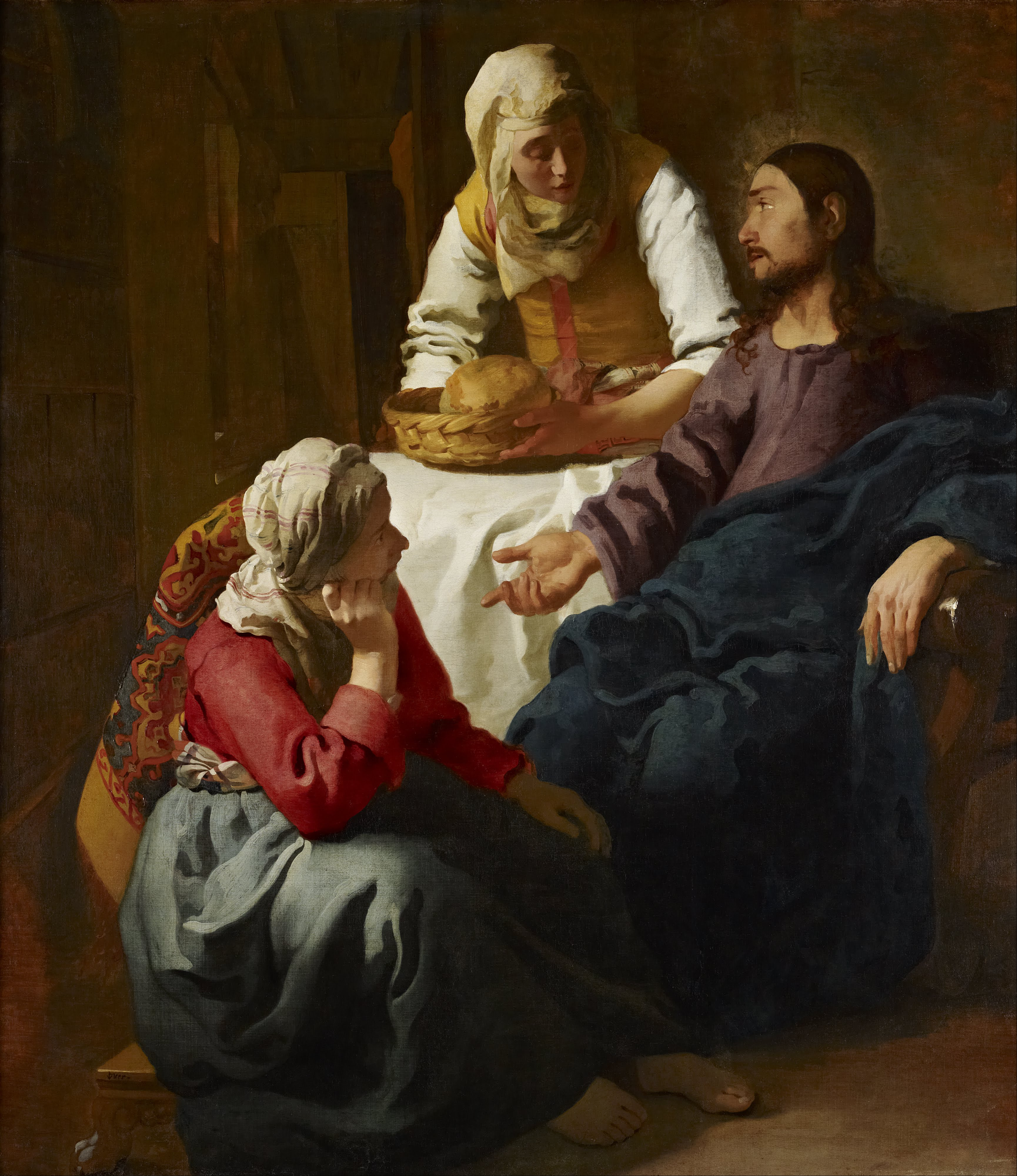
Johannes Vermeer Christ in the House of Martha and Mary, 1655

The Latin Church celebrates the feast day of Martha, Mary of Bethany and their brother Lazarus on 29 July.

The feast of Martha, classified as a "semi-double" in the Tridentine calendar, became a "simple" one in the General Roman Calendar of Pope Pius XII, a "third class feast" in the General Roman Calendar of 1960, and a memorial in the present General Roman Calendar. Until 2021, the liturgical celebration had been solely of Martha, except among the Benedictines. In that year, Pope Francis changed it to commemorate all three siblings. He further pointed out that Mary of Bethany was not to be confused with Mary Magdalene, which tradition "resulted in the inclusion of Martha alone on 29 July in the Roman Calendar".

==== Orthodoxy ====
The Eastern Orthodox and Byzantine Rite Eastern Catholic Churches commemorate Martha and her sister Mary on 4 June. They also commemorate them collectively among the Myrrh-bearing Women on the Sunday of the Myrrhbearers (the Third Sunday of Pascha – i.e., the second Sunday after Easter Sunday). Martha also figures in the commemorations of Lazarus Saturday (the day before Palm Sunday).

==== Lutheran ====
Martha is commemorated on 29 July in the Calendar of Saints of the Lutheran Church, together with Mary and Lazarus.

==== Anglican ====
Martha is also commemorated on 29 July in the Calendar of saints of the Episcopal Church.

Martha is remembered (with Mary and Lazarus) in the Church of England with a Lesser Festival on 29 July.

== Patronages ==
Diocesan Shrine of St. Martha and Parish of St. Roch in Pateros, Metro Manila, Philippines. The only shrine in southeast Asia dedicated to St. Martha.

The Sisters of Saint Martha are a religious congregation founded in Antigonish, Nova Scotia, in 1894.

=== Churches ===
Relic from the bones of Saint Martha, venerated in her Diocesan Shrine in Pateros

A number of churches are dedicated to St. Martha including:

- Roman Catholic churches
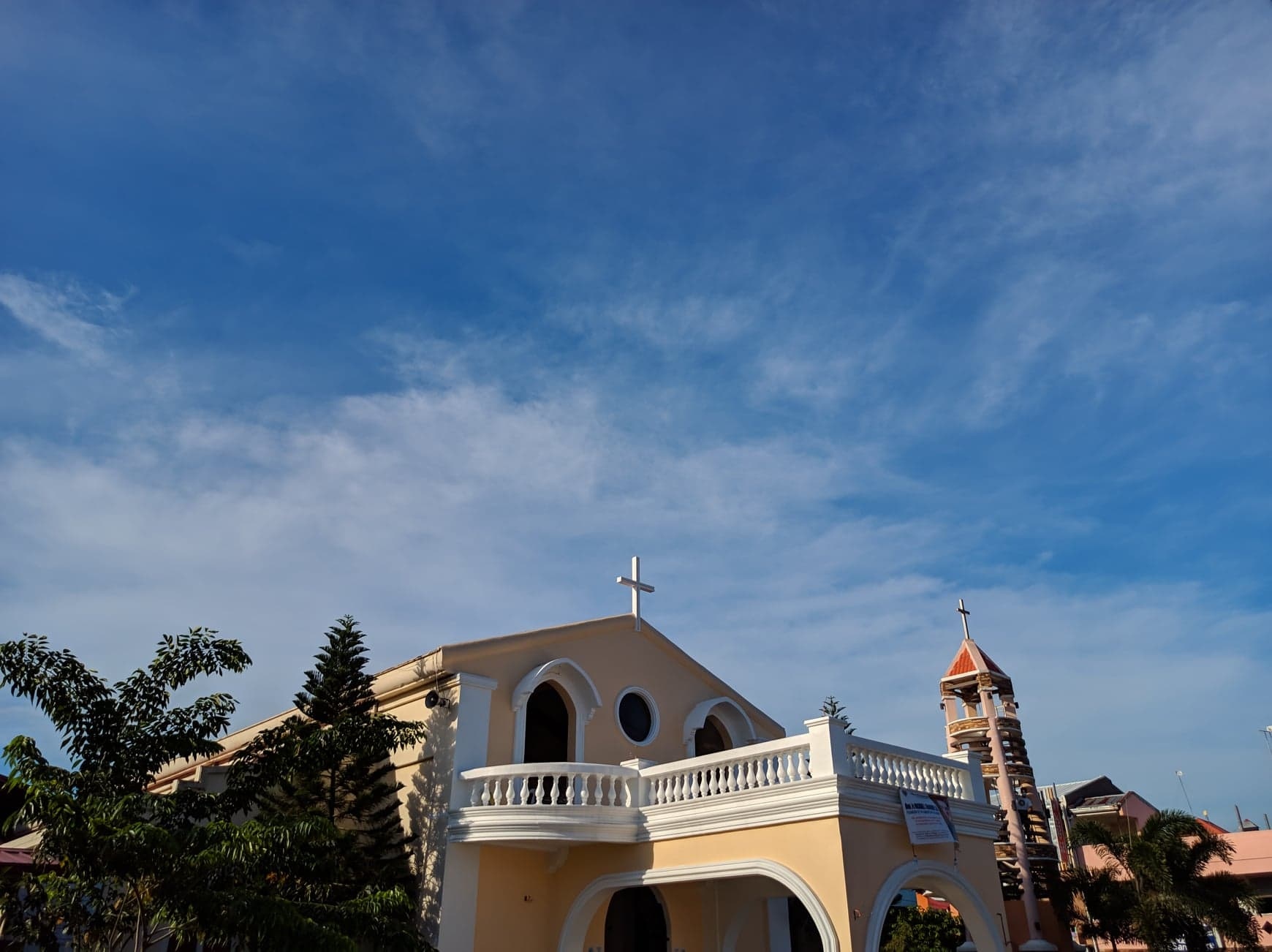
  The Parish of Saint Martha in Imus, Cavite. The only parish in the Diocese of Imus dedicated to Saint Martha.
- Europe:
    - Église Sainte-Marthe de Tarascon in Tarascon, France;
  - United States:
    - St. Martha Catholic Church in Morton Grove, Illinois, and others in East Providence, Rhode Island; Valinda, California; Kingwood, Texas; Harvey, Louisiana; Plainville, Massachusetts; Sarasota, Florida; and Prestonsburg, Kentucky
  - Asia
    - Roman Catholic Diocese of Pasig: Diocesan Shrine of St. Martha and Parish of St. Roch, Pateros, Philippines, and St. Martha Parish of Kalawaan Pasig.
    - Roman Catholic Diocese of Imus: Saint Martha Parish, Greengate Homes, Malagasang II-A, City of Imus, Province of Cavite.
- Australia:
  - Strathfield, New South Wales
- Anglican Communion:
  - Canada:
    - St Mary and St Martha in Toronto
  - England:
    - St Martha-on-the-Hill in Surrey
    - Broxtowe, Nottinghamshire
  - United States: St. Martha's Episcopal Church in:
    - Papillion, Nebraska
    - Bethany Beach, Delaware
    - Lexington, Kentucky
    - Saints Martha & Mary, Eagan, Minnesota
    - Saints Mary & Martha, Buford, GA
- Methodist:
  - St Martha's Methodist Church in Tring, Hertfordshire, England, United Kingdom
- Lutheran:
  - St. Mary and St. Martha Lutheran Church, San Francisco, United States

== Legends and myths ==
=== The Golden Legend ===
According to legend, St. Martha left Judea after Jesus' resurrection, around AD 48, and went to Provence with her sister Mary (conflated with Mary Magdalene) and her brother Lazarus. With them, Martha first settled in Avignon (now in France). The Golden Legend, compiled in the 13th century, records the Provençal tradition:

Saint Martha, hostess of our Lord Jesus Christ, was born of a royal kindred. Her father was named Syro and her mother Encharia. The father of her was duke of Syria and places maritime, and Martha with her sister possessed by the heritage of their mother three places, that was, the castle Magdalen, and Bethany and a part of Jerusalem. It is nowhere read that Martha had ever any husband nor fellowship of man, but she as a noble hostess ministered and served our Lord, and would also that her sister should serve him and help her, for she thought that all the world was not sufficient to serve such a guest. After the ascension of our Lord, when the disciples were departed, she with her brother Lazarus and her sister Mary, also Saint Maximin [actually a 3rd-century figure] which baptized them, and to whom they were committed of the Holy Ghost, and many others, were put into a ship without sail, oars, or rudder governail, of the paynims, which by the conduct of our Lord they came all to Marseille, and after came to the territory of Aquense or Aix, and there converted the people to the faith. Martha was right facound of speech, and courteous and gracious to the sight of the people.

The Golden Legend also records the grand lifestyle imagined for Martha and her siblings in its entry on Mary Magdalene:

Mary Magdalene had her surname of Magdala, a castle, and was born of right noble lineage and parents, which were descended of the lineage of kings. And her father was named Cyrus, and her mother Eucharis. She with her brother Lazarus, and her sister Martha, possessed the castle of Magdala, which is two miles from Nazareth, and Bethany, the castle which is nigh to Jerusalem, and also a great part of Jerusalem, which, all these things they departed among them. In such wise that Mary had the castle Magdala, whereof she had her name Magdalene. And Lazarus had the part of the city of Jerusalem, and Martha had to her part Bethany. And when Mary gave herself to all delights of the body, and Lazarus entended all to knighthood, Martha, which was wise, governed nobly her brother's part and also her sister's, and also her own, and administered to knights, and her servants, and to poor men, such necessities as they needed. Nevertheless, after the ascension of our Lord, they sold all these things.

=== St. Martha in Tarascon ===
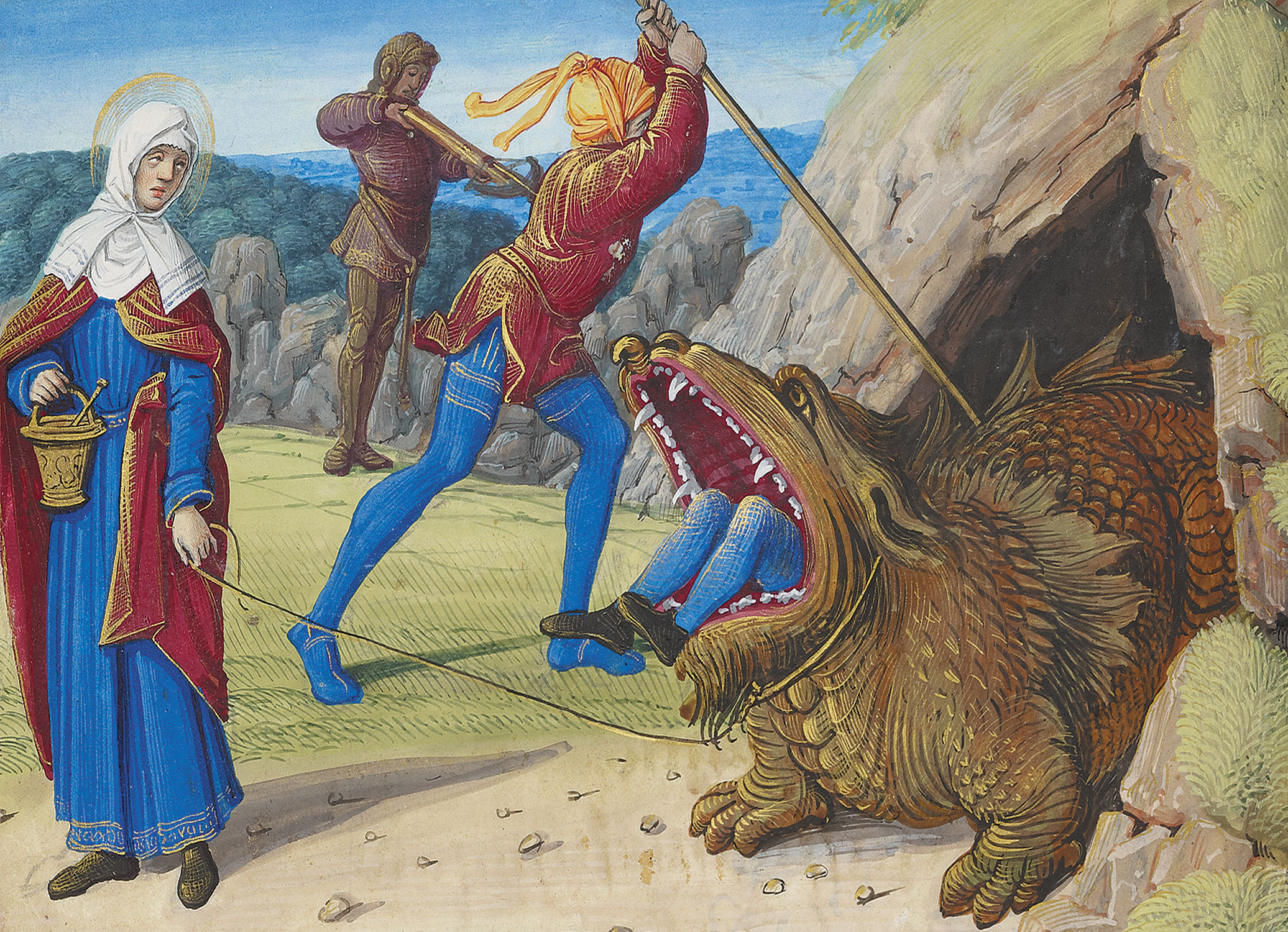
Martha with the Tarasque, from the Hours of Henry VIII

A further legend relates that Martha then went to Tarascon, France, where a monster, the Tarasque, was a constant threat to the population. The Golden Legend describes it as a beast from Galatia; a great dragon, half beast and half fish, greater than an ox, longer than a horse, having teeth sharp as a sword, and horned on either side, head like a lion, tail like a serpent, that dwelt in a certain wood between Arles and Avignon. Holding a cross in her hand, Martha sprinkled the beast with holy water. Placing her sash around its neck, she led the tamed dragon through the village.

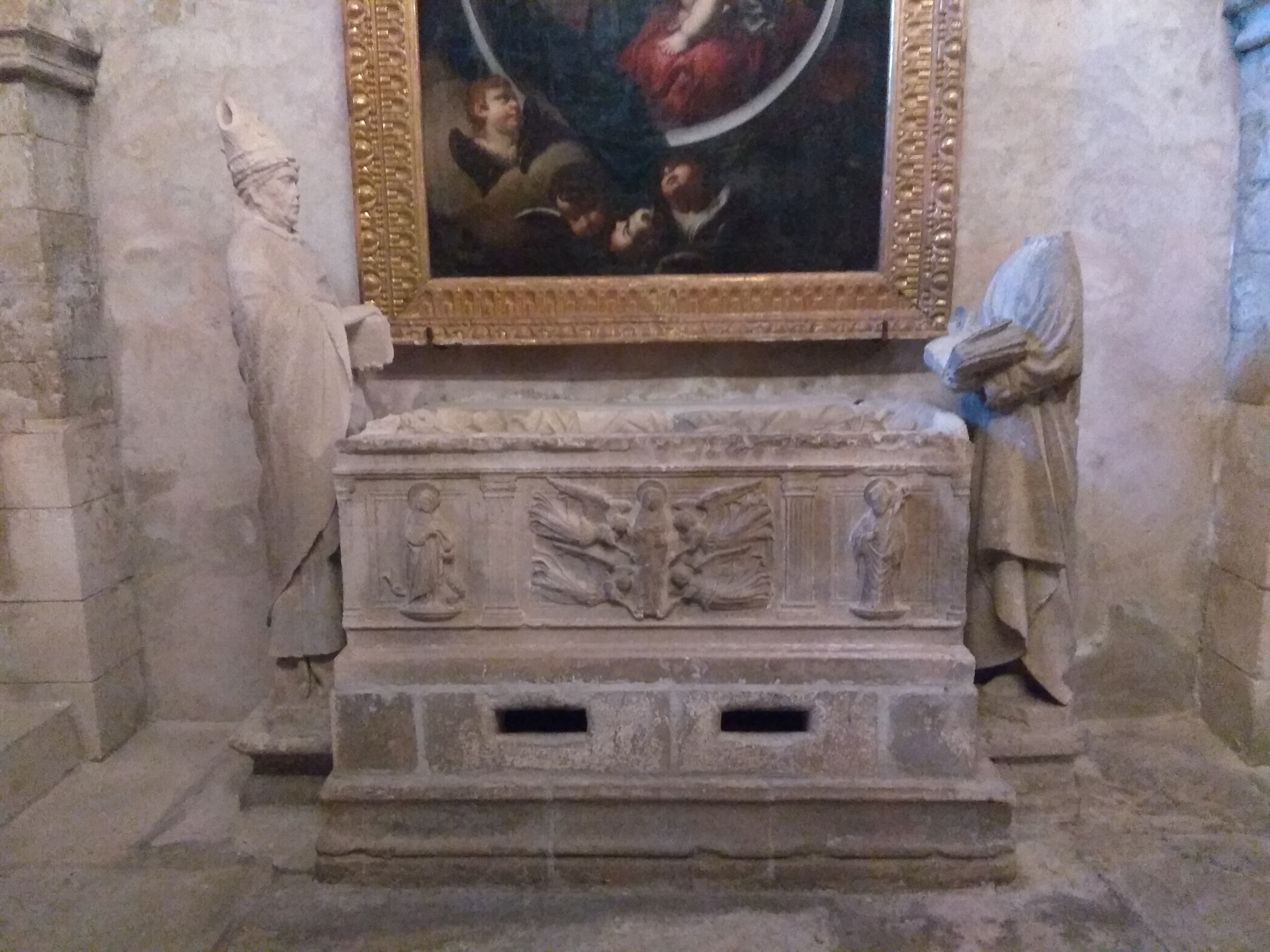
Gothic Tomb of Saint Martha in Tarascon

There Martha lived, daily occupied in prayers and in fastings. Martha eventually died in Tarascon, where she was buried. Her tomb is located in the crypt of the local Collegiate Church.

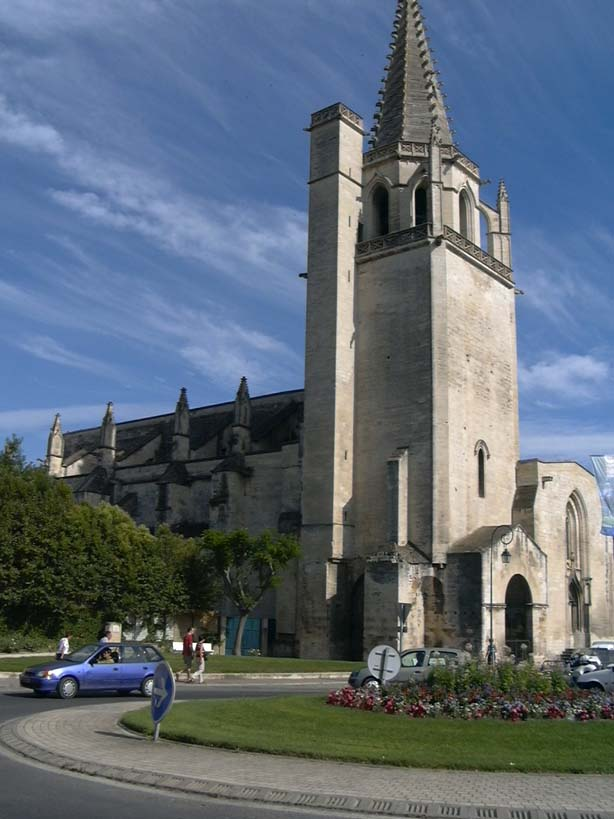
St Martha's Collegiate Church in Tarascon

The dedication of the Collegiate Church at Tarascon to St. Martha is believed to date from the 9th century or earlier. Relics found in the church during a reconstruction in 1187 were identified as hers, and reburied in a new shrine at that time. In the Collegiate Church crypt is a late 15th-century cenotaph, also known as the Gothic Tomb of Saint Martha. It is the work of Francesco Laurana, a Croatian sculptor of the Italian School, commissioned by King René. At its base are two openings through which the relics could be touched. It bears three low reliefs separated by fluted pilasters representing: on the left, Saint Martha and the Tarasque; in the center, Saint Mary Magdalene borne aloft by the angels; on the right, Lazarus as Bishop of Marseille with his mitre and staff. There are two figures on either side: on the left, Saint Front, Bishop of Perrigueux, present at the funeral of Saint Martha, and on the right, Saint Marcelle, Martha's servant.

=== St. Martha and Villajoyosa ===
The town of Villajoyosa, Spain, honors St. Martha as its patron saint and celebrates The Festival of Moors and Christians annually in her honor. The 250-year-old festival commemorates the attack on Villajoyosa by Berber pirates led by Zalé-Arraez in 1538, when, according to legend, St. Martha came to the rescue of the townsfolk by causing a flash flood which wiped out the enemy fleet, thus preventing the corsairs from reaching the coast.

=== St. Martha and Pateros ===
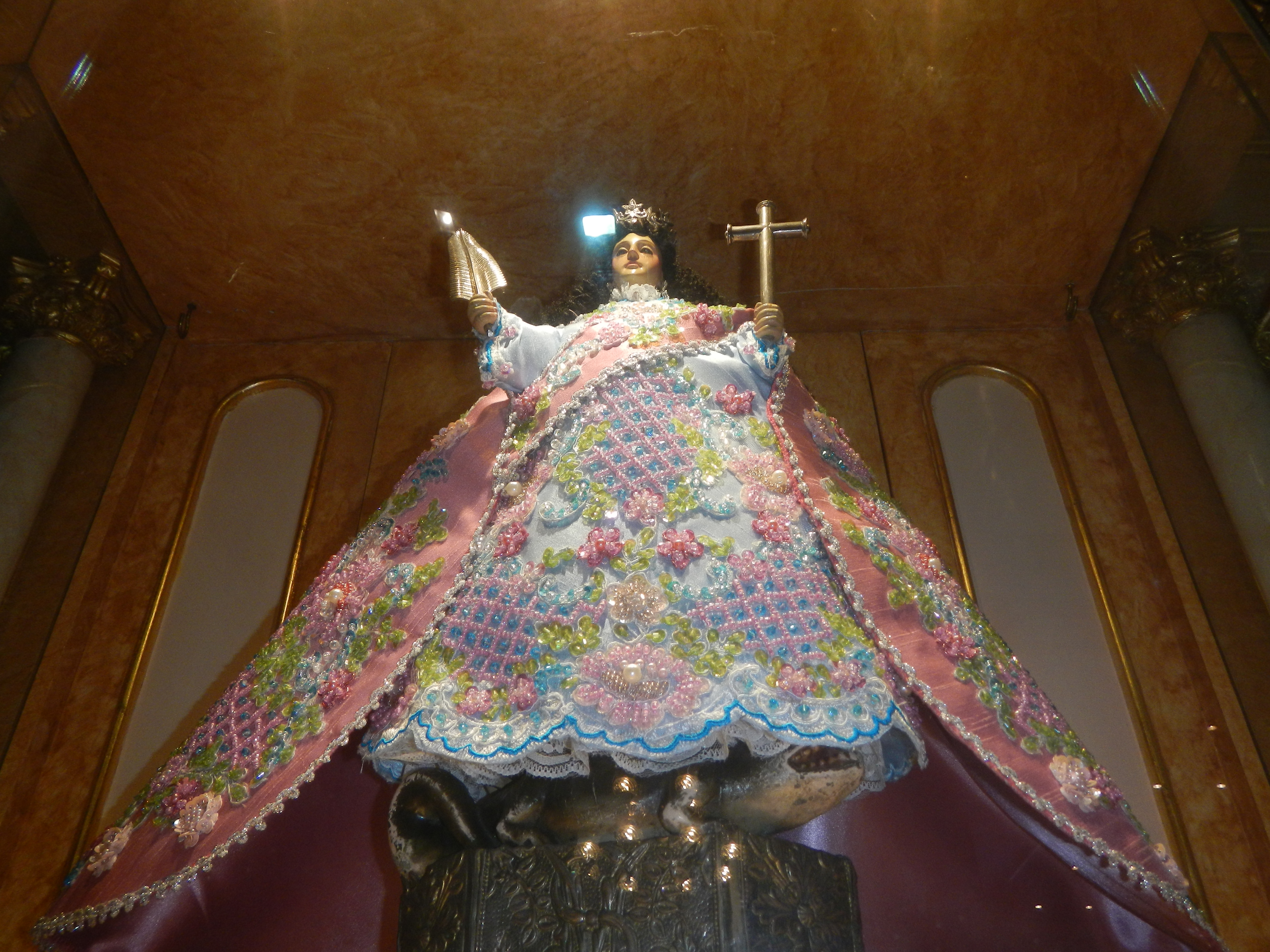
St. Martha, who is usually depicted taming the Tarasque, is, instead, depicted taming a giant crocodile that is believed to have plagued the duck farms of Pateros.

Tradition recounts that in the 1800s, Saint Martha (who legendarily subdued the Tarasque), was invoked by the people of Pateros, a town in Metro Manila, Philippines, to vanquish a crocodile in the Pateros River that ate their ducks. These animals were the main source of the townspeople's livelihood as their eggs are the main ingredient of the delicacy, Balút (fertilised duck egg), which is what the town is known for.

One evening, under a full moon, an unnamed female bayani (hero) went to the river to tame the creature. At the river banks, the crocodile saw a light surrounding the figure, who was actually Saint Martha. At the sight of the glowing figure, the creature disappeared and the local duck industry once again flourished. The people of Pateros attributed this event to Saint Martha and a grand fluvial procession in honor of her has been held yearly since, in remembrance of the event.

== Gnostic tradition ==
Martha appears in the sacred gnostic text Pistis Sophia. She is instructed by the risen Christ on several of the repentances that must be made in order to have salvation. She also makes several prophetic interpretations of different Psalms.

== Depictions in art and literature ==
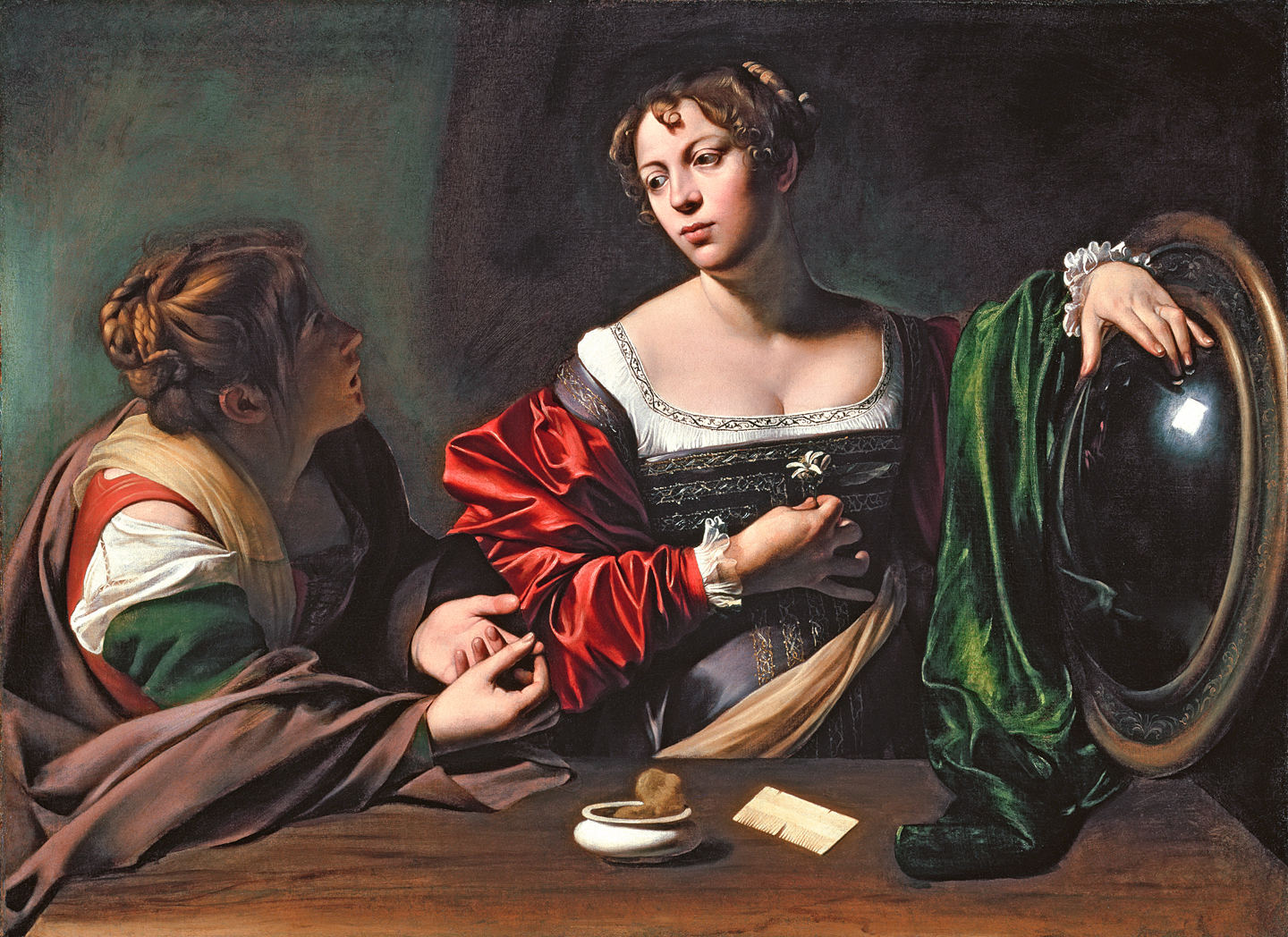
Caravaggio, Martha and Mary Magdalene, c. 1598. Martha (left) reproaches Mary Magdalen for her lifestyle.

The subject of Martha is mostly found in art from the Counter-Reformation onwards, especially in the 17th century, when the domestic setting is usually given a realistic depiction. Typically, Martha, the elder sister, is preparing or serving, while Mary is listening to Christ. However, it appears in some Ottonian cycles of the Life of Christ.

- Christ in the House of Martha and Mary (Velázquez), a 1618 oil-on-canvas painting by the Spanish painter Velázquez
- Christ in the House of Martha and Mary (Vermeer), a 1655 painting by Johannes Vermeer
- Martha and Mary Magdalene (Caravaggio), a 1598–99 painting by the Italian Baroque master Michelangelo Merisi da Caravaggio

Literary works about Martha include:

- Martha and Mary, a story in Karel Čapek's Apocryphal Tales (1932)
- "Saint Martha and the Dragon", a poem by Charles Causley in his collected works.
- The Sons of Martha (1907), a poem by Rudyard Kipling
- In The Handmaid's Tale, the dystopian novel of Margaret Atwood, infertile women forced to be servants for the ruling class are called "Marthas", as their service is considered imitating Martha.

== Gallery ==
Attributes

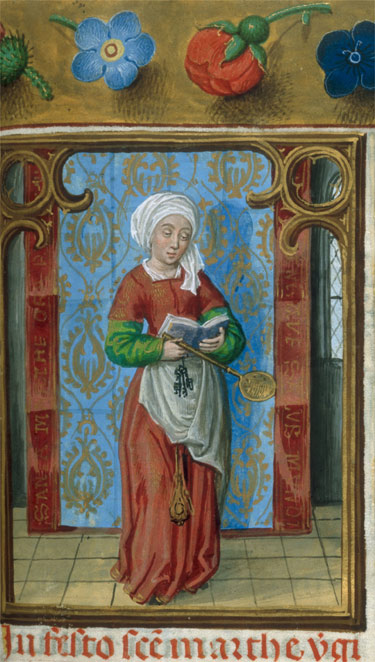
Saint Martha from the Isabella Breviary, 1497

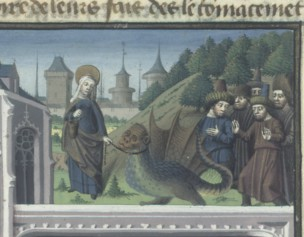
Saint Martha and the Tarasque, from a 15th-century manuscript

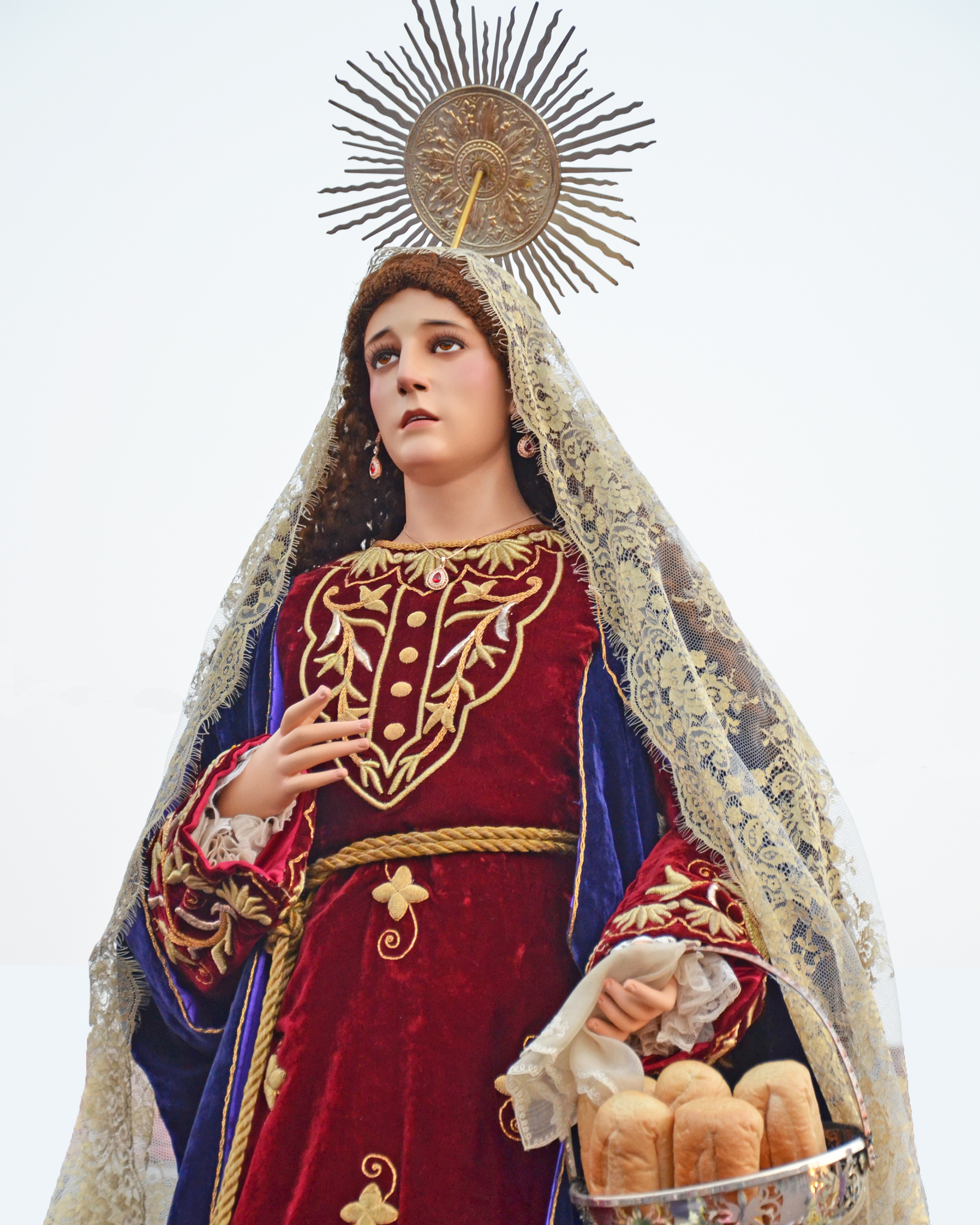
Statue of Saint Martha used in Holy Week Processions at the National Shrine and Parish of Saint Anne in Hagonoy, Bulacan, Philippines. She, together with her sister, Mary of Bethany, are among the characters typically seen in Lenten Processions in the Philippines, especially on Good Friday.

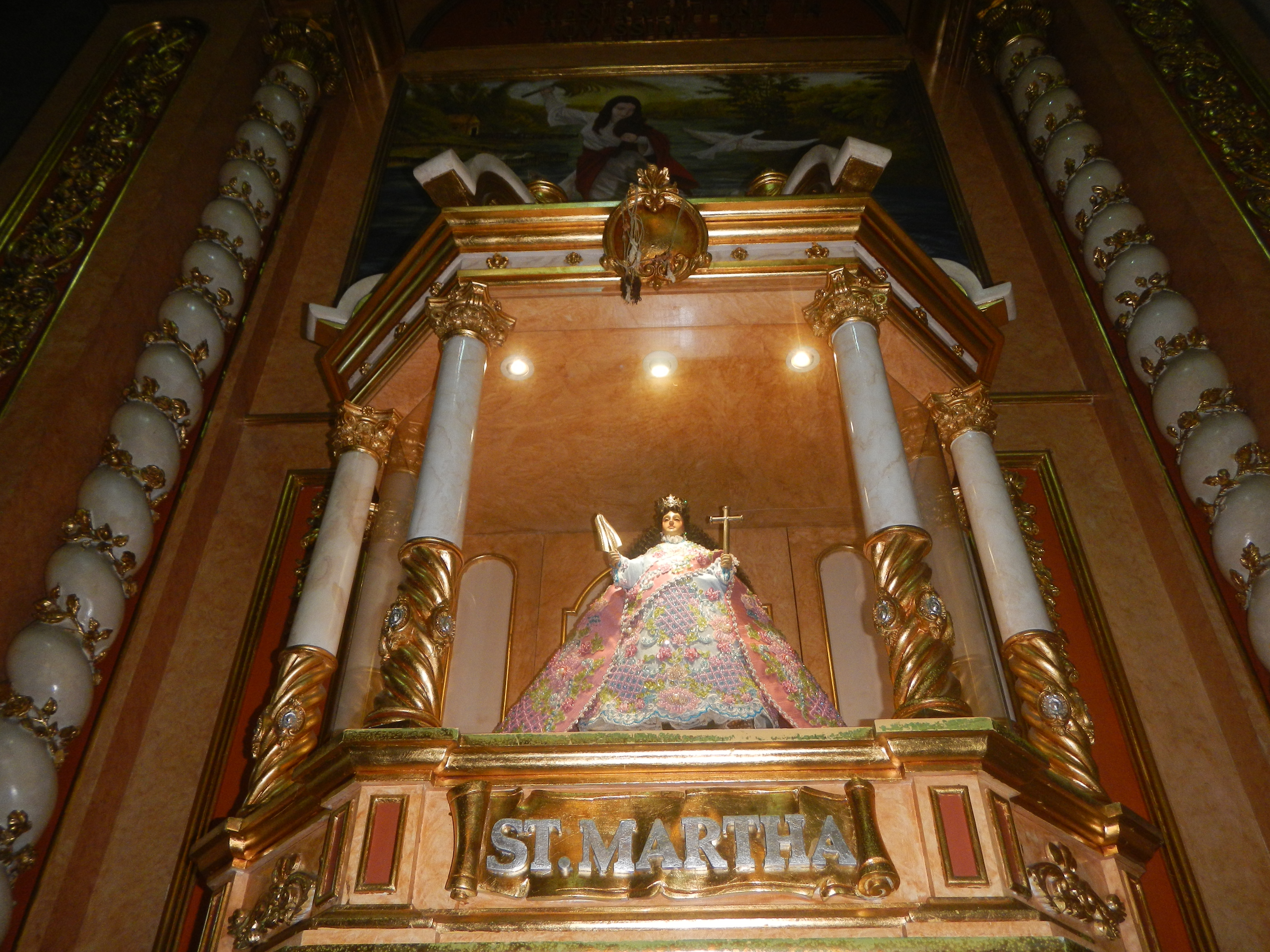
Saint Martha in her shrine in Pateros, Metro Manila, Philippines

== See also ==
- 205 Martha
- Jesus at the home of Martha and Mary
- Lazarus of Bethany
- Mary of Bethany
- Myrrhbearers
- Santa Marta de Pateros (Philippine Version)
