= Mary (name) =

Female given name

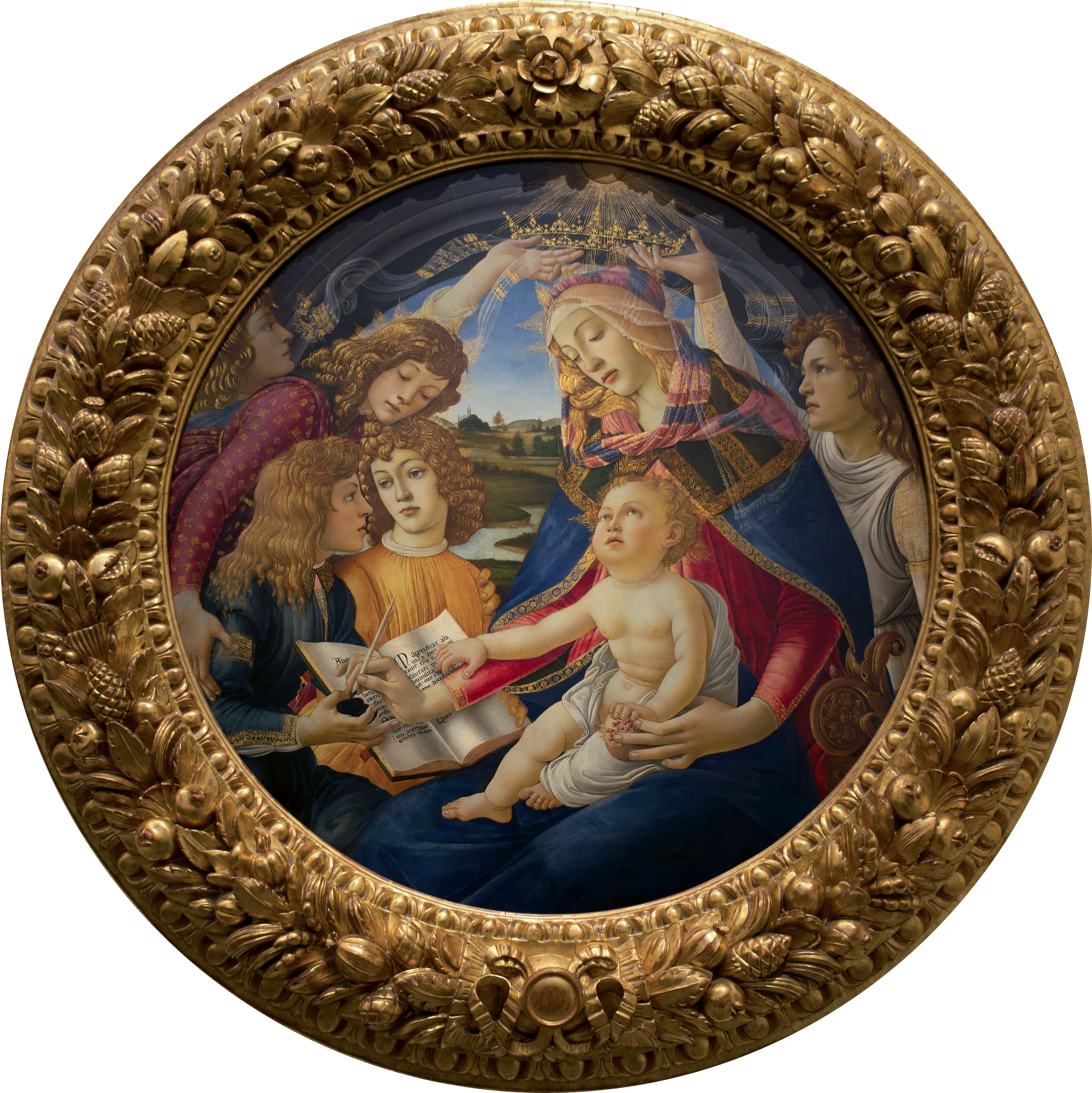
- The Glorification of Mary by Botticelli. The reverence for Mary, the mother of Jesus, is in large part responsible for the use of the name Mary and its variants.
- Pronunciation: /ˈmɛəˌri/, MAIR-ee
- Gender: Female
- Name day: September 12

Origin
- Origin: Aramaic and Hebrew via Latin and Greek
- Meaning: "beloved", "bitter", "drop of the sea", "marine", "rebelliousness", "wished-for child"

Other names
- Related names: Maria, Marie, Miriam, Molly, Mariah, Maryam

Mary (/ˈmɛəˌri/, MAIR-ee) is a feminine given name, the English form of the name Maria, which was in turn a Latin form of the Greek name Μαρία, María or Μαριάμ, Mariam, found in the Septuagint and New Testament. The latter reflects the original Hebrew pronunciation of the name מרים (Masoretic pronunciation Miryam), as attested by the Septuagint. The vowel "a" in a closed unaccented syllable later became "i", as seen in other names such as "Bil'am" (Balaam) and "Shimshon" (Samson).

== Etymology ==
The English name Mary arises by adoption of French Marie into Middle English. Wycliffe's Bible still has Marie, with the modern spelling current from the 16th century, found in the Tyndale Bible (1525), Coverdale Bible (1535) and later translations.

The name Mary may have originated from the Egyptian language; it is likely derivative of the root mr, meaning "love; beloved" (compare mry.t-ymn, "Merit-Amun", i.e. "beloved of Amun").

The name Mary was early etymologized as containing the Hebrew root mr, meaning "bitter" (cf. myrrh), or mry, meaning "rebellious". St. Jerome (writing c. 390), following Eusebius of Caesarea, translates the name as "drop of the sea" (stilla maris in Latin), from the Hebrew מר, mar, 'drop' (cf. Isaiah 40:15) and ים, yam, 'sea'. This translation was subsequently rendered stella maris ("star of the sea") due to scribal error, whence Our Lady's title Star of the Sea.

== Usage ==
Mary is among the top 100 names for baby girls born in Ireland, common among Christians and popular among Protestants specifically, owing to Queen Mary II. Mary did not come into common usage in Ireland until the 17th century, as the name was considered too holy to be used. Mary was the 179th most popular name for girls born in England and Wales in 2007.

In the United States, Mary was the most popular name given to baby girls from 1880 (when records were first available) until 1961. It was still the most common name for all women and girls in the United States in the 1990 census. Mary first fell below the top 100 most popular names given baby girls in 2009. In 2025, Mary was the 125th most popular name given to baby girls. However, according to the Social Security Administration, Mary is the seventh most common given name for living women in the United States, with 2.16 million individuals bearing this name as of 2023. The average age of women named "Mary" is 64 years.

The name Mary remains more popular in the Southern United States than elsewhere in the country. In 2007, Mary was the 15th most popular name for girls born in Alabama, the 22nd most popular name for girls born in Mississippi, the 44th most popular name for girls in North Carolina, the 33rd most popular name for girls in South Carolina, and the 26th most popular name for girls in Tennessee.

== Fictional characters ==
- Mary Flynn, various characters
- Mary Tate, various characters
- Mary Worth, various characters
- Princess Mary, in Russian writer Mikhail Lermontov's 1840 novel A Hero of Our Time
- Mary, in the 1917 British silent drama film Mary Girl, played by Jessie Winter
- Mary, in the 1923 American silent semi-autobiographical comedy film Mary of the Movies, played by Marion Mack
- Mary, in the 1969 British animated children's television series Mary, Mungo and Midge, voiced by Isabel Ryan
- Mary, in the 1974 American made-for-television drama film Can Ellen Be Saved
- Mary (Ma Li), in the 1992 Hong Kong film Mary from Beijing, played by Gong Li
- Mary, in the 2005 American musical children's television series Jack's Big Music Show, played by Alice Dinnean
- Mary, in the 2006 British science fiction television program Torchwood, played by Daniela Denby-Ashe
- Mary, in the 2017 Canadian drama film Mary Goes Round, played by Aya Cash
- Mary Aiken, in the 1977 US comedy film Andy Warhol's Bad, played by Susan Tyrrell
- Mary Albright, in the 1996 American sitcom 3rd Rock from the Sun, played by Jane Curtin
- Mary Alfyorov, in the 1926 Russian novel Mary
- Mary Andrews, Archie Andrews's mother in Archie Comics and Riverdale
- Mary Bailey, in the 1989 American animated sitcom The Simpsons, voiced by Maggie Roswell and Tress MacNeille
- Mary Bailey, in the 2006 American post-apocalyptic action drama television series Jericho, played by Clare Carey
- Mary Elizabeth Bartowski, in the 2007 American action comedy spy drama television series Chuck, played by Linda Hamilton
- Mary Bell, in the 1992 Japanese magical girl anime series Flower Witch Mary Bell, voiced by Chieko Honda
- Mary Bennet, in Jane Austen's Pride and Prejudice (1813)
- Mary Bishop, in the 1963 American television soap opera General Hospital, played by Catherine Wadkins
- Mary Bradburn, in the 1996 British crime drama television series Silent Witness, played by Diana Hardcastle
- Mary Burns, in the 1935 American drama film Mary Burns, Fugitive, played by Sylvia Sidney
- Mary Camden, in the 1996 American family drama television series 7th Heaven, played by Jessica Biel
- Mary Cherry, in the 1999 American teen comedy-drama television series Popular, played by Leslie Grossman
- Mary Connor, in the 1931 British thriller film 77 Park Lane, played by Betty Stockfeld
- Mary Cooper, Sheldon Cooper's mother in Young Sheldon
- Mary Corleone, in the 1990 American epic crime film The Godfather Part III, played by Sofia Coppola
- Mary Crane, in the 1921 short story The Voyage
- Mary Crane, in the 1959 American horror novel Psycho
- Mary Crawford, in the 1814 novel Mansfield Park
- Mary Darling, in J. M. Barrie's Peter Pan
- Mary DeAngelis, in the 1999 American crime drama television series The Sopranos, played by Suzanne Shepherd
- Mary Daisy Dinkle, in the 2009 Australian adult stop-motion animated comedy-drama film Mary and Max, played by Toni Collette (as an adult) and Bethany Whitmore (in her youth)
- Mary Drake (Pretty Little Liars), in the 2010 American mystery teen drama television series Pretty Little Liars, played by Andrea Parker
- Mary Driscoll, in the 1922 Irish novel Ulysses
- Mary Flaherty, in the 2003 American sex comedy film American Wedding, played by Deborah Rush
- Mary Flaherty, in the 1985 British television soap opera EastEnders, played by Melanie Clark Pullen
- Mary Goodnight, in the 1974 American spy film The Man with the Golden Gun, played by Britt Ekland
- Mary Goskirk, in the 1972 British television soap opera Emmerdale, played by Louise Jameson
- Mary Gray, in the 1926 American silent comedy film The American Venus, played by Esther Ralston
- Mary Grayson, in DC Comics
- Mary Grey, in the 1939 American comedy film 5th Ave Girl, played by Ginger Rogers
- Mary Hamilton, in the 2019 American superhero television series Batwoman, played by Nicole Kang
- Mary Harkinson, in the 1985 British television soap opera EastEnders, played by Mary Woodvine
- Mary Hartman, in the 1976 American satirical soap opera Mary Hartman, Mary Hartman, played by Louise Lasser
- Mary Hatch Bailey, in the 1946 American Christmas supernatural drama film It's a Wonderful Life, played by Donna Reed (as an adult) and Jeanne Gale (as a child)
- Mary Hilton, in the 1956 British crime drama film Yield to the Night, played by Diana Dors
- Mary Howard, in the 1941 American romantic comedy film When Ladies Meet, played by Joan Crawford
- Mary Hurley Jenkins, in the 1985 American sitcom 227, played by Marla Gibbs
- Mary Jackson, in the 1960 British television soap opera Coronation Street, played by Barbara Ashcroft
- Mary Jackson, in Stephen King's novels The Regulators (1996) and Desperation (1996)
- Mary Jamison, in the 2014 American supernatural drama television series The Leftovers, played by Janel Moloney
- Mary Kline, a character from Backrooms (film) Played by Renate Reinsve
- Mary Lamb, in the 2023 American Christmas comedy-drama film The Holdovers, played by Da'Vine Joy Randolph
- Mary Lennox, in the 1911 children's novel The Secret Garden
- Dr. Mary Lightly, in the 2006 American comedy-drama television series Psych, played by Jimmi Simpson
- Mary Loomis, in the 1983 American psychological slasher film Psycho II, played by Meg Tilly
- Mary MacPherran, in Marvel Comics
- Dr. Mary Malone, in Sir Philip Pullman's fantasy novel trilogies His Dark Materials (1995) and The Book of Dust (2017)
- Mary Maloney, in the 1954 short story Lamb to the Slaughter
- Mary Marvel, in DC Comics
- Mary Mathew, in the 1990 Indian Hindi-language action crime film Agneepath, played by Maadhavi
- Mary May, in the 1994 American comedy-drama film Andre, played by Andrea Libman
- Mary McGee, in the 1948 American drama film Speed to Spare, played by Jean Rogers
- Mary Melody, in the 1990 American animated television series Tiny Toon Adventures, voiced by Cindy McGee (in 1990) and Cree Summer (from 1990 to 1994)
- Mary Moreland, in the 1917 American silent drama film Mary Moreland, played by Marjorie Rambeau
- Mary Morstan, in Sir Arthur Conan Doyle's adaptations of Sherlock Holmes
- Mary Mouse, envisioned by British children's author Enid Blyton
- Mary Noble, in the 1935 American soap opera radio program Backstage Wife, played by Vivian Fridell (from 1935 to the early 1940s) and Claire Niesen (from 1945 to 1959)
- Mary O'Connor, in the 1920 American drama film The Prince of Avenue A, played by Cora Drew
- Mary O'Connor, in the 1996 British soap opera London Bridge, played by Simone Lahbib
- Mary Anastasia O'Connor, Maisie Ravier's alter ego in the Maisie film series
- Mary Parker, the mother of Spider-Man
- Mary Plain, an anthropomorphic bear in Welsh author Gwynedd Rae's children's novels
- Mary Poppins, in P. L. Travers's eponymous book series
- Mary Reid, in the 1982 British television soap opera Brookside, played by Carolyn Jordan
- Mary Richards, in the 1970 American television sitcom The Mary Tyler Moore Show, played by Mary Tyler Moore
- Mary Rose, in J.M. Barrie's play Mary Rose (1920)
- Mary Russell, in the Mary Russell & Sherlock Holmes mystery series
- Mary Ryan, in the 1949 American crime drama film Mary Ryan, Detective, played by Marsha Hunt
- Mary Sanderson, in the 1993 American fantasy comedy film Hocus Pocus, played by Kathy Najimy
- Mary Saotome, in the 2014 Japanese manga series Kakegurui, voiced by Minami Tanaka
- Mary Sawyer, in Mark Twain's The Adventures of Tom Sawyer
- Mary Shannon, in the 2008 American drama TV series In Plain Sight, played by Mary McCormack
- Mary Shaw, in the 2022 Canadian animated web series Mary and Flo On the Go!, voiced by Rebecca Liddiard
- Mary Shepherd-Sunderland, in the Japanese horror anthology media franchise Silent Hill, voiced by Monica Taylor Horgan
- Mary Shieler, in the 2009 American documentary film Talhotblond
- Mary Simpson, in the 1964 Italian comedy film Two Mafiamen in the Far West, played by Ana Casares
- Mary Simpson, in Eric Flint's 1632 book series (2000)
- Mary Smith, in the 1921 British silent drama film Mary-Find-the-Gold, played by Betty Balfour
- Mary Smith, in the 2017 Japanese animated fantasy film Mary and the Witch's Flower, voiced by Hana Sugisaki
- Mary Smythe, in the 1970 American television soap opera All My Children, played by Anna Stuart
- Mary Spuckler, in the 1989 American animated sitcom The Simpsons, voiced by Zooey Deschanel
- Mary Stillworth, in the American writer George Henry Miles's 1854 drama Mary's Birthday; or the Cynic
- Mary Stubbs, in the 1960 British television soap opera Coronation Street, played by Joy Stewart
- Lady Mary Talbot, in the 2010 British historical drama television series Downton Abbey, played by Michelle Dockery
- Mary Taylor, in the 1960 British television soap opera Coronation Street, played by Patti Clare
- Mary Taylor, in the 1982 American science fiction film E.T., played by Dee Wallace
- Mary Thomas, in the 1993 American television sitcom Frasier, played by Kim Coles
- Mary Walker, the alter ego of Typhoid Mary (character)
- Mary Walker, in the 2017 American television series Iron Fist, played by Alice Eve
- Mary Whitehead, in the 1969 American comedy film Angel in My Pocket, played by Lee Meriwether
- Mary Williams, in the 1973 American television soap opera The Young and the Restless, played by Carolyn Conwell
- Mary Williams, in the 1977 French film Another Man, Another Chance, played by Jennifer Warren
- Mary Winchester, in the 2005 American television drama series Supernatural, played by Samantha Smith
- Mary Fraga, in the 2017 Argentine film Los que aman, odian, played by Luisana Lopilato
- Mary Wright, in the 2008 American fantasy horror drama television series True Blood, played by Valarie Pettiford

== See also ==
- Máire
- Maree
- Mari
- Marian
- Marianne
- Marilyn
- Marion
- Marnie
- Mary Abigail
- Mary Agnes
- Mary Alice
- Mary Ann
- Mary Anna
- Mary Augusta
- Mary Beth
- Mary Boyle
- Mary Catherine
- Mary Claire
- Mary Clare
- Mary Edith
- Mary Eleanor
- Mary Elizabeth
- Mary Ella
- Mary Ellen
- Mary Emma
- Mary Esther
- Mary Ethel
- Mary Eugenia
- Mary Evelyn
- Mary Frances
- Mary Gertrude
- Mary Grace
- Mary Hannah
- Mary Hayes
- Mary Helen
- Mary Isabel
- Mary Isabella
- Mary Jane
- Mary Jean
- Mary Jeanne
- Mary Jo
- Mary Josephine
- Mary Joy
- Mary Julia
- Mary Kate
- Mary Letitia
- Mary Lou
- Mary Louisa
- Mary Louise
- Mary Lynn
- Mary Margaret
- Mary Martha
- Mary Noel
- Mary of Jesus
- Mary Olivia
- Mary Sophia
- Mary Sue
- Mery
- Miriai
- Muffy
- Muire
- Polly
- Saint Mary

== Footnotes ==
=== References ===
- Rosenkrantz, Linda; Satran, Pamela Redmond (2005). Beyond Jennifer and Jason, Madison and Montana (4th ed.). St. Martin's Paperbacks. ISBN 0-312-94095-5.
- Todd, Loreto (1998). Celtic Names for Children. Irish American Book Company. ISBN 0-9627855-6-3.
- Wallace, Carol (2004). The Penguin Classic Baby Name Book. Penguin. ISBN 0-14-200470-7.
- Wood, Jamie Martinez (2001). ¿Cómo te llamas, Baby?. Berkley. ISBN 0-425-17959-1.
