= Mary Lynn =

Marylyn, Mary Lyn, Mary Lynn, or Mary Lynne may refer to:

== Marylyn ==
- Marylyn Addo, German infectiologist and professor
- Marylyn Chiang (born 1977), Canadian former swimmer
- Marylyn D. Ritchie, American professor of genetics
- Marylyn Dintenfass (born 1943), American painter, printmaker, and sculptor

== Mary Lyn ==
- Mary Lyn Ray (born 1946), American author of children's literature, conservationist, and historic preservationist
- Mary Lyn Wilde (1922–2016), one of The Wilde Twins, American film actress

== Mary Lynn ==
- Mary-Lynn Breeden (?–1991), Canadian murder victim
- Mary Lynn Lightfoot (born 1952), American choral composer and music publishing editor
- MaryLynn Magar (born 1963), American politician
- Mary-Lynn Neil (born 1997), Canadian singer, songwriter, and model
- Mary Lynn Rajskub, American actress and comedian
- Mary Lynn Realff (born 1965), American mechanical engineer and materials scientist
- Mary Lynn Reed (born 1967), American mathematician, intelligence researcher, professor, and short fiction writer
- Mary Lynn Ritzenthaler, American archivist
- Mary Lynn Twombly (born 1935), American composer, conductor, and pianist
- Mary Lynn Witherspoon (1950–2003), American school teacher and murder victim

== Mary Lynne ==
- Mary Lynne Gasaway Hill (born 1964), American poet, writer, and professor

== See also ==
- Mary Lyon (disambiguation)
- Mary Flynn (disambiguation)
