= Muffy =

Muffy or Muffie is an American nickname and may refer to:

== People ==
- Muffie Cabot (born c. 1936), American heiress and socialite
- Muffy Calder (born 1958), Scottish computer scientist
- Marianna Davis (born 1972), American Paralympic cyclist, sit-skier and mountain climber
- Marjorie Fleming (1803–1811), Scottish child writer and poet
- Alie Israel (born 1983), American sprinter
- Esme Mackinnon (1913–1999), British world champion alpine skier
- Muffie Meyer, American film director
- Mayer Amschel de Rothschild (1818–1874), English businessman and politician, member of the Rothschild family
- Muffy McGraw (born 1955) Notre Dame University women's basketball coach

== Fictional characters ==
- Muffy, a character and a bachelorette in Harvest Moon: A Wonderful Life and Harvest Moon DS
- Nickname of the title character of Maureen Birnbaum, Barbarian Swordsperson, a 1993 anthology, and other short stories
- Muffy Alice Crosswire, in the children's book and animated children's television series Arthur
- Muffy, a recurring character in the sitcom That's So Raven
- Muffy B. Tepperman, in the 1982–1983 sitcom Square Pegs
- Muffy Mouse, in the 1980s Canadian children's television series Today's Special
- Muffy, in the 1986 horror film April Fool's Day
- Muffy St. Jacques, in the R rated John Waters black comedy film "Desperate Living"
- Muffy Keyes, a.k.a. Lady Baglady, in Chuck Palahniuk's 2005 novel Haunted

== See also ==
- Miffy, character in a series of picture books by Dutch artist Dick Bruna
