= Mary Rhodes (disambiguation) =

Mary Rhodes may refer to:

- Mary Ann Rhodes (1882–1998), Canadian supercentenarian
- Mary Evelyn Rhodes (1925–2018), British author and historian
- Mary Louise Rhodes (1916–1987), American petroleum geologist
- Mary Rhodes (born 1969), British news presenter
- Mary Rhodes Moorhouse-Pekkala (1889–1975), British-born Finnish patronage and civil rights activist
- Mary Rhodes Russell (born 1958), American judge of the Supreme Court of Missouri
