= Mary Barrett =

Mary Barrett may refer to:

- Mary Dyer née Barrett (c. 1611–1660), colonial American Quaker martyr
- Mary Ellin Barrett (1926–2022), American writer
- Mary Adrian Barrett (1929–2015), American Catholic religious sister
- Mary Hall Barrett Adams (1816–1860), née Barrett, American book editor and letter writer
- Mary Ethel Williams Barrett (1913–1951), artist, art teacher, and the first director of the Wilmington Museum of Art

== See also ==
- Maria Barrett, American general
- Mario Barrett a.k.a. Mario (born 1986), American singer
- Maurie Barrett (1893–1981), Australian rules footballer
