= Mary Josephine =

Mary Josephine is a given name. Notable people with the name include:

- Mary Josephine Bedford (1861–1955), English-born Australian philanthropist
- Mary Josephine Benson (1887–1965), Canadian poet and journalist
- Mary Josephine Booth (1876–1965), American librarian
- Mary Josephine Donovan O'Sullivan (1887–1966), Irish professor of history
- Mary Josephine Hannan (c. 1865–c. 1935), Irish medical doctor
- Mary Josephine Pritam Singh (born 1949), Malaysian politician
- Mary Josephine Shelly (1902–1976), American educational and military administrator
- Mary Josephine Walters (1837–1883), American landscape painter
