= Mary Elizabeth =

Mary Elizabeth has been the given name of many famous women. This name was used in reference to the Visitation of Saint Mary to Saint Elizabeth.

== People ==
- Mary Elizabeth Barber (1818–1899), British natural historian
- Mary Elizabeth Bayer (1925–2005), Canadian civil servant, educator, and community activist
- Mary Elizabeth Biden (1894–1943), grandmother of Joe Biden
- Mary Elizabeth Bliss (1824–1909), daughter of Zachary Taylor
- Mary Elizabeth Braddon (1835–1915), British novelist
- Mary Elizabeth Coleridge (1861–1907), British novelist and poet
- Mary Elizabeth Counselman (1911–1995), American short story writer and poet
- Mary Elizabeth Donaldson (born 1972), Queen of Denmark
- Mary Elizabeth Ellis (born 1979), American actress and screenwriter
- Mary Elizabeth Flores (born 1973), Honduran journalist, lawyer, politician, and diplomat
- Mary Elizabeth "Tipper" Gore (born 1948), former Second Lady of the United States
- Mary Elizabeth Greear, birth name of Joan Barclay (1914–2002), American film actress
- Mary Elizabeth Lease (1850–1933), American activist
- Mary Elizabeth Maude Chomley (1871–1960), Australian charity worker, arts patron, and feminist
- Mary Elizabeth Nelson, a wife of Brigham Young
- Mary Elizabeth Parker Bouligny (1839–1908), American socialite and author
- Mary Elizabeth Parmenter, English mother of criminal Dick Turpin
- Mary Elizabeth Riggs, birth name of Evelyn Brent (1895–1975), American film- and stage actress
- Mary Elizabeth Rollins, another wife of Brigham Young
- Mary Elizabeth Mastrantonio (born 1958), American actress
- Mary Elizabeth McDonough (born 1961), American actress
- Mary Elizabeth McGlynn (born 1966), American voice actress
- Mary Elizabeth Richardson, birth name of Mollie Tripe (1870–1939), New Zealand artist and art teacher
- Mary Elizabeth "Liz" Truss (born 1975), former Prime Minister of the United Kingdom
- Mary Elizabeth "Liz" Twist (born 1956), British politician
- Mary Elizabeth Williams, American columnist
- Mary Elizabeth Wilson (1889–1962), English murderer
- Mary Elizabeth Winstead (born 1984), American actress

== Fictional characters ==
- Mary Elizabeth Bartowski, in the US action comedy spy drama TV series Chuck, played by Linda Hamilton

== See also ==
- Mary (given name)
- Elizabeth (given name)
