= Mary Nutting =

Mary Nutting may refer to:

- Mary Adelaide Nutting (1858–1948), Canadian nurse, educator, and pioneer in the field of hospital care
- Mary Olivia Nutting (1831–1910), American author, and the first librarian at Mount Holyoke College
