= Mary Sue (disambiguation) =

A Mary Sue is a character archetype in fiction.

Mary Sue may also refer to:

- The Mary Sue, a website highlighting women in "geek culture"
- Mary Sue (given name)
