= Mary Benson =

Mary Benson may refer to:

- Mary Benson (campaigner) (1919–2000), South African civil rights campaigner and author
- Mary Benson (hostess) (1841–1918), English hostess
- Mary Knight Benson (1877–1930), Native American basket maker
- Mary Josephine Benson (1887–1965), Canadian poet and journalist
- Mary Foley Benson (1905–1992), American scientific illustrator and fine artist
