= Mary McPhillips =

Mary McPhillips may refer to:

- Mary Helen McPhillips (1931–1998), Canadian television personality
- Mary M. McPhillips, member of the New York State Assembly
