= Mary Walters =

Mary Walters may refer to:

- Mary Coon Walters (1922–2001), American judge
- Mary Josephine Walters (1837–1883), American painter
