= Mary and Martha =

Mary and Martha may refer to:

- Jesus at the home of Martha and Mary, a story in Luke 10
- Mary and Martha, sisters of Lazarus of Bethany, in John 11
  - Mary of Bethany
  - Martha
- Mary and Martha (film), a 2013 British television movie starring Hilary Swank and Brenda Blethyn
- Mary and Martha Society, a Christianity-based service organization

== See also ==
- Martha and Mary Magdalene (Caravaggio)
- Mary Martha (disambiguation)
- Christ in the House of Martha and Mary (disambiguation)
- Marfo-Mariinsky Convent
