= Jay Telotte =

American author and professor of film studies

Jay P. Telotte, published as J. P. Telotte, is a professor in the School of Literature, Media, and Communication at the Georgia Institute of Technology. With over 150 published scholarly articles and 10 published books, his area of expertise lies in film studies. His primary field of study is film history and genres, and he is particularly involved in the studies of science fiction. In his book Animating the Science Fiction Imagination, Telotte combines his interest in the science fiction genre and animation to explore the intersection between the two.

== Education ==
In 1971, Telotte received his bachelor's in English and education from Loyola University. Two years later, in 1973, he received his master's in English from the University of New Orleans and later, in 1976, his PhD in the same field from the University of Florida.

== Career ==
Telotte joined the faculty at the Georgia Institute of Technology in 1979 as an assistant professor, and was later promoted as a full professor in the School of Literature, Media, and Communication in 1991. For three years, he served as the interim chair of Georgia Tech's School of Literature, Media, and Communication.

In his own works and research pursuits, Telotte dedicates himself to exploring the history and various genres of film. He is particularly interested in exploring animation and the genre of science fiction. Amongst the 10 books he currently has published, a significant number of them are dedicated to these subjects. In his book Animating Space: From Mickey to Wall-E, Telotte discusses the ways in which animation artists have utilized “the blank template” and their physically limited artistic spaces, as well as the physical and philosophical notion of space according to culture. He also discusses the notion of space in the strictly science fiction definition through his book Animating the Science Fiction Imagination. In this work, Telotte details the historical development of the science fiction genre in the mid-1900s and how animation played a role in society's changing perception of it.

In addition to his own published books, Telotte has written and published over 150 scholarly articles. He has also acted as the editor for four published books and is currently the co-editor of the film journal Post Script. Telotte is on the editorial board for a number of other film and genre-related journals, such as Literature/Film Quarterly.

== Select works ==
- Telotte, Jay. Animating the Science Fiction Imagination. Oxford University Press, 2017.
- Telotte, Jay. Robot Ecology and the Science Fiction Film. Routledge, 2016.
- Telotte, Jay. Science Fiction Television. Routledge, 2014.
- Telotte, Jay. Science Fiction Film, Television, and Adaptation. Routledge, 2013.
- Telotte, Jay. Animating Space: From Mickey to WALL-E. University Press of Kentucky, 2010.
