= Muffy (given name) =

Feminine given name, hypocorism

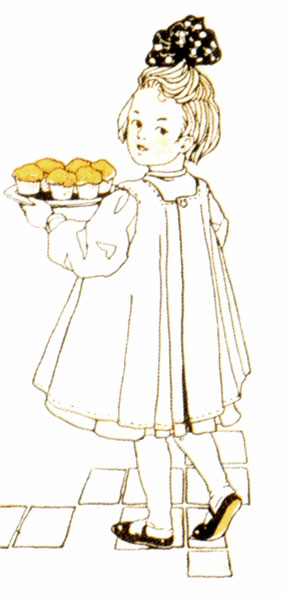
- Muffins, an illustration from the 1905 Pillsbury Company cookbook A Little Book for a Little Cook.
- Gender: Feminine
- Language: English

Origin
- Meaning: Nickname for names starting with M

Other names
- Related names: Moff, Moffet, Muffet, Muffin

Muffy or Muffie is a primarily feminine given name and hypocorism. It originated as a feminine nickname for names beginning with the letter M such as Mary, Margaret, or Martha and came to be regarded in the 1980s as a stereotypical preppy nickname. The name is sometimes associated with or derived from the word Muffin, an English term for an individual baked bun that is sometimes used as a term of endearment. In other instances, it might be derived from the English nursery rhyme Little Miss Muffet.

== People ==
- Muffie Cabot (born c. 1936), American heiress and socialite
- Muffy Calder (born 1958), Scottish computer scientist
- Marianna Davis (born 1972), American Paralympic cyclist, sit-skier and mountain climber
- Marjorie Fleming (1803–1811), Scottish child writer and poet
- Alie Israel (born 1983), American sprinter
- Esme Mackinnon (1913–1999), British world champion alpine skier
- Muffie Meyer, American film director
- Mayer Amschel de Rothschild (1818–1874), English businessman and politician, member of the Rothschild family
- Muffet McGraw (born 1955) American Notre Dame University women's basketball coach
- Muffy Styler (born 1973), stage name of American jazz singer, musician and performer Jenny Lee Mitchell

== Fictional characters ==
- Muffy, a character and a bachelorette in Harvest Moon: A Wonderful Life and Harvest Moon DS
- Nickname of the title character of Maureen Birnbaum, Barbarian Swordsperson, a 1993 anthology, and other short stories
- Mary Alice "Muffy" Crosswire, in the children's book and animated children's television series Arthur
- Muffy, a recurring character in the sitcom That's So Raven
- Muffy B. Tepperman, in the 1982–1983 sitcom Square Pegs
- Muffy Mouse, in the 1980s Canadian children's television series Today's Special
- Muffy, in the 1986 horror film April Fool's Day
- Muffy St. Jacques, in the R rated John Waters black comedy film "Desperate Living"
- Muffy Keyes, a.k.a. Lady Baglady, in Chuck Palahniuk's 2005 novel Haunted
