= School of Literature, Media, and Communication =

The School of Literature, Media, and Communication (LMC) is one of six units of the Ivan Allen College of Liberal Arts at the Georgia Institute of Technology. The School focuses primarily on interdisciplinary approaches to the humanities, social sciences, and science/technology to provide "Humanistic Perspectives in a Technological World."

== History ==
When the Georgia School of Technology opened in 1888, English was among the six foundational subjects. In 1913, English professors began teaching Economics and Business English for the newly created College of Commerce, and in 1924, the department added courses in Public Speaking and Drama. In the 1930s Radio Speaking and Technical English, in the 1970s, Film and Cinema studies were included in the curriculum. In 1990, the Department of English was renamed the School of Literature, Communication, and Culture (LCC) in the newly created Ivan Allen College of Liberal Arts. In 2012, based on its increasing strengths in media studies, LCC decided to name itself School of Literature, Media, and Communication (LMC).

== Identity ==
Because the School unites faculty with degree backgrounds in Biomedicine, Communication, Composition, Creative Writing, Cultural Studies, Digital Media, Digital Humanities, Film, Literature, Law, Performance Studies, Video Production, etc., its identity is interdisciplinary and "joyfully 'undisciplined,' 'incomparable,' and 'peerless,' and nobody could possibly identify a fitting category within the famed Delaware Study of Instructional Costs & Productivity to measure and rank [the School] against other teaching units in the nation." Even the final remnants of the unit's origins as an English department are superficial as the School's "eighteenth-century British Literature specialist focuses on surveillance, [the] early Americanist […] work[s] on Metadata Visualization, [the] Shakespearean centers on Renaissance science, and [the] Victorianist examines representations of medicine in nineteenth-century culture."

== Department/School Leaders ==
- 1946: W.G. Perry
- 1970: David B. Comer
- 1977: Karl Murphy
- 1983: Patrick Kelly
- 1984: A.D. Van Nostrand
- 1986: Elizabeth Evans
- 1991: Kenneth Knoespel
- 1997: Richard Grusin
- 2001: Robert Kolker
- 2002: Kenneth J. Knoespel
- 2009: Jay P. Telotte
- 2012: Richard Utz
- 2021: Melissa Ianetta

== Degrees and Programs ==
- Writing and Communication Program: Provides campus-wide instruction in multimodal communication: Written, Oral, Visual, Electronic, and Nonverbal.
- Minors: Black Media Studies, East Asia Studies; Film & Media Studies; Health, Medicine, & Society; Science Fiction Studies; Science, Technology, & Society; Social Justice; Women, Science & Technology;
- Certificate programs: American Literature & Culture; Film Studies; Literary & Cultural Studies
- Bachelor of Science Programs: B.S. in Computational Media (collaboratively with the Georgia Tech College of Computing); this degree was created specifically to meet the requirements of the 21st-century labor force; B.S. in literature, Media, and Communication (until 2013 called: Science, Technology, and Culture)
- Five-Year Bachelor of Science/Master of Science Programs: 5-year B.S. M.S. in Science, Technology, and Culture with Media Studies/Digital Media; 5-year B.S. M.S. in Computational Media/Digital Media (collaboratively with the Georgia Tech College of Computing)
- Master of Science Programs: M.S. in Digital Media; M.S. in Human-Computer Interaction (collaboratively with Georgia Tech Schools of Interactive Computing, Psychology, and Industrial Design); M.S. in Global Media and Cultures (collaboratively with Georgia Tech School of Modern Languages).
- Doctor of Philosophy Program: Ph.D. in Digital Media
- Marion L. Brittain Postdoctoral Fellowship: Fellows provide instruction in general education multimodal communication and technical communication

== Research centers ==
Faculty in the School of Literature, Media, and Communication direct a number of interdisciplinary research centers.

- Center for New Media Studies, Director – Ian Bogost
- Georgia Tech Center for the Study of Women, Science, and Technology (WST), co-directors – Mary Frank Fox, Carol Colatrella, Mary Lynn Realff
- Intel Science and Technology Center for Social Computing (ITSC-Social), principal investigator: Carl DiSalvo
- The James and Mary Wesley Center for New Media Education and Research, director – Jay Bolter
- Georgia Tech Communication Center (CommLab), director – Karen Head

== Research labs ==
- Digital Humanities Lab, Coordinator: Lauren Klein
- Science Fiction Lab, Coordinator: Lisa Yaszek
- Design and Social Interaction Studio: Nassim Parvin
- Synaesthetic Media Lab, Coordinator: Ali Mazalek
- Experimental Television Lab, Coordinator: Janet Murray
- Public Design Workshop, Coordinator: Carl DiSalvo
- Adaptive Digital Media Lab, Coordinator: Brian Magerko
- Participatory Publics Lab, Coordinator: Chris Le Dantec
- Digital World & Image Group, Coordinator: Michael Nitsche
- Augmented Environments Lab, Coordinators: Jay Bolter, Blair MacIntyre, Maribeth Gandy

== Impact ==
The School of Literature, Media, and Communication includes a number of nationally and internationally known thought leaders who influence public opinion and policy: Ian Bogost, a scholar of Games Studies and object-oriented ontology and contributing editor at The Atlantic, was featured on the Colbert Report; Janet Murray, author of Hamlet on the Holodeck (1998) and Inventing the Medium: Principles of Interaction Design as Cultural Practice (2011), is a leading interaction designer and scholar in digital narrative and digital humanities; Karen Head, Director of the Georgia Tech Communication Center, is a widely known voice on Massive Open Online Courses (MOOC) in Composition Studies; Anne Pollock's Medicating Race: Heart Disease and Durable Preoccupations with Difference (2013), a recognized investigation in the history of biomedicine and culture, was featured on MSNBC's Melissa Harris-Perry Show. Jay P. Telotte, author of Science Fiction TV (2014), regularly contributes to issues in film history and science fiction in the national media. Brian Magerko, who works at the intersection of computation and creativity, is one of the driving forces behind EarSketch, a project funded by a $3 million grant from the National Science Foundation (NSF) that uses computational music remixing and sharing as a tool to drive engagement and interest in computing among high school students. Philip Auslander is considered one of the world experts in the study of aesthetic and cultural performance, with notable monographs on "liveness" and "glam rock." In 2014, Georgia Institute of Technology President G.P. "Bud" Peterson defined the School's contributions to the university as follows: "Georgia Tech scientists and engineers deal in the measurable, the observable, the quantifiable, and the testable. We can tell you what, when, and where, how big, how little, how hot, how cold, how fast, how slow...almost anything that you could express in numbers or other data. But the why, the why not, and the what next—answers to those questions represent the invisible, unpredictable, immeasurable context undergirding the exacting, nitty-gritty work of science. Those perspectives are not science or technology themselves, but they always hover nearby. Our L[iterature] M[edia] C[ommunication] disciplines equip Georgia Tech students to make the connection."
