= Mary Helen =

Mary Helen may refer to:

== People ==
- Mary Helen Bowers (born 1979), American celebrity fitness guru, entrepreneur, author, and former ballet dancer
- Mary Helen Carlisle (1869–1925), South African-born British painter
- Mary Helen Garcia (born 1937), American politician
- Mary Helen Goldsmith, British plant physiologist
- Mary Helen Johnston (born 1945), American scientist and former astronaut
- Mary Helen Mahar (1913–1998), American librarian
- Mary Helen McPhillips (1931–1998), Canadian television personality
- Mary Helen Peck Crane (1827–1891), American church- and temperance activist, and writer; mother of writer Stephen Crane
- Mary Helen Ponce (born 1938), American Chicana writer
- Mary Helen Rasmussen (1930–2008), American musicologist, writer, and editor
- Mary Helen Roberts (born 1947), American politician
- Mary Helen Stefaniak, Hungarian-born American writer
- Mary Helen Washington (born 1941), African-American literary scholar
- Mary Helen Wingate Lloyd (1868–1934), American horticulturist
- Mary Helen Wright Greuter (1914–1997), American astronomer and historian
- Mary Helen Young (1883–1945), Scottish nurse and resistance fighter

== Places ==
- Mary Helen, Kentucky
