= Mary Agnes =

Mary Agnes may refer to:

- Mary Agnes Bishop (1857–1934), American journalist and newspaper editor- and publisher
- Mary Agnes Briand (1870–1955), French Catholic nun and Marist missionary in Fiji
- Mary Agnes Canty (1879–1950), Australian-born New Zealand Roman Catholic nun, teacher, and nursing school matron
- Mary Agnes Donoghue (born 1943), American screenwriter and director
- Mary Agnes Hickson (1821–1899), Irish antiquarian and genealogist
- Mary Agnes Moroney (1928–2003), American woman who, as a child, was kidnapped
- Mary Agnes Snively (1847–1933), Canadian nurse
- Mary Agnes Tincker (1833–1907), American novelist
- Mary Agnes Wall (1919–1983), American golfer
- Mary Agnes Yerkes (1886–1989), American impressionist painter, photographer, and artisan
