= Mary Jean =

Mary Jean may refer to:

- Mary Jean Balse-Pabayo, full name of Ging Balse (born 1983), Filipina volleyball player
- Mary Jean Bowman (1908–2002), American economist
- Mary Jean Chan (born 1990), Hong Hong-Chinese poet, lecturer, editor, and critic
- Mary Jean Collins (born 1939), American feminist
- Mary Jean Crenshaw Tully (1925–2003), American women's rights activist
- Mary Jean Eisenhower (born 1955), American humanitarian
- Mary Jean Gilmore (1865–1962), Australian writer and journalist
- Mary Jean Harrold (1947–2013), American computer scientist
- Mary Jean Lastimosa, Filipina beauty pageant titleholder
- Mary-Jean O'Doherty, Australian-American coloratura soprano
- Mary Jean Reimer (born 1964), Hong Kong solicitor and actress
- Mary Jean Simpson (1888–1977), American academic and administrator
- Mary Jean St. Claire, American contestant on The Amazing Race (American TV series)
- Mary Jean Stone (1853–1908), English historical writer
- Mary Jean Thompson, American politician
- Mary Jean Tomlin, birth name of Lily Tomlin (born 1939), American actress, comedian, writer, singer, and producer
- Mary Jean Vargas (Born 1989), American adult film actress

== See also ==
- Mary Jeanne
