= Mary Tate =

Mary Tate may refer to:

- Mary Lee Tate (1893–1939), American visual artist and teacher
- Mary Magdalena Lewis Tate (1871–1930), African American evangelist
- Mary Tate, a character in the American TV series Studio 60 on the Sunset Strip
- Mary Tate, a character in the 1976 American film Stay Hungry
- Mary Tate, a character in the 1924 American silent film Miami (1924 film)
- Mary Tate, a character in the play Da

== See also ==
- Mary Tate Engels (born 1943), American writer
