= Mary Olivia =

Mary Olivia may refer to:

- Mary Olivia Charteris, birth name of Lady Mary Charteris (born 1987), English fashion model, DJ, and musician; past member of English electronic rock band The Big Pink
- Mary Olivia Gowan (1888–1977), American nurse, Roman Catholic nun, and academic
- Mary Olivia Kennedy (1880–1943), Irish journalist
- Mary Olivia Nutting (1831–1910), American author and librarian
