= EarSketch =

Free educational programming environment

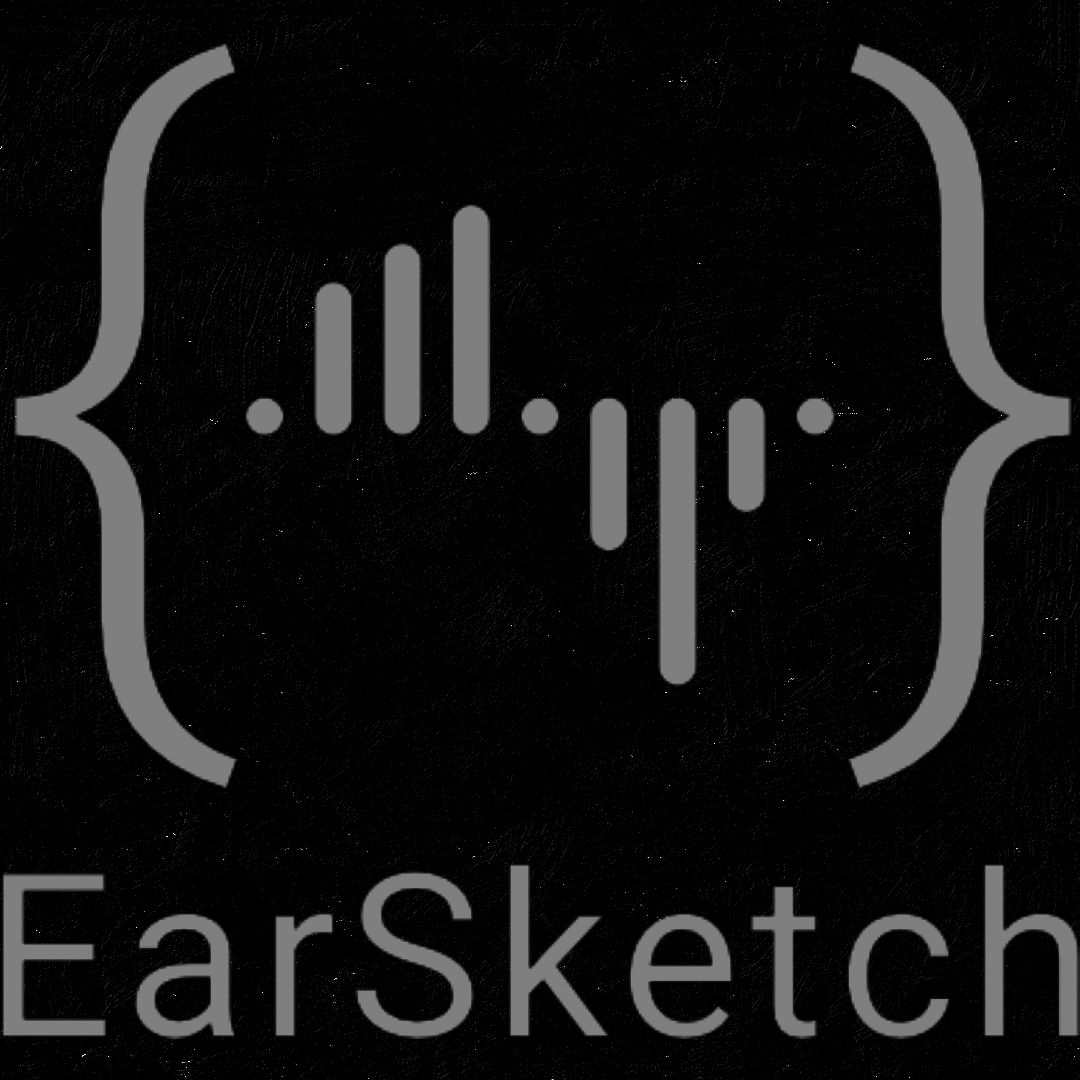
- Website type: Online education
- Available in: English
- Creator: Georgia Institute of Technology
- Website: https://earsketch.gatech.edu
- Commercial: No
- Users: 996,578
- Launched: 2011
- Content license: Georgia Tech Research Corporation license
- Written in: JavaScript (client), Java (server)

EarSketch is a free educational programming environment. Its core purpose is to teach coding in two widely used languages, Python and JavaScript, through music composing and remixing. This learning environment was developed first at Georgia Institute of Technology, (from 2011) under Prof. Jason Freeman (School of Music) and Prof. Brian Magerko (School of Literature, Media, and Communication).

EarSketch is web-based, which means users can access it with a web browser, and with no installation. No account is required to create projects or view existing projects.

EarSketch comprises different elements: a curriculum, a digital audio workstation (or DAW), a code editor, console, and a sound browser. EarSketch's sound library was created by Young Guru, Jay Z's sound engineer, and famous sound designer Richard Devine.

== Purpose ==
EarSketch has two main goals: to make computer science more engaging for students, and to diversify the population of students interested in computer science.

=== Engagement in computer science at school ===
The US has a shortage of computer science students, not only because not all schools are offering CS classes, but also because students do not enroll in such classes. A study published in 2009 states: "The percentage of U.S. high school students taking STEM courses has increased over the last 20 years across all STEM disciplines except computer science where it dropped from 25% to 19%". Considering this, and the fact that all fields of the economy incorporate computing in their operations, EarSketch proposes to motivate students to enroll in CS classes and to pursue CS studies in higher education. EarSketch attempts to reach this goal by adding a musical side to coding. This strategy is a STEAMs approach to education that integrates arts into STEM teaching. A study conducted at Georgia Tech showed statistically significant results in this domain: students who study with EarSketch have been shown to make progress both in content knowledge and attitude towards CS (self-confidence, motivation, intent to persist, etc.).

=== Participation in computing ===
Today female and minority students in CS classes are, like in other engineering fields, underrepresented (with 22% of female students, 13% of African American students in US classes in 2015). EarSketch has demonstrated success in tackling this issue, partly because of the focus on popular genres of music such as dubstep, and because EarSketch provides a creative, expressive, and authentic environment (since students compose their own music).

== History ==
=== Origin of the name EarSketch ===
The name EarSketch originated in a different project from co-creators Freeman and Magerko focused on collaborative composition and music analysis via drawing. That project never came to fruition, but the idea of collaborative music-making (and the name) remained in a new project focused more on coding and computer science education. Though sketching is no longer a focus of EarSketch, the environment does offer drawing and animation features through P5.

=== First version: Reaper-based desktop application ===
The initial version of EarSketch, released in 2012, was built inside of REAPER, a commercial digital audio workstation with extensive support for coding via the ReaScript API for Python and the JavaScript plugin authoring architecture. As the project grew, the Reaper-based version of EarSketch was eventually retired due to its dependence on commercial software, the inability of the team to create an integrated user interface to author code, view musical results in the DAW, find sounds, and challenges installing the software in school computer labs.

=== Current version: web application ===
The project then evolved to become a website in 2014. This allowed students to start coding without having to download software. The website uses the Web Audio API and runs on a private server. New versions are release approximately once per month. EarSketch is not just a software: the EarSketch team works hand in hand with teachers to build the curriculum, and trains teachers every year in summer professional development workshops.

=== Funding ===
EarSketch received funding from the National Science Foundation (NSF) (CNS #1138469, DRL #1417835, DUE #1504293, and DRL #1612644), the Scott Hudgens Family Foundation, the Arthur M. Blank Family Foundation, and the Google Inc. Fund of Tides Foundation.

== Sections ==
EarSketch is a web application, and when opening a session, users see different sections: the curriculum, the code editor, the console, the Digital Audio Workstation, and the browser.

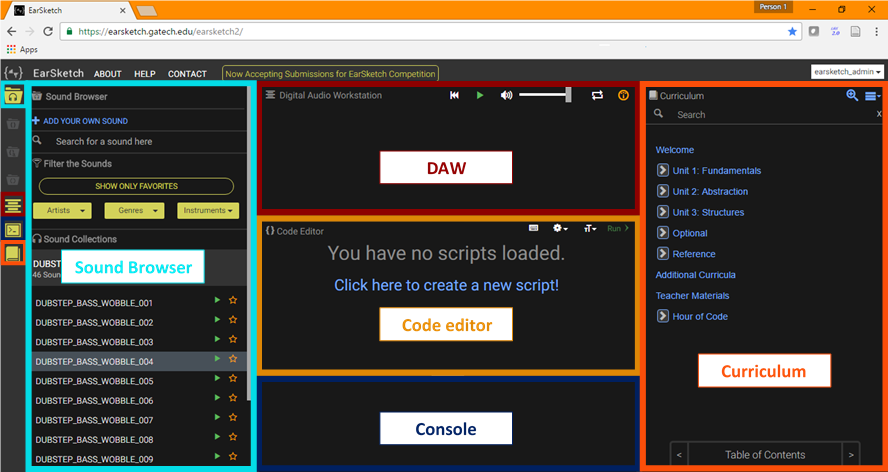
EarSketch sections

=== The curriculum ===
The curriculum is aligned with AP Computer Science Principles but can be used in any introductory programming course.
Each chapter has several sections, a summary, a quiz, screencasts, and associated slides. The curriculum is positioned in the right side of the window. It is a textbook for EarSketch that includes chapters about major computing principles, Python and JavaScript, as well as an introduction to computer science. The curriculum is divided in the following sections:

- 3 units, namely:
  - Unit 1 is an introduction to EarSketch, computing and to basic musical concepts (tempo and pitch, effects...),
  - Unit 2 focuses on loops, string operations, musical form and beat,
  - Unit 3 introduces conditionals, data structures, and randomness,
- Optional more in-depth chapters,
- The API documentation, which describes all the functions that are specific to EarSketch,
- A university-level introduction to computer science section,
- Teacher materials, which include lesson plans, examples, slides, and evaluation tools.
- An Hour of code tutorial: Hour of code is a worldwide initiative to engage students in computer science, by providing 60 minute-long ludic introduction tutorials (for instance with Minecraft or Frozen components). This particular tutorial is an introduction to computer science where students compose their first song with EarSketch.

The units are divided into chapters. Each chapter has several sections, a summary, a quiz, and associated slides. The curriculum contains Python and JavaScript example code that can be pasted into the code editor.

=== The code editor and console ===
EarSketch's code editor is located in the window at the center of the page. When the code is executed, it will create the music in the Digital Audio Workstation. If there is an error in the code, a message explaining the error will appear in the console, located under the code editor.

=== The digital audio workstation ===
A digital audio workstation (DAW) is a tool used by a majority of music producers which helps manipulate audio samples (or audio files), add effects, and accomplish other tasks in the composition process. EarSketch's DAW is located in the top center section, above the code editor. It contains tracks: each line is a track, and corresponds to an instrument. With code commands, the user will add sound samples in these tracks, as well as effects, such as volume changes, reverberation, delay, etc. When the code is executed, the DAW will be filled with the sound samples, and the user can play the music they just coded.

=== The browser: scripts and sounds ===
In order to compose music, EarSketch coders can use samples. Audio samples are located in the sound browser, in the left window, which allows for sound file search, and personal sound file upload. In the left section, users can also show the script browser. A script is a code file, and different scripts will create different musics in the DAW.

== Main feature examples ==
Although the code written in the code editor will be either in Python or JavaScript, there are EarSketch-specific functions that allow for the user to accomplish music related tasks. Here are some examples:

- One of the basic functions of EarSketch is fitMedia(), which places a sample sound in the Digital Audio Workstation.
- Another important function is MakeBeat(), that takes as input a string and a file name. The string corresponds to times when the file should be played, sustained, or when there should be silence. This is a common way of creating percussive lines in music programming languages. For instance, in EarSketch, '0' indicates that the file should play, then '-' means a silence, and '+' means keep playing the sample. So if we use the string "0-000+++", it means play the audio file on the first sixteenth note, then there is a silence, then the file is played three times in a row, and finally, the file keeps playing through the three last sixteenth notes.
- Another example would be setEffect(), which adds effects to a track. Effects are common in Digital Audio Workstations as they are an indispensable element of music production. Here are some examples of effects:
  - Volume: this modifies the loudness of a track. It can be used to emphasize a particular track compared to the rest of the instruments. It can also be used to fade in and fade out the music to have a smoother beginning and end.
  - Reverb: this makes the samples sound like they were being played in a room that echoes the sounds.
  - Delay: this produces an artificial echo.
  - Frequency filters: these will modify the sound by either attenuating or highlighting certain frequencies.
