= Christ in the House of Martha and Mary (disambiguation) =

Christ in the House of Martha and Mary is an episode in the Gospel of Luke.

It may also refer to:

- Christ in the House of Martha and Mary (Velázquez), a painting by Diego Velázquez
- Christ in the House of Martha and Mary (Vermeer), a painting by Johannes Vermeer
- Christ at the home of Mary and Martha, a painting by Henry Ossawa Tanner

== See also ==
- Mary and Martha (disambiguation)
