= Mary Ethel =

Mary Ethel is a feminine given name. Notable people with the name include:

- Mary Ethel Creswell (1879–1960), American academic
- Mary Ethel Florey (1900–1966), Australian doctor and medical scientist
- Mary Ethel Hughes (1874–1958), Australian wife of Billy Hughes
- Mary Ethel Muir Donaldson (1876–1958), British author and photography pioneer
- Mary Ethel Seaton (1887–1974), British scholar of English literature
- Mary Ethel Williams Barrett (1913–1951), American artist, art teacher, and museum director
