= Mary Evelyn (disambiguation) =

Mary Evelyn (1632–1709) was an English letter writer.

Mary Evelyn may also refer to:

- Mary Evelyn (poet) (1665–1685), English poet
- Mary Evelyn Atkinson (1899–1974), English children's writer
- Mary Evelyn Fredenburg (1923–2020), American nurse, and a missionary in Nigeria
- Mary Evelyn Hitchcock (1849–1920), American author and explorer
- Mary Evelyn Lentaigne (1920–2024), British medical artist and Red Cross nurse
- Mary Evelyn Martin (1919–1978), British wife of politician Quintin Hogg, Baron Hailsham of St Marylebone
- Mary Evelyn Parker (1920–2015), American education, newspaper editor, and politician
- Mary Evelyn Rhodes (1925–2018), British author and historian
- Mary Evelyn Tucker, American religion academic and ecologist
- Mary Evelyn Wood (1900–1978), Caymanian politician and nurse
- Mary Evelyn Wrinch (1877–1969), Canadian artist
