= Mary Claire =

Mary Claire may refer to:

- Mary Claire Engstrom (1906–1997), American writer and historian
- Mary Claire Helldorfer, American young adult- and children's author
- Mary-Claire King (born 1946), American geneticist
- Mary-Claire Carter, a fictional character in the UK medical drama TV series Holby City

== See also ==
- Marie Claire
- Mary Clare (disambiguation)
