= Mary Clare (disambiguation) =

Mary Clare (1892–1970) was a British actress of stage, film and television.

Mary Clare may also refer to:

- Mary Clare Brassington (1874–1966), American suffragist
- Mary Clare de Graffenried (1849–1921), American labor researcher and writer
- Mary Clare Kennedy, 17th-century Irish nun
- Mary Clare Millea, American former superior general of the Apostles of the Sacred Heart of Jesus
- Mary Clare Moore (1814–1874), Irish Sister of Mercy, Crimean War nurse and teacher
- Mary Clare Therese Champagne (died 1958), American victim of the Our Lady of the Angels School fire

== See also ==
- Mary Claire (disambiguation)
