= Mary Letitia =

Mary Letitia may refer to:

- Mary Letitia Caldwell (1890–1972), American chemist
- Mary Letitia Green (1886–1978), British botanist and bibliographer
- Mary Letitia Jones, American librarian
- Mary Letitia Martin (1815–1850), Irish writer
