= Muffy Styler =

Muffy Styler Jenny Lee Mitchell
- Born: 1 May 1973 (age 53); New York City
- Occupation: Musician
- Instruments: Singer, entertainer, musician (clarinet, percussion)
- Years active: 1995 − present
- Website: www.muffystyler.com

Muffy Styler is the professional name of Jenny Lee Mitchell, an American-born jazz singer, musician and performer based in New York City. She is a vocalist who also plays clarinet and percussion and regularly hosts burlesque/variety shows at The Slipper Room in Manhattan. At various speakeasies around the city, she is both singer and clarinetist with the Jazz Bastards, one of several musical groups with which she performs. As major musical influences, she counts Ella Fitzgerald, Sarah Vaughan, Anita O’Day and Mel Torme.

== Career ==
Born May 1, 1973, in New York City, she is the daughter of a writer/actor mother and award-winning Broadway stage designer David Mitchell. In her teens, she began playing keyboards with the punk band Die Hausfrauen, later attending New York University concentrating on musical improvisation and experimental theater. A college production in Vienna of Oskar Kokoschka's Murder Hope of Women led to vocal studies in Munich and ultimately to working in Europe over the next fifteen years as a singer and actress in numerous large musical productions. Among them: A Christmas Carol, Fame, Cabaret, Hair, Rocky Horror Show, Dance of the Vampires, Mozart! and Ludwig II. In Germany during that time she began creating various jazz programs as a vocalist with pianist Philip Carleston and training with David Shiner in the art of clowning and vaudeville. In 2016 she created the solo show Love und Greed which garnered attention from the New York Times and the city's downtown cabaret scene.

After moving back to New York she began performing as Muffy Styler, hosting variety shows and fronting various jazz combos including the Jazz Bastards, nominated for a MAC Award in 2019 by the Manhattan Association of Cabarets & Clubs. In 2020 she began working as a duo with renowned jazz guitarist Joe Cohn. Barbara Maier Gustern was her vocal teacher from 2015 until 2022.

== Awards ==
- 2019 MAC Award Nomination for best duo or group The Jazz Bastards.
