= Mary Kate =

Mary Kate may refer to:

- Mary-Kate Fisher, American former political appointee
- Mary-Kate Geraghty, birth name of MayKay (born 1986), Irish musician
- MaryKate Glidewell, birth name of Sage Beckett (born 1985), American retired professional wrestler
- Mary Kate McGeehan, American actress and screenwriter
- Mary Kate McGowan, American professor of philosophy, and legal scholar
- Mary-Kate Olsen (born 1986), American businesswoman, fashion designer, equestrian, and former actress
- Mary Kate Schellhardt (born 1978), American actress
- Mary Kate Wiles (born 1987), American film and web series actress
