= Mary Hannah =

Mary Hannah may refer to:

- Mary Hannah Dickson, birth name of May Brahe (1884–1956), Australian composer
- Mary Hannah Frances Ivens (1870–1944), English obstetrician and gynaecologist
- Mary Hannah Fulton (1854–1927), American medical Christian missionary to China
- Mary Hannah Krout (1851–1927), American journalist, author, and advocate for women's suffrage
