= Mary Lyon (disambiguation) =

Mary Lyon (1797–1849) was a pioneering American educator.

Mary Lyon is also the name of:

- Mary F. Lyon (1925–2014), English geneticist
- Mary Lyon (writer) American columnist, political commentator and jewelry designer

== See also ==
- Mary Lyons (born 1947), British writer, Mills and Boon
- Lyon (disambiguation)
