= Mary Claire Helldorfer =

Mary Claire Helldorfer is young adult and children's author. She is a graduate of Mercy High School (Baltimore, Maryland) She has written numerous picture books for children under her real name Mary Claire Helldorfer. She also writes romance novels include Summer in the City, Love at First Click and the romance-mystery Kissed by an Angel under her pen name, Elizabeth Chandler. She is also known for her suspense filled series Dark Secrets.

== Dark Secrets series ==
Dark Secrets 1 (August 4, 2009): the first book in the Dark Secrets series. The book includes two stories, Legacy of Lies and Don't Tell. In Legacy of Lies, Megan has to stay with the uptight grandmother she wants nothing to do with. She's determined to get through the visit without any drama, but when she falls into a twisted love triangle with potentially fatal consequences, Megan may be caught up in her family's legacy in more ways than she realizes. In Don't Tell, Lauren knows that by returning to the town where her mother drowned seven years ago, she'll be reliving one of her most haunting memories. When she arrives, she is propelled into a series of mysterious events that mimic the days leading up to her mother's death. Maybe her mother's drowning wasn't an accident after all...and maybe Lauren is next.

Dark Secrets 2 (May 4, 2010): the second book in the series. The book includes two stories, No Time to Die and The Deep End of Fear. In No Time to Die, Jenny is devastated by the recent death of her sister, Liza. Looking for a sense of closure, she secretly signs up for the drama camp where Liza died. Jenny knows that someone here holds the key to what really happened to Liza that night, but if she doesn't find out the truth soon, she may become the next victim. In The Deep End of Fear, Kate has tried to bury the horrible memories associated with the Westbrook estate. After her best friend Ashley drowned on the estate, Kate vowed never to return. But now, twelve years later, she is drawn back towards the house and that fatal icy pond. There, Kate still feels Ashley's presence and the past seems to be pulling her back towards Ashley's life-threatening dares.

Dark Secrets 3: The Back Door of Midnight (November 16, 2010): the third book in the series. Anna knows her family is crazy. But when she goes to visit her aunt and uncle for the summer and learns that her uncle’s charred body has been found, her life reaches a new level of insanity. Her erratic aunt’s “psychic” abilities are exaggerated by her grief, and have become borderline violent. Alone in an unfamiliar town, Anna struggles to pick up the pieces and establish any sense of normalcy. She desperately wants to trust Zack, the cute boy next door, but even he might know more about the incident than he is letting on. But when Anna starts feeling an inexplicable pull to the site of her uncle’s murder, she begins to believe that her family’s supernatural gifts are real after all. Torn between loyalty and suspicion, Anna is certain of only one thing: she must discover who killed her uncle or she could be next.

== Kissed By An Angel series ==
Written under the pseudonym Elizabeth Chandler:
1. Kissed by an Angel (1995)
2. The Power of Love (1995)
3. Soulmates (1995)
4. Evercrossed (2011)
5. Everlasting (29 Mar 2012)
6. Everafter (19 Mar 2013)

Kissed by an Angel / Power of Love / Soulmates (omnibus) (1998)
