= Meritamen (given name) =

i mn n mr i i t B1
Meritamen
in hieroglyphs

i mn n N36 t B1
Meritamen
in hieroglyphs

Meritamen, also spelled Meritamun, Merytamen, Meryetamen (mrỉỉ.t-ỉmn; “Beloved of Amun”) is an ancient Egyptian female name. Its male counterpart is Meryamen or Meryamun.

Its notable bearers are:

- Ahmose-Meritamen, princess, probably a daughter of Seqenenre Tao II (17th dynasty)
- Ahmose-Meritamen, queen, wife of Amenhotep I (18th dynasty)
- Meritamen C, princess and God's Wife, a daughter of Thutmose III and Merytre-Hatshepsut (18th dynasty)
- Meritamen D, princess, another daughter of Thutmose III and Merytre-Hatshepsut (18th dynasty)
- Meritamen E, princess and queen, daughter of Ramesses II and Nefertari (19th dynasty)
- Meritamen F, a Singer of Amun (21st dynasty). Daughter of Menkheperre and Isetemkheb (C), and hence a granddaughter of Pinudjem I.
- Meritamen G, princess, owner of an Abydos stela dated to the 25th dynasty by style. It is unknown which pharaoh she was related to.

As a throne name:

- Twosret (Sitre Meritamen)
