= Mary Beth =

Mary Beth may refer to:

- Mary Beth Barone (born 1991), American comedian
- Mary Beth Canty, American politician
- Mary Beth Carozza (born 1961), American politician
- Mary Beth Decker, American cast member of Road Rules: South Pacific
- Mary Beth Dolin (1936–1985), American-born Canadian politician
- Mary Beth Dunnichay (born 1993), American platform diver
- Mary Beth Edelson (1933–2021), American artist and pioneer of the feminist art movement
- Mary Beth Fielder, American writer, director, and producer of television- and feature films
- Mary Beth Harrell, American attorney
- Mary Beth Harshbarger (born 1965), American woman who accidentally shot her husband
- Mary Beth Hurt (born 1946), American retired stage- and screen actress
- Mary Beth Iagorashvili (born 1974), American retired modern pentathlete
- Mary Beth Imes (born 1948), American politician
- Mary Beth Landrum, British-American statistician
- Mary Beth Leatherdale, Canadian author and storyteller
- Mary Beth Leonard (born 1962), American diplomat
- Mary Beth Marley (born 1995), American pair skater
- Mary Beth McKenzie (born 1946), American painter of contemporary figures
- Mary Beth Palmer (1952–2019), American bridge player
- Mary Beth Peil (born 1940), American actress and soprano
- Mary Beth Rondeau (born 1956), Canadian former freestyle swimmer
- Mary Beth Rosson, American director of graduate programs and professor
- Mary Beth Rubens, Canadian film-, stage-, and television actress
- Mary Beth Ruskai (1944–2023), American mathematical physicist and professor of mathematics
- Mary Beth Tinker (born 1952), American free speech activist
- Mary Beth Walz, American politician
- Mary Beth Zimmerman (born 1960), American professional golfer
