= Mary Emma =

Mary Emma may refer to:

- Mary Emma Allison (1917–2010), American school librarian
- Mary Emma Ebsworth (1794–1881), English dramatist
- Mary Emma Holmes (1839–1937), American reformer, suffragist and educator
- Mary Emma Macintosh (died c. 1916), South African suffragist
- Mary Emma Griffith Marshall (1888-1925), American editor and librarian
- Mary Emma Thames (1936–1944), American murder victim
- Mary Emma Woolley (1863–1947), American educator, peace activist and women's suffrage supporter
