= List of Hocus Pocus characters =

The following is a list of characters who appear throughout the Hocus Pocus franchise.

== Main characters ==
=== The Sanderson Sisters ===
The Sanderson Sisters are a trio of witch sisters who lived during the time of the Salem Witch Trials. In 1693, the Sanderson sisters killed Emily Binx by draining her life force and transformed her brother Thackery into a black cat, cursing him with immortality. Shortly afterward, the Sandersons were captured by a mob and executed by hanging. Before dying, Winifred cast a spell declaring that on Halloween night when the moon is full, a virgin will summon them back from the dead, allowing them to once again claim the lives of all the children in Salem. In 1993, the sisters are revived when someone lights the Black Flame Candle, which resurrects them. However, they will only live for one day unless they manage to claim the life force of another child. Despite the Sandersons' efforts, they fail to obtain the life force they need and die when the sun rises.

In the second film, set 29 years later in 2022, the Sandersons are resurrected once again when two girls Becca and Izzy light a new Black flame candle. However, Winifred inadvertently kills Sarah and Mary after using a spell that takes what the caster values most as the price for the power. Heartbroken, Winifred casts another spell that disintegrates her and reunites her with her sisters in the afterlife. In Hocus Pocus 2, drag queens Ginger Minj, Kornbread Jeté, and Kahmora Hall impersonate Winifred, Mary, and Sarah, respectively, during a costume contest.

==== Winifred Sanderson ====
Winifred "Winnie" Sanderson (portrayed primarily by Bette Midler; Taylor Paige Henderson as a younger version of the character in Hocus Pocus 2) is the eldest and most intelligent witch of the three. She is the most powerful of the three sisters, she has control of their magic book and therefore is most adept at casting spells. She also has the ability to cast electricity from her fingers.

Winifred makes an appearance in the video game Disney Emoji Blitz. She is a playable character who has the ability to resurrect the most recently used powerups from the grave. She and her sisters, Mary and Sarah, are currently the only playable Hocus Pocus characters.

Winifred appears as a playable character in Disney Heroes: Battle Mode; she was originally introduced to the game during the 2021 Halloween season.

Winifred and her sisters returned in a special Castle Show at the Magic Kingdom called the Hocus Pocus Villain Spectacular. During the show she and her sisters try to brew the perfect Halloween Potion, receiving assistance from various Disney Villains. She is not respectful towards the first two characters but she treats Maleficent with respect. After completing the Potion, she celebrates by singing "I Put a Spell on You".

Winifred and her sisters appeared in a special Hocus Pocus reunion on October 30, 2020, titled In Search of the Sanderson Sisters: A Hocus Pocus Hulaween Takeover. The event was to raise money for the New York Restoration Project and had the return of all three main cast members who portrayed the witches in the 1993 film. In the special, Mariah Carey answers the door for Winifred and says "Well if it isn't Winnie Sanderson, looking for a candy bar. I got news for you girl – Halloween's nearly over, so scat!" Immediately afterward, "All I Want For Christmas is You" plays in the background.

==== Mary Sanderson ====
Mary Sanderson (portrayed primarily by Kathy Najimy; Nina Kitchen as a younger version of the character in Hocus Pocus 2) is the middle witch, who lived during the time of Salem Witch Trials, along with her two sisters: Winifred and Sarah. She has the ability to “sniff out children” and so is the sister responsible for detecting children.

Mary makes an appearance in the video game Disney Emoji Blitz. She is a playable character who has the ability to sniff out emojis and steal their souls for extra time.

Mary appears as a playable character in Disney Heroes: Battle Mode; she was originally introduced to the game during the 2021 Halloween season.

Mary, along with her sisters, returned in a Halloween-themed Castle Show during Mickey's Not-So-Scary Halloween Party entitled the Hocus Pocus Villain Spectacular. She and her sisters try to brew a special Halloween potion and receive assistance from various Disney villains. After successfully completing the potion she joins Sarah in singing and dancing backup while Winifred sings "I Put a Spell on You".

==== Sarah Sanderson ====
Sarah Sanderson (portrayed primarily by Sarah Jessica Parker; Juju Brener as a younger version of the character in Hocus Pocus 2) is the youngest and most beautiful but air-headed witch who lived during the time of Salem Witch Trials, along with her two sisters: Winifred and Mary. Sarah is a siren and her magic lures children to the sisters through singing.

Sarah makes an appearance in the video game Disney Emoji Blitz. She is a playable character who has the ability to lure in emojis with her siren song. She and her sisters, Winifred and Mary, are currently the only playable Hocus Pocus characters.

Sarah, alongside Billy, appears as a playable character in Disney Heroes: Battle Mode; she was originally introduced to the game during the 2021 Halloween season.

Sarah and her sisters began appearing in a special Halloween-themed Castle Show at Disney's Magic Kingdom in 2015 as a part of Mickey's Not-So-Scary Halloween Party entitled the Hocus Pocus Villain Spectacular. Sarah kicks off the festivities by sending out the call to the dancers for assistance by singing "Come Little Children". She and her sisters also get help from fellow Disney villains to make their potion but like in the movie, she is flirtatious towards the male cast, especially when she interacts with Dr. Facilier. After completing their potion, she and Mary back up Winifred as she sings "I Put a Spell on You" and dances with various villains.

=== Book ===
Book is a living spell book that the Sanderson Sisters use. It has an eye on its cover, with which it shows its emotions.

The book is mentioned in official records pertaining Sanderson sisters, at some point in time, after being scorned by the infidelity of Winifred Sanderson's lover Billy Butcherson with her sister Sarah. Winifred allegedly decided to sell her soul, and possibly the souls of Sarah and their other sister Mary, to Satan himself and received the spellbook, which was said to be protected by magic, and bound in human skin. The spell book is seen to be Winifred's most prized possession.

=== Billy Butcherson ===
William "Billy" Butcherson (portrayed by Doug Jones in the films and Austin J. Ryan as a younger version of the character in Hocus Pocus 2) is a supporting character in the film series. He was the obsession of Winifred Sanderson, whom she poisoned after she believed he cheated on her with her youngest sister, Sarah. In 1993, Butcherson was brought back to life as a zombie by Winifred as an act to retrieve her spell book. After the Sandersons are killed, Billy is returned to the grave. Billy returns in Hocus Pocus 2, where he confronts Gilbert when Gilbert digs up his grave as part of a spell. After the Sandersons are killed once more, Billy fades away.

== Hocus Pocus ==
=== Max Dennison ===
Max Dennison (portrayed by Omri Katz) is a teenage boy who is shown to have hatred against Halloween. However, when he accidentally resurrects the Sanderson sisters, Max and his friends forcibly halt their advances and stop them for good.

At the start of the film, Max is shown to be angry because he and his family just moved from Los Angeles, California to Salem, Massachusetts. (Note: According to a deleted scene, his parents moved because they wanted their children to be in a safe clean environment.) He misses his friends and does not quite fit in with his classmates who believe in the supernatural mythology. One particular classmate he has a crush on is Allison.

Max is shown to rather dislike Halloween and does not believe in magic or the supernatural, believing Halloween to simply be an invention for confectionery companies to make additional profit. Thus, he is rather displeased at having to take Dani trick-or-treating, thus taking his anger out on Dani, causing her to become upset with him, but Max apologizes and she forgives him soon after. When visiting the Sanderson sisters' cottage with Dani and Allison, he cynically lights the black flame candle, disbelieving it will resurrect the Sanderson sisters, against Dani and Allison's warnings. However, he is shocked when his lighting of the candle does indeed resurrect the sisters and thus is forced to fight and defeat them before sunrise with the help of Dani, Allison, and Thackery Binx. He is shown to be rather cunning when dealing with the sisters; he exploits their lack of understanding and knowledge of the 20th century and tricks them into believing he is a wizard who can summon "the burning rain of death" (in reality water from fire sprinkles) and that his parents' car headlights are in fact a sign of early sunrise. During the final battle in the graveyard with the sisters, in order to free Dani from Winifred's clutches, he consumes the life potion, making himself liable to life absorption. Just as Winifred attempts to consume his life force, she touches the hallowed ground of the graveyard and is thus petrified due to inherent unholiness, and is then reduced to green dust by sunrise, allowing Max to live. After the whole ordeal, he officially becomes Allison's boyfriend.

=== Dani Dennison ===
Dani Dennison (portrayed by Thora Birch) is the younger sister of Max Dennison, who loved Halloween and always taunts him. In the film, she develops a strong bond with Thackery Binx, and is the primary target of Winifred Sanderson, whom she called ugly.

=== Allison Watts ===
Allison Watts (portrayed by Vinessa Shaw) is the crush and later girlfriend of Max Dennison.

Allison's first appearance in the film is giving the correct information about the main idea about Halloween in Miss Olin's classroom at Jacob Bailey High School when Max gives the wrong answer. She assists him and his sister, Dani Dennison, in visiting the Sanderson sisters' cottage on Halloween night, in which she unsuccessfully attempts to persuade Max not to light the black flame candle, which subsequently resurrects the sisters. She subsequently helps Max and Dani defeat them before sunrise to stop them from killing and consuming the life force of children, allowing them to become immortal. She demonstrates a good knowledge of the occult and supernatural when fighting them, such as when she applied rings of salt for protection against their dark magic, leading Winifred Sanderson to mockingly label her "a clever little white witch". Following the sisters' death and defeat at sunrise, she officially becomes Max's girlfriend.

=== Thackery Binx ===
Thackery Binx (portrayed by Sean Murray in human form; voiced by Jason Marsden in cat form) is a boy who lived around 1693 and was transformed into an immortal black cat by the Sandersons after they killed his sister Emily. In 1993, 300 years after, the Sanderson sisters are revived due to a black flame candle being accidentally lit by Max Dennison. When the Sandersons are killed, Thackery is freed from his curse and departs for the afterlife.

=== Emily Binx ===
Emily Binx (portrayed by Amanda Shepherd) is a minor character in the first film. She is the younger sister of Thackery Binx.

One morning in Salem, Massachusetts on Halloween in 1693, Emily is lured out of her home by the beautiful singing of the witch, Sarah Sanderson. Entranced by her voice and deaf to Thackery Binx's frantic cries, she willingly follows Sarah into the woods all the way to the Sanderson Sisters' cottage. Bewitched, she sits docilely in a chair and obediently drinks their life potion, failing to recognize Thackery when he barges in to rescue her. The potion causes Emily's life force to become visible, allowing the sisters to steal it in order to restore their own youth and vitality. In seconds, they are once again youthful, and Emily is reduced to a withered husk. She stirs feebly for a few moments but soon dies of age. Three hundred years later, Emily's spirit finally welcomes Thackery to the afterlife, complaining that she has waited for him for a long time. The sisters had cursed him to live forever in the form of a black cat, but with their deaths, the curse is broken, and he is at last allowed to reunite with Emily and they cross over into the afterlife.

=== Jay Taylor and Ice ===
Jay Taylor (portrayed by Tobias Jelinek), and Ernie (portrayed by Larry Bagby), better known as Ice, are Max Dennison's bullies, who addresses Max as "Hollywood".

Jay and Ice are first seen stealing Max's shoes when Max says he does not have cash or bud for them. Jay is later seen stealing candy from trick-or-treaters with Ice when they encounter Max once again. This time, they ask him about his costume which happens to be a "Little Leaguer" as referred by Max's sister, Dani Dennison. They then try to force her to pay a toll in order to pass them, but Max steps in by giving them his candy.

Later at 3:00 a.m., Ice and Jay are trying to think of some other activity to do (due to most of the Halloween activities having ended at this hour) when they encounter the Sanderson sisters, who abduct them and lock them up in cages hanging from the ceiling in their cottage in response to Jay referring them as "ugly chicks", which offends them, with Sarah Sanderson tormenting Jay by spinning his cage, causing him to get sick. Later, when Max and Allison arrive to rescue Dani, whom the sisters have abducted, Ice and Jay beg to be saved, to which Max responds by taking back his shoes from Ice and leaving them in their cages as payback for their bullying.

=== Dave and Jenny Dennison ===
David "Dave" Dennison (portrayed by Charles Rocket) and Jennifer "Jenny" Dennison (portrayed by Stephanie Faracy) are Max and Dani's parents. They attend a Halloween party where Dave is dressed as a vampire and Jenny as Madonna, where along with the other adults they end up hypnotized by a spell cast by the Sanderson sisters, under which they do not stop dancing until the witches are defeated.

=== "Master" and "Medusa" ===
"Master" (portrayed by Garry Marshall) and "Medusa" (portrayed by Penny Marshall) are a married couple whom the Sanderson sisters mistake for their master, the Devil, because of his Halloween costume, and Medusa, because of her hair curlers. They have a cameo appearance in Hocus Pocus 2, where in a television is seen their scene from the first film.

== Hocus Pocus 2 ==
=== Becca ===
Becca (portrayed by Whitney Peak) is a 16-year-old teenage girl from high school, alongside her friends, Izzy and Cassie Traske. By using the black flame candle, she accidentally resurrects the Sanderson sisters after 29 years, seeking a plan to defeat the sisters for good. Along the way, Becca discovers she is a witch herself.

=== Izzy ===
Izzy (portrayed by Belissa Escobedo) is one of Becca's friends alongside Cassie Traske. She is a 15 year old teenage girl who, while performing a birthday ritual with her best friend Becca ends up resurrecting the Sanderson sisters after 29 years.

In the film, Izzy and Becca visit a magic shop run by Gilbert, who gives Becca a candle for her sixteenth birthday. The girls light the candle and discover that it is another Black Flame Candle, which brings back the Sanderson Sisters once again. The girls outwit the sisters in a local Walgreens and escape to the magic shop. They learn here that Gilbert tricked them into reviving the witches, having seen them on Halloween in 1993 and been taught how to make the candle by Book, the sisters' magical grimoire.

Izzy and Becca team up with their estranged friend Cassie Traske, who is a descendant of Reverend Traske, the man who banished Winifred Sanderson in 1653. Together, they try to stop the sisters from casting the Magicae Maxima spell. This spell would make them all-powerful and immortal.

Izzy is a brave and loyal friend who is willing to risk her life to save Becca and Salem from the witches. She also has a witty sense of humor and a knack for the occult, as seen when she convinces Becca to try and use the Angelica leaves to break Winifred's curse.

=== Cassie Traske ===
Cassie Traske (portrayed by Lilia Buckingham) is a teenager in high school in Salem, Massachusetts, alongside her friends, Becca, Izzy and her boyfriend Mike.

=== Reverend Traske ===
Reverend Traske (portrayed by Tony Hale) is a reverend of Salem, Massachusetts in the mid-17th century. He is the ancestor of Jefry and Cassie Traske. His name is a nod to the fanatical witch hunter Reverend Trask from the classic gothic horror television serial, Dark Shadows, played in the show by Jerry Lacy.

=== Mother Witch ===
The Mother Witch (portrayed by Hannah Waddingham) is an enigmatic Salem witch who came across Winifred Sanderson, alongside her younger sisters Mary and Sarah, around the 17th century, and introduced them to magic. She is mentioned several times by the Sanderson sisters in the first film. The second film shows the moment when she met the Sanderson sisters and tempted them to teach her magic.

=== Jefry Traske ===
Jefry Traske (portrayed by Tony Hale) is the mayor of Salem, Massachusetts, father of Cassie Traske, and descendant of Reverend Traske.

=== Gilbert ===
Gilbert (portrayed by Sam Richardson as an adult, Jaylin Pryor as a young boy) is a supporting character in the second film. He is the owner of the Olde Salem Magic Shoppe and the Gilbert the Great Ghost Trolley who inadvertently reawakens the Sanderson sisters.

=== Mike ===
Mike (portrayed by Froy Gutierrez) is the boyfriend of Cassie Traske, and the main source of conflict between her and her two best friends Becca and Izzy. He is a popular student at Samuel Skelton High School, where he plays on the football team. He is also a fan of Halloween and likes to dress up in costumes; despite this he gets scared easily, as seen when he got freaked out when Becca whispered the names of vegan foods pretending it was an incantation and when he fainted upon seeing the headless Billy Butcherson.

Mike frequently offends others, mainly Becca and Izzy, by making fun of them without realizing this himself, thinking he is simply making conversation. When this was pointed out to him in the movie, he was visibly upset and said that he has so many people to apologize to.
