= Mary Gertrude (disambiguation) =

Mary Gertrude (1884–1965) was an Irish-born Australian nurse, Roman Catholic nun, and provincial superior.

Mary Gertrude may also refer to:

- Mary Gertrude Banahan (c. 1856–1932), New Zealand Roman Catholic nun and teacher
- Mary Gertrude Enig (1931–2014), American nutritionist and researcher
- Mary Gertrude Haseman (1889–1979), American mathematician
- Mary Gertrude Joyce (1884–1964), Irish-born New Zealand Roman Catholic nun and musician
