= Mary Anna =

Mary Anna may refer to:

- Mary Anna Custis Lee (1807–1873), American wife of Robert E. Lee, slave owner, and socialite
- Mary Anna Day (1852–1924), American botanist and librarian
- Mary Anna Draper (1839–1914), American astronomical photographer and researcher
- Mary Anna Henry (1834–1903), American diarist
- Mary Anna Jackson (1831–1915), American second wife, and subsequently widow, of Stonewall Jackson
- Mary Anna Marten (1929–2010), English aristocrat and landowner
- Mary Anna Needell (1830–1922), English novelist
- Mary Anna Wyall (1922–2017), American aviator
