= Mary Agnes Briand =

French Roman Catholic nun and missionary in Fiji

Mother Mary Agnes SMSM
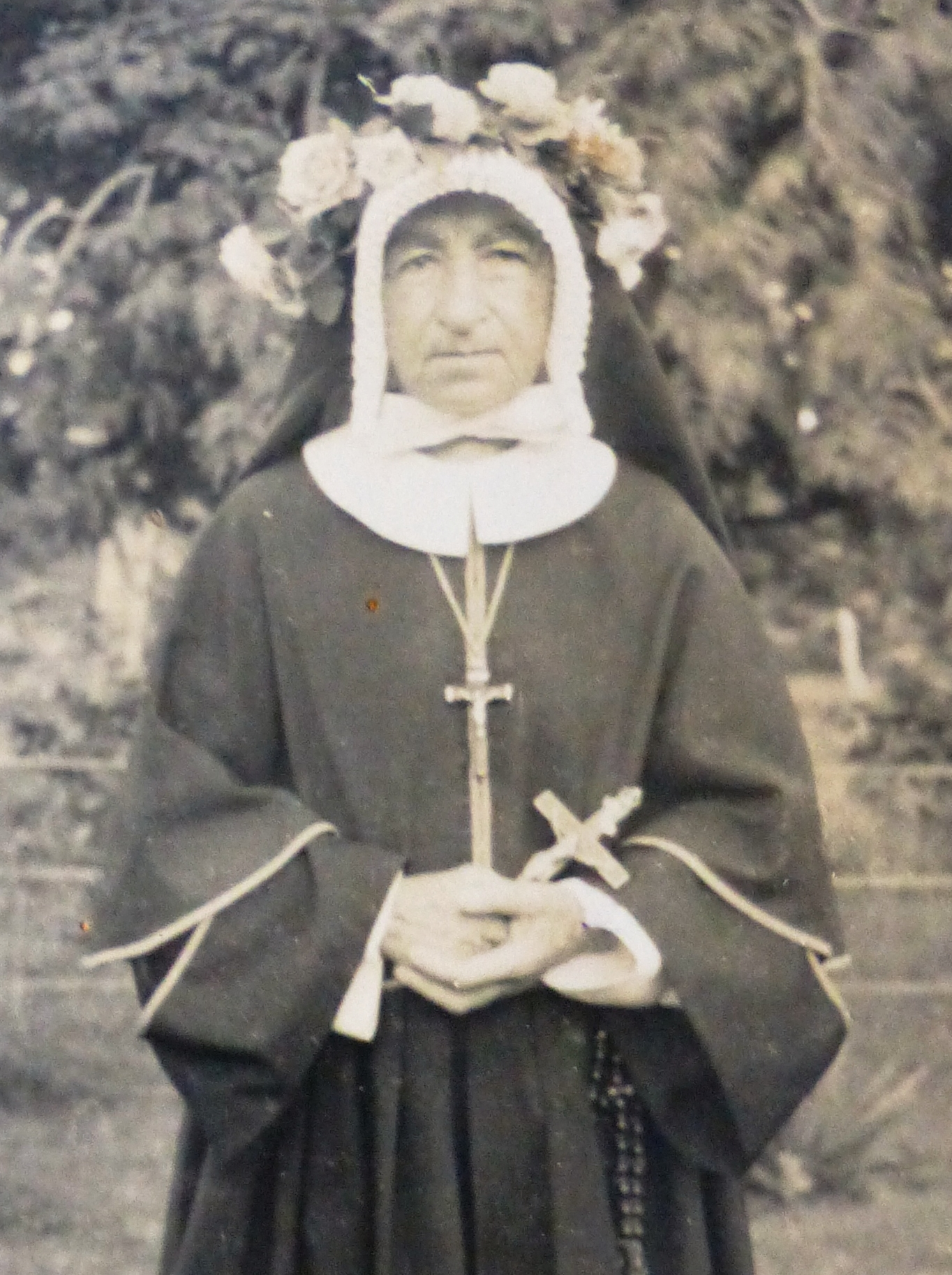
- Mother Mary Agnes of Makogai

Religious, Missionary
- Born: Marie Briand; March 22, 1870; La Prénessaye, Côtes-d'Armor, France
- Died: March 17, 1955 (aged 84); Makogai, Fiji
- Resting place: Makogai lepers colony cemetery Makogai, Fiji

Marie Louise Françoise Briand, in religion Mother Mary Agnes (March 22, 1870, in La Prénessaye – March 17, 1955, on the island of Makogai in Fiji) was a French Catholic nun, Marist missionary in Fiji, . She was regional superior for the Fiji Islands of the Missionary Sisters of the Society of Mary from 1908 to 1946. Devoted to lepers in the Pacific, she was the director of the Makogai leper colony from 1916 to 1950, one of the largest in the world. She was awarded with the Order of the Legion of Honor and the Order of the British Empire.

== Life ==
Marie Briand was born on March 22, 1870, in the hamlet of La Hautière in the municipality of La Prénessaye, in the Côtes-d´Armor. Her father was the coachman of Ernest Carré-Kerisouet, master of the Forges du Vaublanc, in Plémet. In 1877, the Briand family moved to Vaublanc in Plémet. Her father left service in 1881 at the age of 55 and the family left Plémet to settle in St-Brieuc.

In the summer of 1890, a few months after the death of her father, Marie Briand met two sisters who were members of the Third Order of Mary (the future congregation of the Missionary Sisters of the Society of Mary). Shortly afterwards she entered the novitiate of these sisters in St-Brieuc which was then transferred to Sainte-Foy-lès-Lyons in 1891. Marie Briand took her vows on January 15, 1893, under the name of Sister Mary Agnes. Two weeks later, she embarked in Marseille for Sydney. She stayed there for a year to learn English, and in 1894 she joined the Waikiri Mission on Taveuni Island. She was in charge of the girls' school for 22 years but also served occasionally as a nurse.

In 1908 she was appointed Regional Mother Superior for all the Marist Sisters of Fiji. In 1911 a small leper colony was established on the island of Makogai. It started out with 2 nuns and 40 patients. This figure had risen to 100 patients by 1916 when the colonial government of the Fiji Islands appointed Mother Mary Agnes as the director of the facility. Under the governance of Mother Mary Agnes the leper colony became one of the largest in the world, counting more than 400 patients in 1925 and 700 in 1950 when the Mother Superior retired. It welcomed lepers from other British colonies in the Pacific as well as those from New Zealand and its dependencies from 1922.

The Makogai leper colony was cited as a model of efficiency and the governance of Mother Mary Agnes always described as a fair balance between compassion and discipline, which earned Mother Mary Agnes the nickname “General in skirts”. Mother Mary Agnes organized the leper colony of Makogai based on the Indian model of agricultural leprosarium centered on occupational therapy. Makogai patients who were not hospitalized lived in 13 villages organized by ethnicity. They had to garden, fish, graze livestock, do crafts work, and participate in sports and recreational activities. The leper colony was governed by its own code of conduct and its own disciplinary sanctions up to and including prison. In recognition of her model governance, Mother Mary Agnes was received a Member of the Order of the British Empire in 1937, with personal award from Queen Mary. The segregationist organization of Makogai was hailed for its results in terms of social peace and for the freedom granted to each community to keep its traditions and religious practices. It was also criticized, particularly with regard to the unfair distribution of rations. The racial hierarchy was enforced by the colonial government of Fiji, which billed governments sending patients different rates depending on the race of the leper : higher lodging fees for whites, lower for Chinese, Indians and Maori, and even lower for native Pacific islanders.

In 1939, Mother Mary Agnes embarked on a 8 months long journey. She went to France, to the General Chapter of the Order of Missionary Sisters of the Society of Mary, which had become an order of pontifical right 7 years earlier. She also traveled to the United States and Jamaica where she helped improve the management of the leper colony of Spanish Town.

Mother Mary Agnes was involved in the fundraising campaigns which led to the creation in 1939 of the Makogai Lepers Trust Board, which became the Pacific Leprosy Foundationhttps://www.leprosy.org.nz.

In 1950, Mother Mary Agnes retired from the management of Makogai but remained on the island until her death in 1955. She was buried, at her request, in the patients' cemetery. She had received the Legion of Honour from the French government in 1952 in recognition of her 34 years of service to lepers.

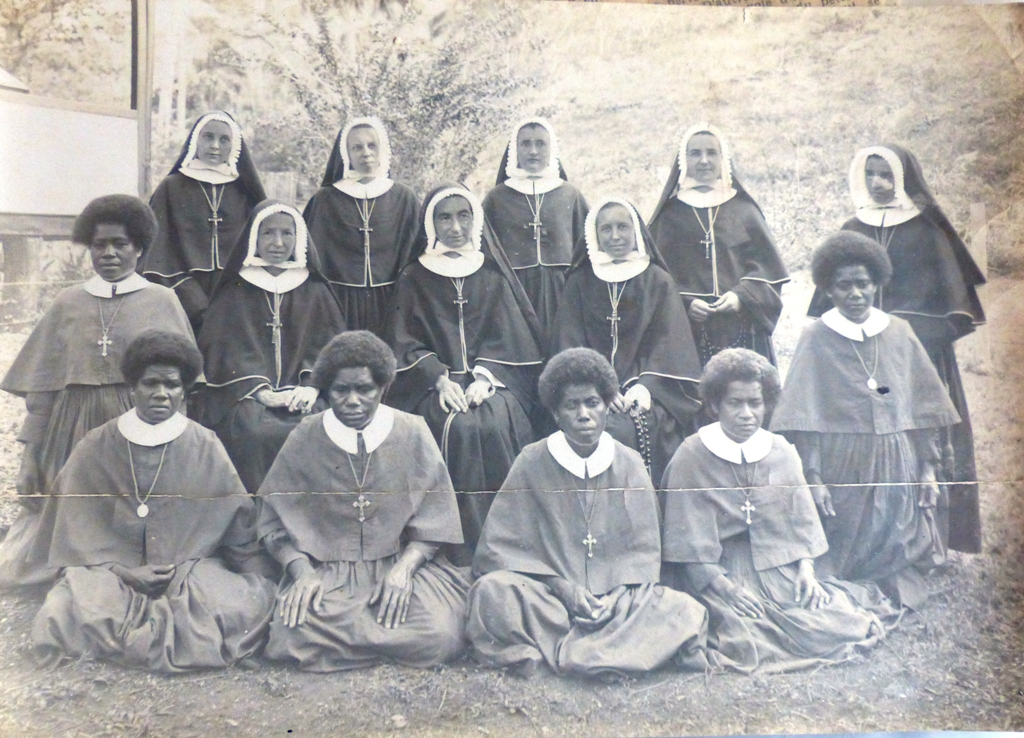
Mother Agnes with the missionary and diocesan sisters of Makogai

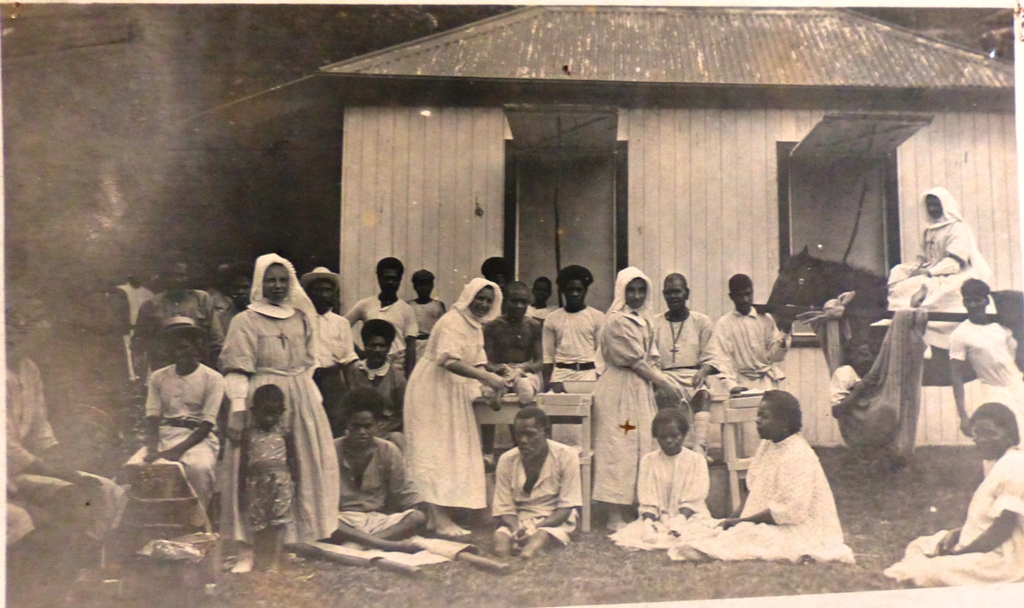
Mother Agnes with missionary sisters and their leper patients in Makogai

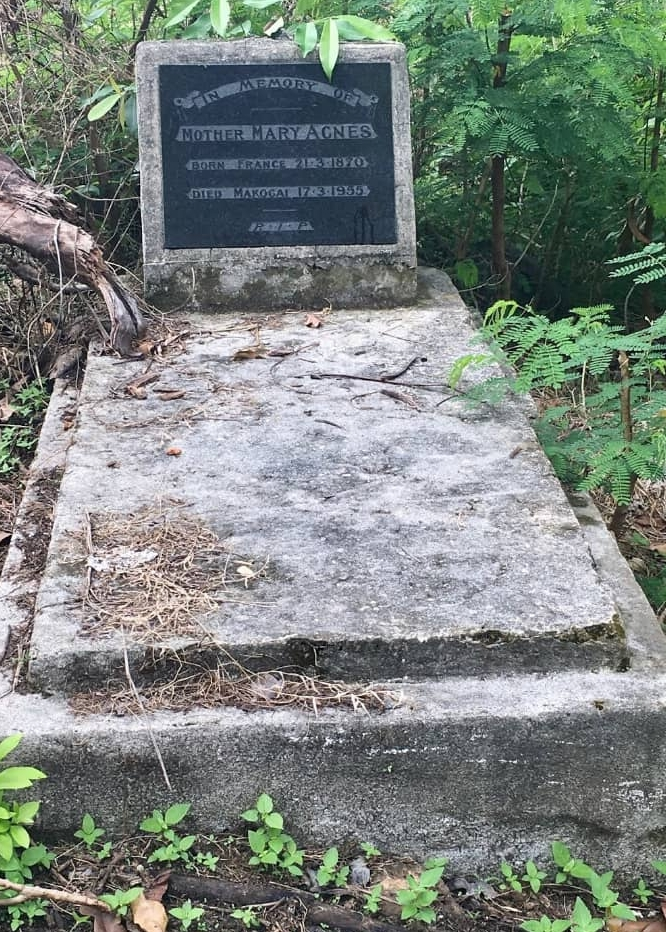
Grave of Mother Agnes in the cemetery of Makogai
