= Mary Magdalena Lewis Tate =

African American evangelist

Mary Magdalena Street Lewis Tate
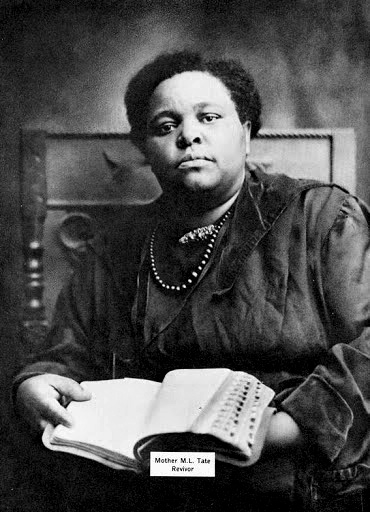
- Tate in 1923
- Born: Mary Lena Street; January 5, 1871; Vanleer, Tennessee
- Died: December 28, 1930 (aged 59); Philadelphia, Pennsylvania
- Occupation: Evangelist
- Known for: The Church of the Living God, the Pillar and Ground of the Truth

Mary Magdalena Street Lewis Tate ("Mother Tate") (January 3, 1871 – December 28, 1930) was an African American evangelist. She was the first American woman to serve as a Bishop in a nationally recognized denomination. She founded a Pentecostal denomination, The Church of the Living God, the Pillar and Ground of the Truth, in 1903. Its first convocation was held in June 1903 in Greenville, Alabama. The church was the first Pentecostal Holiness church in America founded by a woman, and spread to at least twenty states. At least seven denominations currently trace their history back to her church.

== Early life and education ==
Mary Lena Street was born in Vanleer, Tennessee, on January 5, 1871. She was one of four sisters born to Belfield Street and Nancy (Hall) Street, and part of a larger extended family of nine children, including five half-brothers and half-sisters.

In 1889, at age nineteen, Mary Street married her first husband, David Lewis. They had two sons, Walter Curtis Lewis and Felix Early Lewis. In 1914, she married Robert Tate, a deacon in the church, but they later divorced. She is reported to have married and divorced a third time as well.

Mary Lena Tate

Robert Tate

Mary Lena Tate (center front) with grandson Felix Early Lewis, III (left), ca1925

== Church of the Living God ==
Mary Lewis began traveling and preaching in Steel Springs, Tennessee, and Paducah, Kentucky. She was known as Saint Mary Magdalena. She gathered people into informal "Do Rights" bands in Illinois, Missouri, Kentucky, and Tennessee. She preached to both white and black audiences.

In 1903, Lewis led her followers in creating the Church of the Living God, the Pillar and Ground of the Truth in Greenville, Alabama. The name was taken from I Timothy, 3:15. Following a period of illness, Lewis experienced a miraculous healing and the Pentecostal baptism of the Holy Spirit, speaking in tongues. From June 25 to July 5, 1908, she held a ten-day General Assembly there, a Pentecostal revival at which she formally incorporated the denomination. As the Overseer and Chief Leader of the Church, she presided as bishop, ordained ministers, and baptized converts in the "indwelling" of the Holy Ghost. The church spread rapidly, in response to the work of Lewis and her sons. By 1911, presiding elders were appointed.

In 1914, Street married Robert Tate, a deacon in the church. In June 1914, State Bishops were ordained for four states at the 1914 General Assembly, held in Quitman, Georgia. Two of the bishops were Tate's sons. At the same assembly, the church adopted Tate's first Decree Book, written to summarize the doctrines, rules, rituals and governance of the denomination, for use in its churches. A later edition of 1923 was titled the Constitution, Government, and General Decree Book.

Early church group with Bishops Dora O'Neal and Queen Esther Edwards (in black robes), sisters of Mary Lena Tate at Bowling Green, KY ca1913

Mary Lena Tate 1st seated from left with bishops and elders in Chattanooga TN ca1918

Mary Lena Tate 6th seated from left with early congregation at Chattanooga TN ca1918

Early Saints, church members Mother Garden, Mother Nickerson, Mother Stewart, Mother Nickson (left to right) St. Louis, MO ca1920

By 1916, the group had spread to twenty states. In 1923, its headquarters were moved to Nashville, Tennessee. There Tate established the New and Living Way Publishing Company to print religious literature and music. She is credited with writing many of the hymns used by the denomination.

First Church property with tents used for services at 1915 Heiman Street, Nashville, TN ca1923

Mary Lena Tate house at 1811 Heiman Street, Nashville, TN ca1925

Old Jerusalem Church of the Living God Headquarters 43rd and Aspen Street Philadelphia ca1929

In 1929, Tate identified Bishop Archibald Henry White as her successor in the Church. He was later elected Senior Bishop of all churches in Pennsylvania, incorporated under the name “House of God, Which is the Church of the Living God, Pillar and Ground of the Truth”.

Tate died on December 28, 1930, in Philadelphia General Hospital while on a visit to Philadelphia, Pennsylvania. Her death resulted from frostbite and gangrene in one of her feet, possibly complications of diabetes. Her body was originally buried in a family plot in Dickson, Tennessee, but was moved in 1963 to Greenwood Cemetery in Nashville, Tennessee.

Following Tate's death, three major branches were created under the leadership of various relatives of Mother Tate. These are currently known as the Keith Dominion, the Lewis Dominion, and the Jewell Dominion (previously the McLeod Dominion). At least seven denominations can trace their history back to Tate's establishment of Church of the Living God, the Pillar and Ground of the Truth.

== Teachings ==
Tate was a strong exponent of women's leadership, who intentionally used generic language and mentored women for leadership positions. Hundreds of women served in The Church of the Living God, the Pillar and Ground of the Truth as evangelists, ministers, and bishops.

Tate propounded an approach to living that emphasized "cleanness", as a principle underlying all aspects of life, including food, marriage, family life, and community activity. Her dogma of "The Cleanliness of the Word" was based on St. John 15:3.

== Bibliography ==
- Lewis, Meharry H. (2005). Mary Lena Lewis Tate: Vision! A Biography of the Founder and History of the Church of the Living God, the Pillar and Ground of the Truth, Inc. Nashville, Tennessee: The New and Living Way Publishing Company.
- Lewis, Meharry H., ed. (2003). Mary Lena Lewis Tate: Collected Letters and Manuscripts. Nashville: The New and Living Way.
