= Mary Elizabeth Bayer =

Mary Elizabeth Bayer

Mary Elizabeth Bayer (February 10, 1925 - September 7, 2005) was a Canadian civil servant, educator and community activist. Bayer was Manitoba's first woman Assistant Deputy Minister.

The daughter of Anne Farquharson Patteson and Granville Lovejoy Bayer, she was born in Edmonton, Alberta and grew up in Manitoba. Bayer graduated from Kelvin High School in Winnipeg in 1943. Bayer was the great-granddaughter of Edward Hay. She pioneered adult daytime television programming at the CBC. Bayer served as executive director of the Volunteer Bureau, the Manitoba Centennial Corporation and the Manitoba Arts Council. She was first president of Heritage Winnipeg and also served as president of Heritage Canada. She was a member of the Confederation Centre of the Arts in Charlottetown and the Canadian commission for UNESCO. She also served on the national executive for the Girl Guides of Canada. She was Assistant Deputy Minister in Manitoba for Culture & Heritage.

Bayer retired to Victoria in 1980. She was chair of the Greater Victoria Library Board and of the British Columbia Heritage Society. She also served on the executive of the Provincial Capital Commission. In 1994, she was named a member of the Order of Canada. She died on September 7, 2005 in Victoria. She was recognized for Lifetime Achievement by the YWCA Women of Distinction program.

Bayer also published a number of collections of poetry, including Faces of Love. Her text was used in the opera Grant, Warden of the Plains by Murray Adaskin.
