= Mary and Martha Society =

A Mary and Martha Society is a volunteer group associated with various Christian churches, each group being independent of the others. Even when the group appears in a hierarchical organization, for example the Roman Catholic Church, the group is only serving that particular church, not with the larger organization. It is known under different names such as the Society of Mary and Martha, The Daughters (and Sons) of Mary and Martha, Saints Martha and Mary Altar Society, MOMS, and marthas (sic).

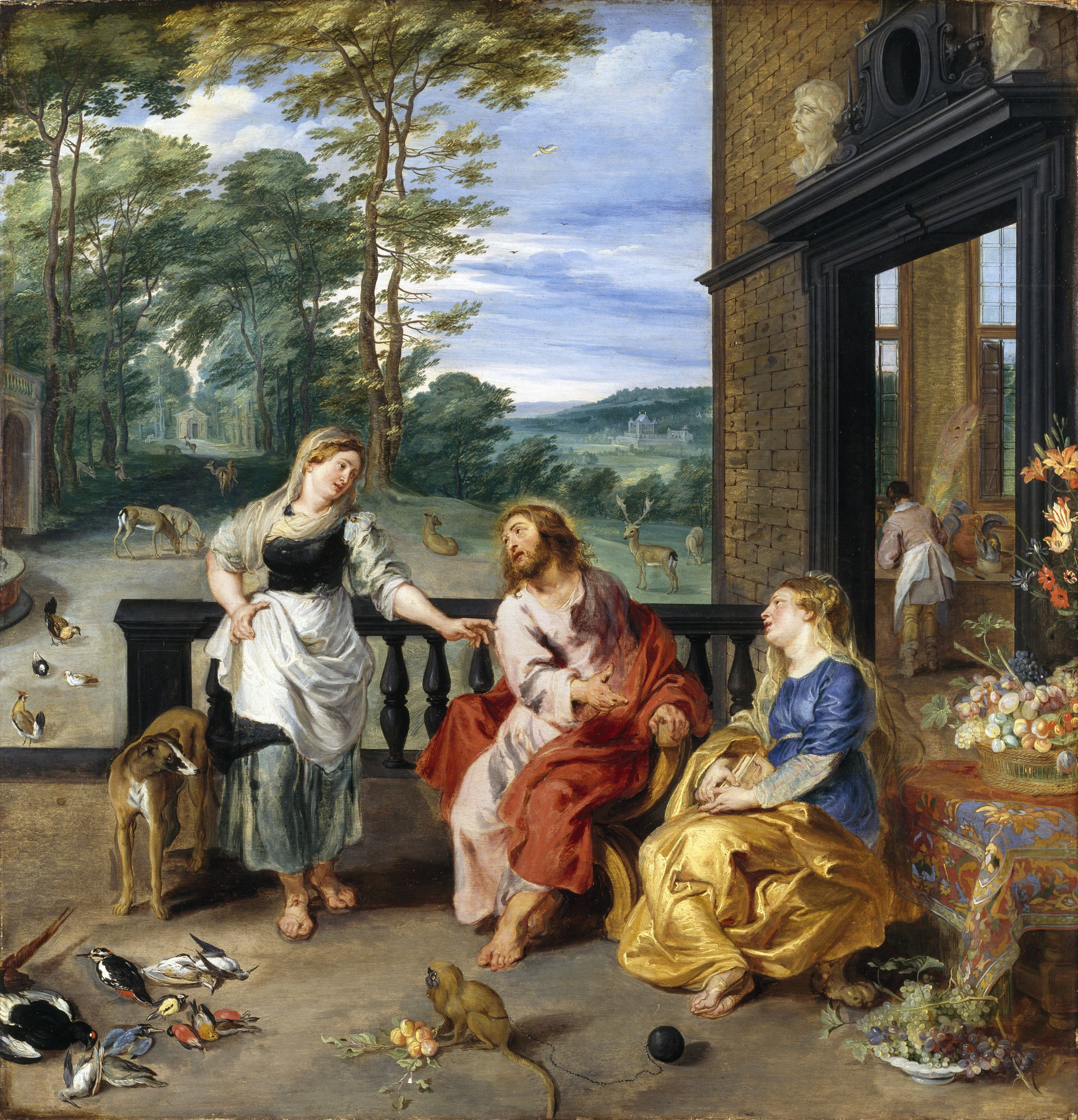
Christ in the House of Martha and Mary, by Jan Breugel the Younger and Peter Paul Rubens

== Biblical references ==
The name comes from the Christian Bible references to Mary of Bethany and Martha. The prevalent reference is Luke 10:39-42. In this passage, Jesus and his followers were invited to Martha’s home for a meal. While Martha busied herself preparing the meal, Mary sat with Christ and the others. Martha was agitated because Mary was not helping prepare the meal. She asked Christ if He did not care. Christ gently reminded her that the meal was not the important task, but the hearing of His Word was the "one thing needful." Mary and Martha also appear in the gospel of John 11:1-44 and John 12:2-8.

== Service ==
The society provides various services. As a Martha the society provides, relief to the poor, hospitality after service, creation of orphanages, provide for missionary services, schools, hospitals, burial for indigents, fund raising, cookbook writing and sales, and maintenance of church buildings. As a Mary the society provides, Christian education and personal spiritual growth. One member explains in her letter on behalf of Brook Highland Community Church,"… we chose the name "Mary and Martha Society" because we felt that it identified us with both internal and external service projects, which was our primary mission." The constitution for the Mary and Martha Society of SS. Peter and Paul Church of Waterloo, Illinois states that their primary interest is their bond of friendship between the ladies of the congregation and the financial assistance of the parochial school.

== Chronology ==
The earliest mention of the society is in 1836 where the Roman Catholic Sisters of Charity took control of the Society in four churches of Saint Peter, Saint Joseph, Saint Aloysius and Saints Peter and Paul. Their records indicate that the founding of the Society goes back to 1836 with the Sisters of Santa Maria. In 1877, Saint Mary’s African Methodist Episcopal "AME" church notes that North Carolina Negroes were members of the society. In 1880, The Sons and Daughters of Mary and Martha were prevalent in Upson County, Georgia. References in obituaries and burial markers shows the society spread from North Carolina to Canada from 1845 to 1972 Internet references note the denominations to be Roman Catholic, Russian Orthodox, Church of Christ, Congregational, AME, Evangelical and Reformed, Christian Reformed, Lutheran, Episcopal, Community and American Baptist.

The Mary and Martha Society continues into the Twenty-first Century with active groups from Bay City Michigan to Albuquerque New Mexico and from Birmingham Alabama to Vancouver Canada.

== Notes ==
The Benedictine Sisters has a large network of volunteer groups named MOMS. Correspondence with a principal author of the materials for the group suggests no relationship with the Mary and Martha Society. Inquiries to the Canadian and English groups provided no further information. The marthas (sic) are named this way as an act of humility after the fashion of E. E. Cummings.
