= Mary Noel =

Mary Noel is a given name. Notable people with the name include:

- Mary Noel Arrowsmith (1890–1965), American educator
- Mary Noel Menezes (1930–2022), Guyanese Roman Catholic nun and historian
- Mary Noel Streatfeild (1895–1986), English author
