= Mary of Jesus =

Mary of Jesus may refer to:

- Mary (mother of Jesus), Mary of Nazareth, the mother of Jesus
- Saint Marie-Eugénie de Jésus (1817–1898), founder of the congregation of the Religious of the Assumption
- Venerable Mary of Jesus of Ágreda (1602 –1665), Franciscan abbess and spiritual writer
- Blessed María López de Rivas Martínez (1560 – 1640), known as Mary of Jesus, Carmelite nun
- Blessed Émilie d'Oultremont (1818–1878), known as Mother Mary of Jesus, Belgian nun who founded the Sisters of Mary Reparatrix
- Saint Mariam Baouardy (1846 –1878), known as Mary of Jesus Crucified, Carmelite nun and mystic
- Mary of Jesus de León y Delgado (1643 –1741), Spanish Dominican lay sister
- Antoinette Fage (1824–1883), known as Marie of Jesus, co-founder of the Little Sisters of the Assumption
- Blessed Bernard Mary of Jesus (1831–1911), Italian priest
- Blessed Franciszka Siedliska (1842 –1902), known as Mother Mary of Jesus the Good Shepherd, founder of the Sisters of the Holy Family of Nazareth
