= Mary Esther =

Mary Esther may refer to the following:

== Places ==
- Mary Esther, Florida

== People ==
- Mary Esther Gaulden Jagger (1921–2007), American radiation geneticist and political activist
- Mary Esther Harding (1888–1971), British-American Jungian analyst
- Mary Esther Kropp Dakubu (1938–2016), American linguist based in Ghana
- Mary Esther MacGregor (1872–1961), Canadian author also known as Marian Keith
- Mary Esther Trueblood (1872–1939), American mathematician and sociologist
- Mary Esther Wells (1943–1992), American singer
- Mary Esther Were, Kenyan beauty pageant titleholder
