= Mary Julia =

Disambiguation name page

Mary Julia is a feminine given name. Notable people with the name include:

- Mary Julia Baldwin (1829–1897), American educator
- Mary Julia Wade (1928–2005), Australian palaeontologist
- Mary Julia Young (fl. 1775–1810), English novelist, poet, translator, and biographer
