= Mary Eugenia =

Mary Eugenia may refer to:

- Mary Eugenia Benson Jobson (1872–1962), American suffragist and activist
- Mary Eugenia Charles (1919–2005), Dominican politician
- Mary Eugenia Ghann (?–1993), Ghanaian politician
- Mary Eugenia Kapp (1909–1983), American chemist
