= Mary Grace (disambiguation) =

Mary Grace (?–1799/1800) was a British self-taught professional portrait painter and copyist.

Mary Grace may also refer to:

- Mary Gonzaga Grace (1812–1897), American religious sister and nurse
- Mary Grace Baloyo (1973–2001), Filipino military aviator
- Mary Grace Borel (1915–1998), American socialite and film actress
- Mary Grace Canfield (1924–2014), American theatre-, film-, and television actress
- Mary Grace Kovar (1929–2015), American statistician
- Mary Grace Natividad Sonora Poe, full name of Grace Poe (born 1968), Filipino politician, businesswoman, educator, and philanthropist
- Mary Grace O'Brien (born 1958), American judge
- Mary Grace Quackenbos (1869–1948), American lawyer
- HMS Mary Grace, three ships of the Royal Navy
