= Mary Martha =

Mary Martha may refer to:

- Mary Martha Byrne (born 1969), American actress, singer, and television writer
- Mary Martha Good (born 1954), American politician
- Mary Martha Pearson (1798–1871), English portrait painter
- Mary Martha Presley Merritt (?–1994), American politician and civic leader
- Mary Martha Reid (1812–1894), American nurse during the American Civil War
- Mary Martha Sherwood (1775–1851), English children's writer

== See also ==
- Mary and Martha (disambiguation)
