= Mary Jeanne =

Disambiguation name page

Mary Jeanne is a feminine given name. Notable people with the name include:

- Mary Jeanne Coyne (1926–1998), American judge
- Mary Jeanne Hallstrom (1924–2006), American nurse and politician
- Mary Jeanne Kreek (1937–2021), American neurobiologist
- Mary Jeanne van Appledorn (1927–2014), American composer and pianist

== See also ==
- Mary Jean
