= Mary Isabel =

Mary Isabel may refer to:

- Mary Isabel Fraser (1863–1942), New Zealand teacher, school principal and educationalist
- Mary Isabel Leslie (1899–1978), Irish nationalist and writer
- Mary Isabel McCracken (1866–1955), American entomologist, researcher and teacher

== See also ==
- Mary Isabella (disambiguation)
