= Mary Jean Simpson =

Mary Jean Simpson (July 18, 1888 – November 29, 1977) was the first woman to be appointed a position as bill clerk in the Office of the Secretary of the United States Senate and she was the Dean of Women at the University of Vermont. She was an accomplished scholar and a public servant.

== Childhood ==
Mary Jean Simpson, the daughter of George Simpson, was born in East Craftsbury, Vermont on July 18, 1888. She was brought up in the East Craftsbury Presbyterian Church. Simpson graduated from St. Johnsbury Academy in 1908. After she graduated she went to Wheaton Seminary because she did not have enough credits to go to her top choice, Mt. Holyoke. When she got to Wheaton Seminary there was a scarlet fever epidemic where she was quarantined. Once she got out of quarantine she was asked to take over grades 5-9 at the Village School for the Spring Term. She took the job even though she had never taught before. Simpson said she had never felt so rich because she got paid $7.00 a week for teaching at the Village School. Later on she went back to St. Johnsbury Academy to get the credits for Mt. Holyoke. During this time, her father got sick, so she went to the University of Vermont instead of Mt. Holyoke to be closer to home. She majored in Latin and graduated in 1913 as a Phi Beta Kappa. After graduating Simpson got multiple jobs teaching. She started at Peoples Academy for three years, then for two years she went to Montpelier High School, and then during World War I she went back as the principle to Peoples Academy.

== Career ==
=== Work in the United States Senate ===
In 1924, Mary Jean Simpson was elected for Town Representative. She was the first woman to be elected from Orleans County. In 1925, she was appointed by Senator Dale to be bill clerk of the United States Senate in Washington. She served under Presidents Calvin Coolidge and Herbert Hoover. While she worked there she had a big roll-top desk that overlooked the Capital. She kept a record of each bill in a big record book. In this ledger, she recorded the course of each bill up to the bill's signature or veto by the president. In 1933, during the Great Depression, Franklin D. Roosevelt became president, and Simpson lost her position. However, during the Depression she was appointed to the Women’s Division of the Civil Works Administration and later traveled through the United States as Director of Women’s Production Projects for the Works Progress Administration.

=== Dean of Women at University of Vermont ===
Mary Jean Simpson became the Dean of Women at the University of Vermont (UVM) in 1937. While there, she recruited students for the school's first nursing program and established a scholarship program for returning veterans. Simpson wrote letters to the parents of the daughters who were entering the university. These letters showed the high standards she had set for women students at UVM. The letters said women "should not let her work pile up, nor sacrifice regular study hours to pleasant social demands, nor give more time than she can afford to ‘dates,’ sports, or other extra-curricular activities." Thirteen years after becoming the Dean of Women at the University of Vermont, a women’s dormitory was named Simpson Hall in her honor. She retired as Dean of Women in 1954. The university presents the Mary Jean Simpson Award to a female student every year at graduation. The award goes to a woman who best exemplifies Mary Jean Simpsons character, leadership and scholarship.

== Retirement ==
When Simpson retired in 1954, she got involved in new responsibilities including the Vermont Board of Managers of the National Council of Church Women, the Vermont Council on Adult Education, Secretary of the Board of Trustees of Vermont Colleges, Chairman of the State Commission on Alcohol Education, Steering Committee Chairman of the Vermont legislative Council and the Citizens Advisory Committee to National Prohibition and Parole Survey. She also worked to promote the Japan International Christian University.

== Death ==
Mary Jean Simpson died in 1977 at the age of 89 in East Craftsbury, Vermont. She was an accomplished scholar and a public servant.
