= Mary Catherine =

Mary Catherine, Mary Katharine, or Mary Katherine may refer to:

== Mary Catherine ==
- Mary Catherine Bateson (1939–2021), American writer and cultural anthropologist
- Mary Catherine Bolton (1790/1791–1830), English actress
- Mary Catherine Bruton (1862–1937), Australian Roman Catholic nun, educator, and hospital administrator
- Mary Catherine Cuff (born 1947), American former Supreme Court justice
- Mary-Catherine Deibel (?–2023), American restaurant owner
- Mary Catherine Ferguson (1823–1905), Irish author and biographer
- Mary Catherine Garrison (born 1973), American actress
- Mary Catherine Judd (1852–1937), American educator, author of children's literature, and peace activist
- Mary Catherine Lamb (1949–2009), American textile artist
- Mary Catherine Loreto (?–1983), one of the Cassandra Martyrs of Charity
- Mary Catherine Nivert, birth name of Taffy Nivert (born 1944), American songwriter and singer
- Mary Catherine Phee (born 1963), American diplomat
- Mary Catherine Rowsell (1839–1921), English novelist, author of children's fiction, and dramatist

== Mary Katharine ==
- Mary Katharine Brandegee (1844–1920), American botanist
- Mary Katharine Goddard (1738–1816), American postmaster, publisher, and book seller
- Mary Katharine Ham (born 1980), American journalist

== Mary Katherine ==
- Mary Katherine Fechtel, American beauty pageant titleholder
- Mary Katherine Horony Cummings, real name of Big Nose Kate (1849–1940), Hungarian-born American outlaw, gambler, prostitute, and common-law wife of Doc Holliday
- Mary Katherine Linaker, birth name of Kay Linaker (1913–2008), American actress and screenwriter
- Mary Katherine Loyacano McCravey (1910–2009), American landscape- and still life painter

== Fictional characters ==
- Mary Katherine Blackwood, in Shirley Jackson's 1962 novel, We Have Always Lived in the Castle
- Mary Katherine Gallagher, in the US TV show Saturday Night Live, played by Molly Shannon
