= Mary Margaret =

Feminine given name

Mary Margaret is a feminine given name. Notable people with the name include:

- Mary Margaret Busk (1779–1863), English writer and translator
- Mary Margaret Conway, American political scientist
- Mary Margaret Francis (1924–2000), British author
- Mary Margaret Funk, American writer and advocate of inter-religious dialogue
- Mary Margaret Haugen (born 1941), American politician
- Mary Margaret Heaton (1836–1883), English art historian
- Mary-Margaret Humes (born 1954), American actress and beauty pageant titleholder
- Mary Margaret Kaye (1908–2004), British writer
- Mary Margaret McBride (1899–1976), American radio interview host and writer
- Mary Margaret McCabe (born 1948), English emerita professor of ancient philosophy
- Mary Margaret McKeown (born 1951), American circuit judge
- Mary-Margaret McMahon (born 1966), Canadian politician
- Mary Margaret Milner, birth name of Margaret Richardson (lawyer) (1943–2021), American tax lawyer
- Mary Margaret Oliver (born 1948), American politician
- Mary Margaret O'Hara (born late 1950s), Canadian singer-songwriter, actress, and composer
- Mary Margaret O'Reilly (1865–1949), American civil servant
- Mary Margaret Truman (1924–2008), American classical soprano, actress, journalist, radio- and television personality, writer, and socialite; only child of Harry S. Truman
- Mary Margaret Whipple (born 1940), American former politician
