= Mary Sophia =

Mary Sophia may refer to:

- Mary Sophia Allen (1878–1964), British political activist
- Mary Sophia Alston (c. 1856–1932), Australian philanthropist
- Mary Sophia Bentham (c. 1765–1858), British botanist and author
- Mary Sophia Gray, alternate name of Sophia Hinerangi (c. 1834–1911), New Zealand tourist guide and temperance leader
- Mary Sophia Hyde Rice (1816–1911), American missionary and educator
- Mary Sophia Money (d. 1905), English victim of an unsolved murder
