= Mary Isabella =

Mary Isabella may refer to:

- Mary Isabella Hales Horne (1818–1905), English-born American Mormon leader
- Mary Isabella Langrishe (1864–1939), Irish tennis player
- Mary Isabella Lee (1871–1939), New Zealand servant, dressmaker, coalminer, and homemaker
- Mary Isabella Macleod (1852–1933), Canadian pioneer
- Mary Isabella Shields, birth name of Mamie Shields Pyle (1866–1949), American women's suffrage leader
- Mary Isabella Taylor, birth name of Peta Taylor (1912–1989), English cricketer
- Mary Isabella Wickenhauser (1910–1995), American actress

== See also ==
- Mary Isabel (disambiguation)
