= Mary Edith =

Mary Edith may refer to:

- Mary Edith Campbell (1875/1876–1962), American suffragist and social economist
- Mary Edith Durham (1863–1944), British artist, anthropologist, and writer
- Mary Edith Nepean (1876–1960), Welsh writer
- Mary Edith Pechey (1845–1908), English medical doctor and suffragist
- Mary Edith Rymill, Australian wife of John Rymill
