= Mary Augusta =

Disambiguation name page

Mary Augusta may refer to:

- Mary Augusta Hickey (1887–1923), American wife of P. J. Kennedy
- Mary Augusta Mullikin (1874–1964), American painter
- Mary Augusta Safford (1851–1927), American Unitarian minister
- Mary Augusta Stewart Houston, birth name of Stewart Bagnani (1903–1996), Canadian administrator
- Mary Augusta Tappage (1888–1978), Shuswap-Métis elder, midwife, and storyteller
- Mary Augusta Wakefield (1853–1910), British composer, contralto, festival organiser, and writer
- Mary Augusta Yohé (1866–1938), American musical theatre actress
