= Mary Abigail =

Disambiguation name page

Mary Abigail may refer to:

- Mary Abigail Dodge (1833–1896), American writer and essayist
- Mary Abigail Fillmore (1832–1854), American daughter of President Millard Fillmore and Abigail Powers
- Mary Abigail Wambach (born 1980), American retired soccer player, coach, and member of the National Soccer Hall of Fame
