= Mary Ellen =

Mary Ellen is a given name. Notable people with the name include:

- Mary Ellen Duncan (1941–2022), American academic administrator and teacher
- Mary Ellen Flynn (1932–2021), American politician
- Mary Ellen Mark (1940–2015), American photographer
- Mary Ellen Pleasant (1815–1904), American entrepreneur, financier, real estate magnate, and abolitionist
- Mary Ellen Powers, birth name of Mala Powers (1931–2007), American actress
- Mary Ellen Swan (1892–2004), Canadian supercentenarian
- Mary Ellen Turpel-Lafond (born 1963), Canadian lawyer, former judge, and legislative advocate for children's rights
- Mary Ellen Wilson (1864–1956), American child abuse victim
