= Mary Eleanor (disambiguation) =

Mary Eleanor may refer to:

- Mary Eleanor Bowes (1749–1800), English noble
- Mary Eleanor Brackenridge (1837–1924), American businesswoman, feminist, suffragist, and temperance activist
- Mary Eleanor Darwin (1842–1842), English daughter of Charles Darwin
- Mary Eleanor Donahue, birth name of Elinor Donahue (born 1937), American author and retired actress
- Mary Eleanor Fortescue-Brickdale (1872–1945), English artist
- Mary Eleanor Noble (1845–1925), English politician and parish historian
- Mary Eleanor Power (born 1949), American ecologist and professor of biology
- Mary Eleanor Spear (1897–1986), American data visualization specialist, graphic analyst, and author
- Mary Eleanor Wheeler, birth name of Mary Pearcey (1866–1890), English woman executed for murder
- Mary Eleanor Wilkins Freeman (1852–1930), American author
