= Mary Helen McPhillips =

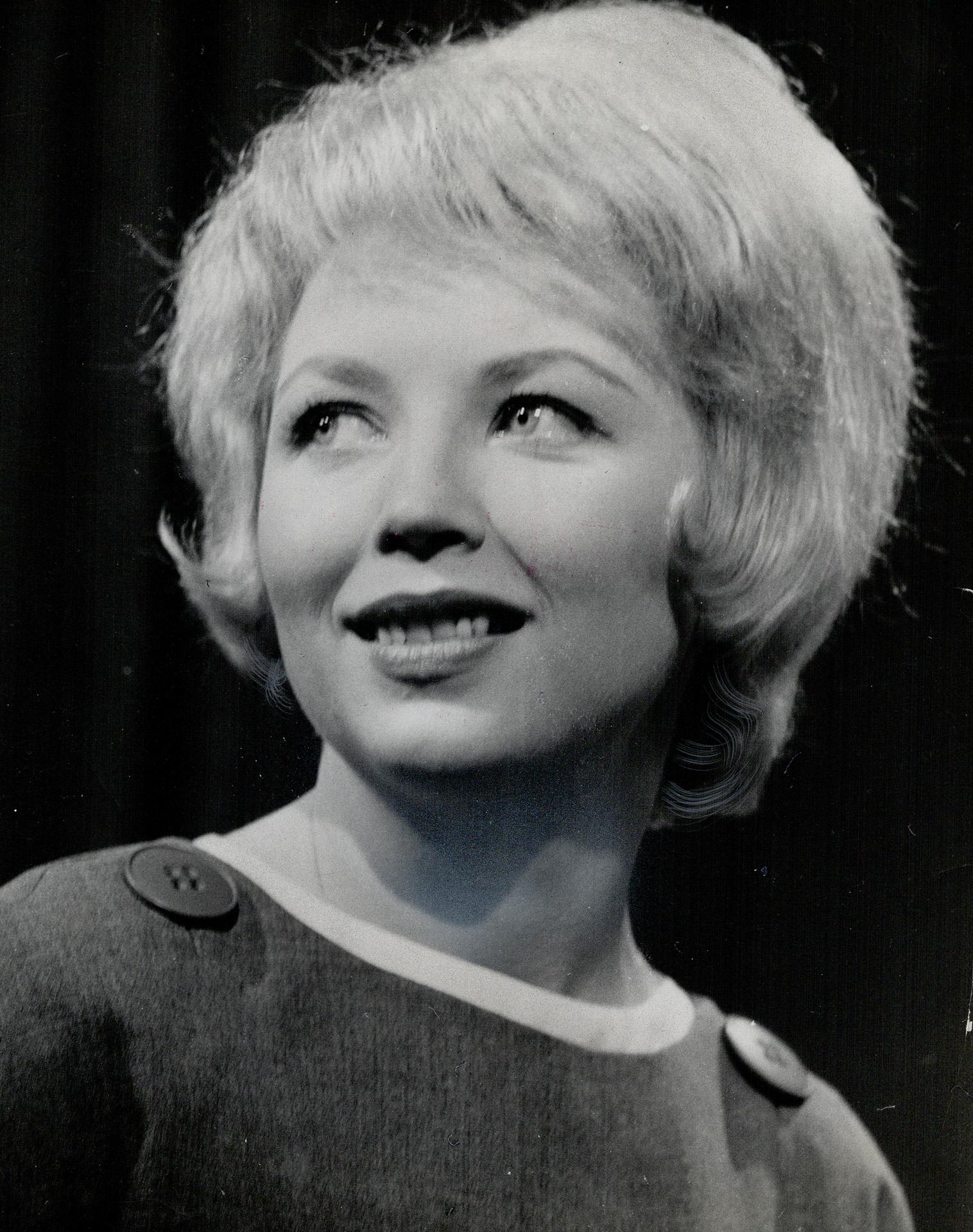
- McPhillips in 1961
- Born: Mary Helen Sweeney; 1931
- Died: December 16, 1998 (aged 67); New York City, New York, U.S.
- Occupations: Public-affairs host, News Anchor women
- Children: Michele McPhillips-Abadi - son in law Nidal Abadi & step son, Christopher Snowden,
- Relatives: Terrance Sweeney, Dr.John Sweeney (1934-2011 )(brothers)
- Writing career
- Notable awards: nominated for 1973-1974 NEW YORK area award

Mary Helen McPhillips (1931–1998), was a noted television personality.

== TV and radio career ==
McPhillips worked for CBC and CHUM radio in Canada. She moved to New York to work for WOR-TV and radio. She spent 20 years at the company. She appeared on Straight Talk as a public-affairs host in the 1970s and 1980s, The Martha Deane program, News at Noon as news anchor in the 1960s. She also appeared on the Mutual Broadcasting Network and on The John Gambling morning radio program.

== Death ==
She died from heart failure on December 16, 1998, aged 67 in New York.

== Nominations ==
nominated for 1973-1974 NEW YORK area award
