= Mary Ethel Williams Barrett =

American art museum director

Mary Ethel Williams Barrett (1913–1951) was an artist, an art teacher, and the first director of the Wilmington Museum of Art. She served as director until 1940.

Mary "Ethel" Williams was “educated in Wilmington Schools, Duke University, and at Harvard University. She served as an assistant in the Department of Fine Arts at Duke from 1931 to 1937.”

== Museum career ==
Williams was inspired to try to get a Works Progress Administration (WPA) sponsored art space in Wilmington when she was taking a class at Harvard University. In December 1937, Williams met with federal WPA officials in Washington DC, then headed home to Wilmington, and talked with Elisabeth Chant, the woman who was almost singlehandedly responsible for nurturing artistic talent in Wilmington before World War II. After Chant blessed the project, Williams and her supporters garnered financial aid from the city, and the Wilmington Museum of Art came into existence in November 1938. While Ethel Williams was at the helm, the museum was a great success. In less than two years, the museum's space and programs had been attended by 52,427.

In July 1940, Mary Ethel Williams married George Warren Barrett and—as was typical for the time for a women—left her job with the museum.

== Family life ==
Mary Ethel Williams Barrett and her spouse had three children. She died in 1951.
