= Alie Israel =

American track and field athlete

Personal information
- Nickname: Muffy Israel
- Born: Almoug Israel; May 23, 1983 (age 43) Chicago, Illinois, US
- Height: 172.72 cm (5 ft 8.00 in)
- Weight: 65.7 kg (145 lb)

Sport
- Sport: Running
- Event: 100m dash
- College team: Carthage College

Alie "Muffy" Israel, is an American track runner who in college ran as Muffy Israel.

== Collegiate career ==
One of Carthage Colleges most notable alumni and decorated athletes:

Israel experienced a successful career as a Carthage College Lady Red. While at Carthage, she earned NCAA All-America citations in 17 events over her four-year career. As a freshman in 2002, she won the NCAA Division III national title in the outdoor 100-meter dash, while finishing fifth in the 200-meter dash, seventh as part of a 400-meter relay team, fifth in the indoor 55-meter dash and fourth on the indoor 1,600-meter relay team.

In 2003, she was third in the 100-meter dash, eighth in the 200-meter dash, a member of a national-championship 400-meter relay team, fourth in the indoor 55-meter dash and fifth as a member of the indoor 1,600-meter relay team. In 2004, Israel was the national runner-up in the 100-meter dash while finishing fifth in the 200-meter dash, seventh as part of a 400-meter relay team and second in the indoor 55-meter dash.

As a senior in 2005, she finished fifth in the 100-meter dash, second as a member of the 400-meter relay team and fifth in the indoor 55-meter dash. Israel also won 16 individual CCIW titles, including four-straight titles in the outdoor 100-meter dash, four-straight titles in the outdoor 200-meter dash, four titles in the indoor 55-meter dash and three indoor titles in the 200-meter dash. She was named the “most valuable performer” at the 2005 CCIW Indoor Track and Field Championship.

Alie "Muffy" Israel was inducted into Carthage College's Athletic Hall of Fame in 2011

== Professional career ==
Personal Best: 100M - 11.32/11.43 200M - 23.40 60M - 7.36

After taking more than two years off from competing seriously, Alie Israel qualified for the 2008 Indoor USA Championships and tied her personal best in the 100m and set a new personal record in the 200m at the Jim Bush Invitational with marks of 11.71 and 24.19.

In 2009 Israel smashed her indoor personal best by recording 6.94 in the 55m dash and 7.38s in the 60m dash. Israel also qualified and competed in the 2009 USA Indoor Championships taking 8th place in the 60m dash.

During the 2009 Outdoor season Alie continued to improve upon her successful indoor season posting 5prs in the 100m dash ending her season with a new personal best of 11.53s for the 100m dash and 23.72s for the 200m dash.
