= Mary Sue (given name) =

People with the given name Mary Sue include:

- Mary Sue Bello, American 25-year-old murder victim
- Mary Sue McCulloch (1913–1996), American philanthropist, croquet player, and author; granddaughter of John I. Beggs
- Mary Sue Hubbard (1931–2002), the third wife of L. Ron Hubbard 1952–1986
- Mary Sue Kitts (?–1974), American murder victim
- Mary Sue Coleman (born 1943), president of the University of Michigan 2002–2014
- Mary Sue Terry (born 1947), American politician from Virginia
- Mary Sue Milliken (active since 1981), American chef
- Mary Sue Price (active since 1997), American playwright
- Mary Sue, pseudonym of person appearing in Rappin' for Jesus
