= Mary Josephine Benson =

Canadian poet

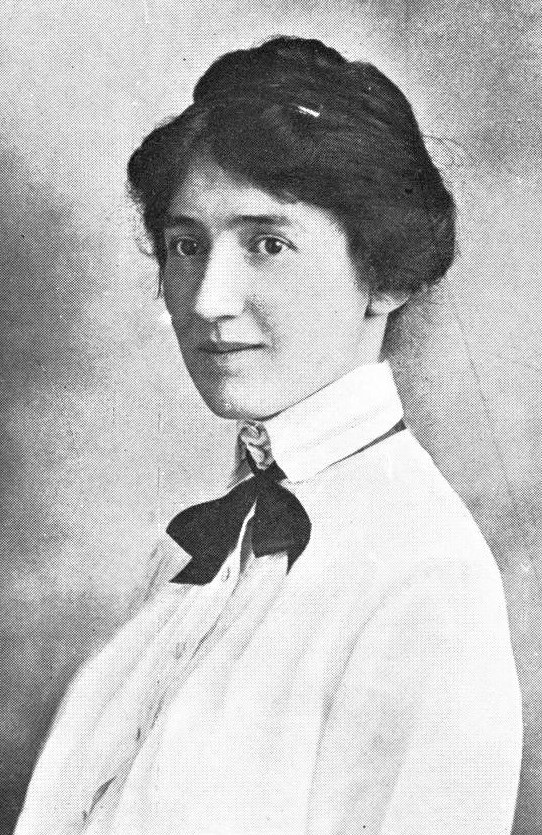
- Benson as she appeared in the anthology Canadian Singers and Their Songs (1919)
- Born: March 20, 1887
- Died: August 31, 1965 (aged 78)
- Occupations: Poet, journalist
- Writing career
- Notable work: My Pocket Beryl (1921)

Signature
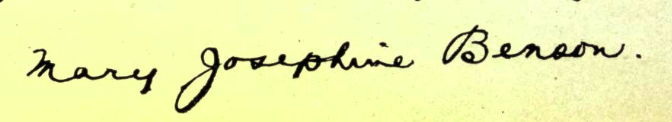

Mary Josephine Benson (born Trotter; March 20, 1887 – August 31, 1965) was a Canadian poet and journalist.

== Life ==
Benson was originally from Port Hope, Ontario. She worked in journalism and advertising in Toronto in the 1910s, and returned to Port Hope following her marriage in 1915.

A report on a reading she gave in 1931 described her voice as "charmingly musical".

== Writing ==
A 1922 review described her only published collection My Pocket Beryl as "real, personal and authentic poetry, of the present era". Among the works collected in My Pocket Beryl is a prose poem about Christmas.

In 1931, she received a $25 (equivalent to $501 in 2025) prize for her poem "The Bitter Lover", awarded "for the best short poem on any subject by a British subject residing in Canada". Andrew Macphail selected her poem as the winner.

In addition to My Pocket Beryl, Benson published individual poems in newspapers and magazines including Maclean's and The Globe (now The Globe and Mail).

== Works ==
- Benson, Mary Josephine (1921). My Pocket Beryl. Toronto: McClelland & Stewart.
- Benson, Mary Josephine (1997). For the Love of Words: The Collected Poems of Mary Josephine Benson. Abbeyfield Publishers. ISBN 0-9680045-3-9. OCLC 36693060.
