= Mary Lynn Realff =

American mechanical engineer (born 1965)

Mary Lynn Realff (born 1965) is an American mechanical engineer and materials scientist specializing in researching the mechanical properties of textiles. She is an associate professor in the School of Materials Science and Engineering at Georgia Tech, and co-director of the Georgia Tech Center for Women, Science, and Technology. Beyond her research on textiles, she is also known for her explorations of group work in engineering education.

== Education and career ==
Realff graduated in 1987 from Georgia Tech, with a bachelor's degree in textile engineering. She earned a Ph.D. from the Massachusetts Institute of Technology in Mechanical Engineering and Polymer Science and Technology in 1992. Mary Lynn Realff became an associate professor at Georgia Tech where she is an instructor for undergraduate and graduate courses regarding textile structures and polymer sciences. She was elected as a Fellow of the American Society of Mechanical Engineers in 2007, at which time she was a program director for Materials Processing and Manufacturing at the National Science Foundation.

== Awards and Honors ==
Throughout Realffs career she has earned many awards she earned the Fellow of the American Society of Mechanical Engineers (ASME) award in 2007.

Mary Lynn received the ANAK award in 2017, the highest honor a faculty member at Georgia Tech can receive.

Most recently in 2024 Realff was awarded with the Ben C. Sparks Medal by the ASME.

== Research/publications ==
=== Publications ===
- Looking Ahead: Fostering Effective Team Dynamics in the Engineering Classroom and Beyond (2021)
- Fatigue Response and Constitutive Behavior Modeling of Poly(ethylene terephthalate) Unreinforced and Nanocomposite Fibers Using Genetic Neural Networks (2012)
- Advanced Fabrics (2003)
- Objective and Subjective Analysis of Knitted Fabric Bagging (2002)
