= Mary Evelyn Rhodes =

British author and historian

Mary Evelyn Rhodes (1925 – 19 February 2018) was a British author and historian, who lived in Hunstanton in the county of Norfolk. She researched and wrote a number of local history books, and is now commemorated by a plaque (Plaque #55609 on Open Plaques) on the wall of the Hunstanton Heritage Centre on Northgate.

== Publications ==
- Hunstanton Born and Bred
- Hunstanton: The First Fifty Years
- A Hunstanton Miscellany
- Hunstanton: The Great Surge of 1953
