= Mary Flynn =

Mary Flynn may refer to:

- Mary Flynn, character in Alias Mary Flynn
- Mary Flynn, character in Merrily We Roll Along (musical)
- Lord Abore and Mary Flynn, a ballad also known as Prince Robert
