= Mary Olivia Nutting =

Author and academic librarian

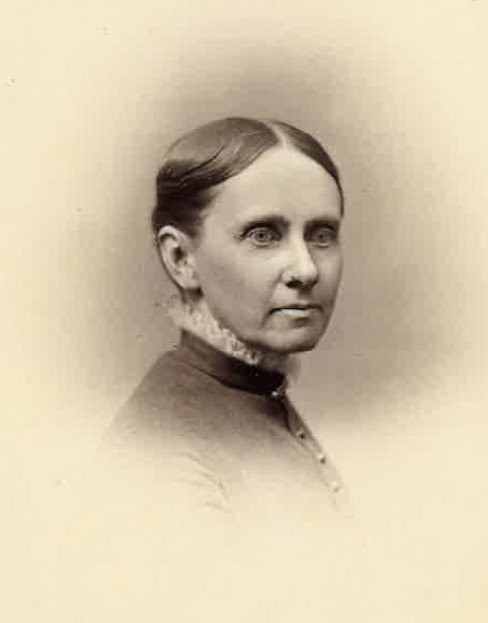
- Photograph of Mary Nutting
- Born: July 1, 1831; Randolph, Vermont
- Died: February 13, 1910 (aged 78); South Hadley, Massachusetts
- Other name: Mary Barrett
- Occupations: academic librarian and author

Mary Olivia Nutting (July 1, 1831 - February 13, 1910) was an author and the first librarian at Mount Holyoke College. She was appointed as Mount Holyoke's librarian in 1870 and worked there until she retired in 1901. She wrote a history of Mount Holyoke which was published in 1876 and also wrote books for young people under the name Mary Barrett.

Nutting graduated from Mount Holyoke Female Seminary in 1852 and worked as a school teacher in Ohio until 1861. She travelled extensively and did historical research in Holland which was the basis for her two books about the Netherland War. A new library was built in 1870 and she was chosen to be its first librarian.

== Bibliography ==
- Steps in the Upward Way, the Story of Fanny Bell (as Mary Barrett, 1866)
- Our Summer at Hillside Farm (as Mary Barrett, 1867)
- The Story of William the Silent and the Netherland War, 1555-1584 (1869)
- Historical Sketch of Mount Holyoke Seminary (1876)
- The Days of Prince Maurice: The Story of the Netherland War from the Death of William the Silent to its Close, 1584-1648 (1894)
