= Mary Josephine Walters =

American painter

Mary Josephine Walters (1837–1883), also known as Josephine Walters or M.J. Walters, was part of the 19th century American landscape painting movement known as the Hudson River School. She studied under Asher Durand and specialized in oil and watercolor painting. Though there is not much information about her life, her paintings exhibited much of the immense detail and precision that her mentor’s work did. Much of Walter's painting was done in the Adirondack and Catskill Mountains, though most of her currently known works are of the Hudson River.

== Biography ==
Mary Josephine Walters learned to paint under the guidance of Asher Durand. Asher Durand’s son, John Durand, wrote briefly about Walters in his father’s biography. He mentions “Miss Josephine Walters, whom he often advised in the pursuit of her studies,” and also remarks that she possibly accompanied Asher Durand on journeys to the Catskills and other regions looking for scenery to paint. The Brooklyn Eagle once reported on her as well, stating, “Miss Walters has attained great excellence in landscape painting. Having been a student with Durand, Miss W. seems to have learned the manipulations of that master, and sketches and paints with delicacy and a good deal of elaboration.”

Mary Josephine Walters managed a studio between 1868 and 1875. Her studio was located in the YMCA Building in New York, while she resided in Brooklyn. Walters moved to Hohokus, New Jersey with her mother by 1880 and, as she never married or had children, was free to explore the wilderness of northern New Jersey and the Catskills at her leisure.

== Notable works ==
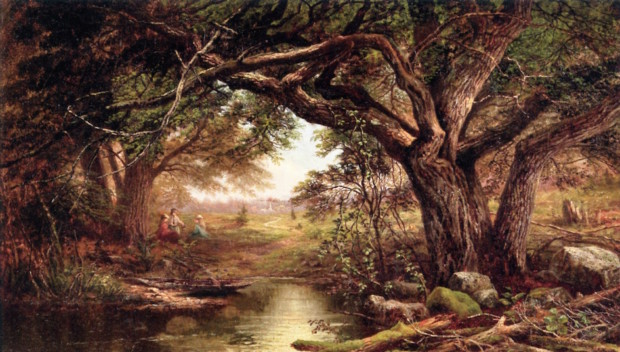
Landscape with Three Ladies Sitting Under a Tree by Mary Josephine Walters

Walters often had exhibitions at the National Academy of Design, the Brooklyn Art Association, and even as far as the San Francisco Art Association between the 1860s and 1880s. She painted mostly forest scenery, and much of her work is done in oil paint and exhibits meticulously painted foliage and great attention to detail. This is likely due to her close study under Asher Durand, whose work also exhibited great detail. Some of her notable works include:

- Study of Ferns
- Autumn River with Punt in the Reeds
- In the Woods
- Landscape with Three Ladies Sitting Under a Tree
- Hudson River Scene
- Forest Interior
