= Navy Yard Urns =

- U.S. National Historic Landmark District – Contributing property
- D.C. Inventory of Historic Sites
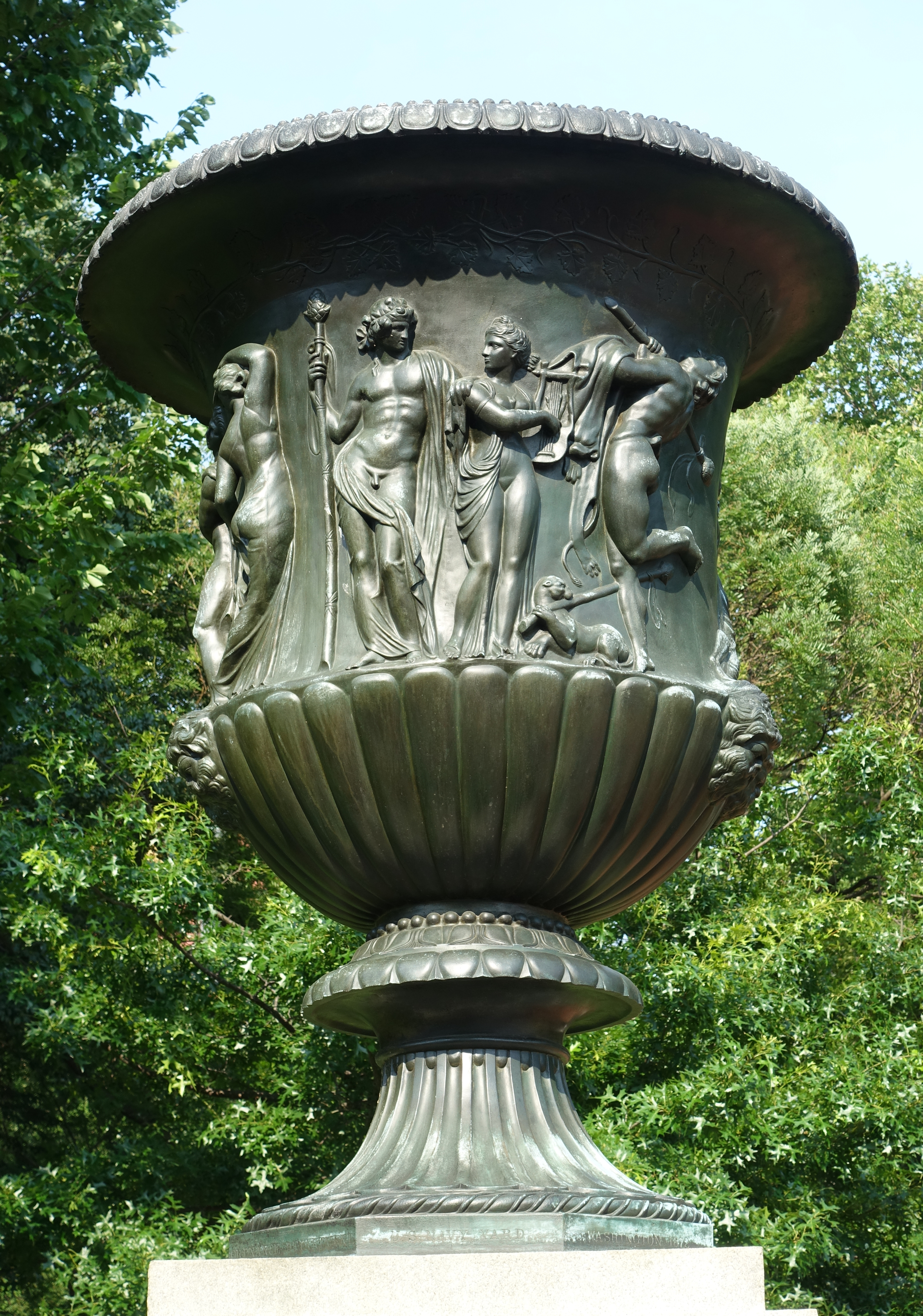
- One of two Navy Yard Urns in 2015
- Location: Lafayette Square, Washington, D.C.
- Coordinates: 38°53′56.93″N 77°2′11.08″W
- Built: 1872
- Architect: Unknown; Washington Navy Yard (founder)
- Part of: Lafayette Square Historic District; L'Enfant Plan
- NRHP reference No.: 70000833 (Lafayette Square Historic District); 97000332 (L'Enfant Plan)

Significant dates
- Added to NRHP: August 29, 1970 (Lafayette Square Historic District); April 24, 1997 (L'Enfant Plan)
- Designated DCIHS: January 19, 1971 (L'Enfant Plan); June 19, 1973 (Lafayette Square Historic District)

The Navy Yard Urns are two decorative bronze urns located in Lafayette Square, a small park across the street from the White House, in Washington, D.C. They were originally planned to be installed in the 1850s, but due to the Civil War and other events, they were not erected until 1872. Secretary of the Navy George M. Robeson had ordered the urns be made at the Washington Navy Yard using melted cannons from the Civil War.

The urns have been moved a few times during their history, most recently in 1969. They originally stood on the east and west side of the equestrian statue of President Andrew Jackson that is the centerpiece of Lafayette Square. The urns are contributing properties to the Lafayette Square Historic District, a National Historic Landmark, and the L'Enfant Plan. Both the district and plan are listed on the National Register of Historic Places and the District of Columbia Inventory of Historic Sites.

== History ==
=== Installation ===
Lafayette Square, a 7-acre (2.8 ha) park on the north side of the White House in Washington, D.C., was originally planned by Pierre Charles L'Enfant in 1791. The square, part of President's Park, was redesigned by Andrew Jackson Downing in 1851–1852. Amongst the changes in Downing's plans were the installation of urns in the square. Due to delays by the Civil War and other events, most of Downing's plans were not carried out until the late-19th century and 20th-century.

The first changes were made in 1853, with the installation of the equestrian statue of President Andrew Jackson. More substantial changes took place from 1872 to 1873, which is the time period when the urns were installed. On the order of Secretary of the Navy George M. Robeson, the Washington Navy Yard melted cannons from the Civil War to create two decorative urns.

They were based on the design of vases brought from Paris by William Wilson Corcoran, but it is unclear who the original designer was. According to the Smithsonian Institution Research Information System, they may have been designed by Downing or Calvert Vaux. The furnaces at the Navy Yard where the urns were cast were designed by Adolph Cluss and had previously been used to produce cannons during the Civil War.

=== Description ===
The urns, measuring 5-feet tall (1.5 m) and 4-feet wide (1.2 m), are made of bronze and are similar in design to ones found at the Palace of Versailles. They feature a classical figure motif and each urn is inscribed "Ordnance Department, U.S. Navy Yard, Washington D.C. 1872". They originally stood on the east and west sides of the Jackson statue, resting on granites bases set amongst flower beds. Robeson described them as "extremely good examples of the work of government mechanics and workshops." Although each urn contains a decorative motif, they are different than the designs found on the Andrew Jackson Downing Urn. That urn was created in 1856 and is located in the Enid A. Haupt Garden.

=== Later history ===
In 1879, flowers were placed in the urns, but were later removed. In 1919, during the fight for women's suffrage in the United States, a group of women protesters in front of the White House burned printed speeches by President Woodrow Wilson. Instead of a metal tub that was used as a firepit, at least one protester started another fire inside one of the urns. It was extinguished by other protesters and security personnel.

In 1936, during an improvement project of the square by the Works Progress Administration, the urns were moved to the center of each side of the park, near Jackson Place and Madison Place, small streets on either side of Lafayette Square. The urns were last moved in 1969. They stand on granite pedestals near the south entrance to the square.

The urns are contributing properties to the Lafayette Square Historic District, a National Historic Landmark, that was listed on the National Register of Historic Places (NRHP) on August 29, 1970, and the District of Columbia Inventory of Historic Sites (DCIHS) on June 19, 1973. They are also contributing properties to the L'Enfant Plan, listed on the NRHP on April 24, 1997, and the DCIHS on January 19, 1971.

== See also ==
- Cuban Friendship Urn
- Andrew Jackson Downing Urn
- List of public art in Washington, D.C., Ward 2
- National Register of Historic Places listings in Washington, D.C.
- Outdoor sculpture in Washington, D.C.
