= Archives of American Gardens =

US-based archive

- Established: 1992
- Location: Capital Gallery Building, Washington, D.C.
- Coordinates: 38.885955°N 77.021499°W
- Type: Archives
- Public transit access: L'Enfant Plaza (Washington Metro)
- Website: Official website

The Archives of American Gardens (known colloquially as AAG) is an archive dedicated to preserving documentation and content related to gardens in the United States. Established in 1992, the Archives are located in Washington, D.C., United States, and are maintained by Smithsonian Gardens, a unit of the Smithsonian Institution.

As a research center, the Archives of American Gardens houses around 80,000 photographic images and records about over 6,350 gardens throughout the United States. Photographs and images date from the 1870s to the present and showcase garden features such as fountains, sculptures, fences and gates, parterres, and garden structures. The Archives also documents garden styles, such as large Italianate estates, herb and rose gardens, cottage and patio gardens, xeriscapes, and community gardens.

== Collection ==
The AAG maintains photographs, images, drawings, written documentation, business files, garden plans, and related material of over 6,350 gardens in the United States. It also collects documentation related to landscape architects, including the collections of Thomas Warren Sears, Robert M. Fletcher, and Perry Wheeler. The Garden Club of America Collection, which was donated in 1992, includes documentation of landscape architects such as Marian Coffin, Lawrence Halprin, Beatrix Farrand, Hare & Hare, Gertrude Jekyll, Umberto Innocenti, Jens Jensen, Charles Platt, Ellen Biddle Shipman, and Fletcher Steele. Also present are the collections of J. Horace McFarland, Katharine Lane Weems's estate, The Chimneys, postcard collections, and documentation about the Smithsonian's gardens.

The Archives has a collection of over 37,000 35mm slides of gardens and a collection of over 3,000 hand-colored glass lantern slides from the 1920s and 1930s. The lantern slides were created by Garden Club of America members in the early 20th century for use in lectures and presentations and are a valuable record of hundreds of early 20th-century American gardens. They had been stored in the offices of the GCA and were nearly disposed of and lost in the 1960s before GCA Bulletin photographic editor Harriet Jackson Phelps realized their historical value. After many failed attempts to get them housed in museums or institutions at the time, they were divided and stored by members until the Archives agreed to house them. Much of their importance lies in the documenting of many gardens that no longer exist or have fallen into disrepair. Other gardens, such as the Phipps Conservatory & Botanical Gardens in Pittsburgh, Pennsylvania, have gone through several incarnations, and important information on early plantings has been preserved.

Local garden clubs affiliated with the Garden Club of America, such as the Litchfield Garden Club in Litchfield County, Connecticut, are documenting their local gardens and submitting to the archives.

To encourage the study of garden history and garden design and aid in cataloging The Garden Club of America Collection at the Archives, the Garden Club of America has a scholarship program for undergraduate and graduate students to intern at the Archives of American Gardens.

"Community of Gardens" is a website and a free mobile app where people can view some of the digital archives of AAG and share their own personal stories, photos, videos, and audio of gardens around the world.
