= Mary Livingston (disambiguation) =

Mary Livingston (c. 1541–1589) was a Scottish noblewoman and childhood companion of Mary, Queen of Scots. Mary Livingston may also refer to:

- Mary Livingston Ludlow, birth name of Valentine Gill Hall Jr. (1834–1880), American socialite, banker, and merchant
- Mary Livingston Ripley (1914–1996), American horticulturist, entomologist, photographer, and scientific collector
