= Smithsonian Gardens =

Division of the Smithsonian Institution

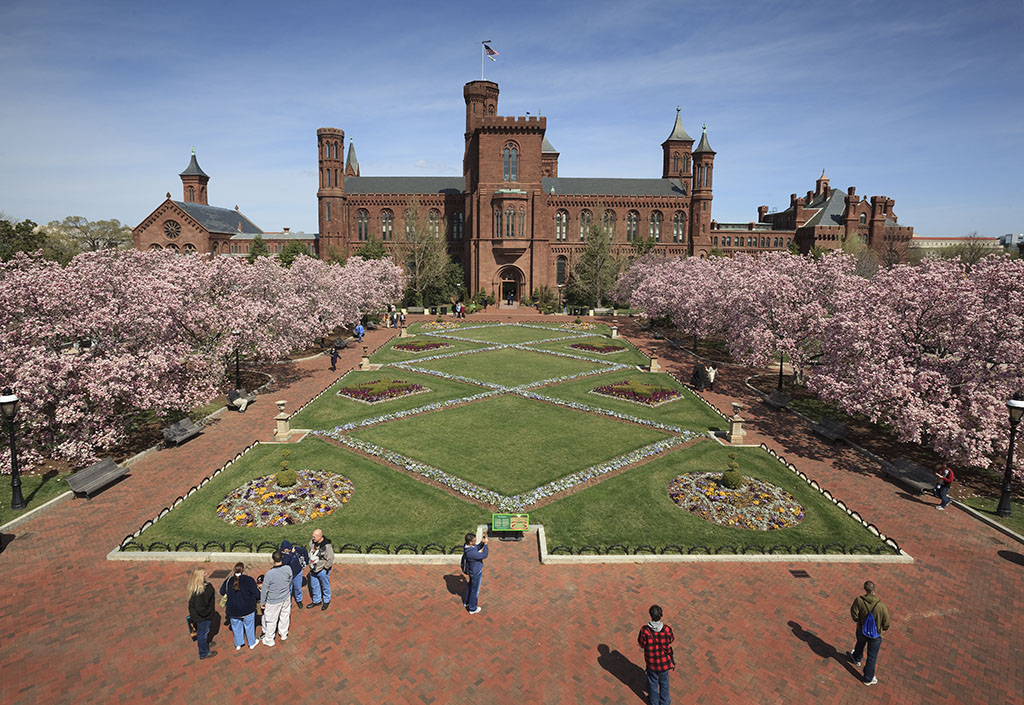
- Parterre of the Enid A. Haupt Garden
- Established: 1972
- Location: The National Mall, Washington, D.C.
- Type: public gardens and archives
- Director: Joy Columbus
- Public transit access: L'Enfant Plaza Metro Stop or Smithsonian Metro Stop (Washington Metro)
- Website: gardens.si.edu

The Smithsonian Gardens, a division of the Smithsonian Institution, is responsible for the "landscapes, interiorscapes, and horticulture-related collections and exhibits", which serve as an outdoor extension of the Smithsonian's museums and learning spaces in Washington, D.C. Established in 1972 as a groundskeeping and horticulture program, Smithsonian Gardens currently manages 180 acres of gardens on the National Mall, 64,000 square feet of greenhouse production space, and the Archives of American Gardens, a research collection of over 60,000 photographs and archival records covering American landscape history from the 1870s to the present.

== History ==
In 1972, the eighth secretary of the Smithsonian, S. Dillon Ripley, established the Office of Horticulture, with the intention of extending the Smithsonian's research and education efforts to its outdoor spaces. Ripley hired James R. Buckler as its first director and the first horticulturalist at the Institution. The office was created at a time when gardening was increasing in popularity across the United States, and its educational mission was buoyed by this surge of interest from the public. Buckler's first assignment was to research and plan for the Victorian garden that was installed between the Smithsonian Castle and Independence avenue in celebration of the United States Bicentennial in 1976. The popularity of the Victorian garden would later provide design inspiration for the Enid A. Haupt Garden's central parterre.

Buckler served as director of the Office of Horticulture for 23 years. Buckler was succeeded by Nancy J. Bechtol, who served as the Director of the Horticulture Services Division from 1995 until 2002.

In 2009, the Smithsonian Institution changed the name from the Horticulture Services Division to the Smithsonian Gardens; the change was announced to the public in 2010.

== Gardens and landscapes ==
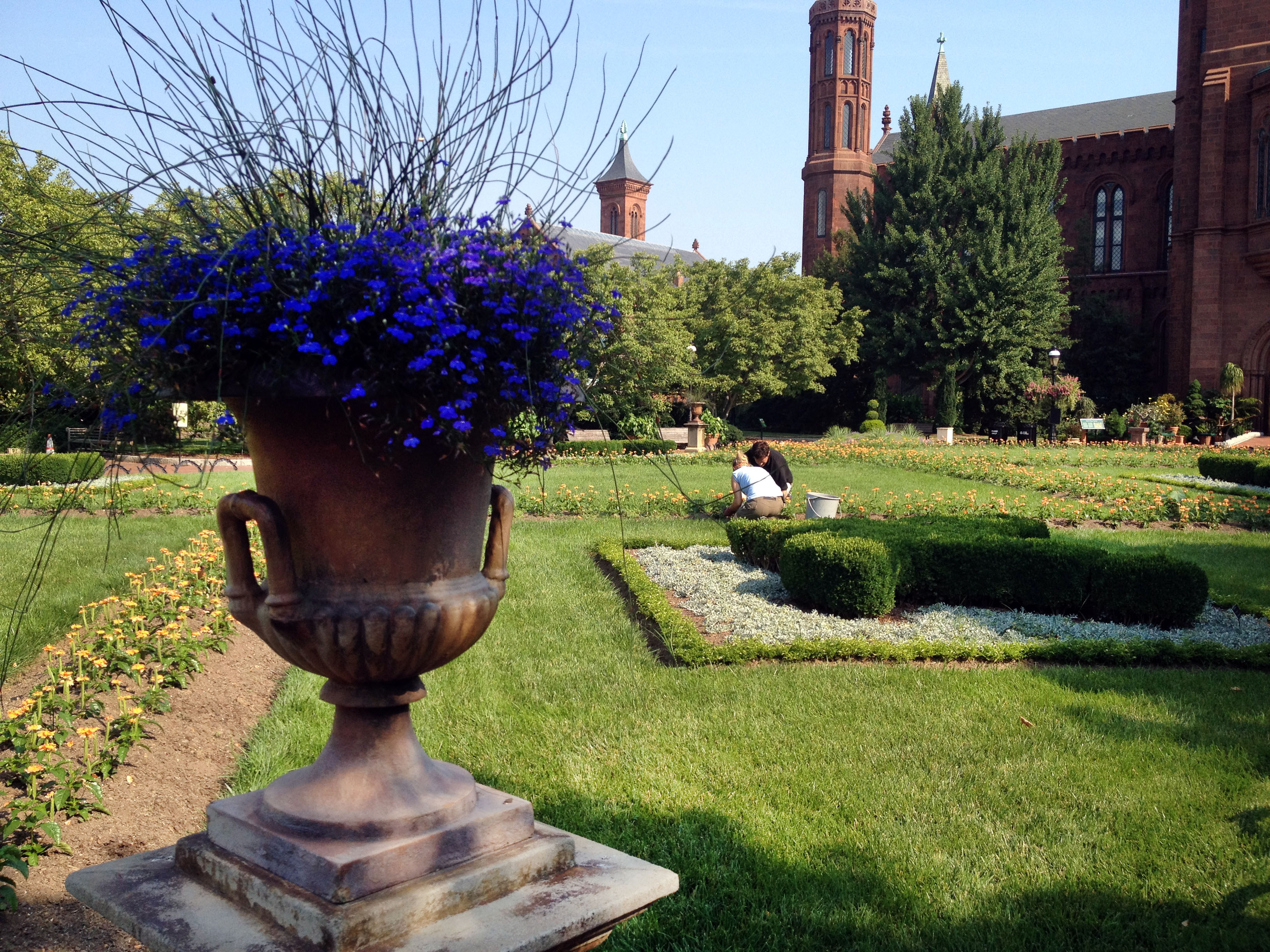
Ground view of the Parterre of the Enid A. Haupt Garden

The Smithsonian Gardens manage a number of gardens and landscapes, most of which are near the Smithsonian's museums on the National Mall. These include:

- Common Ground: Our American Garden, flanking the National Museum of American History’s south entrance facing the National Mall
- Enid A. Haupt Garden, a rooftop garden above the S. Dillon Ripley Center, Arthur M. Sackler Gallery, and National Museum of African Art, between the Smithsonian Castle and Independence Avenue
- Freer Gallery of Art Courtyard Garden
- Hirshhorn Museum and Sculpture Garden
- Kathrine Dulin Folger Rose Garden, on the east side of the Smithsonian Institution Building ("The Castle"), in front of the main façade of the Arts and Industries Building
- Mary Livingston Ripley Garden, between the Arts and Industries Building and the Hirshhorn Museum and Sculpture Garden
- National Air and Space Museum landscape
- Native landscape at the National Museum of the American Indian
- Pollinator Garden (formerly the Butterfly Habitat Garden) east of the National Museum of Natural History
- Robert and Arlene Kogod Courtyard in the Donald W. Reynolds Center for American Art and Portraiture
- Urban Bird Habitat, around the south, west, and north sides of the National Museum of Natural History
- Victory Garden, on the west terrace of the National Museum of American History

Smithsonian Gardens practices integrated pest management as a way of controlling garden pests in all of the gardens and landscapes it manages. These methods are intended to produce as little hazard to people and the environment as possible.

A plant production facility, completed in 2010, is located at the Museum Support Center in Suitland, Maryland serves as the base of production and maintenance of plant material for the gardens and horticultural exhibits throughout the Smithsonian Institution. It houses numerous horticultural specimens, interior display plants, and also includes a greenhouse devoted to nectar plants used for the Butterfly Pavilion at the National Museum of Natural History.

Prior to the building of the Suitland greenhouse facility, plants were cultivated in 11 greenhouses located on the grounds of the U.S. Soldiers' and Airmen's Home in Washington, D.C.

== Collections ==
The Smithsonian Orchid Collection, which began with five plants in 1974, and has grown into a significant conservation project as additional orchids were donated to the Smithsonian for "safekeeping" and propagation. It now comprises over 8,000 plants representing 256 genera. Specimens are featured in interior plant displays across the Smithsonian museums.

The Archives of American Gardens is a research archive managed by Smithsonian Gardens, and is dedicated to providing landscape designers, historians, preservationists, students, and garden enthusiasts with access to photographic images and records that document over 6,300 historic and contemporary gardens throughout the United States.

The Garden Furnishings and Horticultural Artifacts Collection provides historic insight into horticulture, floriculture, and garden design trends. Some of the antique cast-iron garden furnishings from this collection, including fountains, benches and urns, are exhibited in the Smithsonian gardens.

== Gallery ==
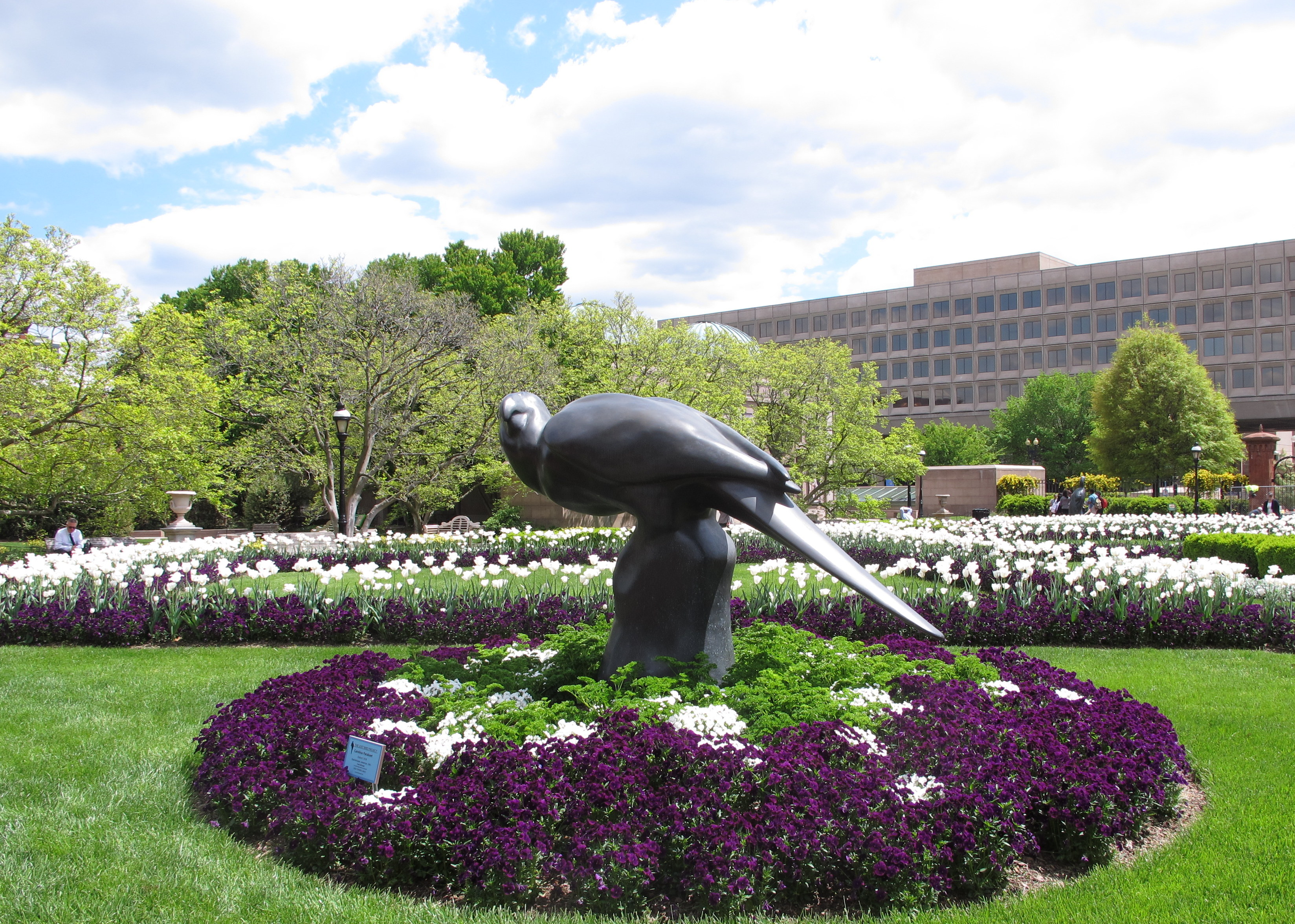
Statue in Haupt Garden.

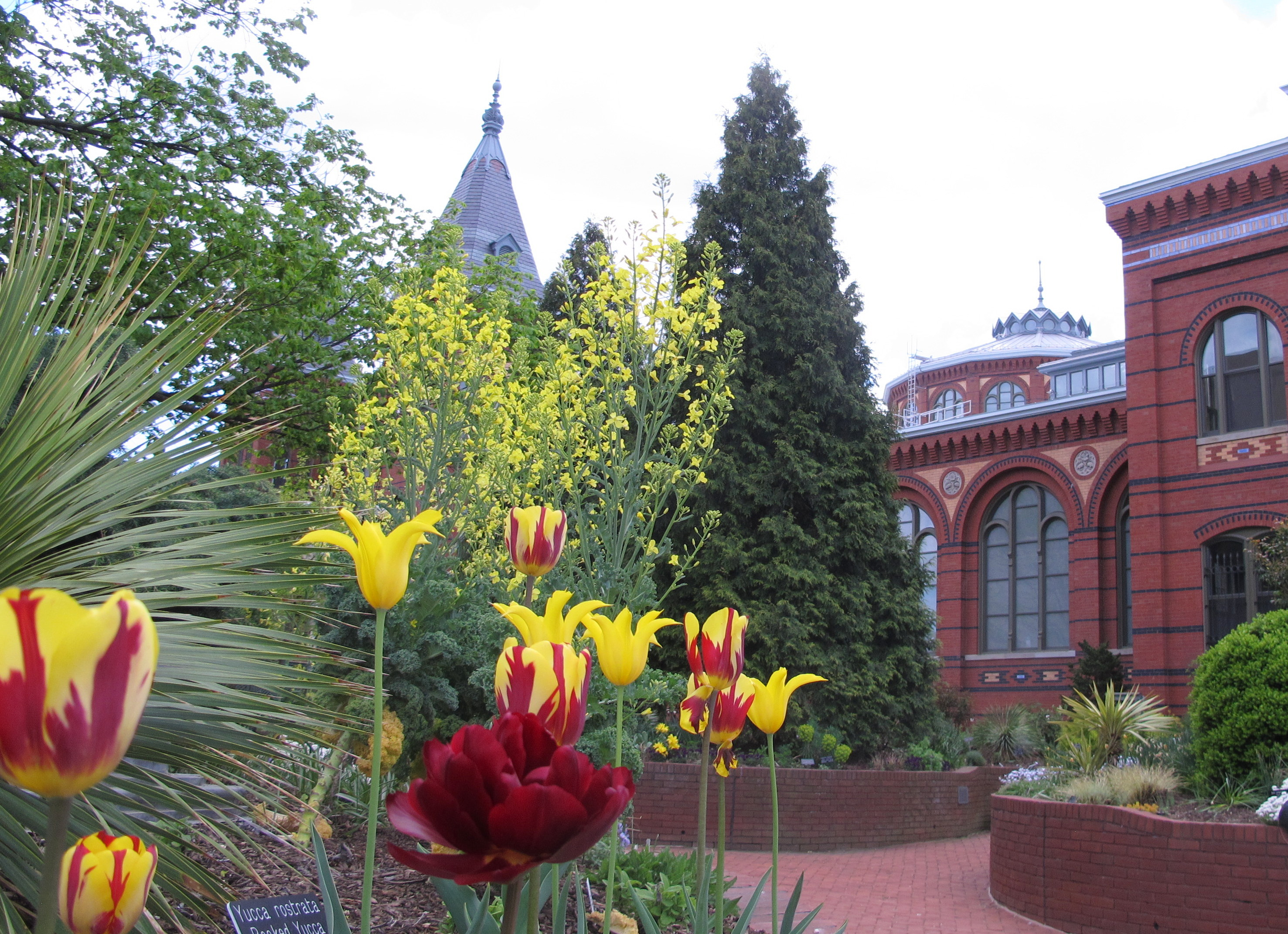
Part of the Ripley Garden.

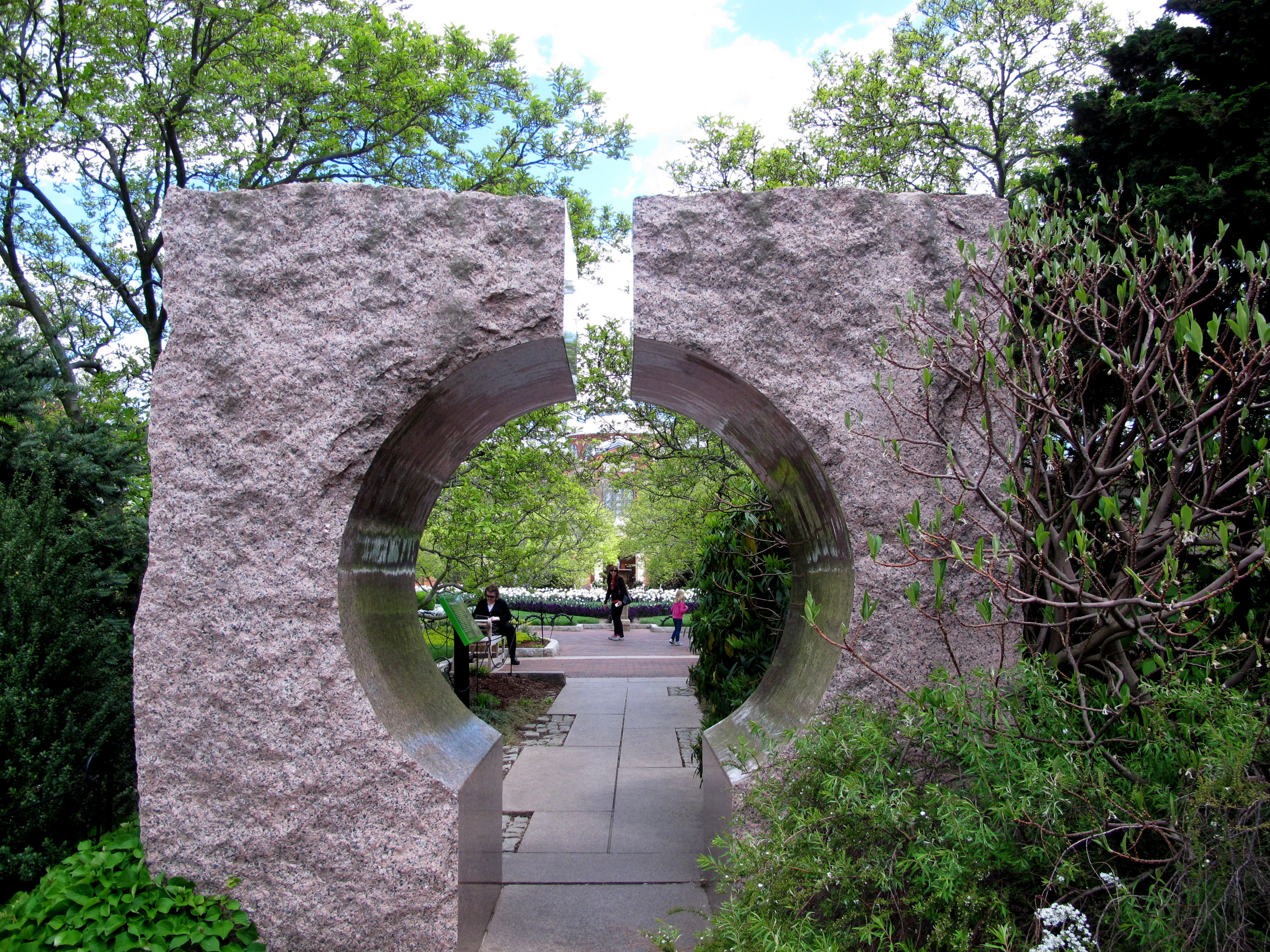
Moon Gate

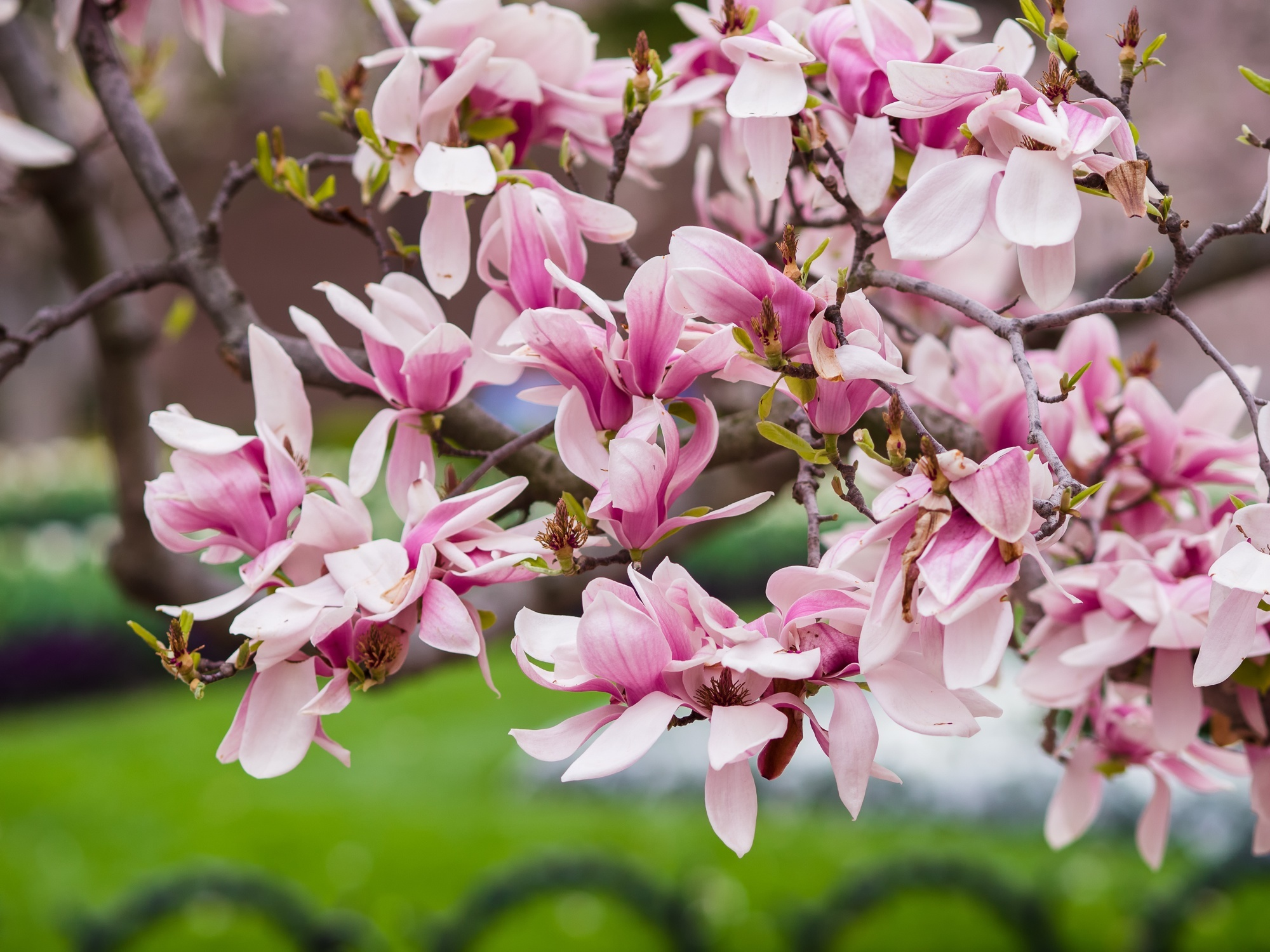
Magnolia in one of the gardens.

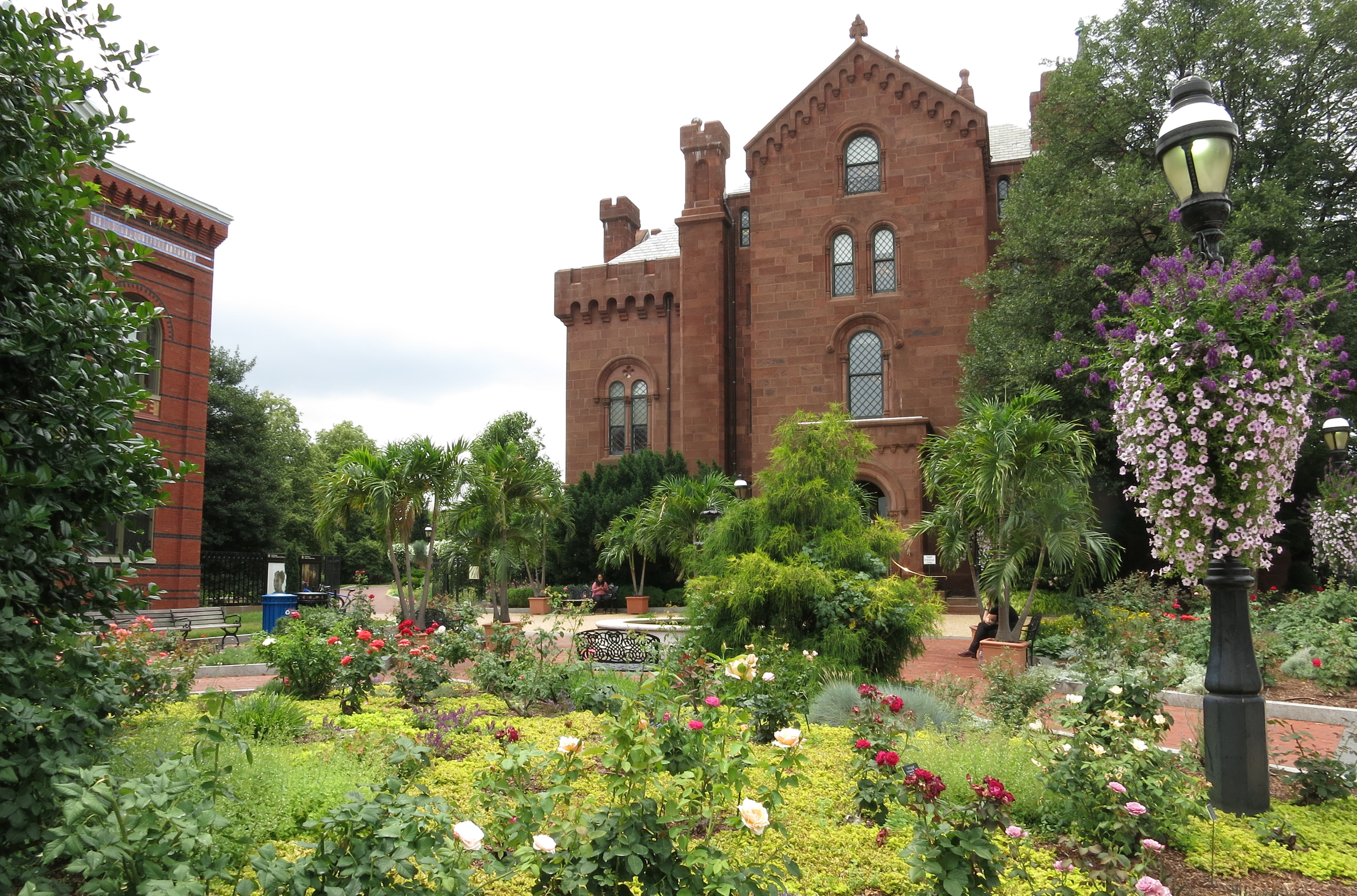
Folger Rose Garden

== See also ==
- List of botanical gardens and arboretums in the United States
