= Andrew Jackson Downing Urn =

Sculpture by Calvert Vaux and Robert Eberhard Launitz

- Downing Urn
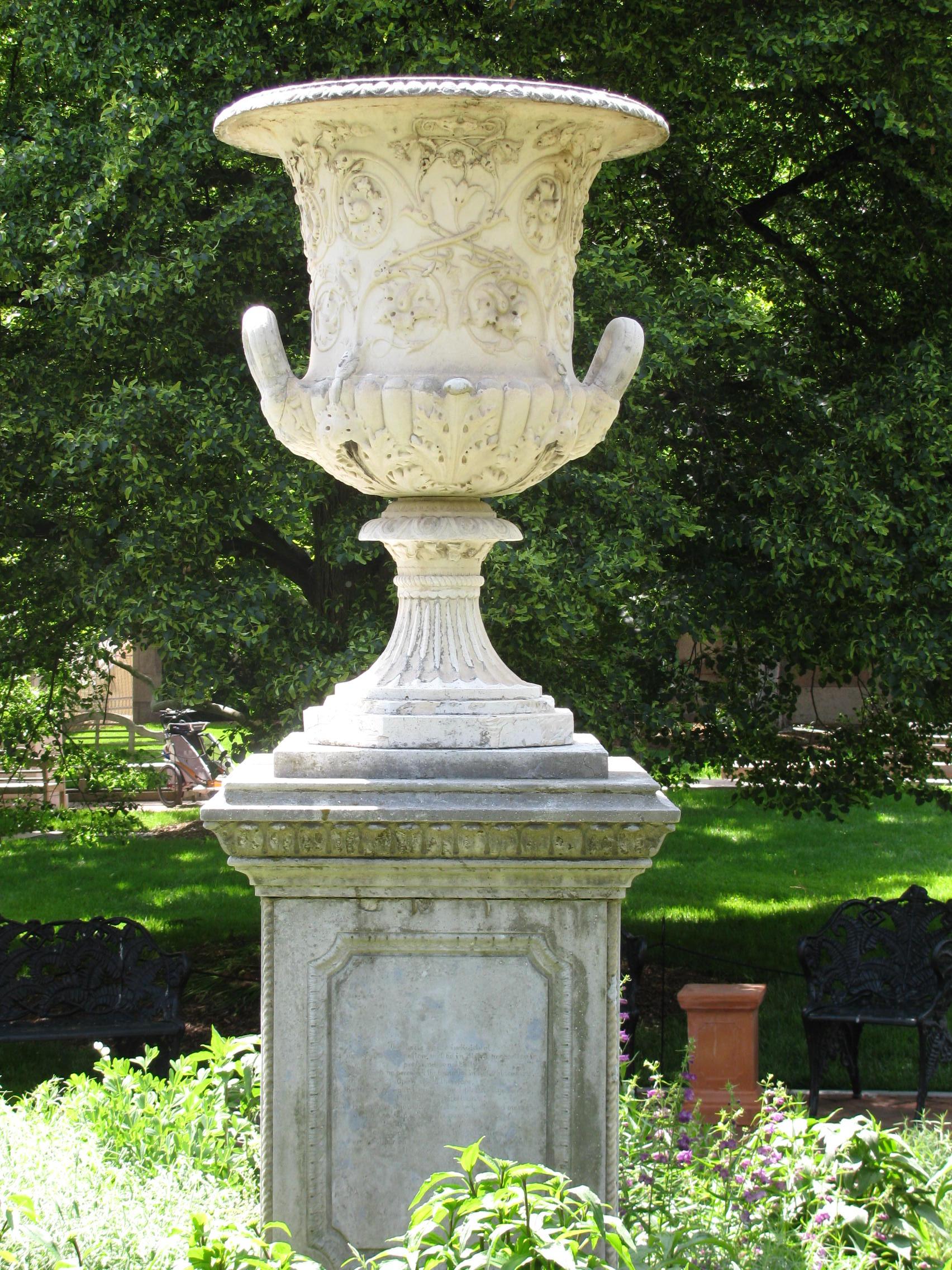
- Artist: Robert Eberhard Launitz
- Year: 1856
- Medium: Carrara marble
- Subject: Andrew Jackson Downing
- Dimensions: 120 cm (4 ft); 61 cm diameter (2 ft)
- Location: Enid A. Haupt Garden; Washington, D.C.; 38°53′19″N 77°1′32″W
- Owner: Smithsonian Institution

The Andrew Jackson Downing Urn, also known as the Downing Urn, is a memorial and public artwork located in the Enid A. Haupt Garden of the Smithsonian Institution on the National Mall in Washington, D.C.

The outdoor sculpture of a garden vase−urn commemorates Andrew Jackson Downing (1815–1852), an American landscape designer and horticulturalist, and considered to be one of the founders of American landscape architecture. Shortly before dying at the age of 37, Downing developed a landscape plan for the National Mall that the United States government partially implemented until replacing it with the McMillan Plan of 1902 (see History of the National Mall).

== History ==
Architect and landscape designer Calvert Vaux designed the memorial urn, which Robert Eberhard Launitz sculpted. The urn was located and dedicated on the National Mall in September 1856, where it stood near the Smithsonian's National Museum of Natural History until 1965, when it was moved to the east entrance of the Smithsonian Institution Building (the "Castle"). In 1972, the urn was restored, moved to the west entrance of the Castle and rededicated. In 1987, it was relocated to the Rose Garden at the Castle's east door. The urn was moved to the Enid A. Haupt Garden in 1989.

== Inscription ==
The inscription reads,
(on the south face of the base):

THIS VASE

WAS ERECTED BY HIS FRIENDS
IN MEMORY OF
ANDREW JACKSON DOWNING.
WHO DIED JULY 28, 1852, AGED 37 YEARS
HE WAS BORN AND LIVED,
AND DIED UPON THE HUDSON RIVER.
HIS LIFE WAS DEVOTED TO THE IMPROVEMENT OF THE NATIONAL
TASTE IN RURAL ART,
WHICH HE LIVED HAD FULLY ENDOWED HIM.
HIS SUCCESS WAS AS GREAT AS HIS GENIUS AND FOR THE DEATH
OF FEW PUBLIC MEN
WAS PUBLIC GRIEF EVER MORE SINCERE.
WHEN THESE GROUNDS WERE PROPOSED, HE WAS AT ONCE
CALLED TO DESIGN THEM:
BUT BEFORE THEY WERE COMPLETED HE PERISHED IN THE WRECK
OF THE STEAMER HENRY CLAY.
HIS MIND WAS SINGULARLY JUST, PENETRATING AND ORIGINAL
HIS MANNERS WERE CALM, RESERVED, AND COURTEOUS.
HIS PERSONAL MEMORY
BELONGS TO THE FRIENDS WHO LOVE HIM:
HIS FAME TO THE COUNTRY WHICH HONORS AND LAMENTS HIM.

== See also ==
- Cuban Friendship Urn
- Navy Yard Urns
- List of public art in Washington, D.C., Ward 2
