= Cuban Friendship Urn =

Statue in Washington, D.C., U.S.

- U.S. National Register of Historic Places
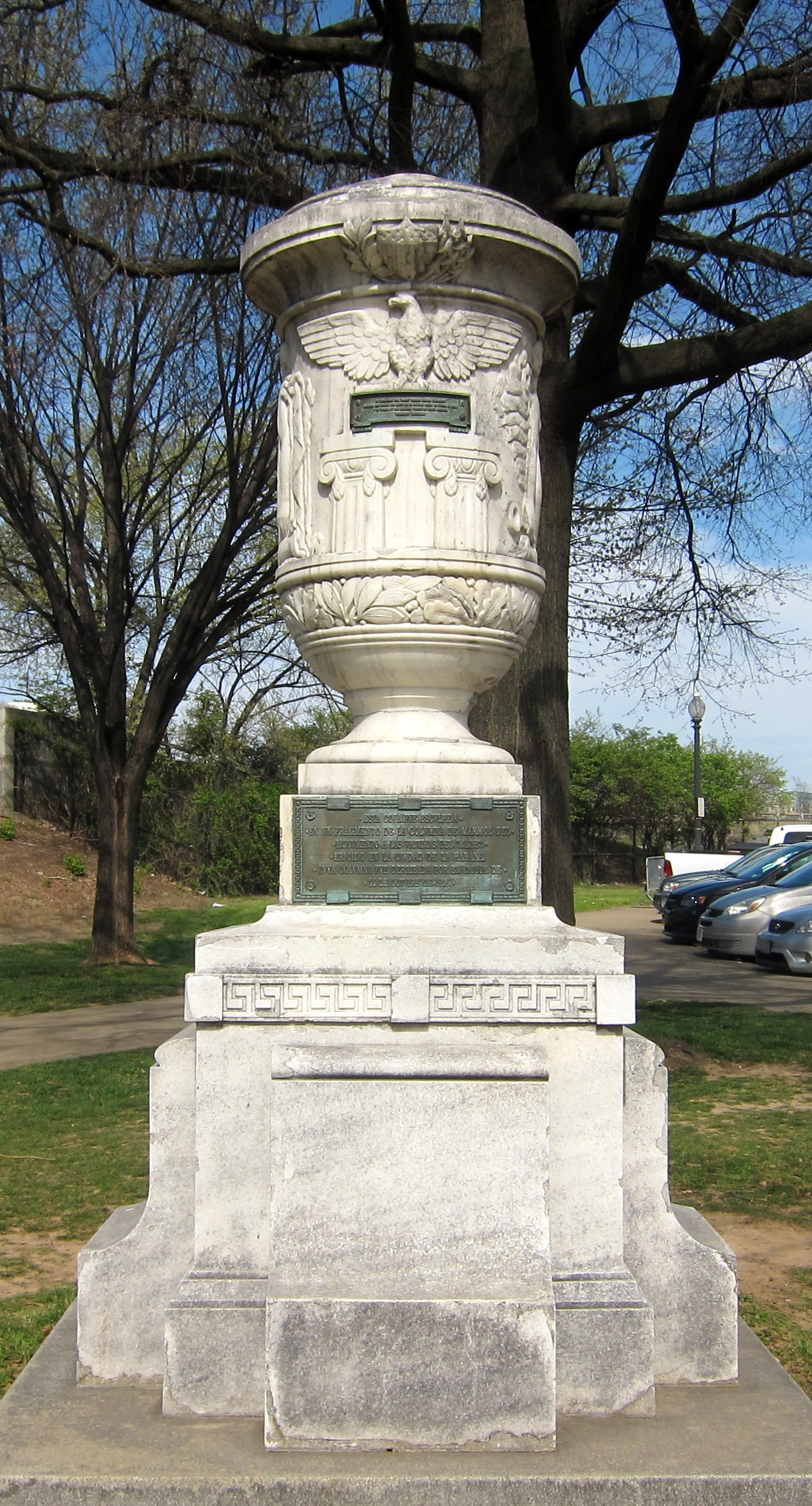

- Location within Central Washington, D.C. Location within the District of Columbia Location within the United States
- Location: Washington, D.C.
- Coordinates: 38°52′42.8″N 77°2′17.7″W
- MPS: Memorials in Washington, D.C.
- NRHP reference No.: 07001053
- Added to NRHP: October 11, 2007

The Cuban Friendship Urn, also known as the Cuban–American Friendship Urn or USS Maine Memorial, is a marble statue in Washington, D.C., listed on the National Register of Historic Places. The monument originally stood in Cuba to honor the American deaths aboard the USS Maine preceding the Spanish–American War in 1898.

== Description ==
It is located on Ohio Drive, Southwest, Washington, D.C., in West Potomac Park (next to the boundary of East Potomac Park), south of the Tidal Basin near the north end of the 14th Street Bridge. Decorations on the 7-foot (2.1 m) tall urn include an eagle with its wings outstretched and human figures depicted in a neoclassical style. It once stood atop a column of marble in Havana, to commemorate the U.S. sailors and Marines who lost their lives aboard the USS Maine when it sank in Havana harbor in 1898, and the friendship and bonds between Cuba and the United States. A Spanish inscription on the urn reads:

EL RECUERDO DEL "MAINE" TENDRA ETERNA DURACION

DURANTE LOS SIGLOS LOS LAZOS DE LA AMISTAD ENTRE LA TIERRA DE CUBA
Y LA TIERRA DE LOS ESTADOS UNIDOS DE NORTE AMERICA
GERARDO MACHADO

And in English translation:

The memory of the Maine will last forever through the centuries as will the bonds of friendship between the homeland of Cuba and the homeland of the United States of North America. —Gerardo Machado

An inscription on the base reads:

ESTA COPA FVE ESCVLPIDA

EN VN FRAGMENTO DE LA COLVMNA DE MARMOL DEL
MONVMENTO A LAS VICTIMAS DEL "MAINE".
ERICIDO EN LA CIVDAD DE LA HABANA,
CVYA COLVMNA FVE DERRIBADA POR EL CICLON DE
20 DE OCTVBRE DE 1926.

And in English translation:

This urn was sculpted from a fragment of the marble column of the Monument to the Victims of the Maine. Erected in the City of Havana, this column was taken down by the hurricane of October 20, 1926.

== History ==
A hurricane in October 1926 knocked the marble column over where it stood in Cuba, and in 1928 the urn was sent by Cuban President Gerardo Machado to the United States and presented to President Calvin Coolidge.

Some reports say the urn stood for many years outside the Cuban Embassy on 16th Street, N.W., in Washington. After relations between the United States and Cuba deteriorated following Fidel Castro's rise to power in Cuba in 1959, it disappeared from public view. It may have been stolen by "xenophobic vandals .. during the 1962 Cuban Missile Crisis", or it may have been removed for a construction project.

According to the National Park Service, the urn was placed in a West Potomac Park rose garden in 1928, as directed by Congress, near the future location of the Jefferson Memorial, where it remained until the 1940s, when it was moved for construction of the 14th Street Bridge. In 1963, it was said to be in storage.

A 2009 National Park Service publication states that it was discovered in a National Park Service warehouse in 1992 and moved to its present site. However, in 1996, a local alternative newspaper, The Washington City Paper, reported that the urn had recently been found by the Park Service abandoned in Rock Creek Park "lying on its side". The newspaper later reported that the urn was placed in East Potomac Park in 1998 following repair work that cost $11,000.

In 2007, the urn was placed on the National Register of Historic Places.

It has been called one of the "10 monuments you’ve probably never heard of" in the Washington, D.C., region.

== See also ==
- Andrew Jackson Downing Urn
- Navy Yard Urns
- National Register of Historic Places listings in Washington, D.C.
