= Enid A. Haupt Garden =

Public garden in Washington, D.C.

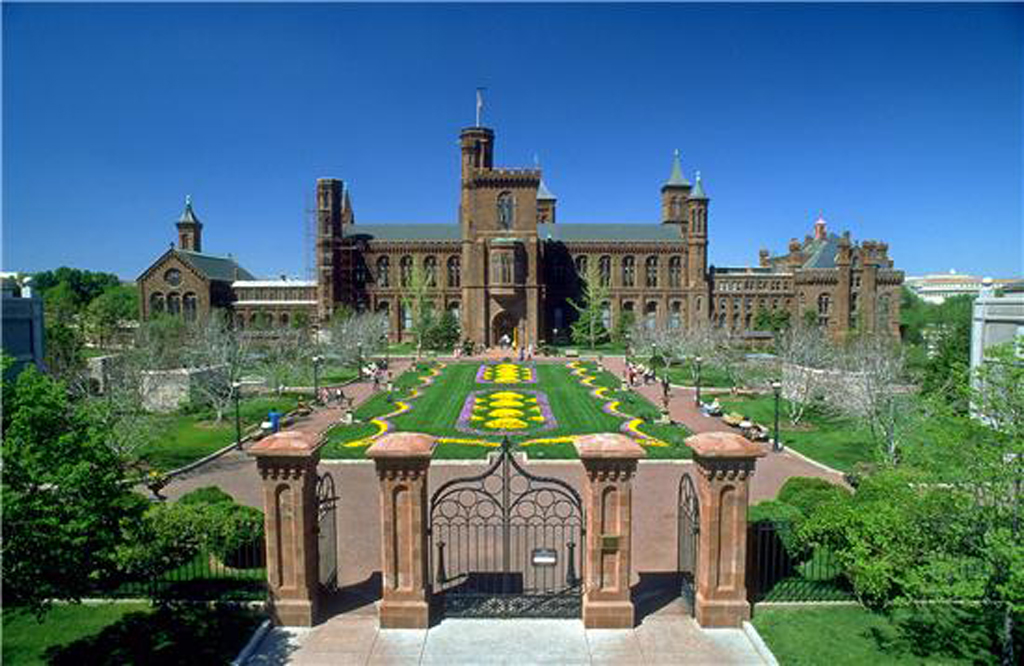
- The Smithsonian Institution Building with the Enid A. Haupt Garden seen in the foreground

- Location within Central Washington, D.C.
- Location: 1037-1057 Independence Avenue Southwest, Washington, D.C.
- Coordinates: 38°53′17″N 77°01′34″W
- Area: 4.2 acres (1.7 ha)
- Opened: May 21, 1987
- Owner: Smithsonian Institution

The Enid A. Haupt Garden is a 4.2 acre public garden in the Smithsonian complex, adjacent to the Smithsonian Institution Building (the "Castle") on the National Mall in Washington, D.C. It was designed to be a modern representation of American Victorian gardens as they appeared in the mid to late 19th century. It replaced an existing Victorian Garden which had been built to celebrate the nation's Bicentennial in 1976.

== History ==
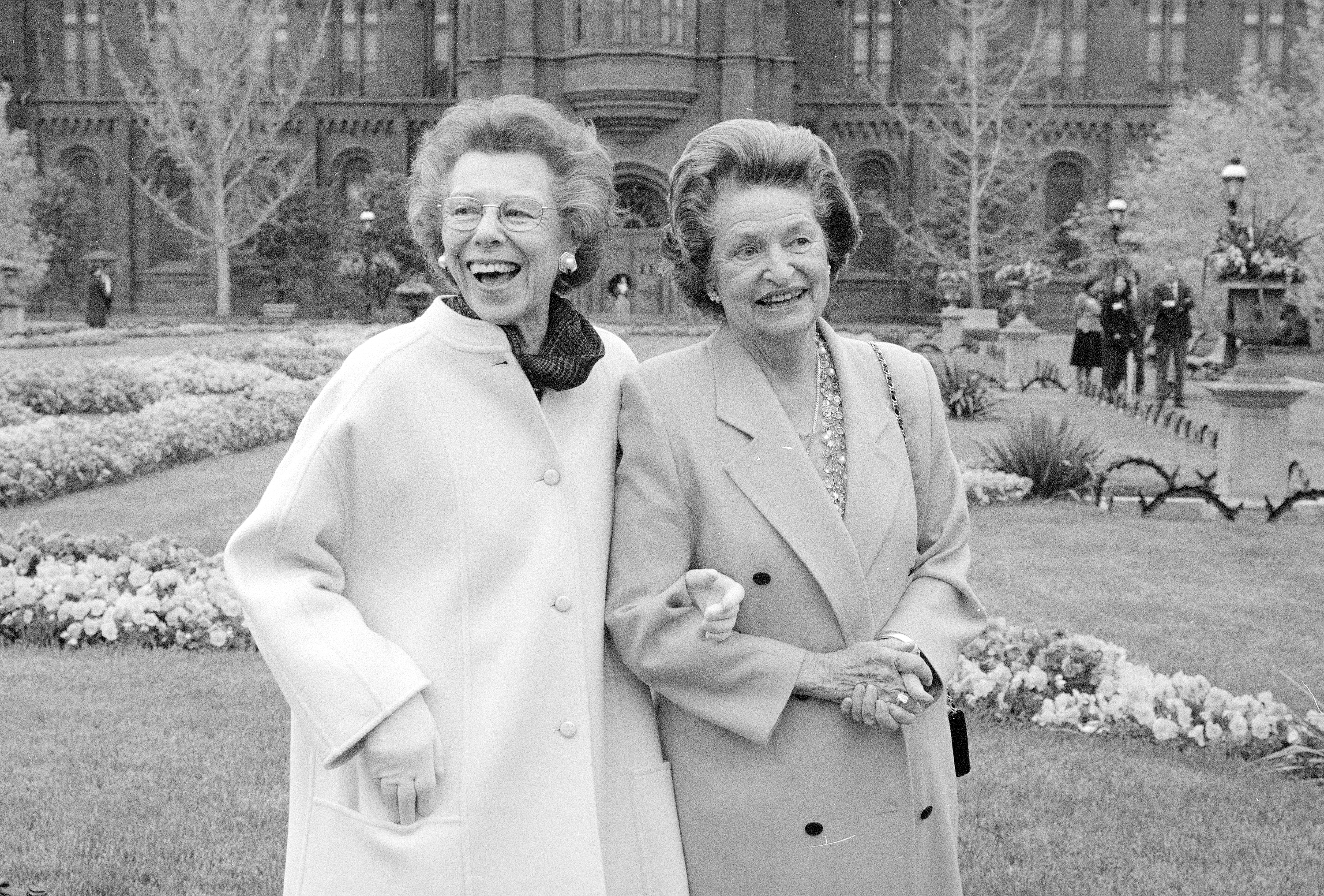
Lady Bird Johnson strolls in the Haupt Garden with its donor Enid A. Haupt (left)

The garden opened on May 21, 1987, as part of the redesigned Castle quadrangle. It is named for Enid A. Haupt, who provided the $3 million endowment which financed its construction and maintenance. Initially approached with a request that she finance a small Zen garden within the quadrangle, after a review of the plans Haupt said that she was "not interested in putting money into a Zen garden...I'm only interested in financing the whole thing."

The quadrangle redesign project and the Smithsonian Gardens more broadly were part of the vision of the eighth Secretary of the Smithsonian, S. Dillon Ripley, who felt that the museum experience should extend beyond the museums' buildings into the outdoor spaces.

The landscape design of the garden featured the collaborative efforts of architect Jean Paul Carlhian, principal in the Boston firm of Shepley, Bulfinch, Richardson and Abbott; Lester Collins; Sasaki Associates Inc. of Watertown, Massachusetts; and James R. Buckler, founding director of the Smithsonian's Office of Horticulture.

The central feature of the garden is a symmetrically patterned parterre, flanked by the Moongate Garden to the west and the Fountain Garden to the east. The parterre measures 144 feet long by 66 feet wide; the low-growing plants that fill out the series of diamonds, fleurs-de-lis, and scallops or swags that make up the design are changed every six months, typically in September and May.

Other notable design features include saucer and tulip magnolias, brick walkways, and historical cast-iron garden furnishings from the Smithsonian Gardens' Garden Furniture Collection. The Andrew Jackson Downing Urn is within a circle in the northeast portion of the parterre.

== Gallery ==
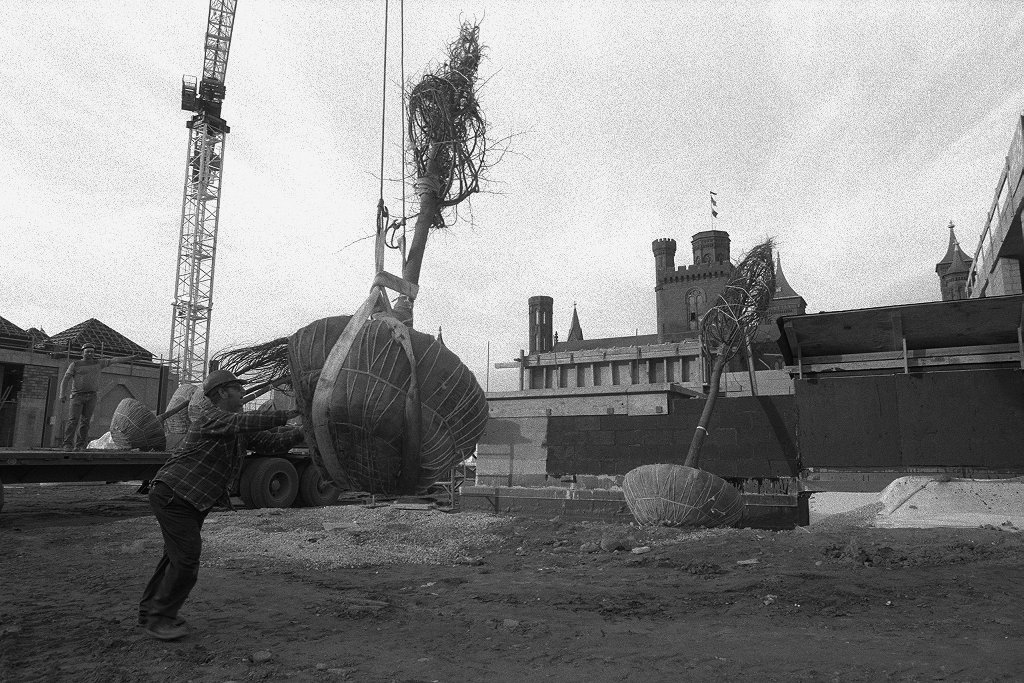
Moving Magnolia Trees for Haupt Garden

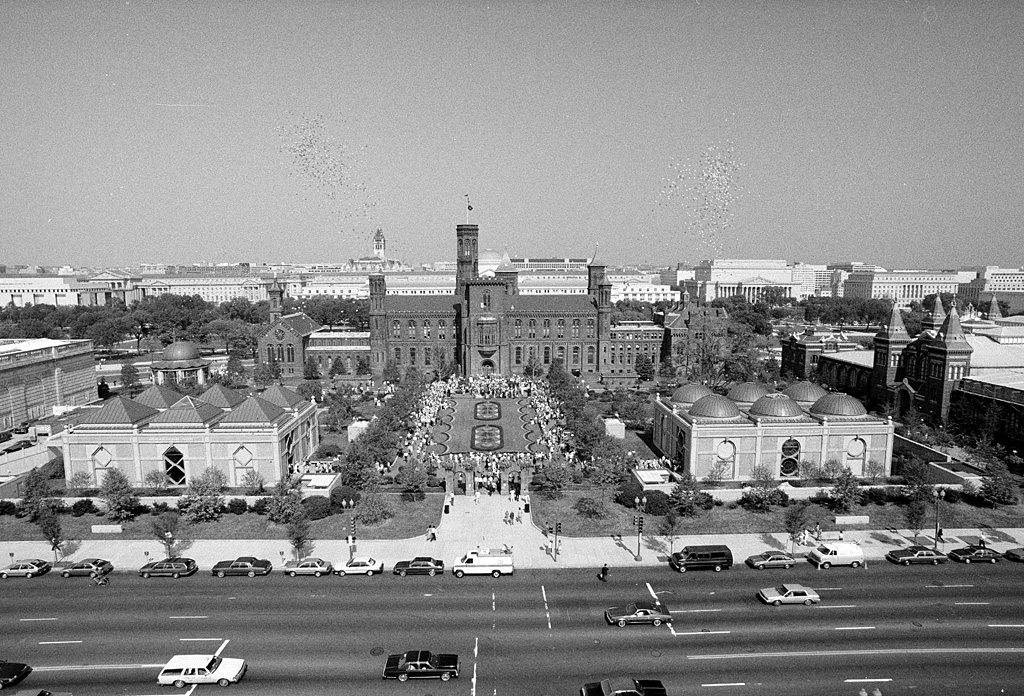
Ribbon Cutting 1987

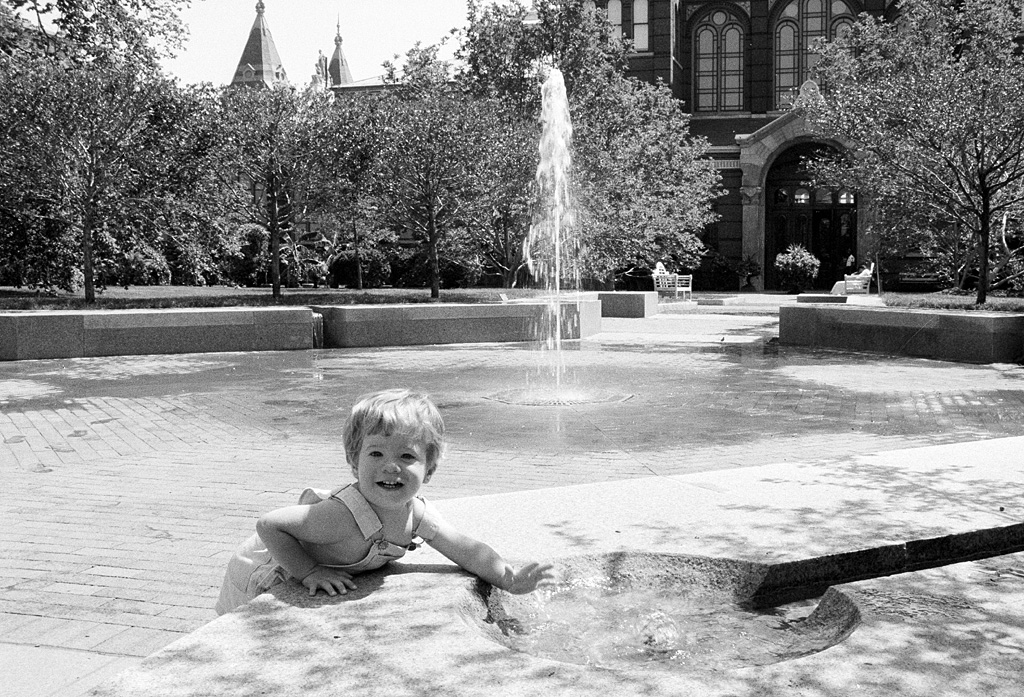
Visitor Playing in Pool of Water

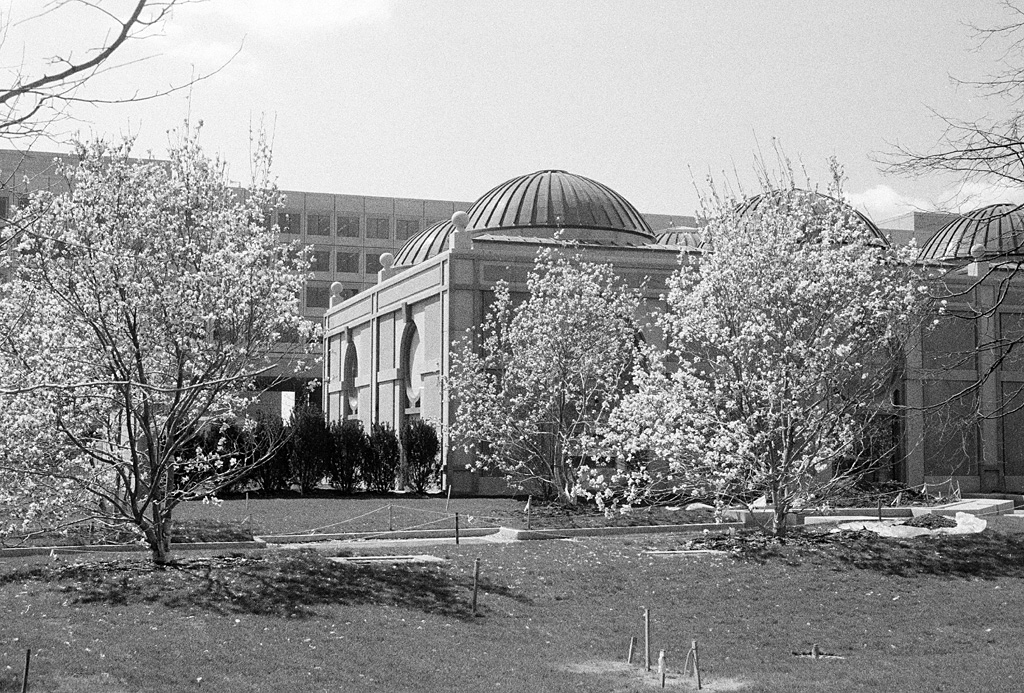
NMAfA and Haupt Garden in the Spring

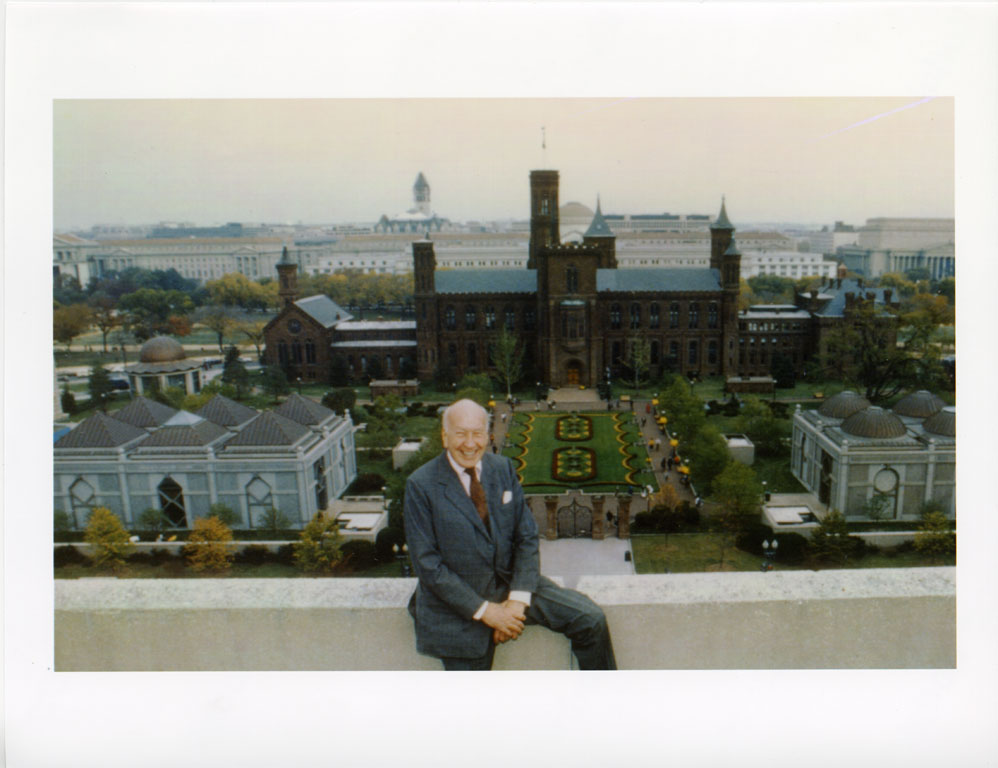
Eighth Secretary of the Smithsonian S. Dillon Ripley with the completed quadrangle and Haupt Garden in the background

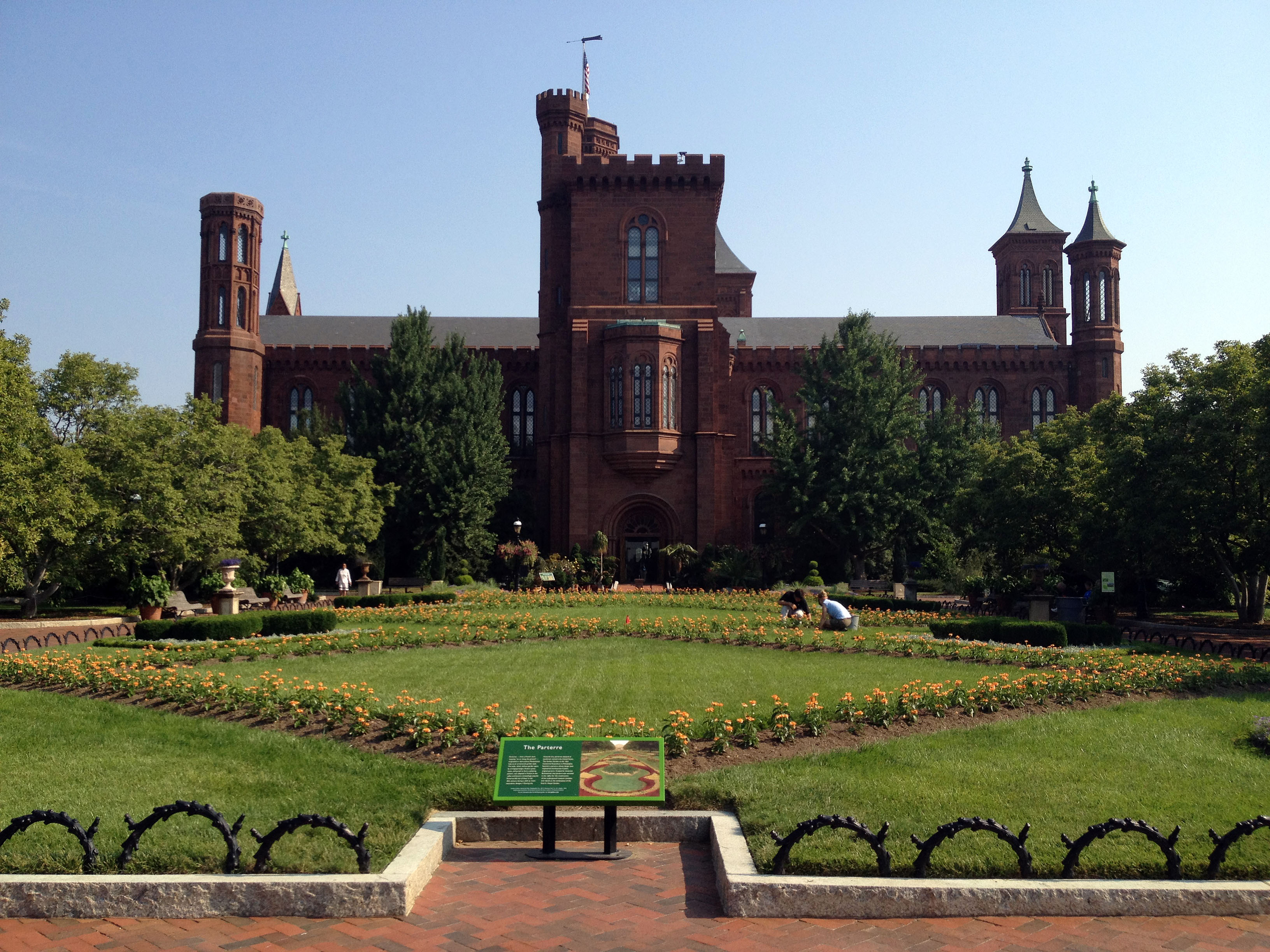
Smithsonian Castle and Haupt garden parterre

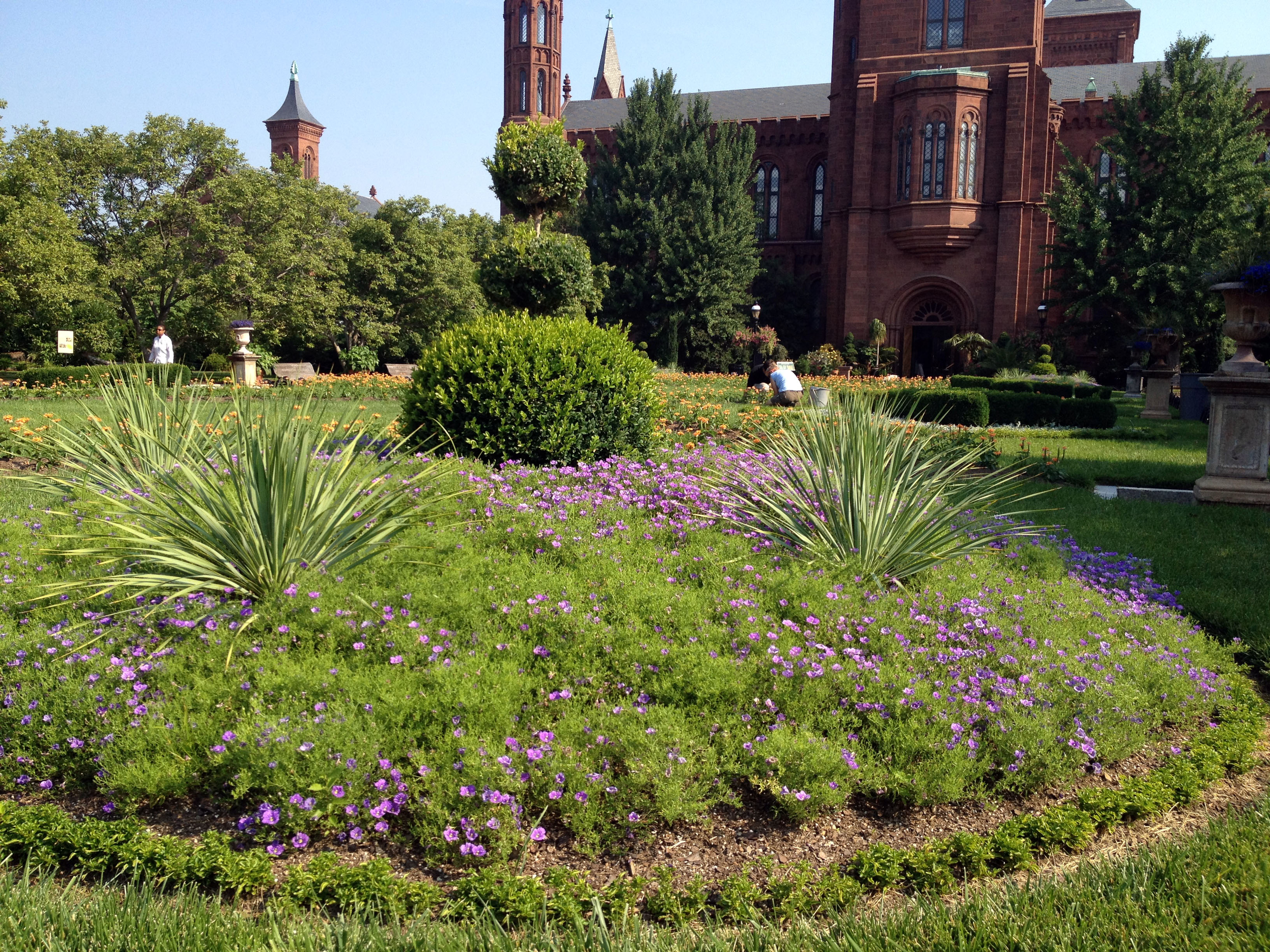
Haupt garden parterre

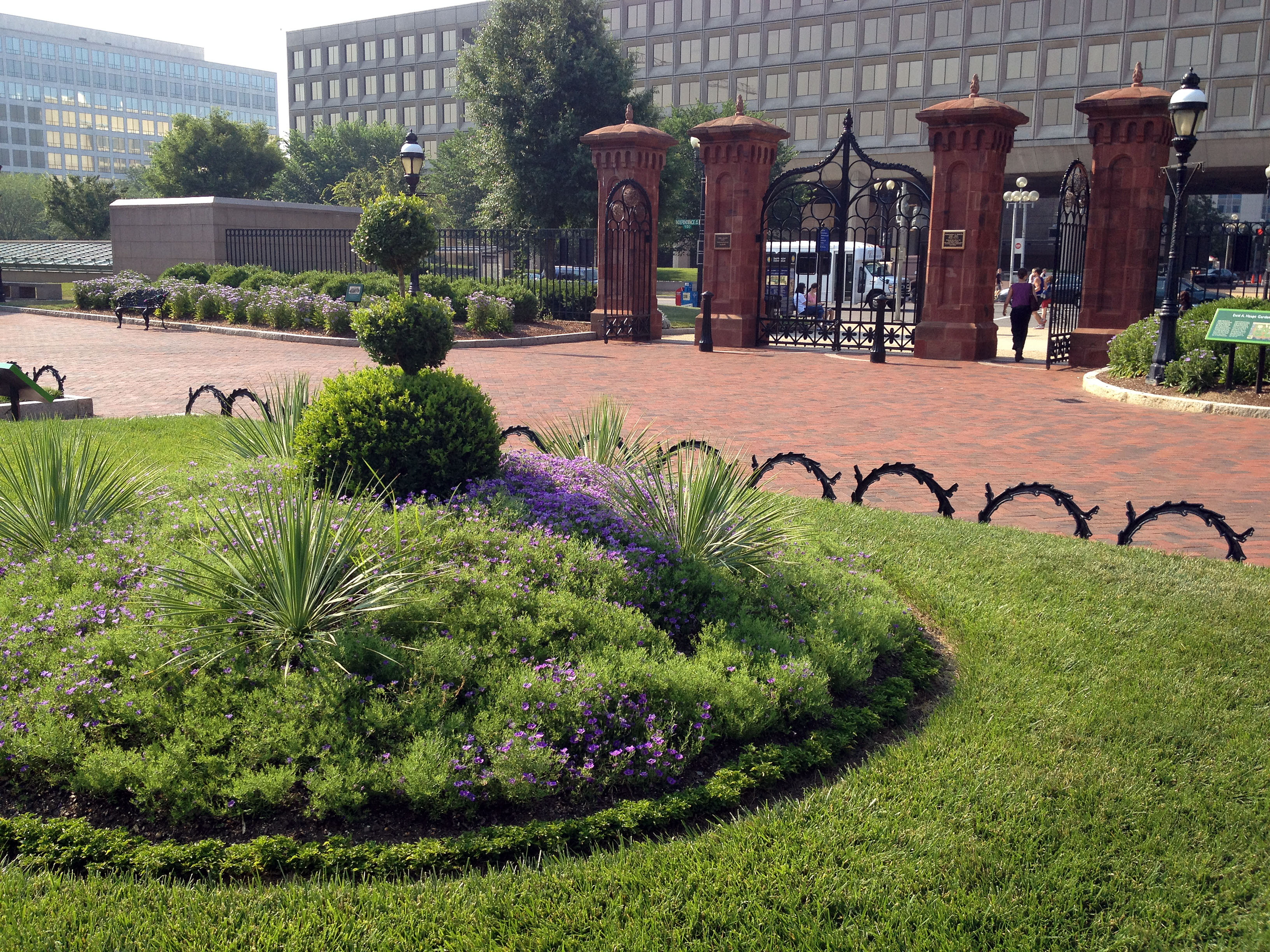
Haupt garden and carriage gates

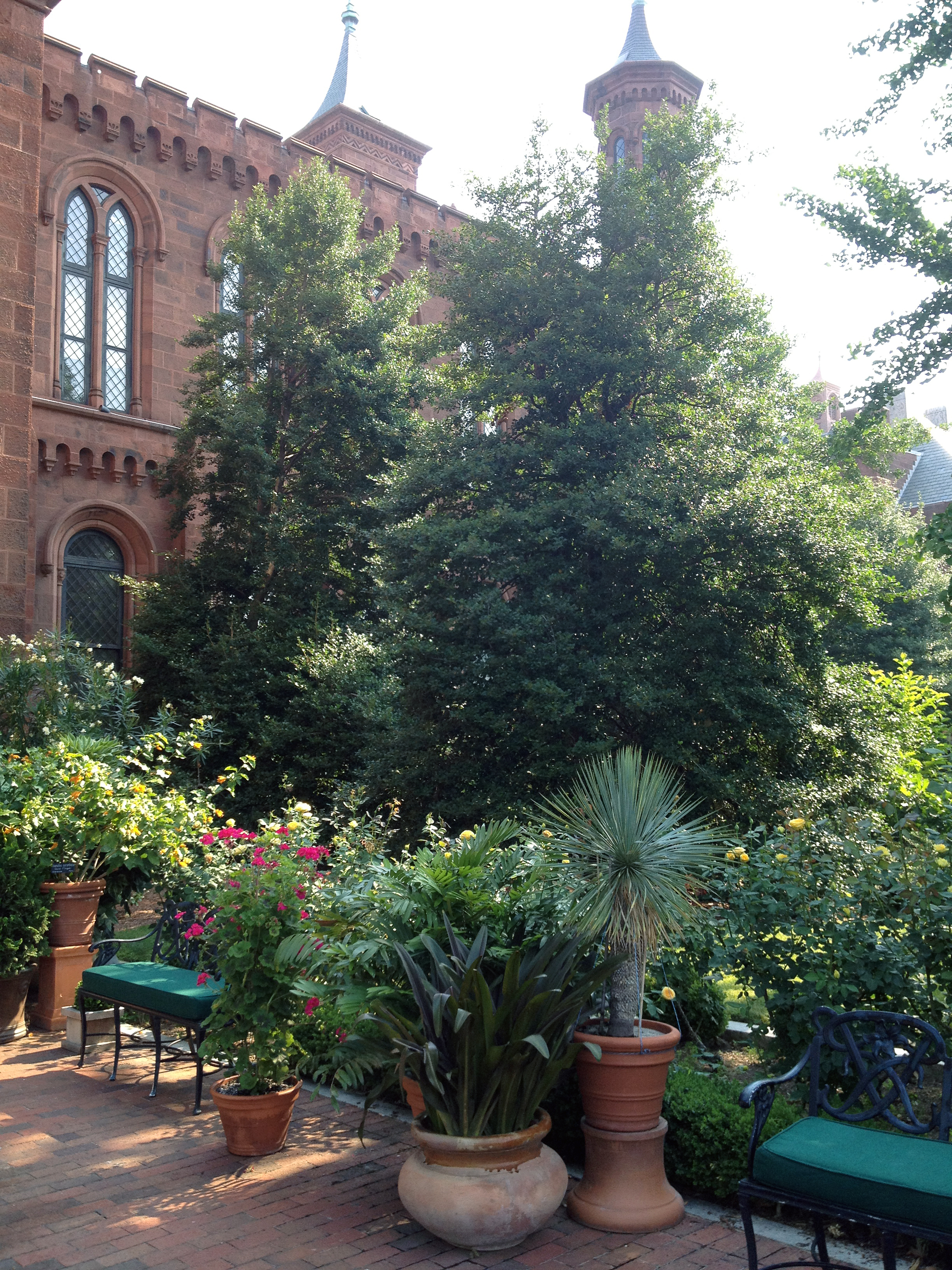
Haupt garden Moongate

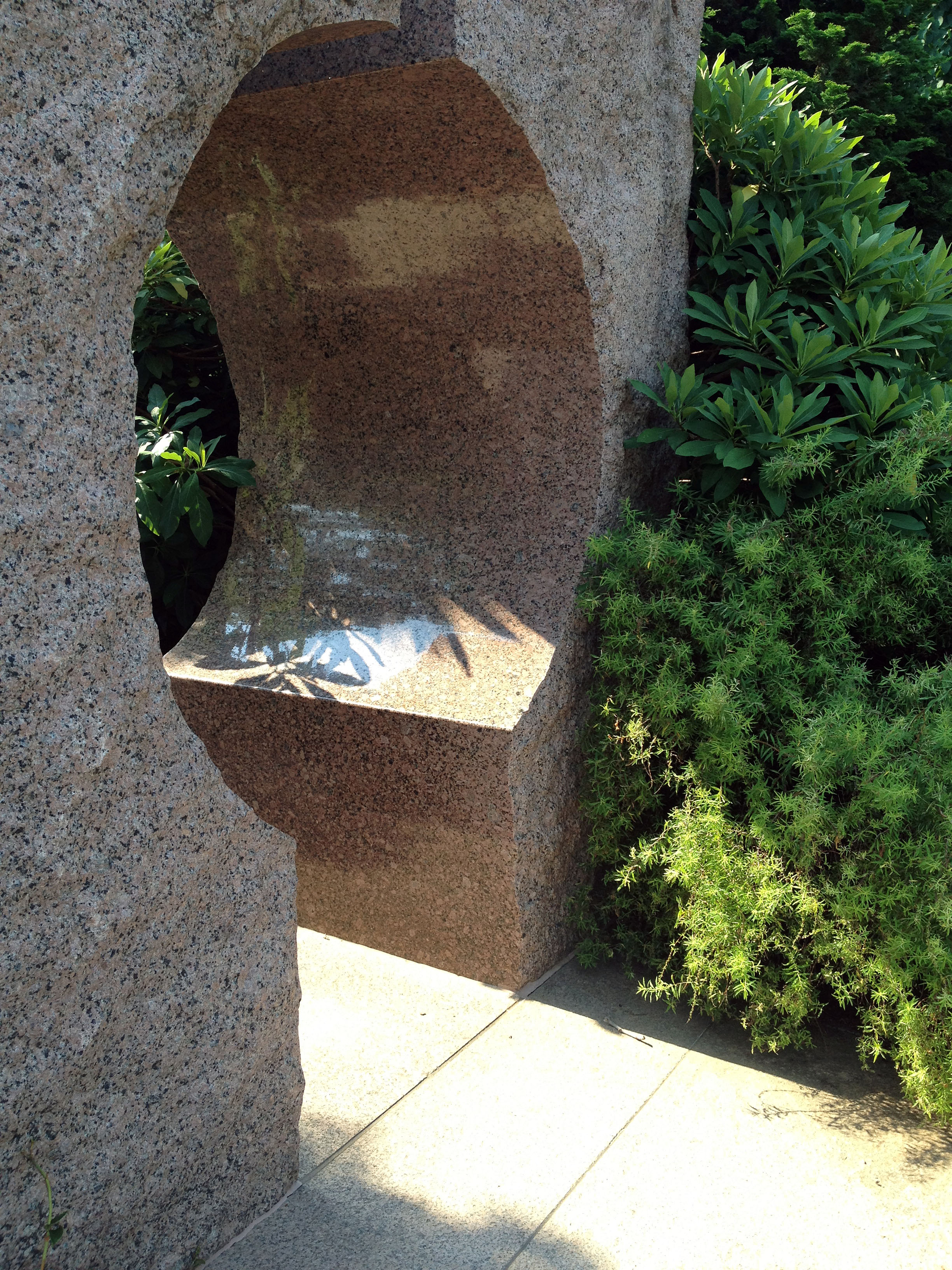
Haupt garden Moongate

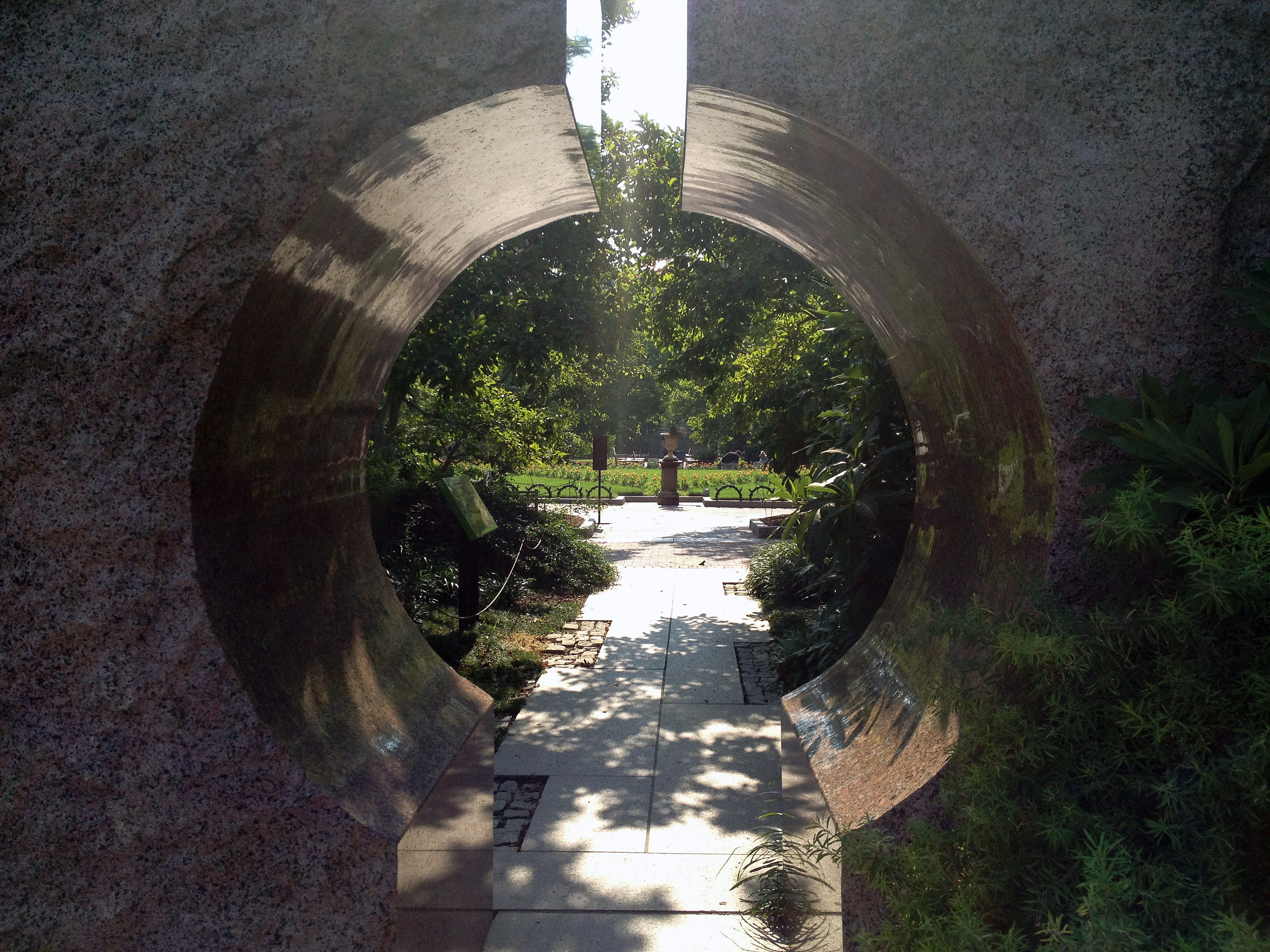
Haupt garden Moongate

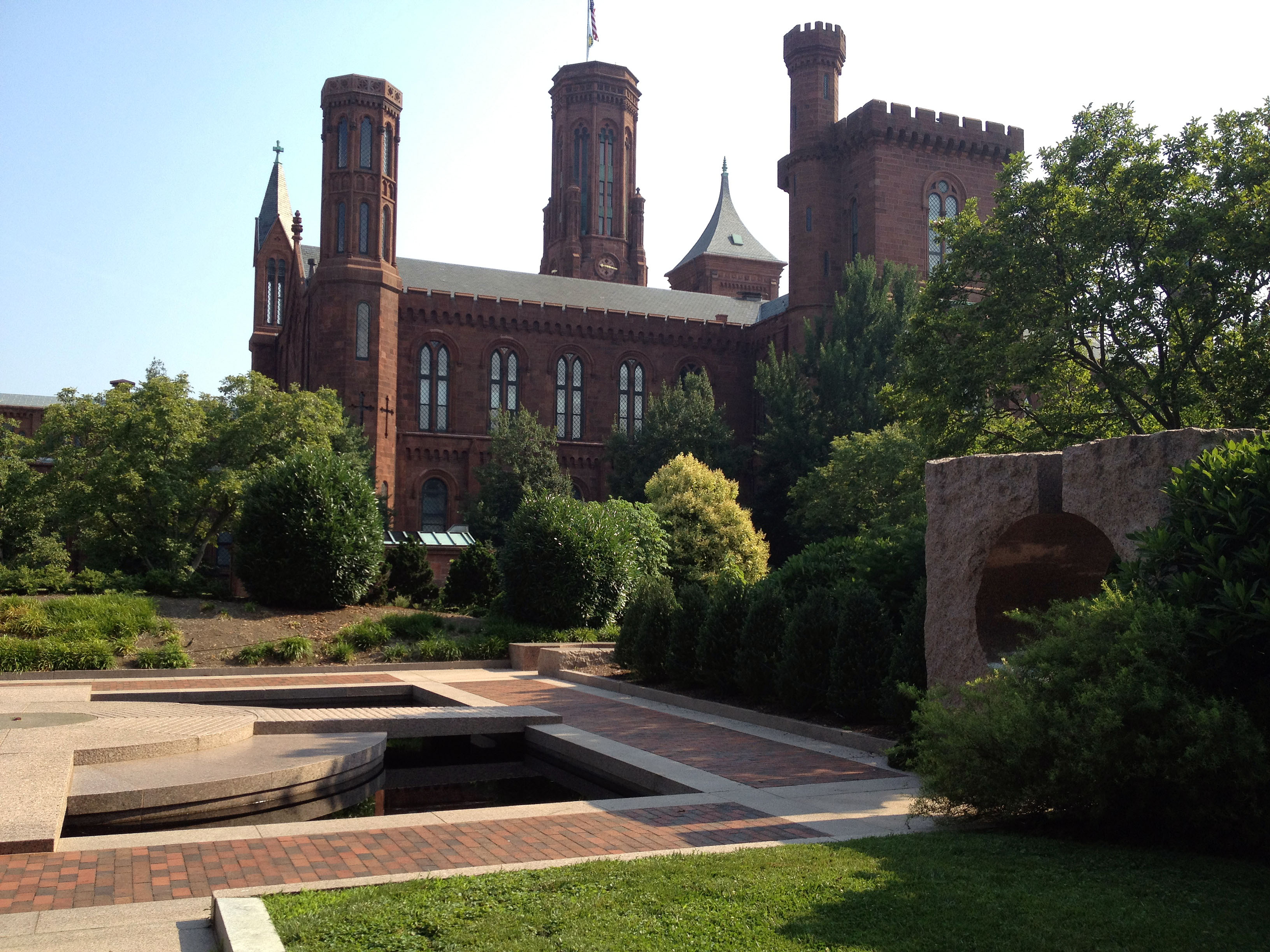
Haupt garden Moongate garden and Castle

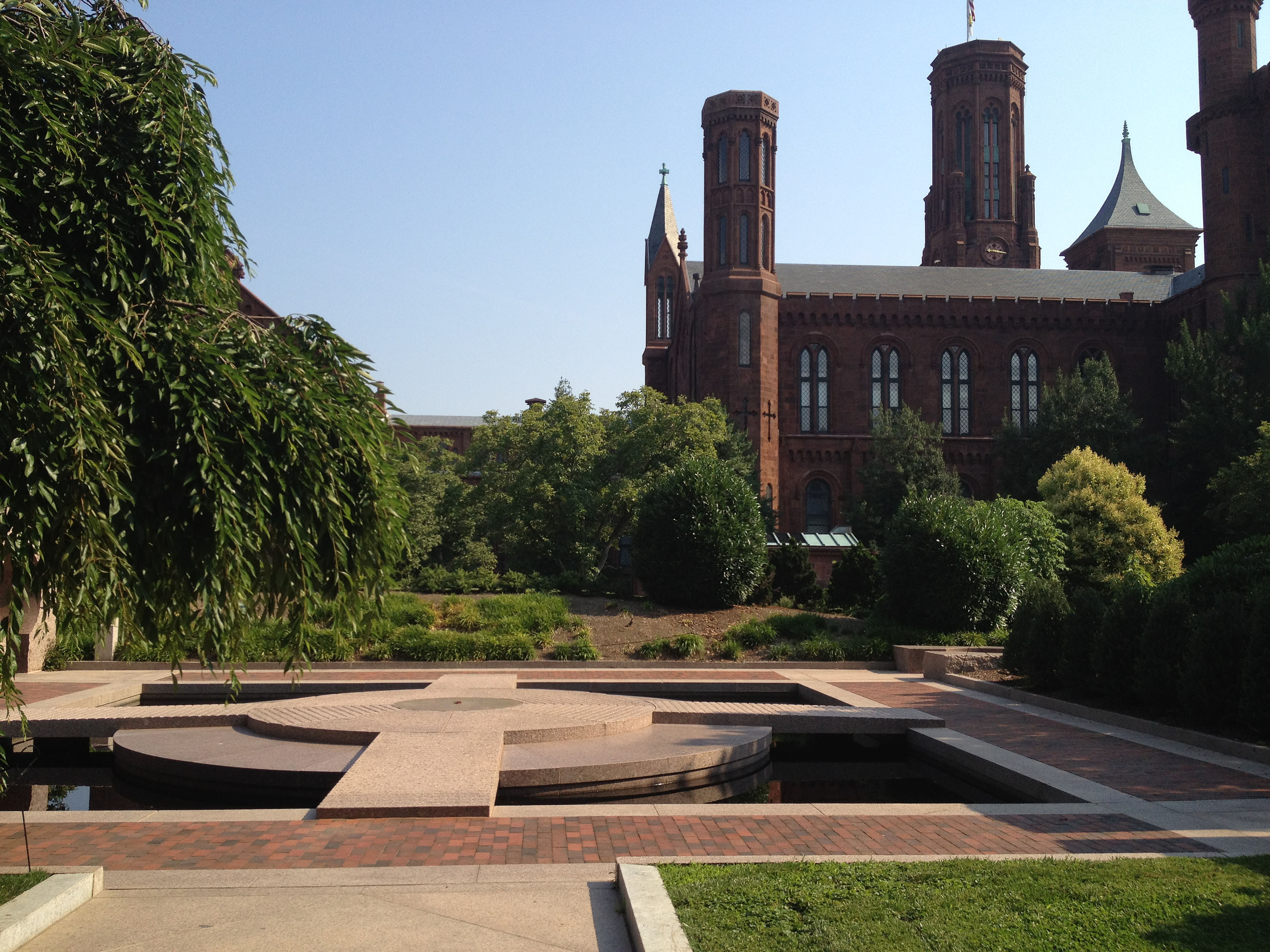
Haupt garden Moongate pool and Castle

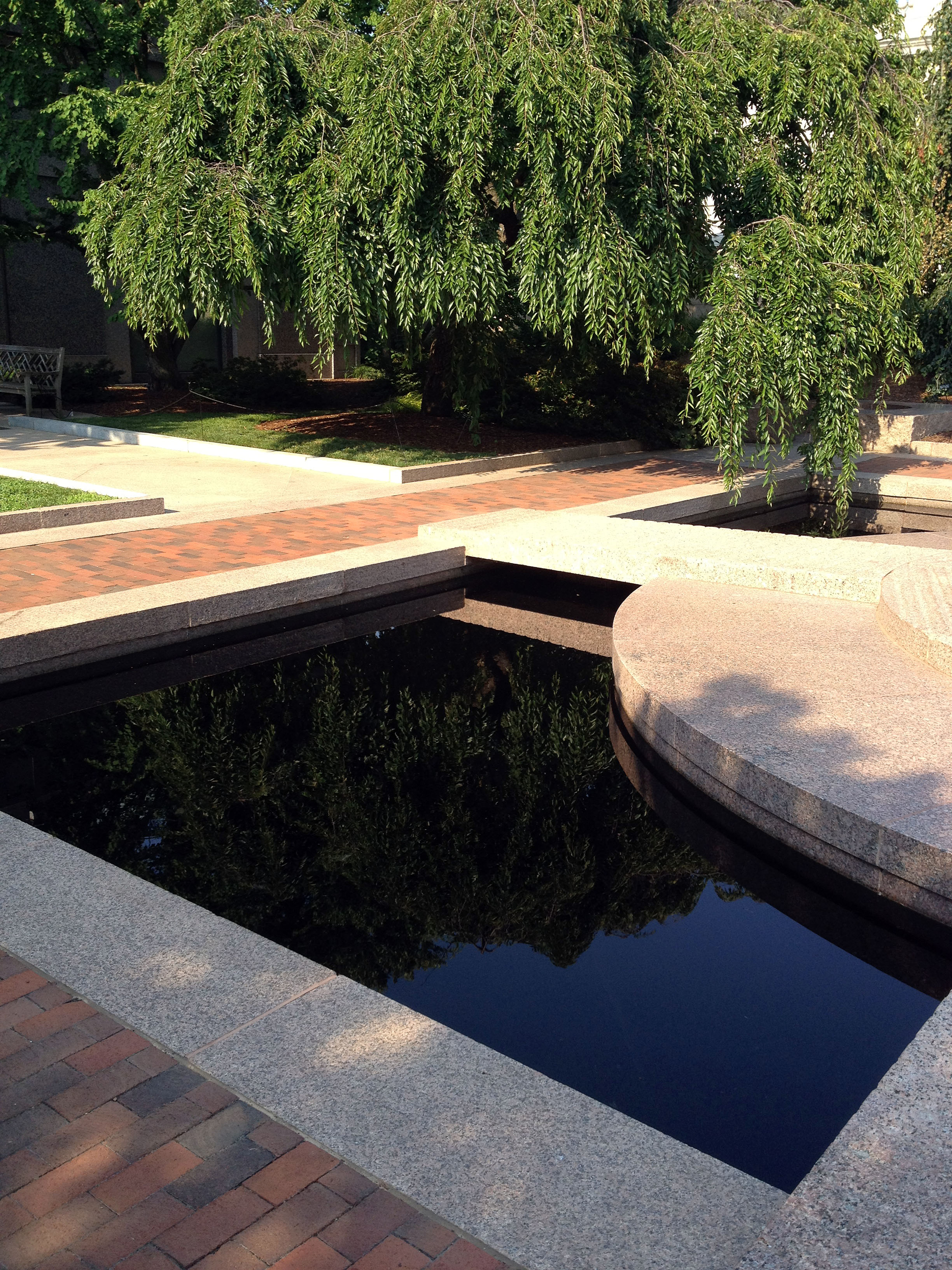
Haupt garden Moongate pool

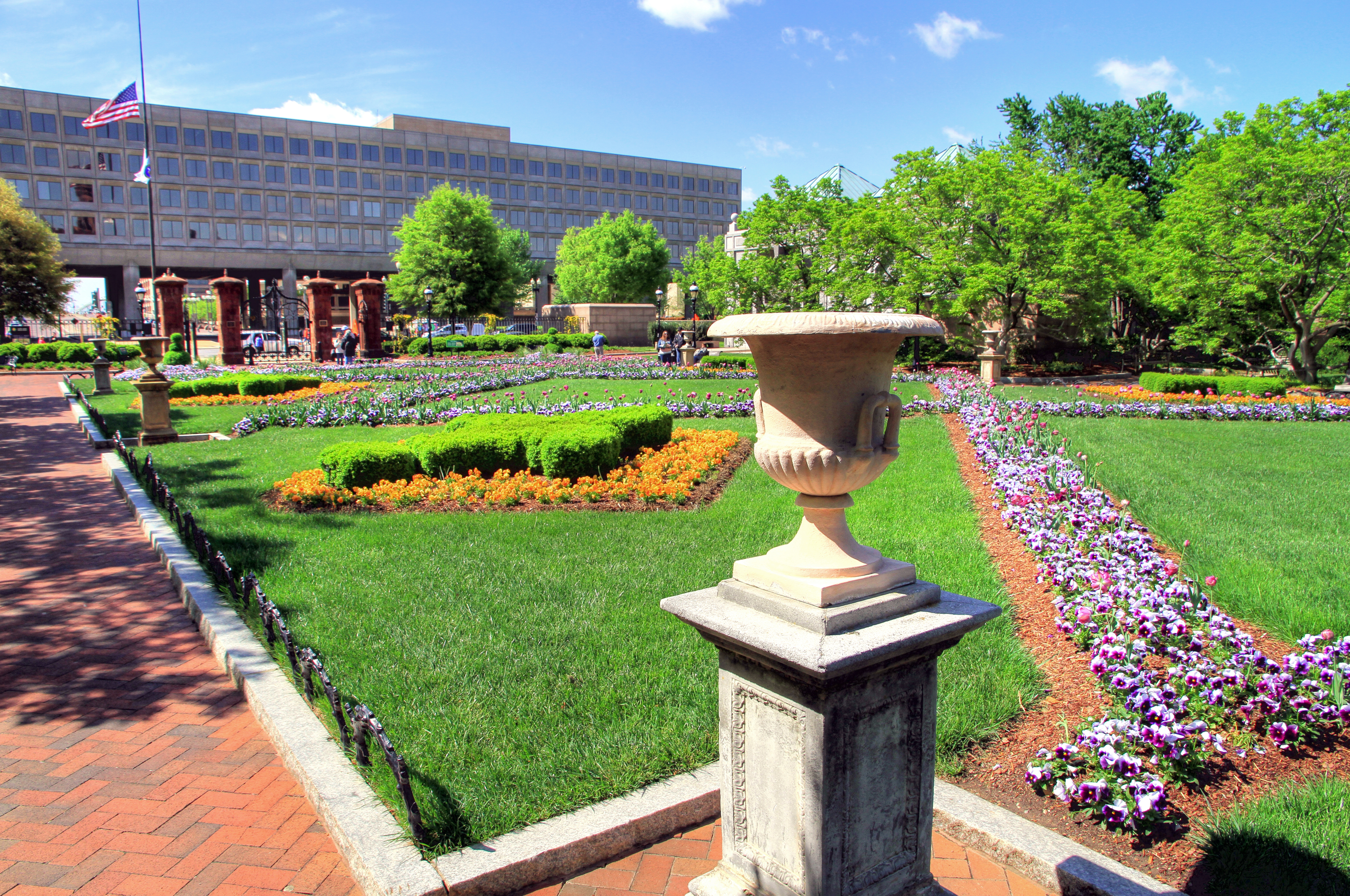
Andrew Jackson Downing Urn in the Enid A. Haupt Garden

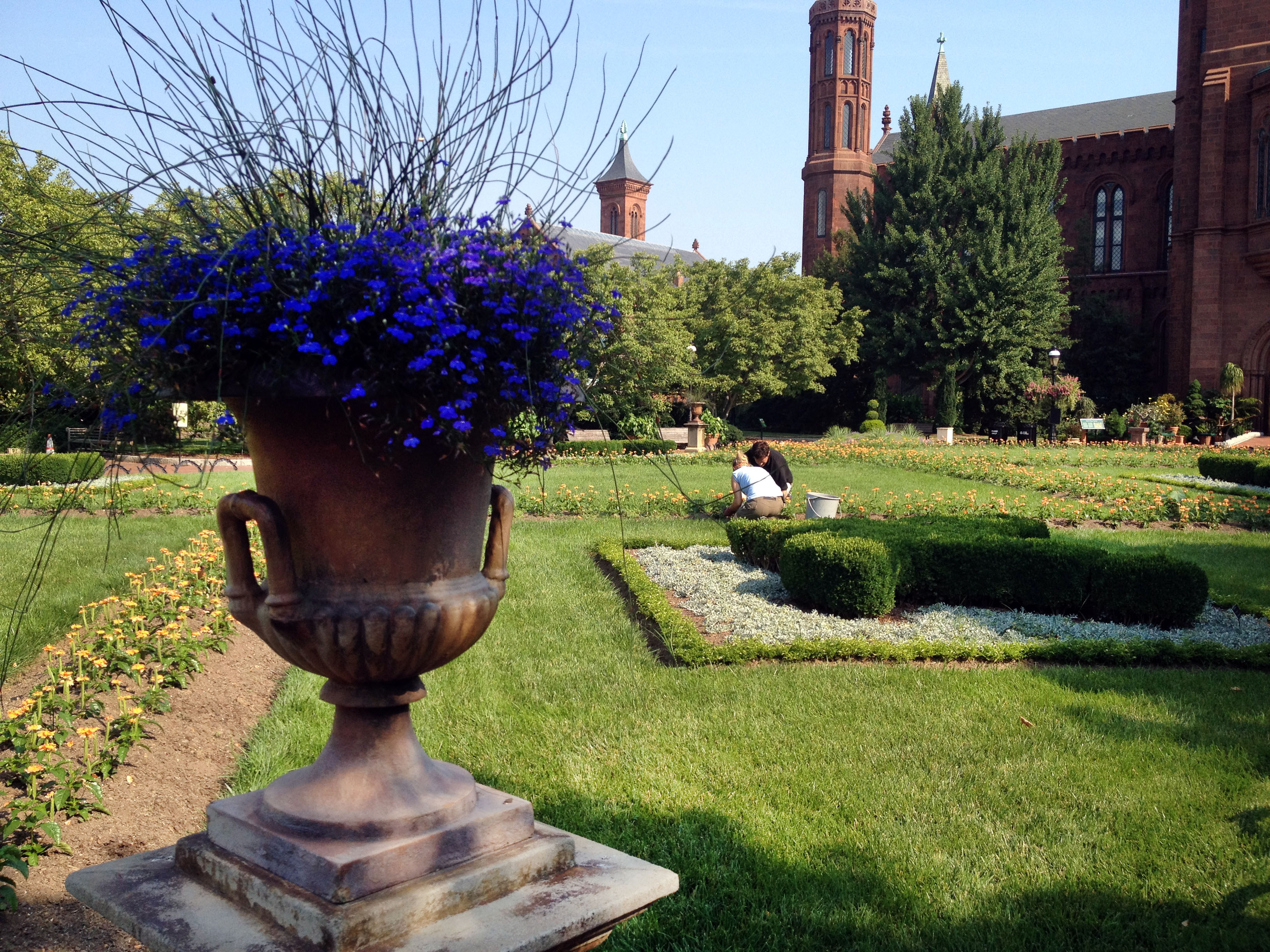
Andrew Jackson Downing Urn and parterre

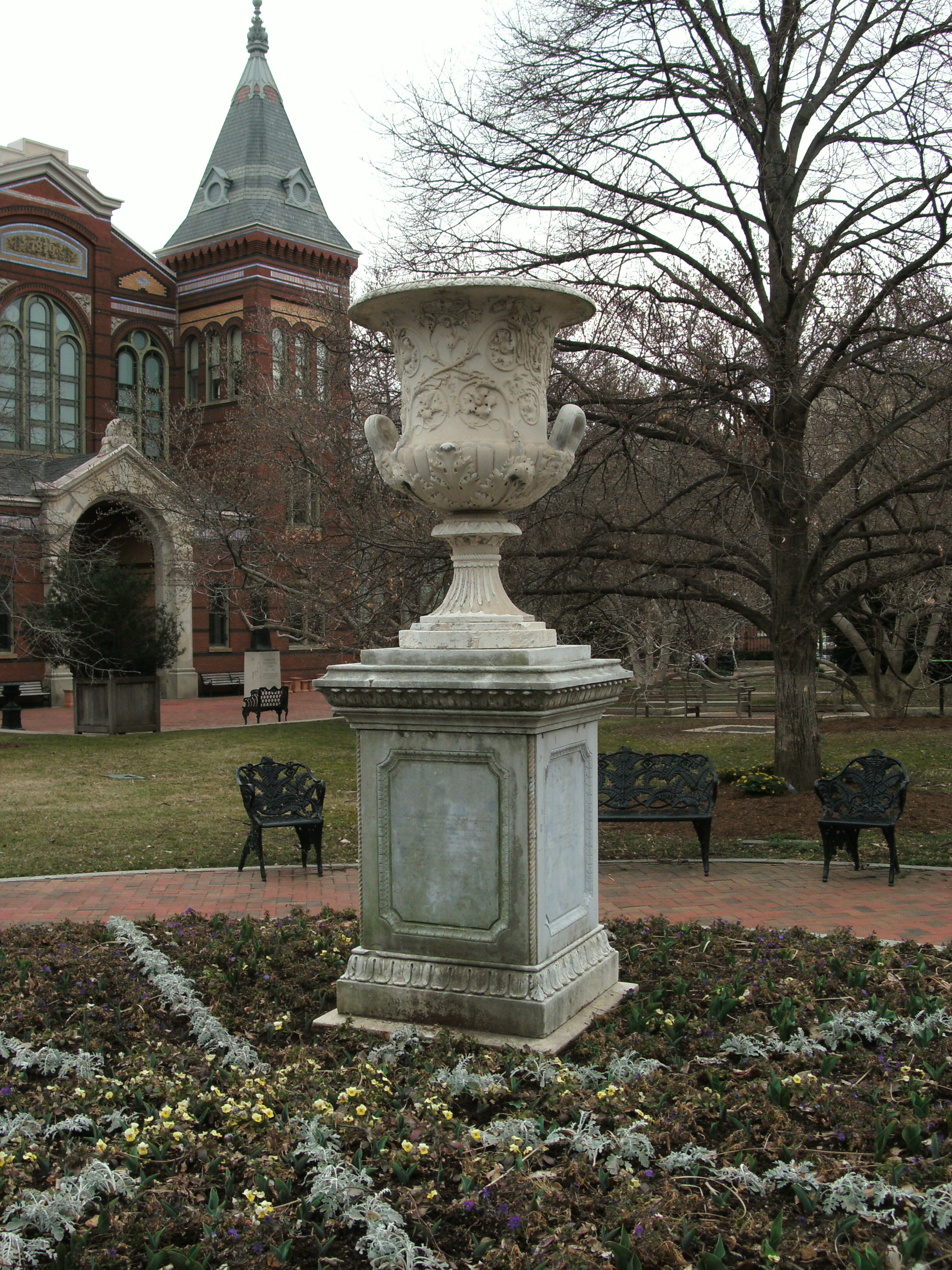
Andrew Jackson Downing Urn and the Smithsonian Institution's Arts and Industries Building
