= Mary Livingston Ripley =

Horticulturist and scientific collector (1914–1996)

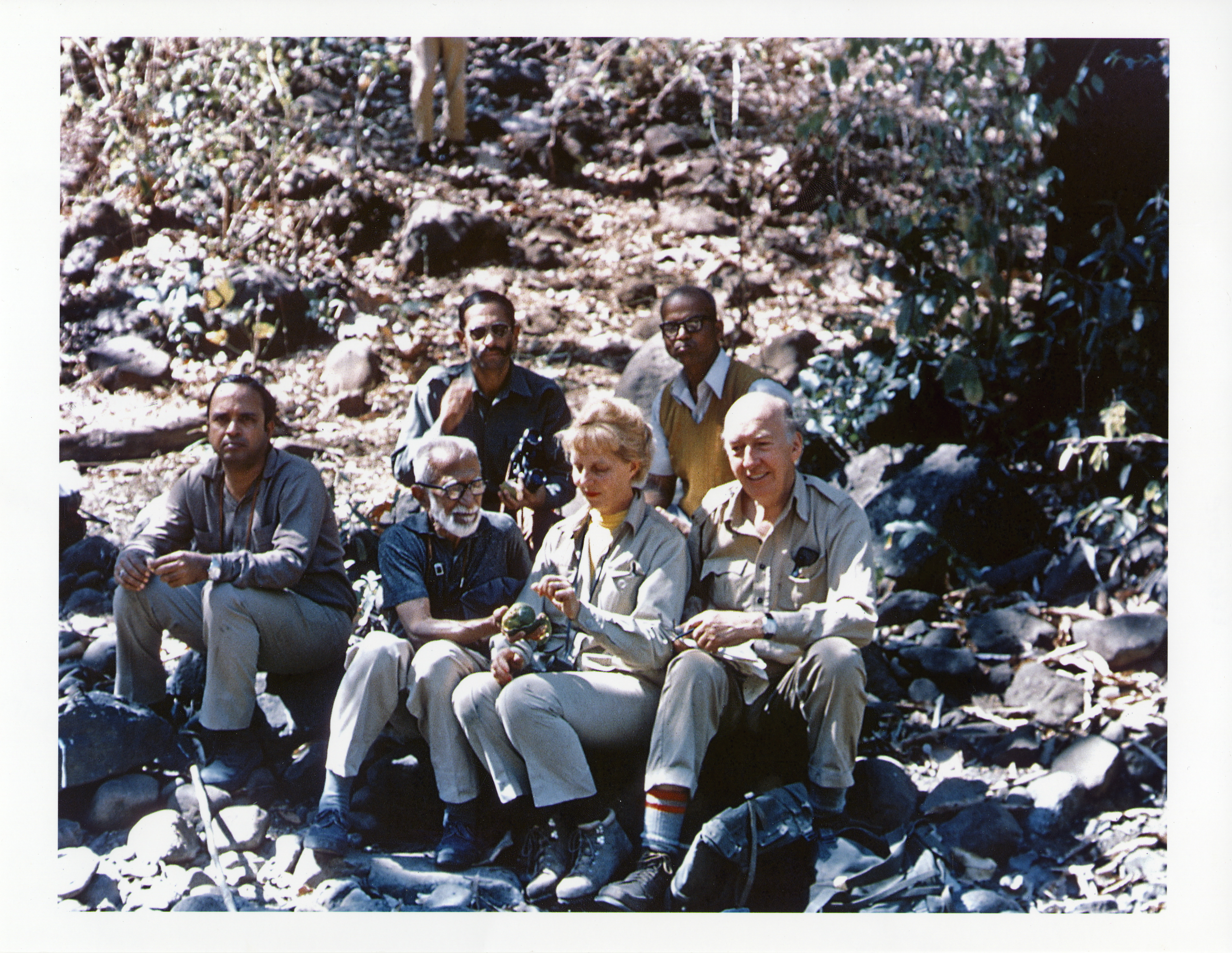
- Mary and Dillon Ripley (front row, right), 1976 in India
- Born: Mary Moncrieffe Livingston; May 11, 1914; New York City, New York, U.S.
- Died: April 15, 1996 (aged 81); Litchfield, Connecticut, U.S.
- Spouse: Sidney Dillon Ripley (m. 1949)
- Children: 3
- Parents: Gerald Moncrieffe Livingston (father); Eleanor Hoffman Rodewald Livingston (mother)

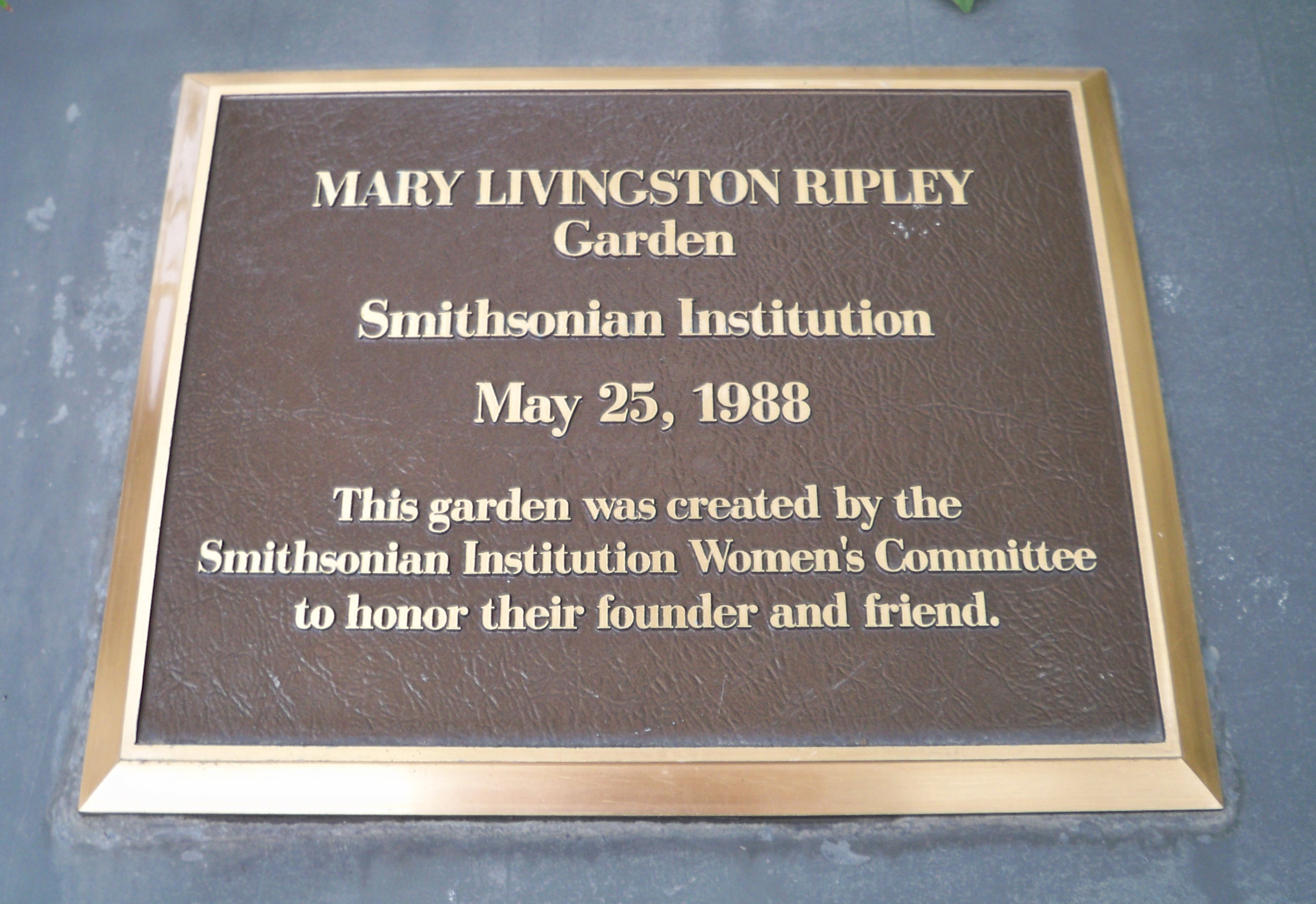
Memorial plaque in the Smithsonian Gardens.

Mary Moncrieffe Livingston Ripley (May 11, 1914 – April 15, 1996) was a U.S. horticulturist, entomologist, photographer, and scientific collector.

== Early life ==
Mary Livingston was born in New York City in 1914. She was the daughter of Gerald Moncrieffe Livingston, a governor of the New York Stock Exchange, and Eleanor Hoffman (née Rodewald) Livingston. Through her father, she was a member of the long prominent Livingston family. Her sisters were Mrs. Livingston Briggs and Geraldine Livingston.

Her paternal grandfather was Crawford Livingston and her maternal grandfather was William MacNeil Rodewald of Tuxedo Park, New York. Her great-grandfather was the Rev. Dr. Charles Frederick Hoffman.

== Career ==
She worked in a clerical position for the Office of Strategic Services during World War II. While traveling with the OSS, she was a roommate of Julia Child (then Julia McWilliams).

After she married, she accompanied her husband on ornithological and entomological expeditions to India, Bhutan, Indonesia and Irian Jaya. Ripley's work of organizing volunteers led to the creation of the Smithsonian Institutions Women's Committee.

In 1983, Ripley was made an Honorary life member of the Smithsonian's Women's Committee.

== Personal life ==
Mary, a member of the Colony Club and the Colonial Lords of the Manors and the Colonial Dames of America, was first married to Spencer F. Eddy Jr., son of diplomat Spencer F. Eddy, before their divorce in 1935. While stationed in Sri Lanka (then known as Ceylon) and working for the OSS, she met Sidney Dillon Ripley. They married in 1949, and were the parents of three daughters:Julie Dillon Miller, Rosemary L. Ripley, and Sylvia McNeill Addison.

Ripley died in Litchfield, Connecticut on April 15, 1996. The Mary Livingston Ripley Garden, part of the Smithsonian Gardens, is named after her.
