= The Chimneys (Fredericksburg, Virginia) =

Historic house in Virginia, United States

- U.S. National Register of Historic Places
- Virginia Landmarks Register
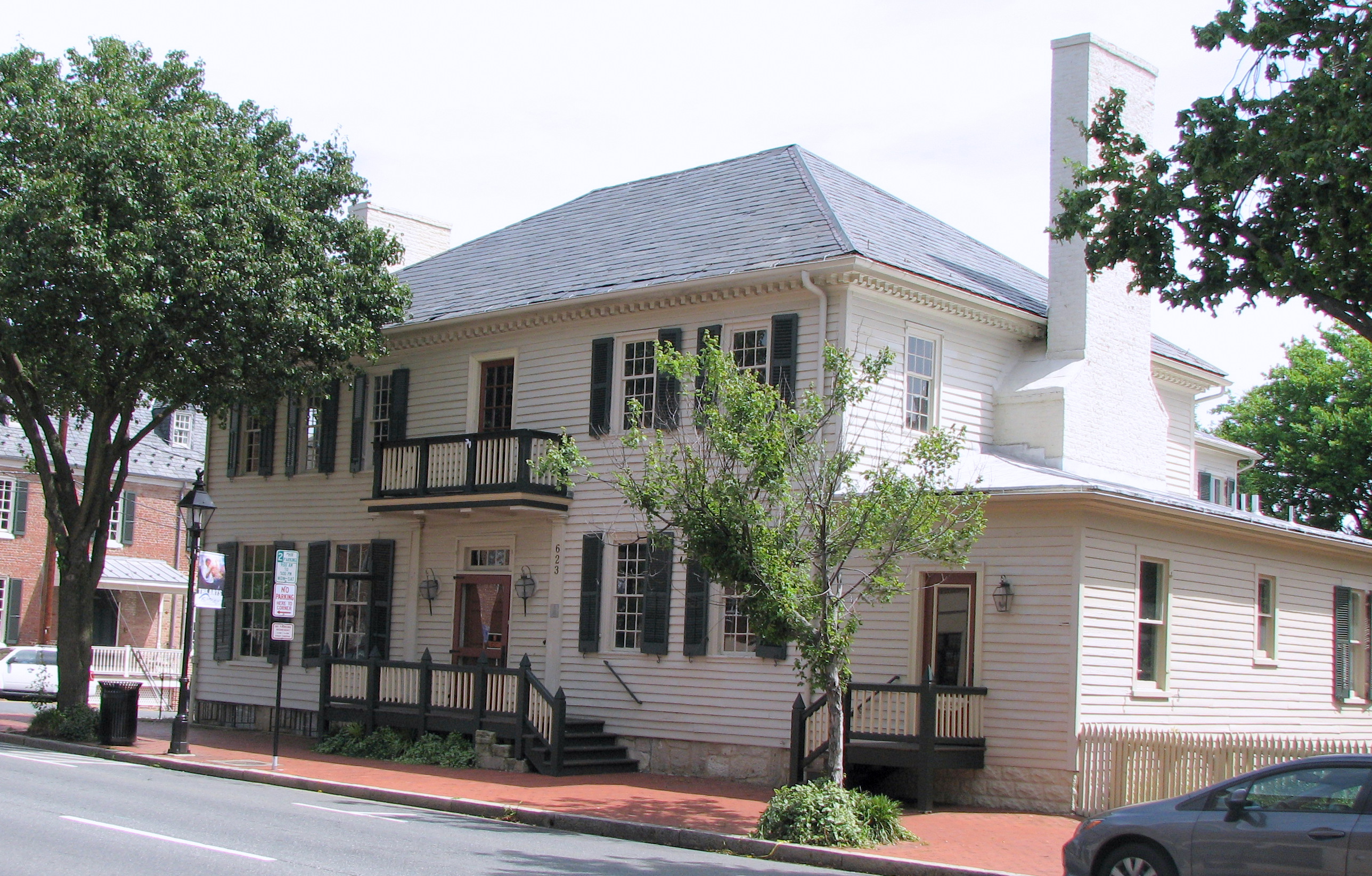
- The Chimneys (1771) in Fredericksburg, Virginia

- Location within Northern Virginia Location within Virginia Location within the United States
- Location: 623 Caroline St., Fredericksburg, Virginia
- Coordinates: 38°18′1″N 77°27′28″W
- Area: less than one acre
- Built: 1771
- Architectural style: Georgian
- NRHP reference No.: 75002109
- VLR No.: 111-0015

Significant dates
- Added to NRHP: April 3, 1975
- Designated VLR: December 17, 1974

The Chimneys is a historic house located in Fredericksburg, Virginia. The house was constructed around 1771–1773. The house is named because of the stone chimneys at each end. The Georgian home was added to the National Register of Historic Places in April 1975. Of note are the interior decorative woodwork in the moldings, millwork, paneling indicative of building styles of the period. The decorative carving on the mantelpiece as well as on the door and window frames is particularly significant.

== Design and construction ==
The Chimneys' floor plan has two rooms on each side of a central hall. The two-story house is framed with heavy timber with mortise and tenon joints secured with hardwood pegs. Each timber is marked by chiseled Roman numerals. Spaces between wall studs are nogged with brick in the interior and exterior walls. Fredericksburg was a major port city in the colonies in the mid- to late 18th century and The Chimneys' hipped roof framing utilizes techniques common in the construction of ships' hulls at the time. The roof is supported by three heavy king post trusses.

== History ==
It is uncertain who originally owned The Chimneys. John Glassell (1731–1806), a local merchant, is usually noted as the builder. Glassell came from Galloway, Scotland in the 1770s and purchased land in Fredericksburg from Charles Yates. Researchers at the University of Mary Washington in Fredericksburg suggest that the house was built by Yates prior to the purchase by Glassell.

During the American Revolution, John Glassell was a loyalist. He went to Scotland in 1775 and never returned. Ownership of The Chimneys passed to William Glassell to whom John Glassell had given power of attorney. An insurance policy written in 1792 showed William as the owner.

In the 1800s, the house was bought and sold many times. One famous resident was Ellen Lewis Herndon "Nell" Arthur (1837–1880), later the wife of U.S. President Chester A. Arthur, who lived at The Chimneys as a child. The house was purchased in 1966 by the president of the Historic Fredericksburg Foundation and, for a time, the house was rented for income. In 1975 the Foundation moved its museum and offices into The Chimneys.

After William Vakos purchased and renovated it in 1982, the building was sold to Robert Mitchell III in 1985. In 2000, ownership passed to Tommy Mitchell (no relation), the current owner. A succession restaurants have operated out of the property since its renovation.

== Renovation ==
In 1982, the Historic Fredericksburg Foundation sold The Chimneys to William Vakos, who secured permission from Fredericksburg's Architectural Review Board and Zoning Board to create a restaurant in the building. During the renovation, the structure's weatherboarding was repainted in the original colors and porches were added at the rear of the building as well as in the front of the building where a 2-story porch was built. A veranda overlooking an English garden was added. Plumbing, electrical systems, and heating were also replaced. Prior to reconstruction, all changes were approved by the Historic Fredericksburg Foundation
