= Mary Hilson =

British researcher

Mary Hilson is a British researcher at the School of European Languages, Culture and Society and at the Department of Scandinavian Studies, University College London. She generally focuses on modern Nordic societies. She has also written several books.

== Early life ==
Hilson was educated at the University of Exeter, receiving a PhD in Economic and Social History, and at Uppsala University.

== Career ==
Hilson was a visiting researcher at the Centre for Nordic Studies (Renvall Institute, Helsinki University).

== Bibliography ==
- The Nordic Model: Scandinavia since 1945 (2008)
- Political Change and the Rise of Labour in Comparative Perspective: Britain and Sweden 1890-1920 (2006)
