= Mary Siezgle =

Union Army soldier in the American Civil War

Mary Siezgle was a soldier of the Union Army in the American Civil War. Her service began as a nurse, but she joined her husband in the 44th New York Infantry disguised as a man. She was one of five women who are known to have participated as a combatant in the Battle of Gettysburg.

== Legacy ==
In 1915, the New York Times published an article about the service of Siezgle.
