= Mary L. Behrens =

Wyoming politician

Member of the Wyoming House of Representatives from the Natrona district
- In office 1987–1988

Personal details
- Party: Republican

Mary L. Behrens is an American Republican politician from Casper, Wyoming. She represented the Natrona district in the Wyoming House of Representatives from 1987 to 1988.
