= List of women scientists in the 20th century =

Women in science from 190 1 to 2000 A.D

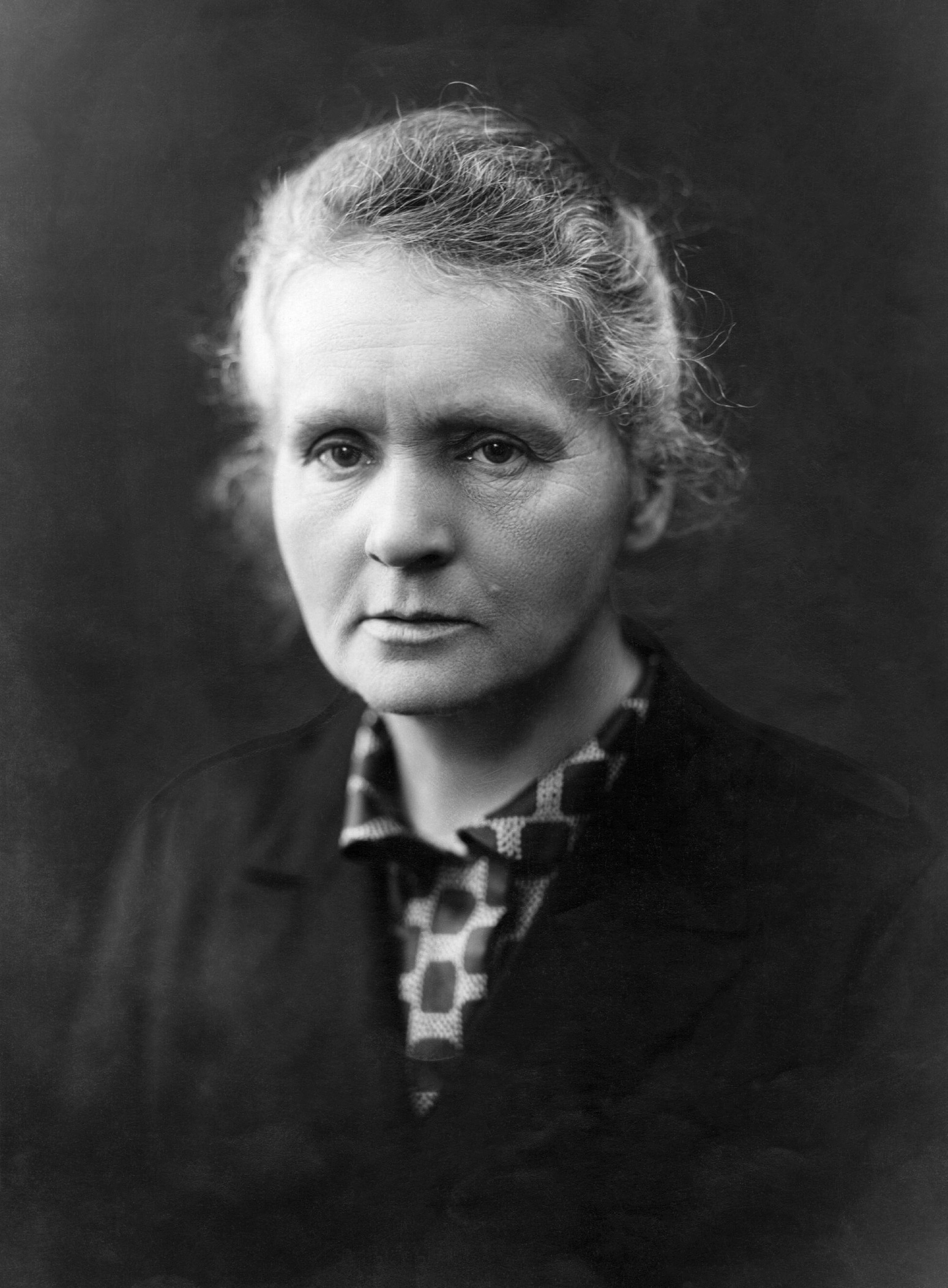
Maria Skłodowska-Curie, 1867–1934, two time Nobel Laureate

This is a historical list dealing with women scientists in the 20th century. During this time period, women working in scientific fields were rare. Women at this time faced barriers in higher education and often denied access to scientific institutions; in the Western world, the first-wave feminist movement began to break down many of these barriers.

== Anthropology ==
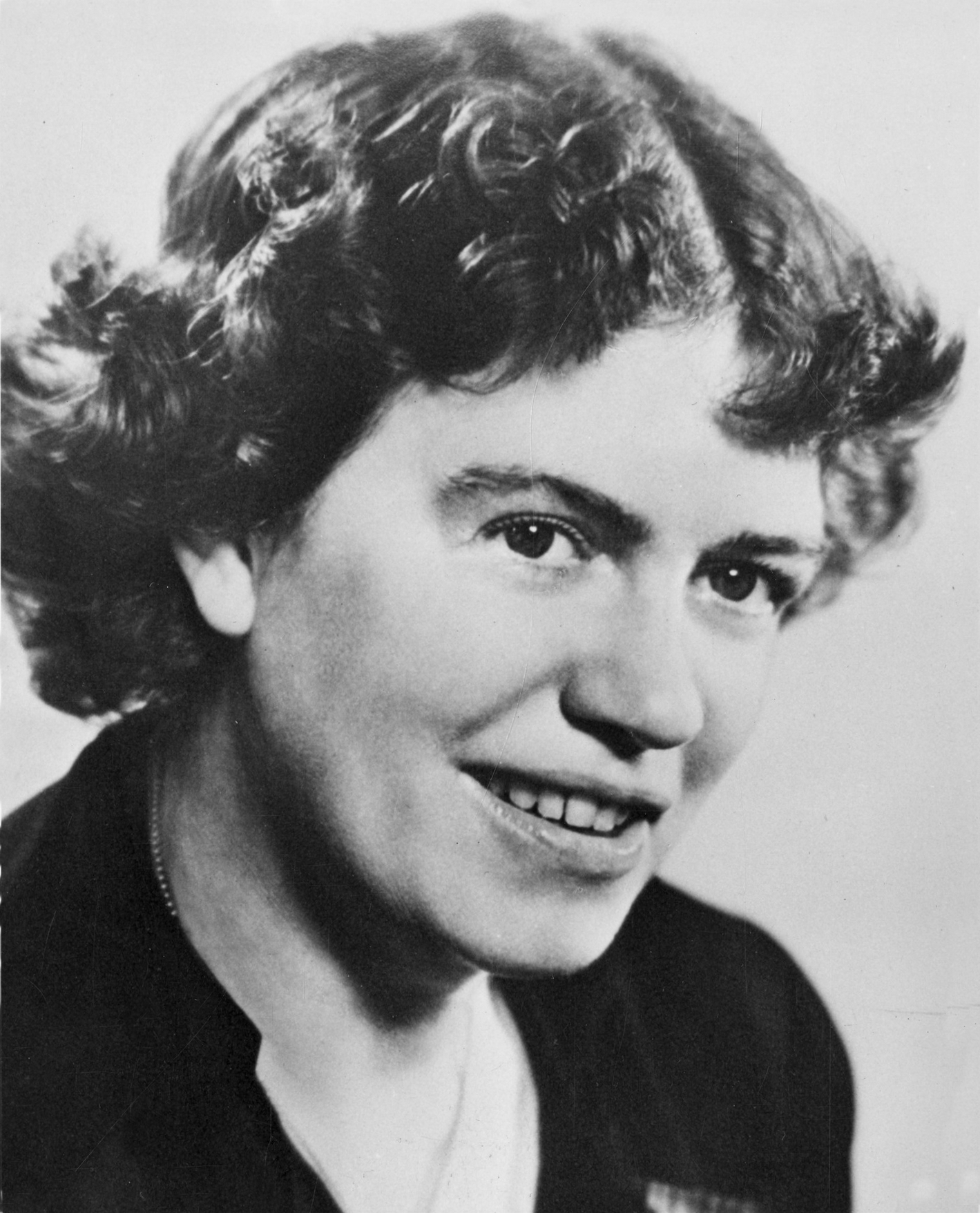
Margaret Mead

- Heloísa Alberto Torres (1895–1977), Brazilian anthropologist and museum director
- Katharine Bartlett (1907–2001), American physical anthropologist, museum curator
- Ruth Benedict (1887–1948), American anthropologist
- Anna Bērzkalne (1891–1956), Latvian folklorist and ethnographer
- Alicia Dussán de Reichel (1920–2023), Colombian anthropologist
- Dina Dahbany-Miraglia (born 1938), American Yemini linguistic anthropologist, educator
- Bertha P. Dutton (1903–1994), anthropologist and ethnologist
- Phebe Fjellström (1924–2007), Swedish ethnologist
- Helen Groger-Wurm (1921–2005), Austrian-born Australian ethnologist
- Zora Neale Hurston (1891–1960), American folklorist and anthropologist
- Nadine Ivanitzky (1874–1919) Ukrainian (Soviet) sociologist and cultural anthropologist
- Marjorie F. Lambert (1908–2006), American archeologist and anthropologist who studied Southwestern Puebloan peoples
- Dorothea Leighton (1908–1989), American social psychiatrist, founded the field of medical anthropology
- Katharine Luomala (1907–1992), American anthropologist
- Margaret McArthur (1919–2002), Australian anthropologist, nutritionist and educator
- Margaret Mead (1901–1978), American anthropologist
- Grete Mostny (1914–1991), Austrian-born-Chilean anthropologist and archaeologist
- Miriam Tildesley (1883–1979), British anthropologist
- Mildred Trotter (1899–1991), American forensic anthropologist
- Camilla Wedgwood (1901–1955), British/Australian anthropologist
- Alba Zaluar (1942–2019), Brazilian anthropologist specializing in urban anthropology

== Archaeology ==
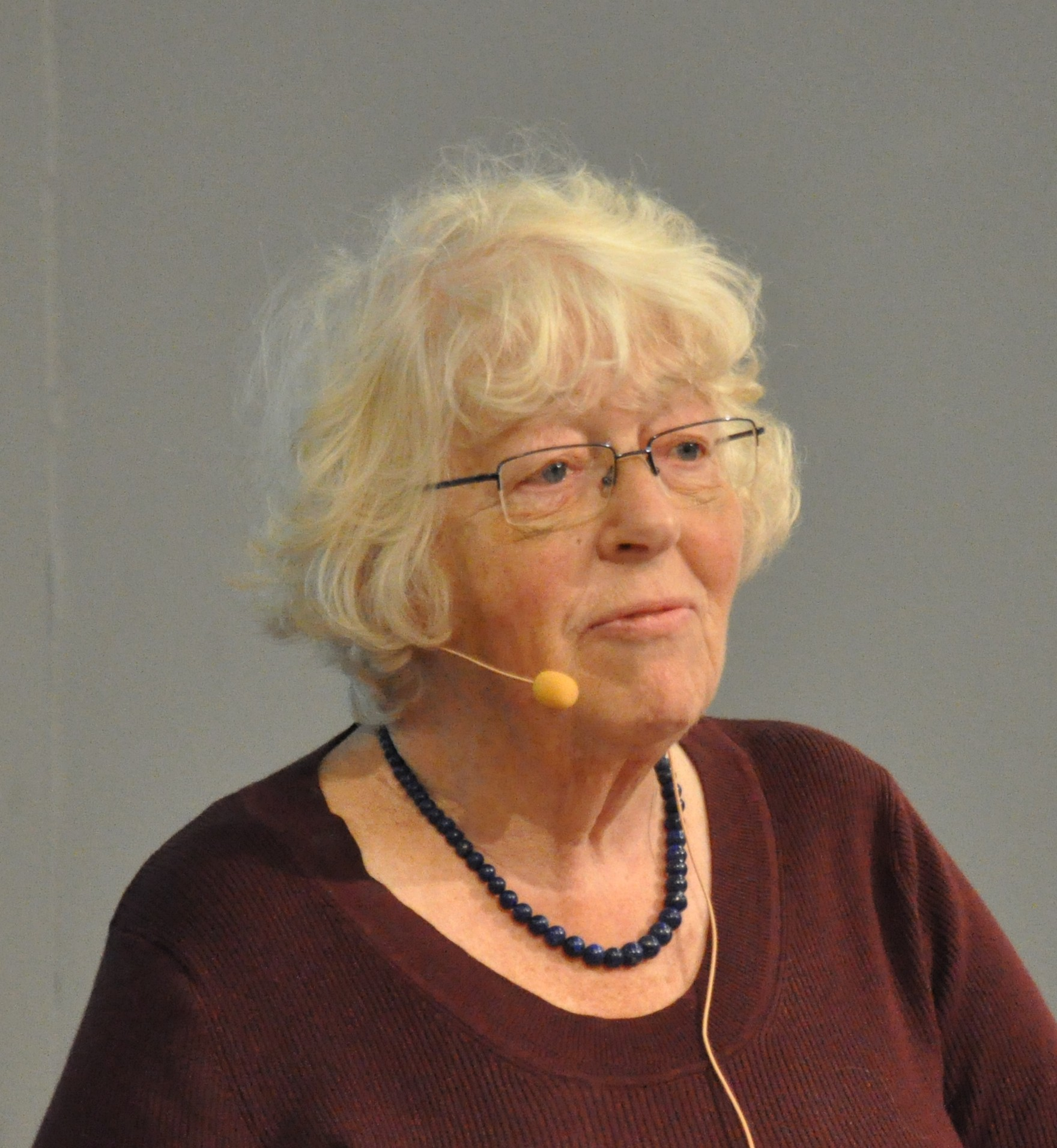
Birgit Arrhenius

- Sonia Alconini (born 1965), Bolivian archaeologist of the Formative Period of the Lake Titicaca basin
- Birgit Arrhenius (1932–2023), Swedish archaeologist
- Dorothea Bate (1878–1951), British archaeologist and pioneer of archaeozoology
- Alex Bayliss British archaeologist
- Crystal Bennett (1918–1987), British archaeologist whose research focused on Jordan
- Zeineb Benzina Tunisian archeologist
- Jole Bovio Marconi (1897–1986), Italian archaeologist and prehistorian
- Juliet Clutton-Brock (1933–2015), British zooarchaeologist who specialized in domestic animals
- Dorothy Charlesworth (1927–1981), British archaeologist and expert on Roman glass
- Lily Chitty (1893–1979), British archaeologist who specialized in the prehistoric history of Wales and the west of England
- Mary Kitson Clark (1905–2005), British archaeologist best known for her work on the Roman-British in Northern England
- Bryony Coles (born 1946), British prehistoric archaeologist
- Alana Cordy-Collins (1944–2015), American archaeologist specializing in Peruvian prehistory
- Rosemary Cramp (1929–2023), British archaeologist whose research focuses on Anglo-Saxons in Britain
- Joan Breton Connelly American classical archaeologist
- Margaret Conkey (born 1943), American archaeologist
- Hester A. Davis (1930–2014), American archaeologist who was instrumental in establishing public policy and ethical standards
- Frederica de Laguna (1906–2004), American archaeologist best known for her work on the archaeology of the Pacific Northwest and Alaska
- Kelly Dixon, American archaeologist specializing in the American West
- Janette Deacon (born 1939), South African archaeologist specializing in rock art conservation
- Elizabeth Eames (1918–2008), British archaeologist who was an expert on medieval tiles
- Anabel Ford (born 1951), American archaeologist
- Aileen Fox (1907–2005), British archaeologist known excavating prehistoric and Roman sites throughout the United Kingdom
- Alison Frantz (1903–1995), American archaeological photographer and Byzantine scholar
- Honor Frost (1917–2010), Turkish archaeologist who specialized in underwater archaeology
- Perla Fuscaldo (born 1941), Argentine egyptologist
- Elizabeth Baldwin Garland (1930–2020), American archaeologist
- Kathleen K. Gilmore (1914–2010), American archaeologist known for her research in Spanish colonial archaeology
- Dorothy Garrod (1892–1968), British archaeologist who specialized in the Palaeolithic period
- Roberta Gilchrist (born 1965), Canadian archaeologist specializing in medieval Britain
- Marija Gimbutas (1921–1994), Lithuanian archaeologist (Kurgan hypothesis)
- Hetty Goldman (1881–1972), American archaeologist and one of the first female archaeologists to conduct excavations in the Middle East and Greece
- Niède Guidon (born 1933), Brazilian archaeologist
- Audrey Henshall (1927–2021), British archaeologist and prehistorian
- Corinne Hofman (born 1959), Dutch archaeologist
- Cynthia Irwin-Williams (1936–1990), American archaeologist of the prehistoric Southwest
- Wilhelmina Feemster Jashemski (1910–2007), American archaeologist who specialized in the ancient site of Pompei
- Margaret Ursula Jones (1916–2001), British archaeologist best known for directing Britain's largest archaeological excavation at Mucking, Essex
- Rosemary Joyce (born 1956), American archaeologist who uncovered chocolate's archaeological record and studies Honduran pre-history
- Kathleen Kenyon (1906–1978), British archaeologist known for her research on the Neolothic culture in Egypt and Mesopotamia
- Alice Kober (1906–1950), American classical archaeologist best known for her research that led to the deciphering of Linear B
- Kristina Killgrove (born 1977), American bioarchaeologist
- Winifred Lamb (1894–1963), British archaeologist
- Mary Leakey (1913–1996), British archaeologist known for discovering Proconsul remains which are now believed to be human's ancestor
- Liu Li (born 1953), Chinese-American archaeologist specializing in Neolithic and Bronze Age China
- Anna Marguerite McCann (1933–2017), American archaeologist known for her work in underwater archaeology
- Isabel McBryde (born 1934), Australian archaeologist
- Betty Meehan (born 1933), Australian anthropologist and archaeologist
- Audrey Meaney (1931–2021), British archaeologist and expert on Anglo-Saxon England
- Margaret Murray (1863–1963), British-Indian Egyptologist and the first woman to be appointed a lecturer in archaeology in the United Kingdom
- Bertha Parker Pallan (1907–1978), American archaeologist known for being the first female Native American archaeologist
- Tatiana Proskouriakoff (1909–1985), Russian-American archaeologist who contributed significantly to deciphering the Maya hieroglyphs
- Charlotte Roberts (born 1957), British bioarchaeologist
- Margaret Rule (1928–2015), British archaeologist led the excavation of the Tudor Warship Mary Rose
- Elisabeth Ruttkay (1926–2009), Austrian Neolithic and Bronze Age specialist
- Hanna Rydh (1891–1964), Swedish archaeologist and prehistorian
- Elizabeth Slater (1946–2014), British archaeologist who specialized in archaeometallurgy
- Julie K. Stein, Researches prehistoric humans in the Pacific Northwest
- Hoang Thi Than (born 1944), Vietnamese geological engineer and archaeologist
- Birgitta Wallace (born 1944), Swedish–Canadian archaeologist whose research focuses on Norse migration to North America
- Zheng Zhenxiang (1929–2024), Chinese archaeologist and Bronze Age specialist

== Astronomy ==
- Claudia Alexander (1959–2015), American planetary scientist
- Beatriz Barbuy (born 1950) Brazilian astrophysicist
- Mary Adela Blagg (1858–1944), British astronomer
- Bohumila Bednářová (1904–1985), Czech astronomer
- Mary Brück (1925–2008), Irish astronomer, astrophysicist, science historian
- Margaret Burbidge (1919–2020), British astrophysicist
- Jocelyn Bell Burnell (born 1943), Northern Irish-British astrophysicist
- Annie Jump Cannon (1863–1941), American astronomer
- Janine Connes (1926–2024), French astronomer
- A. Grace Cook (1887–1958), British astronomer
- Heather Couper (1949–2020), British astronomer (astronomy popularisation, science education)
- Joy Crisp, American planetary scientist
- Nancy Crooker (born 1944), American space physicist
- Suzanne Débarbat (1928–2024), French astronomer and historian
- Sandra Faber (born 1944), American astronomer
- Joan Feynman (1927–2020), American space physicist
- Pamela Gay (born 1973), American astronomer
- Vera Fedorovna Gaze (1899–1954), Russian astronomer (planet 2388 Gase and Gaze Crater on Venus are named for her)
- Julie Vinter Hansen (1890–1960), Danish astronomer
- Martha Haynes (born 1951), American astronomer
- Lisa Kaltenegger (born 1977), Austrian/American astronomer
- Dorothea Klumpke (1861–1942), American-born astronomer
- Henrietta Leavitt (1868–1921), American astronomer (periodicity of variable stars)
- Evelyn Leland (c.1870–c.1930), American astronomer working at the Harvard College Observatory
- Priyamvada Natarajan (born 1969), Indian/American astrophysicist
- Carolyn Porco (born 1953), American planetary scientist
- Cecilia Payne-Gaposchkin (1900–1978), British-American astronomer
- Ruby Payne-Scott (1912–1981), Australian radio astronomer
- Vera Rubin (1928–2016), American astronomer
- Charlotte Moore Sitterly (1898–1990), American astronomer
- Jill Tarter (born 1944), American astronomer
- Beatrice Tinsley (1941–1981), New-Zealand astronomer and cosmologist
- Mirjana Vukićević-Karabin (1933–2020), Serbian astrophysicist
- Maria Wähnl (1908–1989), Austrian astronomer

== Biology ==
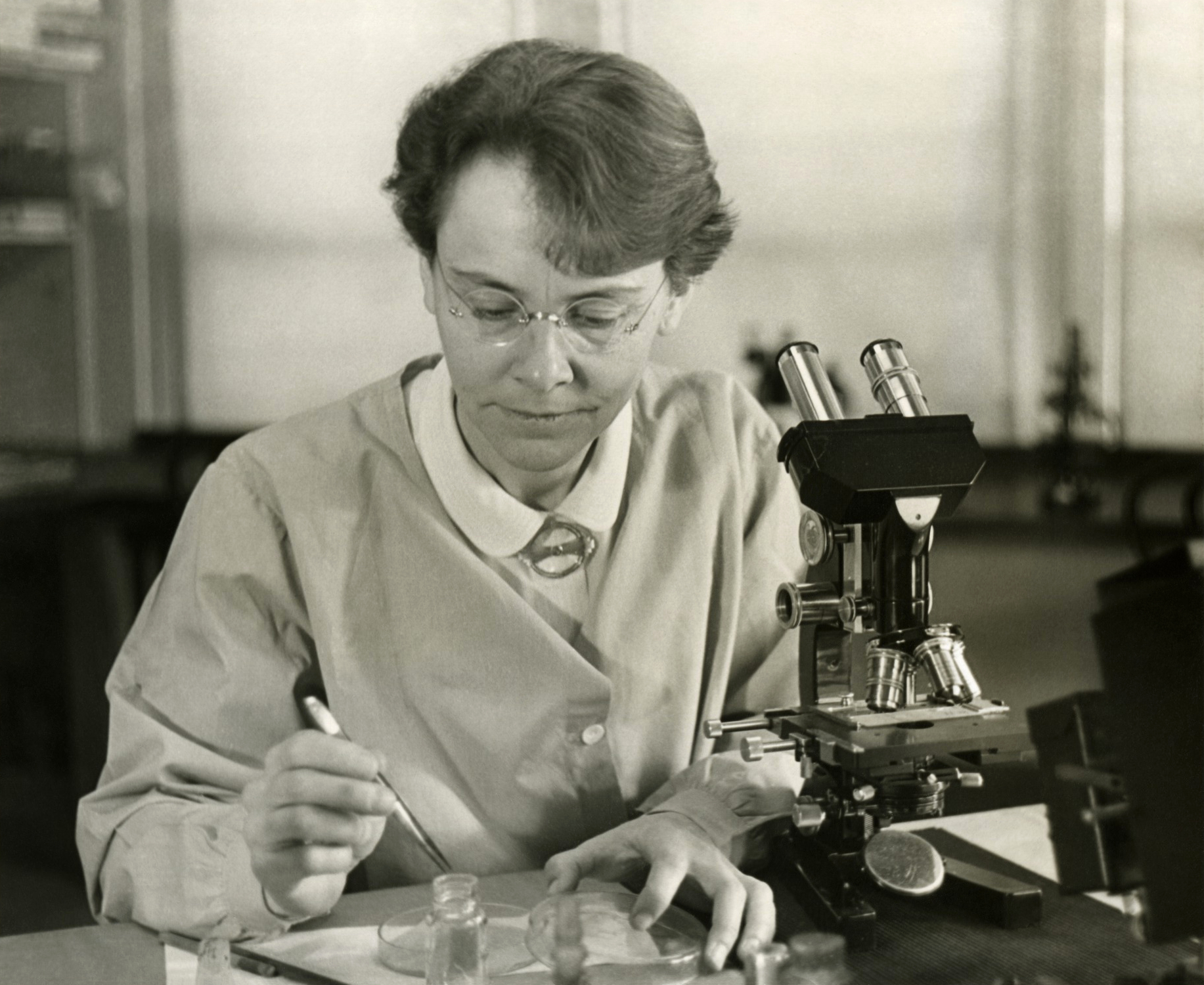
Barbara McClintock

- Nora Lilian Alcock (1874–1972), British plant pathologist
- Alice Alldredge (born 1949), American oceanographer and researcher of marine snow, discover of Transparent Exopolymer Particles (TEP) and demersal hellon
- June Almeida (1930–2007), British virologist
- E. K. Janaki Ammal (1897–1984), Indian botanist
- Lena Clemmons Artz (1891–1976), American botanist
- Vandika Ervandovna Avetisyan (born 1928), Armenian botanist and mycologist
- Denise P. Barlow (1950–2017), British geneticist
- Yvonne Barr (1932–2016), British virologist (co-discovery of Epstein-Barr virus)
- Lela Viola Barton (1901–1967), American botanist
- Kathleen Basford (1916–1998), British botanist
- Gillian Bates (born 1956), British geneticist (Huntington's disease)
- Valerie Beral (1946–2022), British–Australian epidemiologist
- Grace Berlin (1897–1982), American ecologist, ornithologist and historian
- Agathe L. van Beverwijk (1907–1963), Dutch mycologist
- Gladys Black (1909–1998), American ornithologist
- Idelisa Bonnelly (1931–2022), Dominican Republic marine biologist
- Alice Middleton Boring (1883–1955), American biologist
- Annette Frances Braun (1911–1968), American entomologist, expert on microlepidoptera
- Victoria Braithwaite (1967–2019), British biologist and ichthyologist.
- Linda B. Buck (born 1947), American neuroscientist (Nobel prize in Physiology or Medicine 2004 for olfactory receptors)
- Hildred Mary Butler (1906–1975), Australian microbiologist
- Esther Byrnes (1867–1946), American biologist and science teacher
- Bertha Cady (1873–1956), American entomologist and educator
- Audrey Cahn (1905–2008), Australian microbiologist and nutritionist
- Tarsy Carballas (born 1934), Spanish agrarian scientist
- Eleanor Carothers (1882–1957), American zoologist, geneticist and cytologist
- Rachel Carson (1907–1964), American marine biologist and conservationist
- Edith Katherine Cash (1890–1992), American mycologist and lichenologist
- Ann Chapman (1937–2009), New-Zealand biologist and limnologist
- Martha Chase (1927–2003), American molecular biologist
- Mary-Dell Chilton (born 1939), American molecular biologist
- Augusta Christie-Linde (1870–1953), Swedish zoologist
- Theresa Clay (1911–1995), English entomologist
- Edith Clements (1874–1971), American botanist and pioneer of botanical ecology
- Elzada Clover (1897–1980), American botanist
- Gerty Theresa Cori (1896–1957), American biochemist (Nobel Prize in Physiology or Medicine in 1947)
- Suzanne Cory (born 1942), Australian immunologist/cancer researcher
- Ursula M. Cowgill (1927–2015), American biologist and anthropologist
- Beris Cox (1948–2023) , British biostratigrapher and palaeontologist
- Ellinor Catherine Cunningham van Someren (1915–1988), British medical entomologist
- Janet Darbyshire, British epidemiologist
- Gertrude Crotty Davenport (1866–1946), American zoologist and eugenicist
- Nina Demme (1902–1977), Russian arctic explorer and ornithologist
- Myvanwy M. Dick (1910–1993), British-American zoologist and curator
- Johanna Döbereiner (1924–2000), Brazilian pioneer in soil biology
- Sophie Charlotte Ducker (1909–2004), Australian botanist
- Sylvia Earle (born 1935), American marine biologist, oceanographer and explorer
- Sophia Eckerson (1880–1954), American botanist
- Sylvia Edlund (1945–2014), Canadian botanist
- Charlotte Elliott (1883–1974), American plant physiologist
- Alice Catherine Evans (1881–1975), American microbiologist
- Vera Danchakoff (1879 – about 1950), Russian anatomist, cell biologist and embryologist, "mother of stem cells"
- Rhoda Erdmann (1870–1935), German cell biologist
- Katherine Esau (1898–1997), German-American botanist
- Edna H. Fawcett (1879–1960), American botanist
- Catherine Feuillet (born 1965), French molecular biologist who was the first scientist to map the wheat chromosome 3B
- Victoria Foe (born 1945), American developmental biologist, and research professor at the University of Washington's Center for Cell Dynamics
- Dian Fossey (1932–1985), American zoologist
- Faith Fyles (1875–1961), Canada's first botanical artist
- Birutė Galdikas (born 1946), German primatologist and conservationist
- Margaret Sylvia Gilliland (1917–1990), Australian biochemist
- Jane Goodall (1934–2025), British biologist, primatologist
- Isabella Gordon (1901–1988), Scottish marine biologist
- Susan Greenfield (born 1950), British neurophysiologist (neurophysiology of the brain, popularisation of science)
- Constance Endicott Hartt (1900–1984), American botanist
- Marguerite Henry (1895–1982), Australian zoologist
- Eliza Amy Hodgson (1888–1983), New-Zealand botanist
- Lena B. Smithers Hughes (1905–1987), American botanist, developed strains of the Valencia orange
- Maria Isabel Hylton Scott (1889–1990), Argentine zoologist and malacologist
- Eva Jablonka (born 1952), Polish/Israeli biologist and philosopher
- AnnMari Jansson (1934–2007), Swedish systems ecologist
- Adele Juda (1888–1949), Austrian neurologist
- Wilhelmine Key (1872–1955), American geneticist
- Marian Koshland (1921–1997), American immunologist
- Frances Adams Le Sueur (1919–1995), British botanist and ornithologist
- Margaret Reed Lewis (1881–1970), American cell biologist and embryologist
- Maria Carmelo Lico (1927–1985), Brazilian neuroscientist
- Gloria Lim (1930–2022), Singaporean mycologist, first woman Dean of the Faculty of Science, University of Singapore
- Beatrice Lindsay (1858–1917), English zoologist, writer, and editor
- Liliana Lubinska (1904–1990), Polish neuroscientist
- Marguerite Lwoff (1905–1979), French microbiologist and virologist
- Misha Mahowald (1963–1996), American neuroscientist
- Irene Manton (1904–1988), British botanist, cytologist
- Lynn Margulis (1938–2011), American biologist
- Magda Marquet (born 1958), Andorran biotechnologist
- Deborah Martin-Downs, Canadian aquatic biologist, ecologist
- Bettie Sue Masters (born 1937), American biochemist
- Sara Branham Matthews (1888–1962), American microbiologist
- Mary MacArthur (1904–1959), Canadian food scientist, dehydration and freezing of fresh foods
- Barbara McClintock (1902–1992), American geneticist, Nobel prize for Physiology or Medicine 1983
- Eileen McCracken (1920–1988), Irish botanist
- Ruth Colvin Starrett McGuire (1893–1950), American plant pathologist
- Anne McLaren (1927–2007), British developmental biologist
- Ethel Irene McLennan (1891–1983), Australian botanist
- Eunice Thomas Miner (1899–1993), American biologist, executive director of the New York Academy of Sciences 1939–1967
- Rita Levi-Montalcini (1909–2012), Italian neurologist (Nobel prize for Physiology or Medicine 1986 for growth factors)
- Marianne V. Moore (graduated 1975), aquatic ecologist
- Ann Haven Morgan (1882–1966), American zoologist
- Effa Muhse (1877–1968), American biologist
- Ann Nardulli (1948–2018), American endocrinologist
- Margaret Newton (1887–1971), Canadian plant phytopathologist and mycologist (pioneer in stem rust research)
- Christiane Nüsslein-Volhard (born 1942), German geneticist and developmental biologist (Nobel prize for Physiology or Medicine 1995 for homeobox genes)
- Ida Shepard Oldroyd (1856–1940), American conchologist
- Daphne Osborne (1930–2006), British plant physiologist (plant hormones)
- Janina Oszast (1908–1986), Polish biologist, palaeobotanist and resistance movement member
- Janina Oyrzanowska-Poplewska (1918–2001), Polish veterinarian and epizootiologist
- Mary Parke (1908–1989), British marine botanist specialising in phycology, the study of algae
- Jane E. Parker (born 1960), British botanist who researches the immune responses of plants
- Ruth Myrtle Patrick (1907–2013), American botanist, limnologist, and pollution expert
- Eva J. Pell (born 1948), American plant pathologist
- Elisabet Petersson (1873–1919), Swedish zoologist
- Dorota Pospíšilová (born 1930), Slovak viticulturist
- Theodora Lisle Prankerd (1878–1939), British botanist
- Isabella Preston (1881–1965), Canadian ornamental plant breeder (botanist)
- Joan Beauchamp Procter (1897–1931), British zoologist (herpetologist)
- Ragna Rask-Nielsen (1900–1998), Danish biochemist
- Julie Hanta Razafimanahaka, Madagascar biologist, conservationist
- Emma Amy Rea (1865–1927), British mycologist and scientific illustrator
- F. Gwendolen Rees (1906–1994), British parasitologist
- Jytte Reichstein Nilsson (1932–2020), Danish protozoologist
- Evdokia Reshetnik (1903–1996), Ukrainian zoologist and discoverer of Ukraine's sandy blind mole-rat
- Anita Roberts (1942–2006), American molecular biologist, "mother of TGF-Beta"
- Edith A. Roberts (1881–1977), American botanist and plant ecology pioneer
- Gudrun Ruud (1882–1958), Norwegian zoologist specializing in embryology
- Hazel Schmoll (1890–1990), American botanist
- Eva Schönbeck-Temesy (1930–2011), Austrian botanist of Hungarian descent
- Martha Allen Sherwood (1948–2020), American lichenologist
- Rosamund Flora Shove (1878–1954), British botanist and mycologist
- Idah Sithole-Niang (born 1957), Zimbabwean biochemist focusing on cowpea production and disease
- Florence Wells Slater (1864–1941), American entomologist
- Margaret A. Stanley, British virologist and epithelial biologist
- Phyllis Starkey (born 1947), British biochemist and medical researcher
- Magda Staudinger (Latvian: Magda Štaudingere) (1902–1997), Latvian-German biologist and chemist
- Sarah Stewart (1905–1976), Mexican American microbiologist (discovered the Polyomavirus)
- Ragnhild Sundby (1922–2006), Norwegian zoologist
- Felicitas Svejda (1920–2016), Canadian botanist (rose breeder)
- Maria Telkes (1900–1995), Hungarian-American biophysicist
- Lois H. Tiffany (1924–2009), American mycologist
- Amelia Tonon (1899–1961), Italian entomologist
- Lydia Villa-Komaroff (born 1947), Mexican American molecular cellular biologist
- Karen Vousden (born 1957), British cancer researcher
- Elisabeth Vrba (born 1942), South-African paleontologist
- Marvalee Wake (born 1939), American biologist researching limbless amphibians, educator
- Erna Walter (1893–1992), German botanist
- Gerharda Wilbrink (1875–1962), Dutch plant pathologist
- Jane C. Wright (1919–2013), American oncologist
- Delaphine Grace Wyckoff (1906–2001), American microbiologist
- Kono Yasui (1880–1971), Japanese cytologist
- Eleanor Anne Young (1925–2007), American nutritionist and educator
- Mary Sophie Young (1872–1919), American botanist
- Jennie L. S. Simpson (1894 –1977), Canadian-American botanist and geneticist
- Christine Essenberg (1876–1965), Swedish-American marine zoologist and women's education advocate. Discovered new polychaetes and founded the American School for Girls
- Leona Zacharias (1907–1990), American biologist and medical researcher
- Amparo de Zeledón (1870–1951), Costa Rican botanist and philanthropist

== Chemistry ==
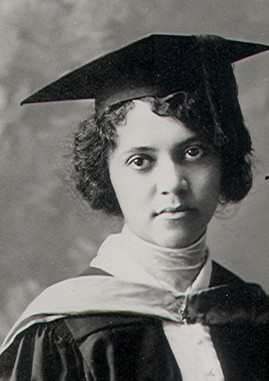
Alice Ball

- Maria Abbracchio (born 1956), Italian pharmacologist who works with purinergic receptors and identified GPR17. On Reuter's most-cited list since 2006.
- Zinesh Abisheva (1947–2021), Kazakh metallurgist and chemical engineer
- Marian Ewurama Addy (1942–2014), Ghanaian biochemist, specializing in herbal medicine; first woman in Ghana to attain the rank of full professor in the natural sciences; winner of the UNESCO Kalinga Prize in 1999
- Barbara Askins (born 1939), American chemist
- Karin Aurivillius (1920–1982), Swedish chemist and crystallographer
- Zinesh Abisheva (1947–2021), Kazakh metallurgist, chemical engineer, civil servant and educator
- Alice Ball (1892–1916), American chemist
- Ulrike Beisiegel (born 1952), German biochemist, researcher of liver fats and first female president of the University of Göttingen
- Anne Beloff-Chain (1921–1991), British biochemist
- Lucie Blanquies (born 1883), French scientist who worked in Marie Curie's laboratory in Paris from 1908 to 1910
- Katie Booth (1907–2005), American biomedical chemist and civil rights activist
- Jeannette Brown (born 1934), American medicinal chemist, writer, educator
- Catherine Chamié (1888–1950), French chemist who worked on radioactivity with Irène Joliot-Curie,
- Ecaterina Ciorănescu-Nenițescu (1909–2000), Romanian chemist
- Astrid Cleve (1875–1968), Swedish chemist
- Seetha Coleman-Kammula (born 1950), Indian chemist and plastics designer, turned environmentalist
- Maria Skłodowska-Curie (1867–1934), Polish-French chemist (pioneer in radiology, discovery of polonium and radium), Nobel prize in physics 1903 and Nobel prize in chemistry 1911
- Mary Campbell Dawbarn (1902–1982), Australian biochemist
- Moira Lenore Dynon (1920–1976), Australian chemist
- Gertrude B. Elion (1918–1999), American biochemist (Nobel prize in Physiology or Medicine 1988 for drug development)
- Claire E. Eyers (fl. 2004), British mass spectrometist
- Nellie Ivy Fisher (1907–1995), London-born industrial chemist, first woman to lead a division of Kodak in Australia
- Gwendolyn Wilson Fowler (1907–1997), American chemist and first licensed African American pharmacist in Iowa
- Rosalind Franklin (1920–1957), British physical chemist and crystallographer
- Ellen Gleditsch (1879–1968), Norwegian radiochemist
- Jenny Glusker (born 1931), British biochemist, educator
- Emīlija Gudriniece (1920–2004), Latvian chemist and academic
- Frances Mary Hamer (1894–1980), British chemist who specialized in photographic sensitization compounds
- Anna J. Harrison (1912–1998), American organic chemist
- Randi Holwech (1890–1967), Norwegian scientist and painter who initially worked with Narie Curie in Paris
- Dorothy Crowfoot Hodgkin (1910–1994), British crystallographer, Nobel prize in chemistry 1964
- Clara Immerwahr (1870–1915), German chemist
- Allene Jeanes (1906–1995), American chemical researcher who developed Dextran and Xanthan gum
- Irène Joliot-Curie (1897–1956), French chemist and nuclear physicist, Nobel Prize in Chemistry 1935
- Madeleine M. Joullié (born 1927), Brazilian organic chemist
- Chika Kuroda (1884–1968), Japanese chemist
- Stephanie Kwolek (1923–2014), American chemist, inventor of Kevlar
- Sine Larsen (1943–2025), Danish chemist and crystallographer
- May Sybil Leslie (1887–1937), British chemist, contributed to research into thorium and actium
- Lidija Liepiņa (1891–1985), Latvian chemist, one of the first Soviet doctorates in chemistry
- Kathleen Lonsdale (1903–1971), British crystallographer
- Bodil Jerslev Lund (1919–2005), Danish chemist and pharmacist
- Grace Medes (1886–1967), American biochemist
- Maud Menten (1879–1960), Canadian biochemist
- Christina Miller (1899–2001), Scottish chemist, one of the first women elected to Royal Society of Edinburgh
- Madeleine Molinier (1898–1976), French scientist and later nurse who worked with Marie Curie
- Catherine J. Murphy (born 1964), American chemist
- Rusudana Nikoladze (1884–1981), Georgian inorganic chemist and educator
- Muriel Wheldale Onslow (1880–1932), British biochemist
- Helen T. Parsons (1886–1977), American biochemist
- Nellie M. Payne (1900–1990), American entomologist and agricultural chemist
- Eva Philbin (1914–2005), Irish chemist
- Angèle Pompéi (1898–1990), French scientist and teacher, friend of Irène Curie
- Pauline Ramart (1880–1953), French chemist and politician
- Darshan Ranganathan (1941–2001), Indian organic chemist
- Léonie Razet (1884–1950), Marie Curie's French-born permanent secretary at the Radium Institute in Paris
- Mildred Rebstock (1919–2011), American pharmaceutical chemist
- Elizabeth Rona (1890–1981), Hungarian (naturalized American), nuclear chemist and polonium expert
- Patsy Sherman (1930–2008), American chemist, co-inventor of Scotchgard
- Marija Šimanska (1922–1995), Latvian chemist
- Taneko Suzuki (1926–2020), Japanese biochemist who created Marinbeef, a product made of fish that tasted like beef
- Ida Noddack Tacke (1896–1978), German chemist and physicist
- Grace Oladunni Taylor (born 1937), Nigerian chemist 2nd woman inducted into the Nigerian Academy of Science
- Bianca Tchoubar (1910–1990), Ukrainian born French chemist specialising in reaction mechanisms
- Jean Thomas (born 1942), British biochemist (chromatin)
- Michiyo Tsujimura (1888–1969), Japanese biochemist, agricultural scientist
- Joanna Maria Vandenberg (born 1938), Dutch solid state chemist and crystallographer
- Mary Louisa Willard (1998–1993), American chemist and forensic scientist
- Elizabeth Williamson, English pharmacologist and herbalist
- Germaine Marie Wiswald, (1891–1988), Swiss chemical engineer who worked with Marie Curie in Paris
- Ruby K. Worner (1900–1955), American chemist and textiles expert
- Ada Yonath (1939–2026), Israeli crystallographer, Nobel prize in Chemistry 2009
- Daisy Yen Wu (1902–1993), first Chinese woman to work as a biochemist

== Geology ==
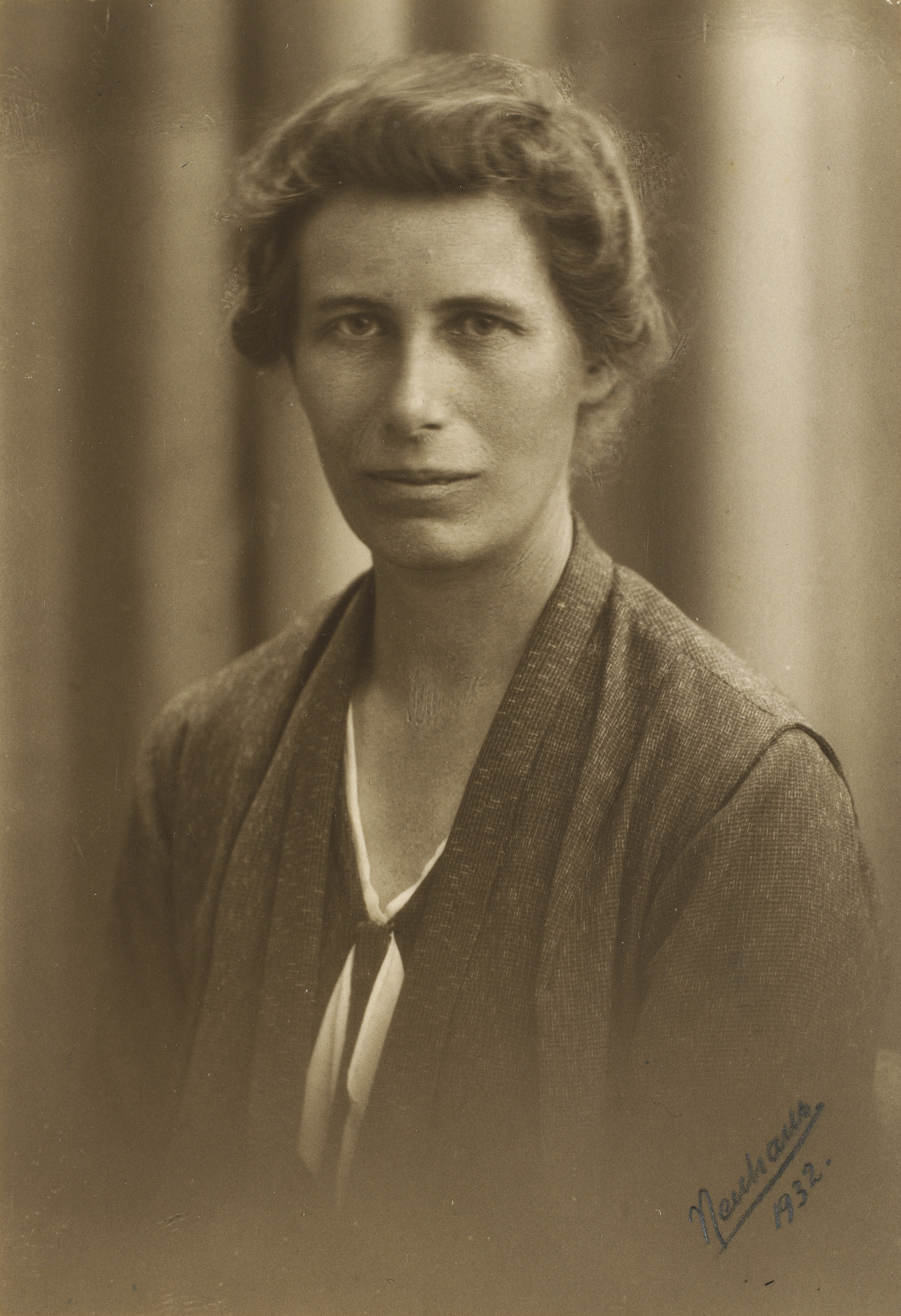
Inge Lehmann in 1932

- Zonia Baber (1862–1955), American geographer and geologist
- Tove Birkelund (1928–1986), Danish historical geologist
- Karen Callisen (1882–1970), Danish geologist
- Inés Cifuentes (1954–2014), American seismologist and educator
- Mathilde Dolgopol de Sáez (1901–1957), Argentinian vertebrate paleontologist
- Moira Dunbar (1918–1999), Scottish-Canadian glaciologist
- Elizabeth F. Fisher (1872–1941), American geologist
- Regina Fleszarowa (1888–1969), Polish geologist
- Frances Gamble (1942–1997), South-African speleologist and climatologist
- Winifred Goldring (1888–1971), American paleontologist
- Eileen Hendriks (1887–1978), British geologist
- Rosemary Hutton (1925–2004, Scottish geophysicist and pioneer of magnetotellurics
- Edith Kristan-Tollmann (1934–1995), Austrian geologist and paleontologist
- Dorothée Le Maître (1896–1990), French paleontologist
- Rosaly Lopes (born 1957), Brazilian planetary geologist, volcanologist
- Karen Cook McNally (1940–2014), American seismologist
- Inge Lehmann (1888–1993), Danish seismologist who discovered Earth's solid inner core
- Marcia McNutt (born 1951), American geophysicist
- Ellen Louise Mertz (1896–1987), Danish engineering geologist
- Mária Mottl (1906–1980), Hungarian speleologist and vertebrate paleontologist
- Madeline Munro (1885–1974), English geologist, science educator and film reviewer
- Ruth Schmidt (1916–2014), American geologist
- Ethel Shakespear (1871–1946), English geologist
- Kathleen Sherrard (1898–1975), Australian geologist and palaeontologist
- Ethel Skeat (1865–1939), English paleontologist and geologist
- H. Catherine W. Skinner (1931-2025), American geologist and mineralogist
- Marjorie Sweeting (1920–1994), British geomorphologist
- Marie Tharp (1920–2006), American geologist and oceanographic cartographer
- Elsa G. Vilmundardóttir (1932–2008), Iceland's first female geologist
- Marguerite Williams (1895–1991), American geologist
- Alice Wilson (1881–1964), Canadian geologist and paleontologist
- Elizabeth A. Wood (1912–2006), American crystallographer and geologist

== Mathematics or computer science ==
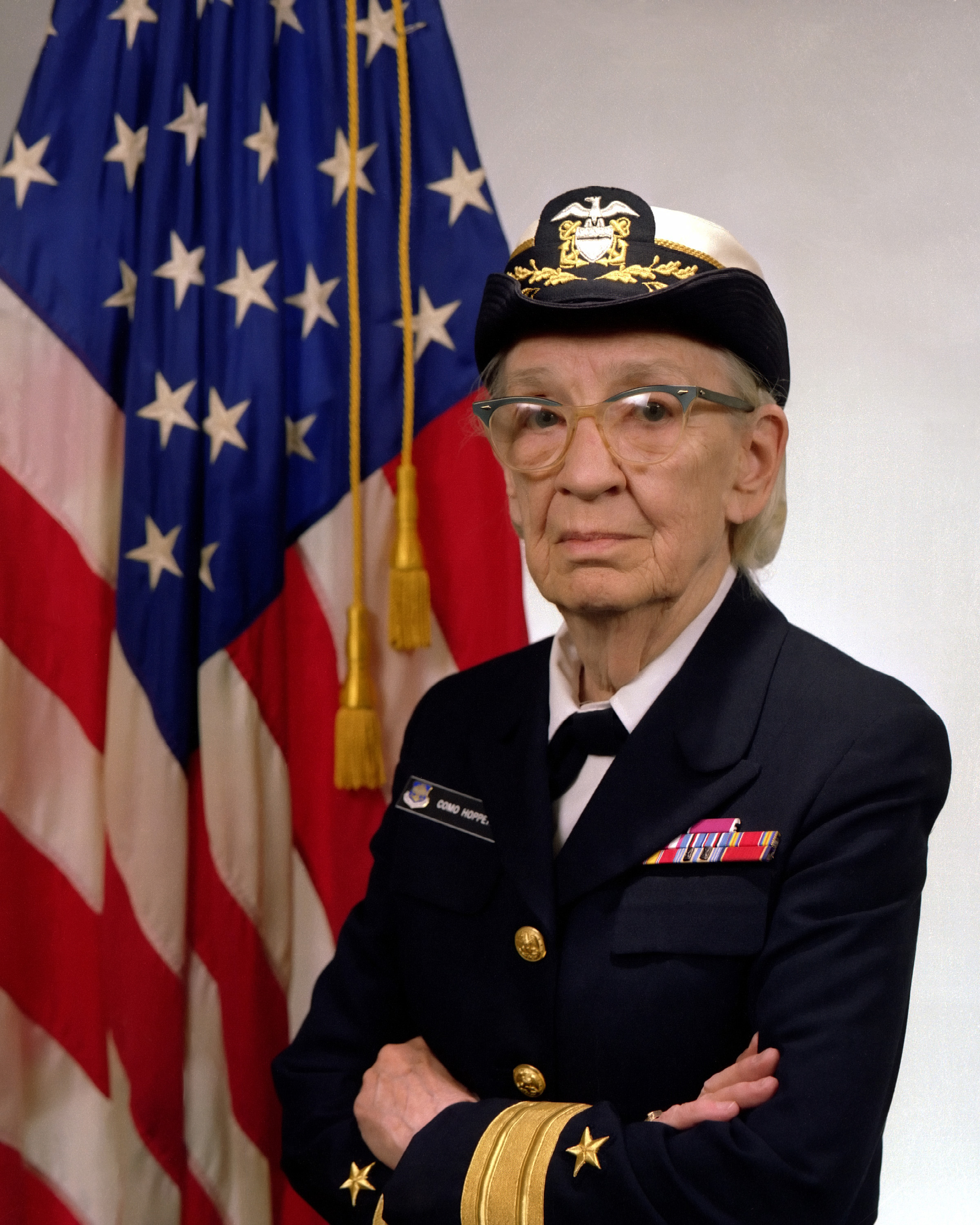
Grace Hopper, computer scientist

- Carolina Araujo (born 1976), Brazilian mathematician
- Hertha Marks Ayrton (1854–1923), British mathematician and electrical engineer (electric arcs, sand ripples, invention of several devices, geometry)
- Cecilia Berdichevsky (1925–2010), Argentinian pioneering computer scientist
- Anita Borg (1949–2003), American computer scientist, founder of the Institute for Women and Technology
- Mary L. Cartwright (1900–1998), British mathematician
- Amanda Chessell, British computer scientist
- Ingrid Daubechies (born 1954), Belgian mathematician (Wavelets – first woman to receive the National Academy of Sciences Award in Mathematics)
- Tatjana Ehrenfest-Afanassjewa (1876–1964), Russian/Dutch mathematician
- Deborah Estrin (born 1959), American computer scientist
- Vera Faddeeva (Russian: Вера Николаевна Фаддеева) (1906–1983), Russian mathematician. One of the first to publish works on linear algebra.
- Shafi Goldwasser (born 1959), American-Israel computer scientist
- Evelyn Boyd Granville (1924–2023), American mathematician, second African-American woman to get a PhD in mathematics
- Marion Cameron Gray (1902–1979), Scottish mathematician
- Tamara Oleksiyivna Grinchenko (born 1938), Ukrainian computer scientist
- Barbara J. Grosz (born 1948), American computer scientist; 1993 President of the AAAI
- Milly Koss (1928–2012), American computing pioneer
- Bryna Kra (born 1966), American mathematician
- Margaret Hamilton (born 1936), American computer scientist, systems engineer, and business owner
- Frances Hardcastle (1866–1941), English mathematician, founding member of the American Mathematical Society
- Julia Hirschberg, American computer scientist and computational linguist
- Betty Holberton (1927–2001), American computer programmer
- Grace Hopper (1906–1992), American computer scientist
- Sandra Hutchins (born 1946), American computer scientists
- Margarethe Kahn (1880–1942), German mathematician
- Lyudmila Keldysh (1904–1976), Russia mathematician known for set theory and geometric topology
- Marta Kwiatkowska (born 1957), Polish-British Computer scientist
- Marguerite Lehr (1898–1987), American mathematician
- Margaret Anne LeMone (born 1946), American mathematician and atmospheric scientist
- Barbara Liskov (born 1939), American computer scientist for whom the Liskov substitution principle is named
- Margaret Millington (1944–1973), English mathematician
- Mangala Narlikar (1943–2023), Indian mathematician
- Klara Dan von Neumann (1911–1963), Hungarian computer scientist
- Frances Northcutt (born 1943), American engineer
- Rózsa Péter (1905–1977), Hungarian mathematician
- Cicely Popplewell (1920–1995), British software engineer, 1960s
- Njeri Rionge (1966–2023), Kenyan technology entrepreneur
- Karen Sparck Jones (1935–2007), British computer scientist
- Dorothy Vaughan (1910–2008), American mathematician, worked at NACA's Langley Memorial Aeronautical Laboratory
- Dorothy Maud Wrinch (1894–1976), British mathematician and theoretical biochemist
- Jeannette Wing (born 1956), American computer scientist, Microsoft Corporate Vice President
- Maryam Mirzakhani (1977–2017), Iranian mathematician, first female recipient of the Fields Medal
- Karen Uhlenbeck (born 1942), American mathematician and founder of modern geometric analysis

== Science education ==
- Kathleen Jannette Anderson (1927–2002), Scottish biologist
- Susan Blackmore (born 1951), British science writer (memetics, evolutionary theory, consciousness, parapsychology)
- Florence Annie Yeldham (1877–1945), British school teacher and historian of arithmetic

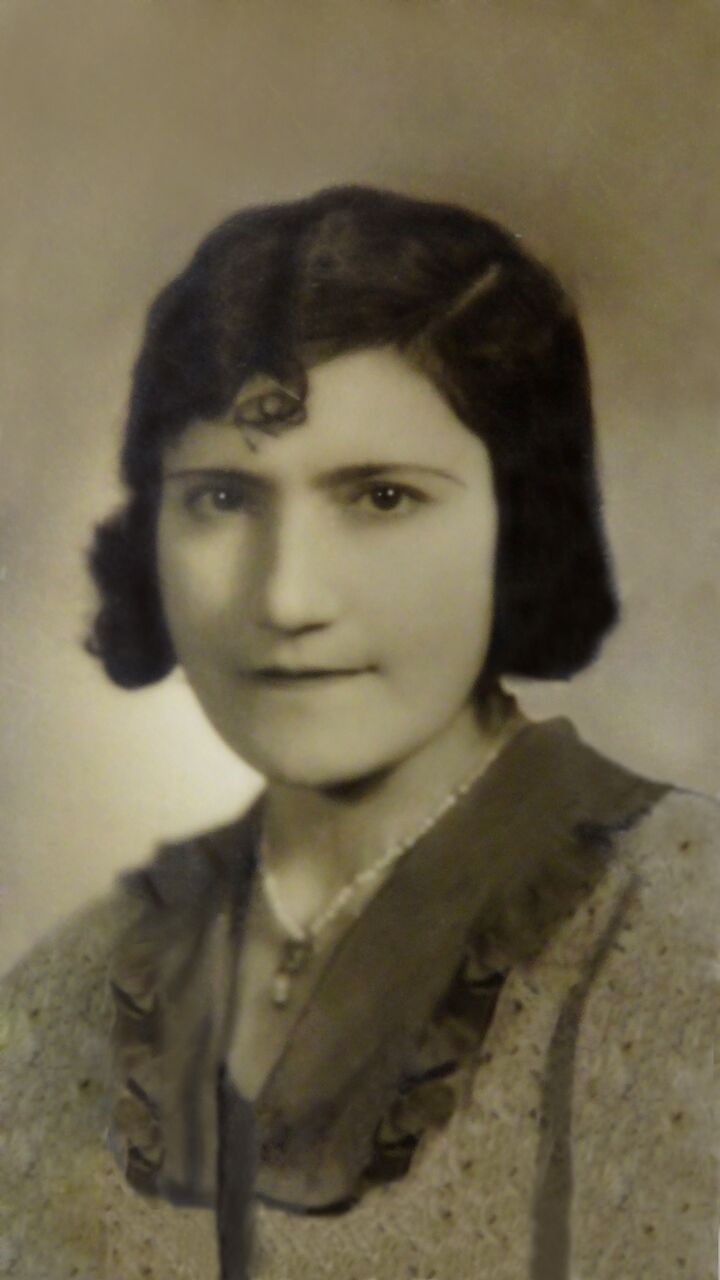
Mexican civil engineer, Concepción Mendizábal Mendoza (1893–1985)

== Engineering ==
- Isabelle Archinard (1903—1995), Swiss scientist who worked with Marie Curie in Paris
- Zhenan Bao (born 1970), American chemical engineer and materials scientist
- Frances Bradfield (1896–1967), British aeronautical engineer
- Jayne Bryant, British engineering director for BAE Systems
- Nance Dicciani (born 1947), American chemical engineer
- Isabel Escobar, Brazilian engineer
- Ana María Flores (born 1952), Bolivian engineer
- Kate Gleason (1865–1933), American engineer
- Paula T. Hammond (born 1963), American chemical engineer and material scientist
- Ida Holz (born 1935), Uruguayan engineer
- Frances Hugle (1927–1968), American engineer
- Marianne Kärrholm (1921–2018), Swedish chemical engineer
- Julia King, Baroness Brown of Cambridge (born 1954), British engineer
- Elsie MacGill (1907–1980), Canadian First Canadian female engineer
- Florence Violet McKenzie (1890 or 1892–1982), first female electrical engineer in Australia
- Concepción Mendizábal Mendoza (1893–1985), Mexican first female civil engineer in Mexico
- Maria Tereza Jorge Pádua (born 1943), Brazilian ecologist
- Katharina Paulus (1868–1953), German aeronaut
- Molly Shoichet (born 1965), Canadian biomedical engineer
- Adrienne Weill (1903–1979), French engineer, student of Marie Curie
- Laura Anne Willson (1877–1942), British engineer and suffragette

== Medicine ==
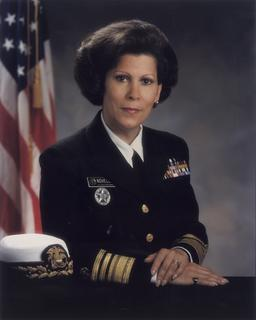
Vice Admiral Antonia C. Novello

- Tawhida Abdel-Rahman (1906–1974), Egyptian medical doctor
- Phyllis Margery Anderson (1901–1957), Australian pathologist
- Virginia Apgar (1909–1974), American obstetrical anesthesiologist (inventor of the Apgar score)
- Heather Ashton (1929–2019), English psychopharmacologist
- Lykke Aresin (1921–2011), German physician and sexologist
- Anna Baetjer (1899–1984), American physiologist and toxicologist
- Roberta Bondar (born 1945), Canadian, space medicine
- Dorothy Lavinia Brown (1919–2004), American surgeon
- Audrey Cahn (1905–2008), Australian nutritionist and microbiologist
- Margaret Chan (born 1947), Chinese-Canadian health administrator; director of the World Health Organization
- Evelyn Stocking Crosslin (1919–1991), American physician
- Eleanor Davies-Colley (1874–1934), British surgeon (first female FRCS)
- Nina Einhorn (1923–2002), Polish-born Swedish oncologist
- Claire Fagin (1926–2024), American health-care researcher
- Adriana Fiorentini (1926–2016), Italian physiologist
- Sophia Getzowa (1872–1946), Belarusian-Israeli pathologist
- Esther Greisheimer (1891–1982), American academic and medical researcher
- L. Ruth Guy (1913–2006), American academic and pathologist
- Janina Hurynowicz (1894–1967), Polish doctor, neurophysiologist, resistance member
- Karen C. Johnson (born 1955), American physician and clinical trials specialist who is one of Reuter's most cited scientists
- Krista Kostial-Šimonović (1923–2018), Croatian physiologist and heavy metals expert
- Mary Jeanne Kreek (1937–2021), American neurobiologist
- Pavla Jerina Lah (1915–2007), Slovene surgeon and partisan
- Elise L'Esperance (1878–1958), American pathologist
- Elaine Marjory Little (1884–1974), Australian pathologist
- Mary Fauriel Lockett (1911–1982), English-born Australian pharmacologist
- Anna Suk-Fong Lok, Chinese/American hepatologist, wrote WHO and AASLD guidelines for emerging countries and liver disease
- Ida Dorothy Love (1908–1990), Australian military nurse and midwifery educator
- Eleanor Josephine Macdonald (1906–2007), American pioneer cancer epidemiologist and cancer researcher
- Catharine Macfarlane (1877–1969), American obstetrician and gynecologist
- Charlotte E. Maguire (1918—2014), Florida pediatrician and medical school benefactor
- Louisa Martindale (1872–1966), British surgeon
- Helen Mayo (1878–1967), Australian doctor and pioneer in preventing infant mortality
- Frances Gertrude McGill (1882–1959), Canadian forensic pathologist
- Eleanor Montague (1926–2018), American radiologist and radiotherapist
- Anne B. Newman (born 1955), US Geriatrics & Gerontology expert
- Antonia Novello (born 1944), Puerto-Rican physician and Surgeon General of the United States
- Dorothea Orem (1914–2007), American Nursing theorist
- Ida Ørskov (1922–2007), Danish bacteriologist
- May Owen (1892–1988), American pathologist, discovered talcum powder used on surgical gloves caused infection and peritoneal scarring
- Angeliki Panagiotatou (1875–1954), Greek physician and microbiologist
- Kathleen I. Pritchard (born 1956), Canadian oncologist, breast cancer researcher and noted as one of Reuter's most cited scientists
- Frieda Robscheit-Robbins (1888–1973), German-American pathologist
- Ora Mendelsohn Rosen (1935–1990), American medical researcher
- Una Ryan (born 1941), Malaysian born-American, heart disease researcher, biotech vaccine and diagnostics maker/marketer
- Una M. Ryan (born 1966), patented DNA test identifying the protozoan parasite Cryptosporidium
- Galina Savelyeva (1928–2022), Russian gynaecologist
- Velma Scantlebury (born 1955), Bajan-American first woman of African descent to become a transplant surgeon in the U.S.
- Lise Thiry (1921–2024), Belgian virologist, senator
- Helen Rodríguez Trías (1929–2001), Puerto-Rican American pediatrician and advocate for women's reproductive rights
- Celina Turchi, Brazilian epidemiologist
- Stina Stenhagen (1916–1973), Swedish biochemist
- Marie Stopes (1880–1958), British paleobotanist and pioneer in birth control
- Elizabeth M. Ward, American epidemiologist and head of the Epidemiology and Surveillance Research Department of the American Cancer Society
- Hazel Hitson Weidman (1923–2024), American medical anthropologist
- Elsie Widdowson (1908–2000), British nutritionist
- Fiona Wood (born 1958), British-Australian plastic surgeon

== Meteorology ==
- Rely Zlatarovic (fl. 1920), Austrian-trained meteorologist
- Nadia Zyncenko (born 1948), Argentine meteorologist

== Paleoanthropology ==
- Mary Leakey (1913–1996), British paleoanthropologist
- Suzanne Leclercq (1901–1994), Belgian paleobotanist and paleontologist
- Betty Kellett Nadeau (1905–1999), American paleontologist

== Physics ==
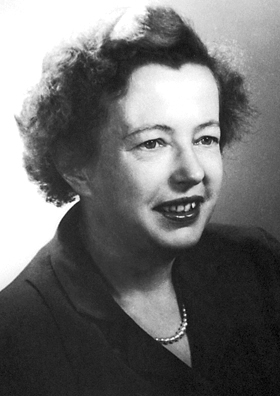
Maria Goeppert-Mayer

- Fay Ajzenberg-Selove (1926–2012), American nuclear physicist, winner of the 2007 US National Medal of Science
- Giuseppina Aliverti (1894–1982), Italian geophysicist
- Betsy Ancker-Johnson (1927–2020), American plasma physicist
- Alice Armstrong (1897–1989), American physicist
- Marion Asche (1935–2013), German physicist and researcher of solid state physics
- Sonja Ashauer (1923–1948), Brazilian first Brazilian woman to earn a doctorate in physics
- Milla Baldo-Ceolin (1924–2011), Italian particle physicist
- Márcia Barbosa, Brazilian physicist
- Marietta Blau (1894–1970), Austrian experimental particle physicist with Marie Curie
- Lili Bleeker (1897–1985), Dutch physicist
- Katharine Blodgett (1898–1979), American thin-film physicist
- Christiane Bonnelle (died 2016), French spectroscopist
- Tatiana Birshtein (1928–2022), Russian molecular scientist specializing in the physics of polymers
- Margrete Heiberg Bose (1866–1952), Danish physicist (active in Argentina from 1909)
- Jenny Rosenthal Bramley (1909–1997), Lithuanian-American physicist
- Harriet Brooks (1876–1933), Canadian radiation physicist
- Nina Byers (1930–2014), American physicist
- Yvette Cauchois (1908–1999), French physicist
- Yvonne Choquet-Bruhat (1923–2025), French theoretical physicist
- Kwang Hwa Chung (born 1948), Korean physicist
- Hilda Cid (born 1933), Chilean biophysicist who excelled in the field of crystallography
- Patricia Cladis (1937–2017), Canadian/American physicist
- A. Catrina Coleman (born 1956), Scottish laser scientist
- Esther Conwell (1922–2014), American physicist, semiconductors
- Jane Dewey (1900–1979), American physicist
- Cécile DeWitt-Morette (1922–2017), French mathematician and physicist
- Louise Dolan (born 1950), American mathematical physicist, theoretical particle physics and superstring theory
- Nancy M. Dowdy (born 1938), American nuclear physicist, arms control
- Mildred Dresselhaus (1930–2017), American physicist, graphite, graphite intercalation compounds, fullerenes, carbon nanotubes, and low-dimensional thermoelectrics
- Helen T. Edwards (1936–2016), American physicist, Tevatron
- Magda Ericson (born 1929), French nuclear physicist
- Edith Farkas (1921–1993), Hungarian-born-New-Zealand meteorologist who measured ozone levels
- Jeanne Ferrier (1888–1979). French physicist, pioneer in the field of radiotherapy, worked with Marie Curie
- Joan Feynman (1927–2020), American physicist
- Ursula Franklin (1921–2016), Canadian metallurgist, research physicist, author and educator
- Judy Franz (born 1938), American physicist and educator
- Joan Maie Freeman (1918–1998), Australian physicist
- Phyllis S. Freier (1921–1992), American astrophysicist
- Mary K. Gaillard (born 1939), American theoretical physicist
- Fanny Gates (1872–1931), American physicist
- Claire F. Gmachl (born 1967), American physicist
- Maria Goeppert-Mayer (1906–1972), German-American physicist, Nobel Prize in Physics 1963
- Gertrude Scharff Goldhaber (1911–1998), American nuclear physicist
- Sulamith Goldhaber (1923–1965), American high-energy physicist and molecular spectroscopist
- Gail Hanson (born 1947), American high-energy physicist
- Margrete Heiberg Bose (1866–1952), Danish/Argentine physicist
- Evans Hayward (1922–2020), American physicist
- Caroline Herzenberg (born 1932), American physicist
- Hanna von Hoerner (1942–2014), German astrophysicist
- Helen Schaeffer Huff (1883–1913), American physicist
- Shirley Ann Jackson (born 1946), American nuclear physicist, president of Rensselaer Polytechnic Institute, first African-American woman to earn a doctorate from MIT
- Alice Leigh-Smith (née Prebil, 1907–1987), Croatian-born physicist, student of Marie Curie
- Bertha Swirles Jeffreys (1903–1999), British physicist
- Lorella M. Jones (1943–1995), American particle physicist
- Carole Jordan (born 1941), British solar physicist
- Renata Kallosh (born 1943), Russian/American theoretical physicist
- Berta Karlik (1904–1990), Austrian physicist
- Bruria Kaufman (1918–2010), American theoretical physicist
- Elizaveta Karamihailova (1897–1968), Bulgarian nuclear physicist
- Marcia Keith (1859–1950), American physicist
- Ann Kiessling (born 1942), American physicist
- Margaret G. Kivelson (born 1928), American space physicist and planetary scientist
- Noemie Benczer Koller (born 1933)
- Ninni Kronberg (1874–1946), Swedish physiologist in nutrition
- Doris Kuhlmann-Wilsdorf (1922–2010)
- Elizabeth Laird (physicist) (1874–1969)
- Luise Lange (1891–1978), German physicist.
- Juliet Lee-Franzini (1933–2014), American particle physicist
- Inge Lehmann (1888–1993), Danish seismologist and geophysicist
- Kathleen Lonsdale (1903–1971), Irish crystallographer
- Barbara Kegerreis Lunde (born 1937), American physicist
- Margaret Eliza Maltby (1860–1944), American physicist
- Marguerite Macaigne (1908–2000), French physicist, research with Marie Curie
- Mileva Maric (1875–1948), Serbian physicist, first wife of Albert Einstein
- Nina Marković, Croatian physicist and professor
- Helen Megaw (1907–2002), Irish crystallographer
- Lise Meitner (1878–1968), Austrian nuclear physicist (pioneering nuclear physics, discovery of nuclear fission, protactinium, and the Auger effect)
- Kirstine Meyer (1861–1941)
- Luise Meyer-Schutzmeister (1915–1981)
- Anna Nagurney Canadian-born, US operations researcher/management scientist focusing on networks
- Chiara Nappi (born 1951), Italian American physicist
- Ann Nelson (1958–2019), American physicist
- Marcia Neugebauer (born 1932), American geophysicist
- Gertrude Neumark (1927–2010)
- Ida Tacke Noddack (1896–1979)

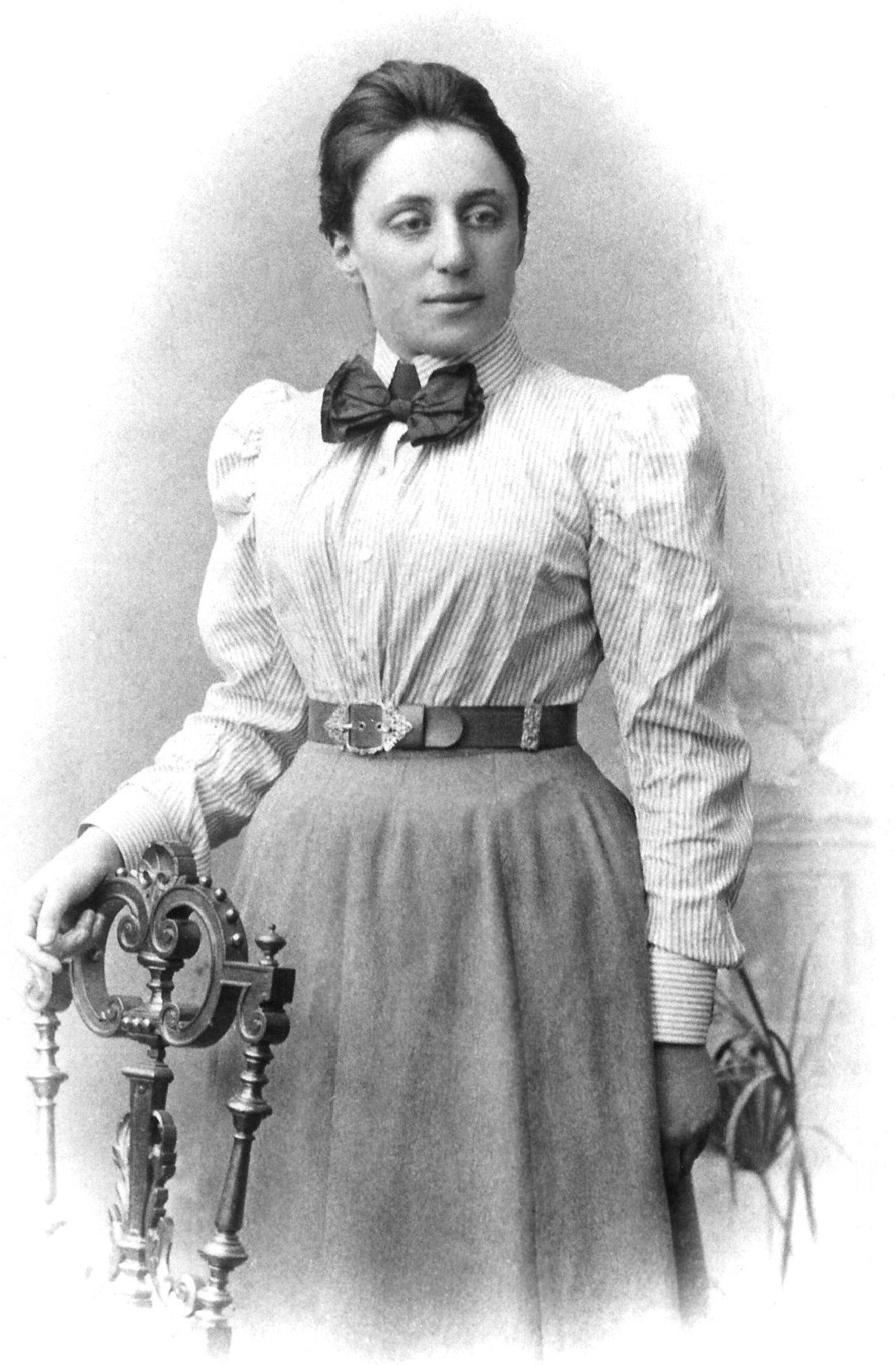
Emmy Noether

- Emmy Noether (1882–1935), German mathematician and theoretical physicist (symmetries and conservation laws)
- Marguerite Perey (1909–1975)
- Melba Phillips (1907–2004)
- Agnes Pockels (1862–1935)
- Pelageya Polubarinova-Kochina (1899–1999), Russian physicist
- Edith Quimby (1891–1982)
- Helen Quinn (born 1943), American particle physicist
- Eva Ramstedt (1879–1974), Swedish physicist and radiologist
- Lisa Randall (born 1962), American physicist
- Emma Unson Rotor (1913-1998), Filipino-American physicist and mathematician
- Myriam Sarachik (1933–2021), American physicist
- Signe Schmidt-Nielsen (1878–1959), Swedish-Norwegian physicist and nutritionist
- Alice Scouvart (1885–1932), Belgian scientist who worked with Marie Curie in Paris
- Bice Sechi-Zorn (1928–1984), Italian/American nuclear physicist
- Anneke Levelt Sengers (1929–2024), Dutch physicist specializing in the critical states of fluids
- Hertha Sponer (1895–1968), German/American physicist and chemist
- Isabelle Stone (1868–1944), American thin-film physicist and educator
- Edith Anne Stoney (1869–1938), Anglo-Irish medical physicist
- Nina Vedeneyeva (1882–1955), Russian geological physicist
- Afërdita Veveçka Priftaj (1948–2017), Albanian physicist
- Isabel Jocelyn Waldbauer (1905–1968) – physicist who worked on radioactivity with Marie Curie
- Katharine Way (1903–1995), American nuclear physicist
- Mariana Weissmann (born 1933), Argentine physicist, computational physics of condensed matte
- Marie Henriette Wibratte (1911–1944), French physicist who worked in the laboratory of Marie Curie
- Lucy Wilson (1888–1980), American physicist, working on optics and perception
- Leona Woods (1919–1986), American nuclear physicist
- Chien-Shiung Wu (1912–1997), Chinese-American physicist (nuclear physics, [non-]conservation of parity)
- Sau Lan Wu (born 1940), Chinese-American particle physicist
- Xide Xie (Hsi-teh Hsieh) (1921–2000), Chinese physicist
- Rosalyn Sussman Yalow (1921–2011), American medical physicist (Nobel Prize in Physiology or Medicine 1977 for radioimmunoassay)
- Fumiko Yonezawa (1938–2019), Japanese theoretical physicist
- Toshiko Yuasa (1909–1980), Japanese nuclear physicist

== Psychology ==
Mamie Phipps Clark

- Mary Ainsworth (1913–1999), American-Canadian developmental psychologist, inventor of the "Strange Situation" procedure
- Gauri Rani Banerjee, Indian medical and psychiatric social worker
- Martha E. Bernal (1931–2001), Mexican-American clinical psychologist, first Latina to receive a psychology PhD in the United States
- Lera Boroditsky, American psychologist
- Ludmilla A.Chistovich (1924–2006), Russian speech scientist
- Mamie Clark (1917–1983), African-American psychologist active in the civil rights movement
- Helen Flanders Dunbar (1902–1959), American important early figure in U.S. psychosomatic medicine
- Lili Hajdú Gimesné (1891–1960), Hungarian psychiatrist and psychoanalyst
- Tsuruko Haraguchi (1886–1915), Japanese psychologist
- Margaret Kennard (1899–1975), American pioneering researcher on age effects on brain damage, which produced early evidence for neuroplasticity
- Varia Kipiani (1879–1950/1965), pioneering Georgian (country) psychophysiologist who studied fatigue and child development
- Grace Manson (1893–1967), American occupational psychologist
- Lily Pincus (1898–1981), German-born British social worker, marital psychotherapist and author
- Rosalie Rayner (1898–1935), American psychology researcher
- Nise da Silveira (1905–1999), Brazilian psychiatrist and mental health reformer
- Marianne Simmel (1923–2010), American psychologist, made important contributions in research on social perception and phantom limb
- Davida Teller (1938–2011), American psychologist, known for work on development of the visual system in infants
- Nora Volkow (born 1956), Mexican-American psychiatrist, director of the National Institute on Drug Abuse (NIDA)
- Margo Wilson (1945–2009), Canadian evolutionary psychologist
- Catherine G. Wolf (1947–2018), American psychologist and expert in human-computer interaction

== See also ==
- Index of women scientists articles
- List of female mathematicians
- List of female Nobel laureates
- Timeline of women in science
- Women in computing
- Women in engineering
- Women in geology
- Women in medicine
