= Adriana Fiorentini =

Italian physiologist

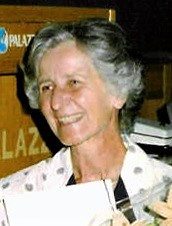
- Born: 1 November 1926; Milan, Italy
- Died: 29 February 2016 (aged 89); Marina di Pisa, Italy
- Occupation: Physiologist
- Known for: Visual perception studies

Adriana Fiorentini (1 November 1926 – 29 February 2016) was an Italian physicist and physiologist active in research on human and animal visual perception.

== Biography ==
Born in Milan, Fiorentini studied up to high school in the same city, obtaining the Classical Maturity in the Liceo Classico of Voghera, and then graduated from the University of Florence in Physics in October 1948 in Florence, discussing a thesis on the topic of physical spectroscopy with Professor George Abetti.

=== Visual perception research ===
While working at the National Institute of Optics in Arcetri, she noticed a contrast phenomenon which she correctly interpreted as an optical illusion, and was able to relate it to the phenomenon known as Mach bands. This led her to shift her interest from optics towards visual perception, on the stimulus and in collaboration with physicist Giuliano Toraldo di Francia. In the years spent in Arcetri (1948–1968), Fiorentini published numerous works on physiological optics and perception. In particular, from that period, two studies greatly influenced the field: the first, introducing the technique called "subthreshold summation," described the excitatory or inhibitory interaction between two luminous bars as a function of distance, when one of the two bars is below the threshold for perception; this made it possible to measure neural interactions as a function of the distance between two stimuli and to produce one of the first measures of the profile of receptive fields in humans. The second, in collaboration with Professor Donald MacCrimmon MacKayby Keele, she demonstrated the correlation between a perceptive anomaly generated by a particular stimulus and the visual potentials evoked by the same stimulus in the occipital areas. There are numerous chapters in scientific books that Fiorentini authored on the perception of contrast and the distinction between brightness and clarity. During this period she also contributed to the training of Italian opticians with the text "Eyes and glasses," which used in professional training courses.

In 1966 she began collaborating with neurologist Lamberto Maffei, also thanks to the encouragement of neurophysiologist Giuseppe Moruzzi, and moved permanently to Pisa in 1968, first as a university assistant and then as a researcher at the Italian National Research Council (CNR). Working together with Maffei, Fiorentini used a method which consisted in asking the same questions to human perception and to the individual visual cells of animals, aiming to interpret, as far as possible, visual perception in terms of the properties of neurons. This innovative approach has produced numerous works including “The visual cortex as a spatial frequency analyzer” and "The unresponsive regions of the visual cortical receptive fields." In this last work, the two authors identified the existence of interactions between neurons located in different areas of the visual cortex, anticipating the discovery of "horizontal connections," which allow the integration of information coming from different points of the field visual and allow the so-called context effects, i.e. the change in the perception of a stimulus according to the visual context in which it is inserted.

=== Visual function development ===
Another field of investigation by Fiorentini was the study, with visual evoked potentials, of the development of the visual function in humans and animals, producing, for example, the first measurement of the development of the contrast sensitivity curve in children. With the same technique numerous studies have made it possible to evaluate, even in non-cooperative subjects such as small children, the integrity of monocular and binocular vision, also for the purpose of an early correction of visual defects.

In 1978, Fiorentini made an unexpected observation. Working on a task of discriminating two simple visual stimuli, two grids formed by alternating light and dark lines of vertical orientation and, after several discrimination trials, her performance was found to be consistent. However, when she verified the results and rotated the orientation of the reticles from vertical to horizontal, her performance suddenly turned out to be very low: she could no longer discriminate the two stimuli that she previously discriminated perfectly. She immediately interpreted this drop in performance as the result of a failure to transfer the skills learned in the practice of discriminating vertical lattices to the situation where the lattices were horizontal. And indeed, with practice in discriminating horizontal gratings, the performance progressively improved until it reached that obtained with the vertical reticles. The same thing happened if the width of the bars was changed. Fiorentini understood that it was therefore a phenomenon of perceptual learning (an improvement of the organism's ability to extract information from the environment as a result of the practice), which showed surprising selectivity for the physical characteristics of the object on which the practice was practiced. This allowed her to locate the neural changes induced by the practice in visual areas in which the cells showed selectivity for the orientation of visual stimuli, i.e. in visual areas such as the primary visual cortex. At the time, the phenomena of learning and memory were linked to the functioning of "superior" brain areas, and primary visual cortex function was associated exclusively with perception. Instead, her finding that the phenomena of plasticity linked to perceptual learning could occur was a discovery of significant importance.

She died peacefully in Pisa, Italy, on 29 February 2016.

=== Professional activities ===
With Lamberto Maffei, Fiorentini wrote the book Art and the brain, on the nature of visual perception and visual language, which was very successful and received numerous awards. She also authored Eyes and Glasses.

Over the years, she personally helped build a European research community devoted to visual perception. She organized two conferences of the European Conference on Visual Perception (ECVP) and was on the editorial board of Perception for many years, and on the editorial boards of Vision Research, Brain and Behavioural Research, Clinical Vision Sciences, and Optica Acta.
