= Elisabet Petersson =

Swedish zoologist

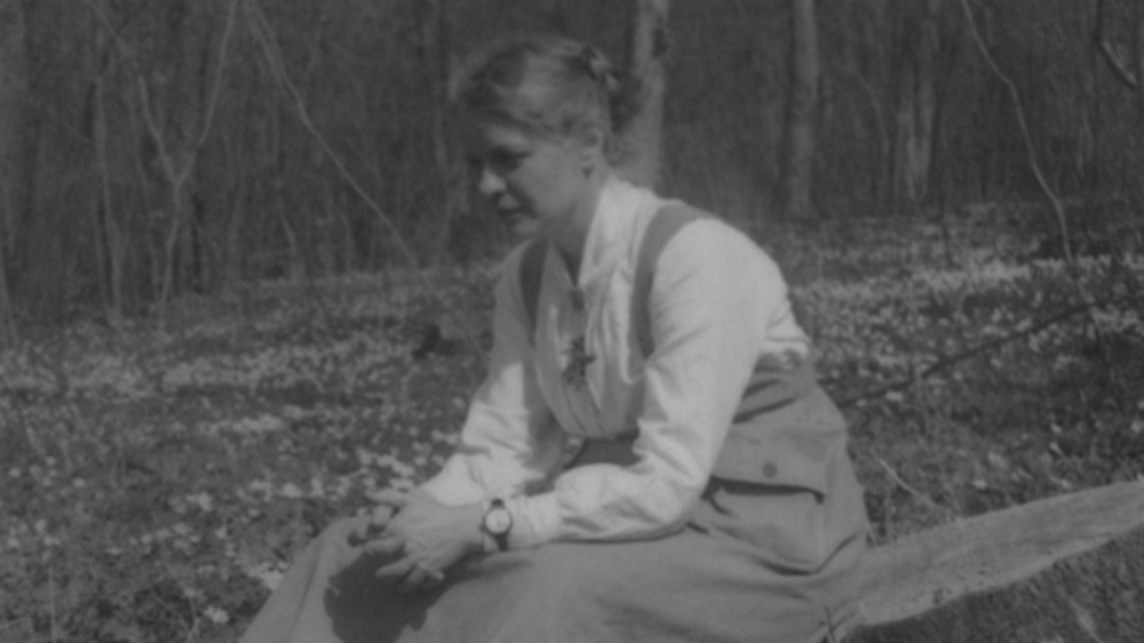
Elisabet Petersson

Elisabet Petersson (1873–1919) was a Swedish zoologist and a high school teacher, who is remembered for her pioneering work in collecting materials from marine research stations for the Gothenburg National History Museum. From 1913, she organized several trips to the North Sea coast, including the islands of Heligoland, Germany, and Väderöarna, Sweden. She also collaborated with the Trondhjem Biological Station in Norway and the Kristineberg Marine Research Station on Sweden's Gullmarn Fjord. She died of tuberculosis in March 1919, aged only 46. The many marine echinoderms she collected can be seen in the Gothenburg Natural History Museum while her photographs are preserved in the museum's archives.

== Early life and education ==
Born on 19 November 1873 in Ljusdal, central Sweden, Elisabet Petersson was the daughter of the land surveyor Carl Albert Petersson and his wife Hedvig Frederique née Bamberg. She was the family's second child. When she was four, her mother died. After her father remarried, she helped to raise his new wife's five children. As a girl, Petersson could not attend the local Gävle grammar school but as a private pupil she was able to take the school leaving certificate in 1897. On matriculating, she registered as one of the first women students at the University of Uppsala. In 1902, with chemistry, physics and mathematics as her main subjects, she graduated with a B.Sc.

== Career ==
On graduating, Petersson worked as a schoolteacher in towns including Gävle and Katrineholm. From 1908, she taught mathematics, biology and chemistry at a coeducational state school in Alingsås. Her photographs show she went on field trips with her pupils and that she also planted trees with them. From 1913, she was active in the Swedish women's suffrage movement, becoming a board member of the National Association for Women's Suffrage.

Over the years, she had taken an increasing interest in zoology which she studied herself. In 1912, she began making collecting trips to marine research stations, visiting the German island of Helgoland in 1913. She donated the materials she had collected to the Natural History Museum in Gothenburg. In 1915, on behalf of the museum, she undertook a trip to the Kristineberg Zoological Station on the Gullmarn Fjord. Further trips included the islands of Väderöarna on the Swedish west coast and the biological station of Trondheim in Norway. In 1918, she again visited Kristineberg.

Elisabeth Petersson died in Gothenburg on 8 March 1919, as a result of the tuberculosis she had contracted at an early age. The marine zoological samples she collected form an important part of the holdings of the Gothenburg National History Museum. Her photographies are preserved in the museum's archives.
