= Jytte Reichstein Nilsson =

Danish protozoologist (1932–2020)

Jytte Reichstein Nilsson (1932–2020) was a Danish protozoologist and educator. She is remembered for her research into cell biology, undertaking electron-microscopic studies into cell structures, including the interplay between cell building and function. She served as vice-president of the Society of Protozoologists (1977), later becoming an honorary member. She contributed some 80 papers on her research to scientific journals.

== Biography ==
Born on 27 April 1932 in Lunderskov near Kolding in Jutland, Jytte Reichstein Nilsson was the daughter of the engineer Arthur Nilsson (1904–1973) and his wife Lucretia Margrethe Reichstein née Petersen (1901–1965). In July 1954, she married the chemist Carl Ulrich Linderstrøm-Lang (1928–1978). They had two children together: Steen (1954) and Anette (1956).

While at high school, Nilsson started to work as a laboratory assistant at the Carlsberg Laboratory. She continued while studying zoology at the University of Copenhagen. After her marriage in 1954, she spent three years in Uganda where she worked on the effects of anaerobia on animals at Makerere University as the assistant of L.C. Beadle. On returning to Denmark, she continued studying physiology, earning a master's degree in protozoology in 1961.

Until 1971, Nilsson worked at the Carlsberg Foundation's Biological Institute which included a study trip to the University of Rochester Medical Center in the United States. While with the Carlsberg Foundation, she conducted detailed research on the interplay between form and function in single-celled organisms, mastering the use of electron microscopy and autoradiography. From 1972, she was engaged as a lector specializing in cell biology by Copenhagen University. She earned a doctorate in 1976 and was appointed docent. She retired in 1999.

Nilsson was vice-president of the Society of Protozoologists (1977–1978), becoming an honorary member in 1995. From 1985 to 1989, she was a member of Statens Naturvidenskabelige Forskningsråd, the Danish Scientific Research Council.

Jytte Reichstein Nilsson died on 19 September 2020.
