= Tarsy Carballas =

Spanish soil scientist (1934–2026)

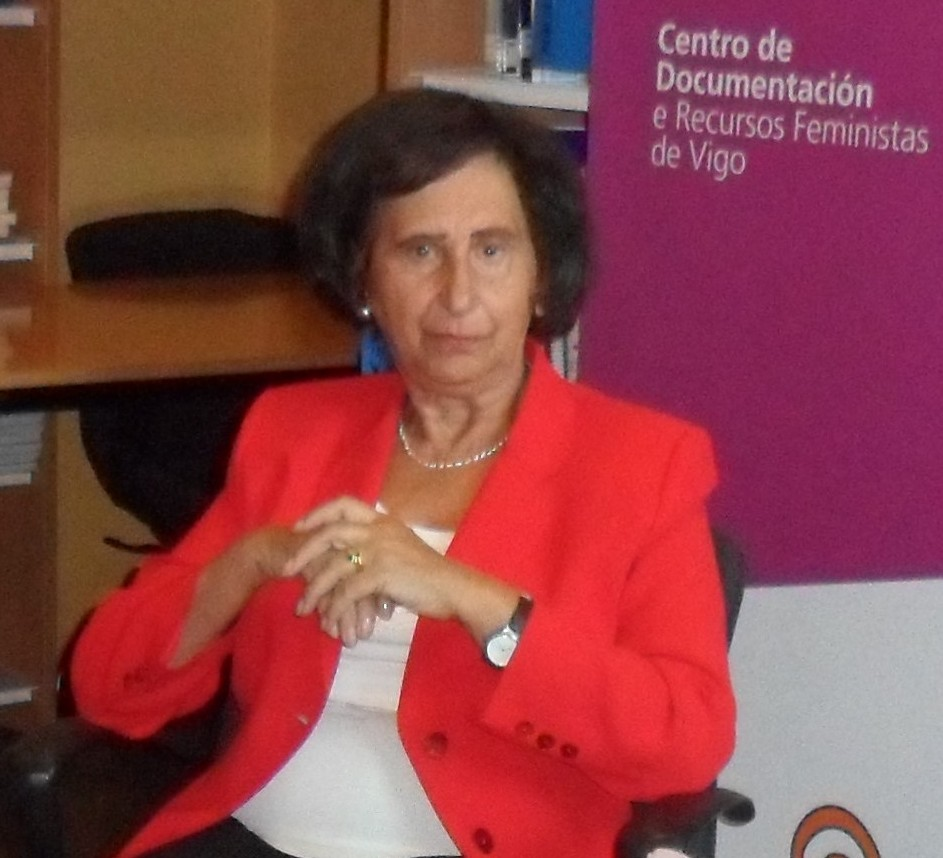
Tarsy Carballas at the Center for Documentation and Feminist Resources of Vigo on 8 October 2013

María Tarsy Carballas Fernández (2 June 1934 – 16 May 2026) was a Spanish scientist who was a pioneer in the study of soils in the humid temperate zone of Spain. In 2009, she was awarded the Castelao Medal. In 2012, she won a Chemical Excellence Award for a study of forest fire prevention. In 2012, she won the María Josefa Wonenburger Planells Prize.

Carballas was a member of the Agrarian Sciences Area Commission and the Government Board. She did research at the Galicia Biological Mission, in Santiago de Compostela and was a recognized expert in forest fire prevention.

== Life and career ==
María Tarsy Carballas Fernández was born on 2 June 1934, in the municipality of Taboada, Spain. She was very close to her father Miño. She had a strong desire to become a journalist, but it was a difficult career for women to enter at the time. Instead, she decided to focus on science, graduating from the University of Santiago de Compostela in 1958 with a pharmacy degree. She then earned a chemical sciences degree in 1963 and a doctorate in pharmacy in 1964 from the University of Nancy in France. She began working in the 1960s, at the Spanish National Research Council, researching soil science. She researched solutions to recover land in areas affected by fires.

Carballas pioneered studies on the genesis, characterization, classification and cartography of the Spanish soils in warm-humid zones of her country. The result of this work led to the preparation of soil maps of Galicia, Asturias, Cantabria, León, Zamora and the Huesca Pyrenees that were used by the United Nations for its World Soils Map.

When she returned to Compostela from Nancy, she worked in the Soil Laboratory of the Agrobiological Research Institute of Galicia of the Spanish National Council for Scientific Research. Later, she was the laboratory's director for several years. She became well known for her studies of forest fires: their causes and consequences. With Paz Andrade, she published a method to help predict forest fire risks in the country.

Carballas died on 16 May 2026, at the age of 91.

== Honors ==
- President of the Advisory Council for Research and Technological Development of the Xunta de Galicia
- Received the Castelao Medal awarded in 2009.
- Received the María Josefa Wonenburger Prize, awarded in 2012 by the Galician Women and Science Unit.

== Selected works ==
- Ojea, Francisco Guitián; Fernández, Tarsy Carballas (1982). Suelos naturales de la provincia de Orense (in Spanish). Editorial CSIC - CSIC Press. ISBN 84-00-05175-0.
- Ojea, Francisco Guitián; Fernández, Tarsy Carballas (1976). Técnicas de análisis de suelos (in Spanish). Editorial Pico Sacro. ISBN 84-85170-09-1.
- Carballas, T. (1989). FAOUnesco mapa mundial de suelos. Leyenda revisada. Informes sobre recursos mundiales de suelos (in Spanish). Organización de las Naciones Unidas para la Agricultura y la Alimentación. ISBN 978-92-5-303022-4.
