= Sonia Alconini =

Bolivian anthropologist and archaeologist

- Born: Sonia Alconini Mujica; 1965 (age 60–61)
- Occupation: Archaeologist

Sonia Alconini Mujica (born 1965) is a Bolivian anthropologist and archaeologist specializing in the socioeconomic and political development of early states and empires in the Andes. She has studied the dynamics of ancient imperial frontiers, and the ways in which Guarani tropical tribes expanded over these spaces. She has also conducted work in the eastern Bolivian valleys and Lake Titicaca region.

== Biography ==
Sonia Alconini Mujica was born 1965 in Bolivia and developed an early interest in the political formations of early Andean societies and the use of archaeology to improve the understanding of cultural relationships. In 1992, she participated in the Taraco Archaeological Project of UC Berkeley at Chiripa, an ongoing project aimed at unraveling the socioeconomic and political development of the Formative Period of the Lake Titicaca basin. Pottery shards excavated at the site were from Chiripa, Chiripa-Mamani, and Tiwanaku III, IV, and V phases of civilization. She completed her undergraduate degree in 1993 from the Universidad Mayor de San Andrés in La Paz and went on to study at the University of Pittsburgh, earning a master's degree in anthropology in 2000 and a PhD in archaeology in 2002. In 2004, Alconini was hired as an assistant professor at the University of Texas at San Antonio and in 2010, she was promoted to an associate professor in the Department of Anthropology.

Her early research focused on the spread of the Inka into the Bolivian highlands and their impact on the civilizations already in the area, showing interaction between cultures rather than domination. She won a US National Science Foundation grant in 2007 to further explore the boundaries of the Inka expansion and clarify changes before and after Inka contact. The aim of the project was to determine how contact with the Inka effected settlement patterns and the political economy of the area. In 2009, Alconini's excavations in the Charazani valley, the ancient imperial center of the Kallawayas, at a site called Pata Kaata yielded new insights into the evolution of the area, the range of activities which took place in its sacred sites, the process used to maintain political legitimacy and the hierarchy of the cultures at the borders of Lake Titicaca. In 2013, her collaboration with Sara Becker of the University of California at Riverside at the Wata Wata site, uncovered three skulls, two belonging to women. Examination showed ritual acts of violence, including beheading and removal of the eyes with no sign of battle injury. The discovery scuttled a long-held belief that images of violence were not literal depictions but were illustrative. Alconini's assessment of the evidence concluded that the inhabitants of Tiwanaku empire in the Kallawaya region of Bolivia, used trade, religion, and ritual violence as political strategies to retain power.

== Selected works ==
- Alconini, Sonia (1991). "Algunas reflexiones sobre la formación de la arqueología en Bolivia". Etnología (in Spanish). 15 (19). La Paz, Bolivia: 57–68.
- Alconini Mujica, Sonia (1993). La cerámica de la pirámide akapana y su contexto social en e estado de Tiwanaku (Tesis de Licenciatura) (in Spanish). La Paz, Bolivia: Universidad Mayor de San Andrés.
- Alconini Mujica, Sonia (1995). Rito, símbolo e historia en la pirámide de Akapana, Tiwanaku: un análisis de cerámica ceremonial prehispánica (in Spanish). La Paz, Bolivia: Editorial Acción.
- Alconini, Sonia (2002). Prehistoric Inka Frontier Structure and Dynamics in the Bolivian Chaco (PhD). Pittsburgh, Pennsylvania: University of Pittsburgh.
- Alconini, Sonia (2003). "Mujeres de élite en los albores del Imperio Inka: guerra y legitimación política" (PDF). Textos Antropológicos (in Spanish). 14 (2). La Paz, Bolivia: Universidad Mayor de San Andrés: 149–158.
- Alconini, Sonia (2005). "Resumen de las excavaciones en el asentamiento Yoroma. Region Oroncota: Efectos de la politica Inka en un centro administrativo Yampara" (PDF). Revista Nuevos Aportes (in Spanish) (3). La Paz, Bolivia: ArqueoBolivia: 46–55.
- Alconini, Sonia (25 August 2007). "La ocupación Inka en Charazani: Arquitectura de poder y reocupación de espacios sagrados (un avance de investigación)" (PDF). Anales de la XXI Reunión Annual de Etnologia (in Spanish) (3). La Paz, Bolivia: MUSEF: 59–62.
- Alconini, Sonia (2008). Izeta, Andrés D. (ed.). El Inkario en los valles del Sur Andino Boliviano: los Yamparas entre la arqueología y etnohistoria (PDF). South American Archaeology Series (in Spanish). Vol. IV. Oxford, England: British Archaeological Reports International Series 10784.
- Malpass, Michael A.; Alconini, Sonia (2010). Distant Provinces in the Inka Empire: Toward a Deeper Understanding of Inka Imperialism. Iowa City: University of Iowa Press. ISBN 978-1-58729-933-9.
- Becker, Sara K; Alconini, Sonia (March 2015). "Head extraction, interregional exchange, and political strategies of control at the site of Wata Wata, Kallawaya territory, Bolivia, during the transition between the Late Formative and Tiwanaku periods (A.D. 200-800)". Latin American Antiquity. 26 (1). Washington, DC: Society for American Archaeology: 30–48. doi:10.7183/1045-6635.26.1.30. S2CID 155909100.

== Bibliography ==
- Bauer, Brian S.; Stanish, Charles (15 June 2001). Ritual and Pilgrimage in the Ancient Andes: The Islands of the Sun and the Moon. Austin, Texas: University of Texas Press. ISBN 978-0-292-70890-7.
- McCann, Katherine D. (2000). Boudon, Lawrence (ed.). Social Sciences. Handbook of Latin American Studies. Vol. 57. Austin, Texas: University of Texas Press. ISBN 978-0-292-75243-6.
- Parker, Bradley J.; Rodseth, Lars (2005). Untaming the Frontier in Anthropology, Archaeology, and History. Tucson, Arizona: University of Arizona Press. ISBN 978-0-8165-2452-5.
