= Trondhjem Biological Station =

Marine biological research facility in Trondheim, Norway

Coordinates: 63.44136°N 10.34785°E

Trondhjem Biological Station (Norwegian: Trondhjem biologiske stasjon) is a marine biological research facility at the Norwegian University of Science and Technology. It is located by the Trondheimsfjord in Byneset, west of the city centre of Trondheim.

It was founded in 1900. It was directly subordinate to the Norwegian national government for the first fifty years of existence, and from 1951 to 1984 it belonged to the Royal Norwegian Society of Sciences and Letters Museum.
