= Vision Research =

- Discipline: Neuroscience, visual system, ophthalmology, optometry
- Language: English
- Edited by: Jonathan Victor and Paul McGraw

Publication details
- History: 1961-present
- Publisher: Elsevier (Netherlands)
- Frequency: Monthly
- Impact factor: 2.2 (2025)

Standard abbreviations
- ISO 4: Vis. Res.
- NLM: Vision Res

Indexing
- CODEN: VISRAM
- ISSN: 0042-6989 (print); 1878-5646 (web)
- LCCN: 64009802
- OCLC no.: 01589794

Links
- Journal homepage; Online access

Vision Research is a peer-reviewed scientific journal specializing in the neuroscience and psychology of the visual system of humans and other animals. The journal is abstracted and indexed in PubMed. The journal's impact factor for 2020 was 1.886 and its 5-year impact factor was 2.823.
