= Eileen McCracken =

Irish botanist, geographer and historian of botany

Eileen May McCracken
- Born: Eileen May Webb; 16 February 1920; Lisburn, Ireland
- Died: 12 November 1988 (aged 68); Durban, South Africa
- Education: Queen's University Belfast: B.Sc; B.Sc Hons; M.Sc; PhD (1962)
- Occupations: Botanist, historian
- Notable work: Irish woods since Tudor times (David & Charles,1971); The Palm House & Botanic Garden, Belfast (UHAI, 1971); The Brightest Jewel: A history of the National Botanic Gardens, Glasnevin, Dublin, (with Charles Nelson) (Boethius, 1987); and The way to Kistenbosch (History of South African botanic gardens), (with Donal McCracken) (NBGSA, 1988)
- Scientific career
- Fields: Botanic gardens history, forest history
- Workplaces: University of Witwatersrand (1947-1949); Various schools including: Regent House School; St Mary's College, Clady

Eileen May McCracken (16 February 1920 – 12 November 1988) was an Irish botanist, geographer and historian of botany. She also wrote on the history of Irish Gardens.

== Life ==
Born 16 February 1920 in Lisburn, Ireland, the daughter of Colin and Bessie Webb, McCracken was educated at the Friends' School Lisburn and the Queens' University, Belfast, where she gained her BSc, M.Sc and PhD (1962).

On 8 April 1944 she married the historian Leslie (J.L.) McCracken MRIA (1914-2008). Three children: Sean, Donal and Dermot. She moved to South Africa in 1947, and lectured at the University of Witwatersrand, on geography. Returned to Ireland in 1950. Lived in Dublin, Derry and Portballintrae before returning to South Africa to retire in 1982. From 1959 until 1982 she owned a cottage at the seafront at Kilcoole, County Wicklow.

She wrote on the landscape of Ireland from Tudor times, on early Irish ironworks, on the early Irish plant nursery trade, on the Botanic Gardens in Belfast and on the Irish National Botanic Gardens at Glasnevin.

She held strong views on various subjects, including the rights of women and greatly admired the women involved in the Irish War of Independence. She was a great lover of animals.

She died in Durban in 1988. A plaque of Wicklow granite set in the ground outside the Alpine House at Glasnevin Botanic Gardens reads: 'Eileen May McCracken 1920-1988 Botanist and Historian of this Botanic Garden'.

== Legacy ==
Bound sets of her papers have been deposited at the National Botanic Gardens, and in the National Library of Ireland, Dublin.

== Bibliography ==
- McCracken, Eileen (1971). The Palm House and Botanic Garden, Belfast. Belfast: Ulster Architectural Heritage Society. ISBN 978-0-900457-01-2.
- Irish Woods since Tudor Times: Their Distribution and Exploitation. David & Charles. 25 February 1971. ISBN 978-0715350089.
- Eileen & Donal McCracken (1984). A Register of Trees for Co. Londonderry 1768-1911. Public Record Office N. Ireland.
- E. Charles Nelson; Eileen M. McCracken (1987). The Brightest Jewel: A history of the National Botanic Gardens Glasnevin, Dublin. Boethius Press, Kilkenny. ISBN 0863140831.
- Donal P. McCracken; Eileen M. McCracken (1988). The Way to Kirstenbosch (History of South African botanic gardens), Annals of Kirstenbosch volume 18, Cape Town. National Botanic Gardens. ISBN 062011648X.
- "Tree planting by tenants in Meath, 1800 - 1850". Ríocht Na Midhe. 1988–1989: 3–20. 1989.
- E. M. McCracken and E. C. Nelson (1989). "Julius Wilhelm Keit, a German horticulturist at the Botanic Gardens, Glasnevin". Moorea. 8: 34–40.
