= Christiane Bonnelle =

French physicist

Professor Christiane Bonnelle
- Died: 21 August 2016
- Education: Sorbonne (Bachelor of Science, 1954; Doctor of Science, 1964)
- Awards: CNRS Bronze Medal Chevalier (Knight) of the Ordre des Palmes Académiques
- Scientific career
- Fields: Spectral analysis Spectroheliograms of the solar corona X-ray spectroscopy
- Workplaces: CNRS Sorbonne Laboratory of Physical Chemistry, Pierre and Marie Curie University

Christiane Bonnelle (French pronunciation: [kʁistjan bɔnɛl], died 21 August 2016) was a French physicist and pioneering spectroscopist, who served as professor emeritus at Pierre and Marie Curie University.

== Career and education ==
Bonnelle studied at the Sorbonne, from which she received Bachelor of Science and Doctor of Science degrees. After completing her degree, Bonnelle worked at CNRS in 1955, where she worked as an intern and then researcher. In 1960 she started working as an assistant professor at the Sorbonne, becoming a professor in 1967. She moved to Pierre and Marie Curie University in 1974, where she became director of the Laboratory of Physical Chemistry in 1979. Bonnelle worked in this role until 1990.

== Research ==
Bonnelle's research on solid-solid interfaces produced developments in the measurement of the nanometre, which facilitated developments in electron probes produced by CAMECA.

== Awards ==
In 1967 she received a CNRS bronze medal. She is also a chevalier of the Ordre des Palmes Académiques.

== Selected publications ==
- "Distribution des états f dans les métaux et les oxyde de terres rares", Journal de Physique, 32, C4-230 (1971) with R.C. Karnatak (DOI: 10.1051/jphyscol:1971443). This paper described observations of excited states.
- "Analyses par spectroscopie X des distributions 5f de l'uranium dans le métal et UO", Journal de Physique, 35 295-299 (1979) with G. Lachère (DOI: 10.1051/jphys:01974003503029500). This paper dealt with radiative transitions on uranium.
- "Resonant X-ray Emission Spectroscopy in Solids", Advances in X-Ray Spectroscopy: Contributions in Honour of Professor Y. Cauchois (Elsevier, 2013).
