= Gudrun Ruud =

Norwegian zoologist (1882–1958)

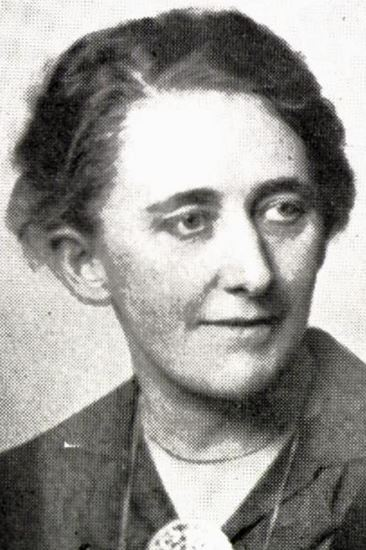
- Born: 14 April 1882; Oslo
- Died: 30 December 1958 (aged 76)
- Awards: Norwegian Academy

Academic background
- Education: University of Oslo
- Influences: Kristine Bonnevie; Hans Spemann; Ross G. Harrison

Academic work
- Institutions: Zoological Laboratory
- Main interests: zoologist
- Notable ideas: axolotl

Gudrun Marie Ruud (14 April 1882 – 31 December 1958) was a Norwegian zoologist and educator. She is remembered for her pioneering embryological research based on experimentation with salamanders.

== Early life ==
Born in Christiania, Ruud was the youngest daughter of a prosperous merchant, I.A. Ruud. She enjoyed a pleasant childhood in a large property with geese and poultry on the grounds. From an early age, she was attracted by the birds, animals and plants she encountered during her holidays in Østre Aker, just outside the capital. She first attended a teacher training establishment before embarking on science studies at the Royal Frederick University, graduating in 1913. In order to support the cost of her studies, from 1910 she worked as an assistant at the Zoological Laboratory.

== Career ==
Thanks to her work in the laboratory, she soon became Kristine Bonnevie's most important collaborator, a position she maintained for several years. In 1916, still at the laboratory, she was promoted to the rank of associate professor, a title she held throughout her professional life until her retirement in 1948.

Ruud's main area of research was experimental embryology centred on how the various cells develop in an embryo. From 1916 to 1920, she travelled to Berlin on several occasions to work with Hans Spemann at the Kaiser-Wilhelm-Institut für Biologie. In 1925, she went to the United States where she worked with Ross G. Harrison of Yale University carrying out experimental work on the axolotl or Mexican salamander. On returning to Oslo two years later, she discovered how an arm could grow out of an unexpected place on the body of the axolotl.

Teaching formed an important part of Ruud's activities at the laboratory. In addition to assisting Bonnevie with her zoology course which covered anatomy, embryology and cytology, Ruud was responsible for a one-year practical course and for lectures on histology. She also introduced students to microscopy. Ruud played an active part at the university's biological station in Drøbak where she helped with practical courses in zoology based on animal life in the fjord.

In 1932, Ruud became a member of the Norwegian Academy of Science and Letters. She died in her sleep on 31 December 1958.

== Selected publications ==
- Ruud, Gudrun (1926). The Symmetry Relations of Transplanted Limbs in Amblystoma Tigrinum. Wistar Institute Press.
- Ruud, Gudrun (1934). Dyreliv i Sjøens Strandbelte (in Norwegian). Aschehoug.
- Ruud, Gudrun (1913). Om hudsanseorganene hos Spinax niger, Bonaparte (in Norwegian). Kristiania.
