= Margrete Heiberg Bose =

Argentine physicist (1865–1952)

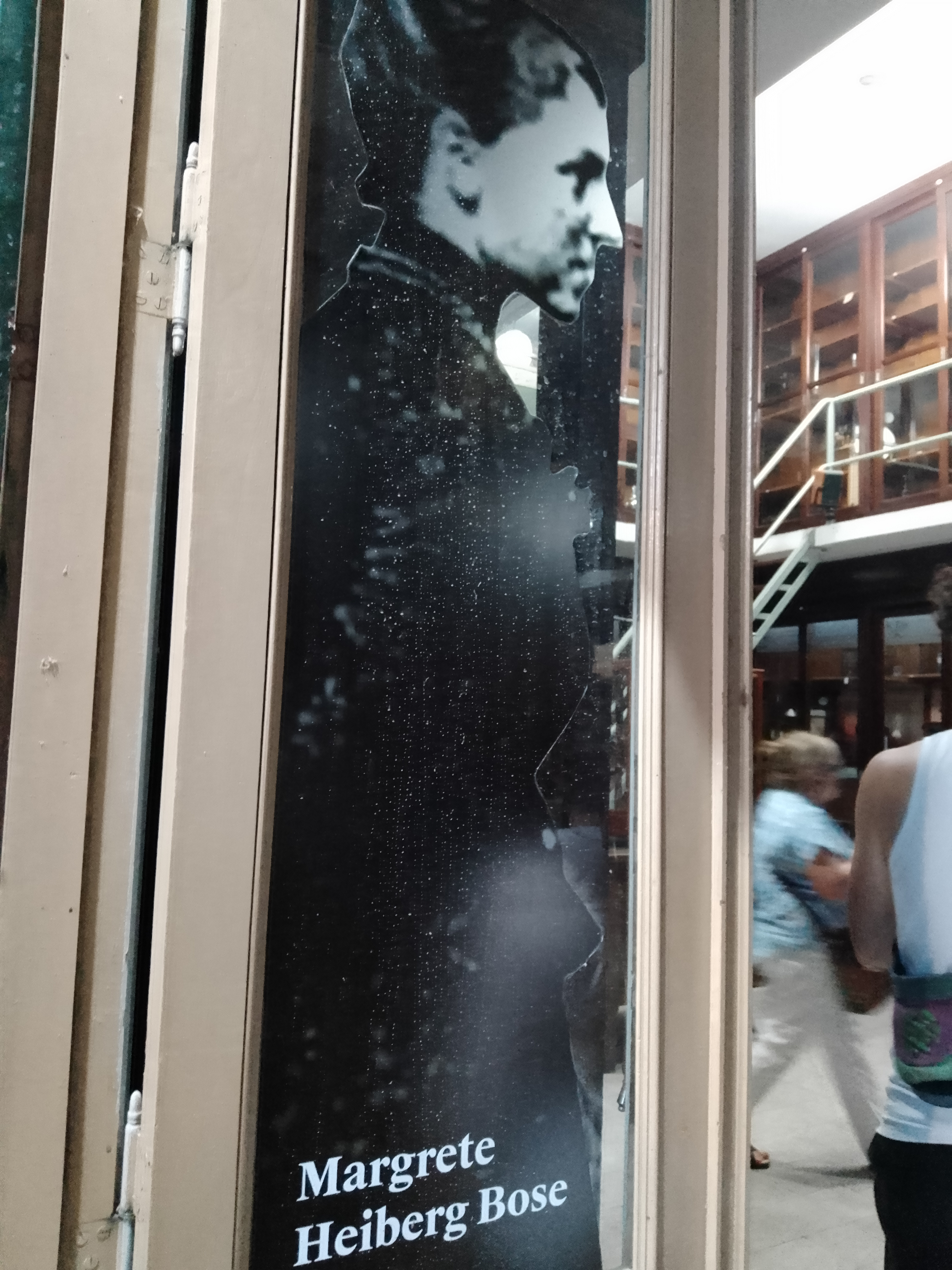
Margrete Heiberg Bose

Margrete Elisabeth Heiberg Bose (1865–1952) was an Argentine physicist of Danish origin, the first woman to receive a chemistry degree in Denmark, possibly the first female physicist to work in Latin America, and one of the first in the Americas.

== History ==
Born in Sorø, Denmark, she studied philosophy, mathematics, and chemistry, graduating in 1901. She was the first female to be awarded an M.Sc. at the University of Copenhagen, also. She continued her studies with Walther Nernst in Göttingen, Germany. There she met Emil Bose, a German physicist with whom she married. They moved to Gdańsk where he was a professor and editor of the journal Physikalische Zeitschrift.

In the early 1900s there was an initiative to create a top-level national university, with a physics institute as a cornerstone, in the city of La Plata, Argentina. Emil Bose was offered the directorship of the institute. He arrived with Margrete in 1909, who was offered a position as well. Together they taught the first experimental physics courses in the country. In 1910 there was a large scientific meeting in Buenos Aires to celebrate Argentina's centennial with about 1000 participants, and Margrete was the only female participant.

Shortly after the institute was officially opened, Emil unexpectedly died of typhoid fever in 1911. Although Margrete was the senior physicist at the institution, the authorities decided not to appoint her director, deeming the position unsuitable for a woman. She returned to Germany in 1912 to Nernst's lab for a short stay and then again in 1915, where she had to stay until 1919 because of World War I. Although on leave from the University of La Plata, her position there was canceled due to financial problems. After the war she returned to La Plata and had to file a grievance to get her position back, which she eventually did. She continued her research and mentored many students. She became an Argentine citizen in 1937, and retired in 1941.
