= Idah Sithole-Niang =

Zimbabwean biochemist and educator

- Born: Idah Sithole; 2 October 1957 (age 69); Hwange, Zimbabwe
- Spouse: Sheikh Ibrahima Niang

Academic background
- Education: University of London; Michigan State University
- Thesis: (1988)

Academic work
- Institutions: The University of Zimbabwe
- Main interests: biochemist
- Notable works: cowpea crop improvement

Idah Sithole-Niang (born 1957) is a Zimbabwean biochemist and educator. Her main area of research has been viruses which attack the cowpea, one of the major food crops of Zimbabwe.

== Biography ==
Idah Sithole was born in Hwange, Zimbabwe, on 2 October 1957. She attended the University of London, on scholarship, earning a BS in biochemistry in 1982. When she was awarded a USAID Fellowship in 1983, Sithole chose to continue her education, studying plant and virus genetics. She earned a PhD in 1988 from Michigan State University (MSU) in Lansing, Michigan. She completed a post-doctoral fellowship at the Plant Research Laboratory at MSU researching the genetics of photosynthesis in cyanobacteria on the first William L. Brown Fellowship, awarded by the Resources Development Foundation. Returning to Zimbabwe, she became a Lecturer at the University of Zimbabwe in 1992 on viruses which infect plants. Her chief area of research is the potyvirus, which attacks the cowpea, a legume which is a chief food crop of Zimbabwe. That same year, she married Sheikh Ibrahima Niang, a Senegalese professor of anthropology, whom she met at Michigan State University. They have a commuting marriage, as he works at the University of Cheikh Anta Diop in Dakar, Senegal. She was awarded a Rockefeller Foundation Fellowship for careers in Biotechnology between 1992 and 1995. She has continued teaching and researching, publishing numerous papers. In 2006 she was made Associate Professor at the University of Zimbabwe.

Sithole-Niang is in favor of genetic modifications to make cowpeas resistant to disease and believes that GMO versions of traditional crops are beneficial to developing nations. Working with the Network for the Genetic Improvement of Cowpea for Africa (NGICA) as a coordinator, she has consulted with other international experts, in part because of the lack of funding available from within Zimbabwe. She has served as both a member and a board member of numerous organizations including: Steering Committee Trustee of the African Women for Agriculture and Research and Development (AWARD) Programme, the American Association for the Advancement of Science, the American Society for Virologists, Oversight Committee of the Improved Maize for African Soils (IMAS), Selection Committee Chair of the Joshua Nkomo Scholarships, the New York Academy of Sciences, Vice Chair of the Research Council of Zimbabwe, Selection Committee for the Rhodes Scholarships in Zimbabwe and the Zimbabwe Academy of Sciences. Sithole-Niang is a Technical Advisor to the Program for Biosafety Systems for sub-Saharan Africa.

== Selected works ==
- Sithole-Niang, Idah (October 2001). "Future of plant science in Zimbabwe". Trends in Plant Science. 6 (10): 493–494. doi:10.1016/s1360-1385(01)02091-x. PMID 11590069.
- Mlotshwa, Sizolwenkosi; Verver, Jan; Sithole-Niang, Idah; Prins, Marcel; et al. (August 2002). "Transgenic Plants Expressing HC-Pro Show Enhanced Virus Sensitivity While Silencing of the Transgene Results in Resistance". Virus Genes. 25 (1): 45–57. doi:10.1023/a:1020170024713. PMID 12206307. S2CID 19367088.
- Mlotshwa, Sizolwenkosi; Verver, Jan; Sithole-Niang, Idah; Gopinath, Kodetham; et al. (October 2002). "Subcellular Location of the Helper Component-Proteinase of Cowpea Aphid-Borne Mosaic Virus". Virus Genes. 25 (2): 207–216. doi:10.1023/a:1020122104651. PMID 12416684. S2CID 25783145.
- Sithole-Niang, Idah; et al. (2003). Proceedings of a symposium on-the status of biotechnology research and priorities in Zimbabwe: May 9-10, 2000, Holiday Inn, Harare (Report). Harare, Zimbabwe: Biotechnology Trust of Zimbabwe.
- Eicher, Carl K; Maredia, Karim M; Sithole-Niang, Idah (2005). Biotechnology and the African Farmer. Lansing, Michigan: Michigan State University Press.
- Sithole-Niang, Idah (2004). "Putting GM technologies to work: public research pipelines in selected African countries". African Journal of Biotechnology. 3 (11): 564–571.
- Eicher, Carl K; Maredia, Karim M; Sithole-Niang, Idah (2006). Crop Biotechnology and the African Farmer. Washington, DC: International Food Policy Research Institute.
- Sithole-Niang, Idah, ed. (2013). Genetic engineering. Rijeka, Croatia: InTech. ISBN 978-9-535-11099-6.

== Bibliography ==
- Yount, Lisa (2007). A to Z of Women in Science and Math. New York, New York: Infobase Publishing. ISBN 978-1-4381-0795-0.
