= Taneko Suzuki =

Japanese biochemist and nutritionist (1926–2020)

- 鈴木たね子
- Born: 12 November 1926; Tokyo, Japan
- Died: 24 April 2020 (aged 93); Tokyo, Japan
- Occupations: biochemist, nutritionist
- Years active: 1947–2019
- Known for: developing Marinbeef

Taneko Suzuki (Japanese: 鈴木たね子, 12 November 1926 – 24 April 2020) was a Japanese biochemist and nutritionist who was an expert in protein chemistry and development of foods from fish proteins. Her work on transforming pollock into a hamburger-like substance received the Minister of Agriculture, Forestry and Fisheries Award in 1980. She was also honored with the Achievement in Processing and Technology Award of the Japanese Society of Fisheries Science in 1980, and the Director's Medal from the Japan Science and Technology Agency Commissioner in 1985.

== Early life and education ==
Taneko Suzuki was born on 12 November 1926 in Tokyo. (Note: Okazaki and Watabe give her birthdate as 12 November 1918 in their July 2020 article in Nippon Suisan Gakkaishi, but also state in the same article she was 93 years old. The same researchers give her birth year as 1926 in the article they published the same month in Fisheries Science. Her obituary in The Suisan-Keizai Daily News, states she was 93 years old, indicating her birth was in 1926. Stratton in his article from June 2012 gives her age at 86, which indicates she was born in 1926. As all other sources agree she was born in 1926 and Okazaki and Watabe state she was 93, it appears 1918 was a typographical error.) She studied pharmacy science at the Imperial Women's Medical and Pharmaceutical College and completed her degree in 1947.

== Career ==
Suzuki was hired in 1947 to work as a research assistant at the Ministry of Agriculture, Forestry and Fisheries's Experimental Station, where she remained for two years. In 1949, she began working at the Tokai Regional Fisheries Research Laboratory (now known as the National Research Institute of Fisheries Science). She briefly left the Tokai laboratory and worked at the Seikai Regional Fisheries Research Laboratory, but returned in 1957. in 1958, Suzuki completed her PhD in agriculture at Kyushu University. After a decade of conducting research there, she was promoted to chief biochemical researcher of the facility. She was promoted to section chief in 1971.

In 1976, Suzuki led a $100,000 research project which developed a concentrated fish-protein product from pollock called Marinbeef, which had the texture of hamburger and could be seasoned to taste like beef. Her discovery was seen as a potential new food for providing protein to the diet and was widely reported for its beneficial use in developing countries because of its high nutritional value and long shelf-life. The Japanese Society of Fisheries Science recognized her discovery with their Award for Achievement in Processing and Technology in 1980. That year, she was also honored with the Minister of Agriculture, Forestry and Fisheries Award.

Among her publications was the first book in English, Fish and Krill Protein: Processing Technology (1981), which introduced Japan's protein chemical research to the international community. The book focused on the science and technology of surimi, as well as its applications. Fluent in English, she was active in promoting fisheries science and spoke at international events promoting the use of fish proteins. She also acted as a consultant to the United Nations' Food and Agriculture Organization. Another influential book was 魚の味—水産食品の科学 (Taste of Fish—Science of Seafood, 1983), which presented seafood science in language written for the general public.

Suzuki became the director of the Biological Chemistry Division of Tokai laboratory in 1983, and in 1985, received the Director's Medal from the Japan Science and Technology Agency. The following year, she was appointed professor and dean of the Department of the Living Environment at Nihon University Junior College. In 1993, she retired and began working as a professor at the Kokusai Gakuin Saitama Junior College. After four years, she changed her status to visiting professor, continuing to lecture there until 2019.

== Affiliations and memberships ==
Suzuki was a member of the Prime Minister's Office Marine Development Council, Quality Review Committee of the Japan Fisheries Association. She served in various positions in the Japanese Society of Fisheries Science, including as manager of the Kanto branch from 1958 to 1982, auditor of the society from 1987 to 1990, and as a councilor between 1990 and 1991. In 2003, Suzuki became the first woman admitted as an honorary member of the Japanese Society of Fisheries Science.

== Death and legacy ==
Suzuki died on 24 April 2020 from colorectal cancer and a private funeral was held by the family. She is remembered for her work in advancing fisheries science and its food applications, as well as her mentorship of numerous students.

== Selected works ==
- 鈴木, たね子; 孝一, 神名; 武郎, 八木 (July 1978). "スケトウダラから魚肉タンパク濃縮物の製造〔新食品素材としての魚肉タンパク濃縮物の開発〕" [Manufacture of Fish Protein Concentrate from Walleye Pollock [Development of Fish Protein Concentrate as a New Food Material]]. Nippon Suisan Gakkaishi (in Japanese). 44 (7). Tokyo: Fisheries Society of Japan: 781–788. ISSN 0021-5392. OCLC 5181162588.
- Suzuki, Taneko (1981). Fish and Krill Protein: Processing Technology. London: Applied Science Publishers. ISBN 978-0-85334-954-9.
- 鈴木, たね子 (1983). 魚の味—水産食品の科学 [Taste of Fish—Science of Seafood]. 共立科学ブックス (in Japanese). Vol. 64. Tokyo: 共立出版. ISBN 978-4-320-00802-1.
- "The Nutritional Characteristics of Minke Whale Meat" in ISANA No. 8, 1993. http://luna.pos.to/whale/jwa_v8_suzu.html
