= Audrey Cahn =

Australian microbiologist and nutritionist

Audrey Josephine Cahn
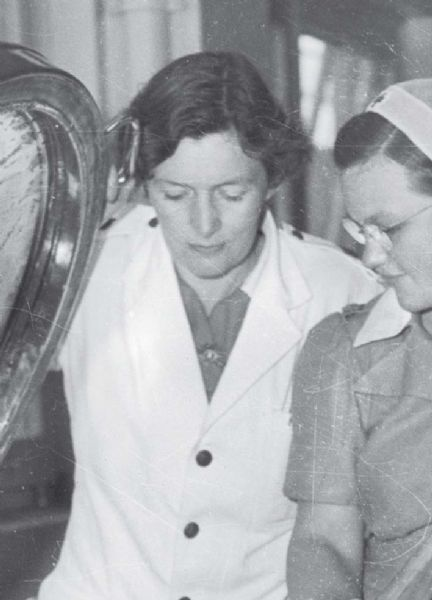
- Born: 17 October 1905; Parkville, Victoria, Australia
- Died: 1 April 2008 (aged 102); Hughes, Australian Capital Territory, Australia
- Education: University of Melbourne
- Partner: Leslie Cahn (m. 1930)
- Children: 2
- Scientific career
- Fields: Microbiologist, dietetics, nutrition
- Workplaces: University of Melbourne, St. Vincent's Hospital, Royal Perth Hospital, Australian Army Medical Corps

Signature
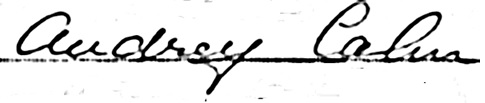

Audrey Josephine Cahn (17 October 1905 – 1 April 2008) was an Australian microbiologist and nutritionist.

The daughter of Prof. William Alexander Osborne, professor of physiology, biochemistry and histology, and Ethel Elizabeth Goodson, a medical practitioner and industrial hygienist, she was born Audrey Josephine Osborne at the University of Melbourne, where she also grew up. In 1928, she became the first woman to complete a Bachelor of Agricultural Science at the University of Melbourne, and, later received a diploma in dietetics from the university. She first worked as a microbiologist and food analyst for Kraft.

== Life ==
After her B.Ag.Sc., Cahn completed a Hospital Certificate of Dietetics at the newly opened Dietetics Unit at St. Vincent's Hospital. Before leaving, she rose to the post of Chief Dietician at the hospital. She then took a position at Kraft Walker dairy factory in Drouin as a microbiologist. She was employed as the first Chief Dietician for the Victorian Mental Hygiene Department, before spending a year at the Royal Perth Hospital. During World War II, she enlisted in the Australian Army Medical Women's Service on 11 February 1943. As part of the Australian Army Medical Corps she became Chief Dietician at the Heidelberg Military Hospital. By her discharge on 13 September 1946, Cahn had obtained the rank of Major. From 1947 to 1959, she was a dietetics lecturer at the University of Melbourne; from 1959 until 1968, when she retired, she was chief lecturer in nutrition and applied dietetics at the university.

She was a founding member of the Dietetics Association. Cahn was among the first experts to recommend reducing fat intake and substituting polyunsaturated fatty acids for saturated fats. Due to her significant contributions to medicine, Audrey Cahn Street in the Canberra suburb of Macgregor was named in her honour.

The research output of nutritional biochemist Cahn was well respected, having completed many studies in the field, including those undertaken during her time at the University of Melbourne from 1947 to 1968. These studies were important in examining the physical properties and energy values of common dietary foods so that calorie tables could be compiled. With colleagues in the anatomy department, she participated in the 17-year longitudinal study entitled "Child Growth in Melbourne (1954–71)". The study found that Australian children weighed more and got less physical activity compared with their peers United States and Britain.

== Personal life ==
In 1930, she married Leslie Cahn, an architect, they had two children but the marriage ended in divorce.

Audrey Cahn died in a retirement home in the Canberra suburb of Hughes at the age of 102.
