= Barbara Kegerreis Lunde =

American physicist and electrical engineer

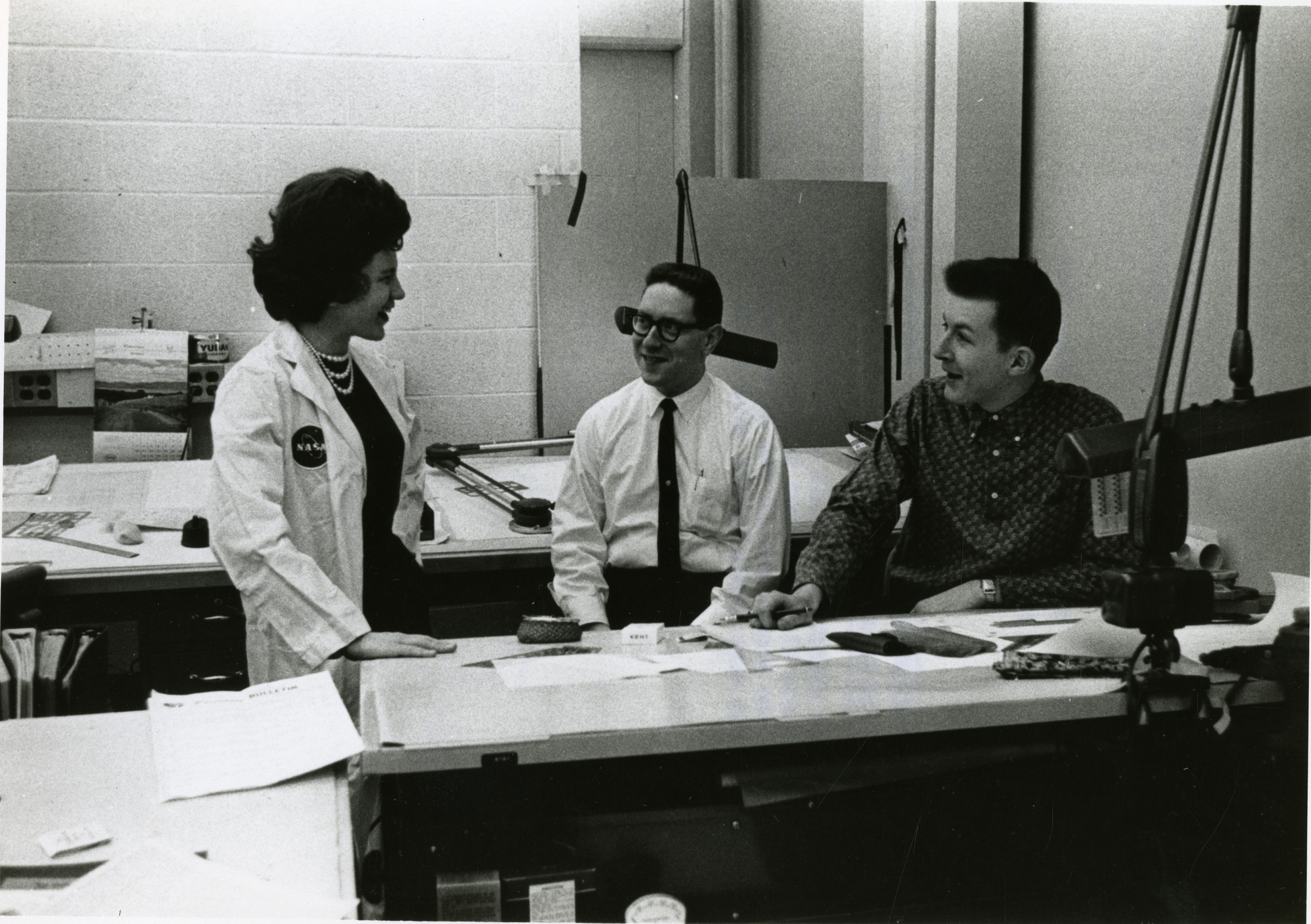
Barbara Kegerreis Lunde at NASA's Goddard Space Flight Center in 1964.

Barbara Kegerreis Lunde (born 1937) is an American physicist and electrical engineer. She worked for NASA in the 1960s, where she developed several instruments for various projects. Lunde became the second woman to graduate from Iowa State University with a doctorate in physics and the first woman in Iowa to become a professional electrical engineer.

== Biography ==
Lunde, the daughter of an electrical engineer, physicist and radiologist, grew up in Elmhurst, Illinois. She graduated from York Community High School in 1955. After high school, she earned a bachelor's and master's degree in physics at Northwestern University in 1957 and 1959, respectively. After graduation, Lunde was hired at MIT, working on the design of guidance systems for the minuteman missile. Also while at MIT, she developed and later patented a digital accelerometer. In 1961, she started working as an engineer at the Goddard Space Flight Center where helped develop a more simple jet propellant system for use in space. She also worked as project manager on the Reliable Earth Sensor. Early in her career, Lunde recalls that she was often the only woman at scientific conferences.

Lunde moved to Ames, Iowa where she helped build a radio station and where she also started studying at Iowa State University. The radio station, KLFM, co-owned with her husband Paul, was built and maintained by Lunde. Later in 1970, she became the second woman to graduate from Iowa State with a doctorate in physics. Lunde was also the first woman to become a professional electrical engineer in Iowa. Lunde also worked as an assistant professor at Iowa State. In the 1980s, another job emerged from her work in radio, when Lunde started creating underwear to protect wearers from electromagnetic radiation. She called the company Silver Lining.

Lunde started working as an aerospace technologist for the FAA in 2003 as a Training Specialist. She retired in 2013 and moved to Minneapolis. In 2015, she was honored with a Richard S. Alberg Distinguished Science and Technology Professional Award.
