= Tamara Oleksiyivna Grinchenko =

Ukrainian computer scientist (born 1938)

- Born: 23 February 1938 (age 88); Kochubiyiv village
- Education: Taras Shevchenko National University of Kyiv
- Occupation: Computer scientist
- Known for: Early Ukrainian cybernetics
- Spouse: Viktor Grinchenko

Tamara Oleksiyivna Grinchenko (in Ukrainian: Грінченко Тамара Олексіївна) (born 1938) was one of the early Ukrainian computer scientists in the field of cybernetics. She led the project to create the "first hypertext system in Ukraine." She was the lead researcher at the Institute of Telecommunications and Global Information Space. She is a member of the Association for Computerization of Education (USA) and is on the Board of the Glushkov Foundation.

== Biography ==
Grinchenko was born on 23 February 1938 in Kochubiyiv village, now in the Chemerovetskyi district, Khmelnytskyi region. She graduated from Taras Shevchenko National University of Kyiv in 1959, and in 1994, she defended her doctoral dissertation in Physical and Mathematical Sciences, with a specialty in Technical Sciences.

From 1956 to 1986, she worked at the Kyiv Institute of Cybernetics of the Academy of Sciences of the Ukrainian SSR. In 1969–1971, she was the lead designer, and in 1971–1986, she was the chief designer on a project developing "the world's first personal computer, MIR," an engineering calculation machine.

Beginning in 1986, she worked at the Kyiv Institute of Applied Informatics. Under Grinchenko's leadership, her group's researchers created its first hypertext system, called "GYPSY" (1991) in addition to several sites that were the first to put Ukraine on the Internet in 1996. The same group produced the then-novel CDs called "Meet Ukraine" (1999) and "Ukraine" (2000).

In 2003, she became a leading researcher at the Institute of Telecommunications and Global Information Space of the National Academy of Sciences of Ukraine, where she directed the development of high-level algorithmic languages for intelligent computers.

She gained a particular interest in Wikipedia. In 2010, together with her husband, Viktor Grinchenko, she wrote the article, "Wikipedia as an element of the culture of the information society" that appeared in the tenth issue of the Bulletin of the National Academy of Sciences of Ukraine. It explored Wikipedia's structure and its role in modern society, seeking "to draw the attention of the scientific community of Ukraine to the great social significance of the work on the creation and development of the Ukrainian segment of the electronic encyclopedia."

== Film roles ==
- In the 1960s, she appeared in the comedy film, Love and Friendship in the Stone Age, made by the staff of the V. M. Gluschkov Institute of Cybernetics

== Awards ==
- 1998 — V. M. Glushkov Prize of the National Academy of Sciences of Ukraine (for outstanding achievements in the field of cybernetics, general theory of computers and systems)
