= Dina Dahbany-Miraglia =

American-born Yemeni linguistic anthropologist

Dina Dahbany-Miraglia (born 1938, New York City) is an American-born Yemeni linguistic anthropologist.

She is an alumna of a girls-only Orthodox Ashkenazi yeshiva, Hunter College, and Columbia University, earning a Ph.D. (anthropology, 1983). Her work has focused on Yemenite Jews and her teaching on ESL. Dahbany-Miraglia served as a professor at Queensborough Community College (a branch of City University of New York) until her retirement.

== Marriages ==
Dina Dahbany married, firstly, to Joseph Miraglia in 1960 (license number 22535) in issued in Manhattan, New York. She married, secondly, to Steven Kutyna, on October 24, 2000, in Queens, New York.

== Publications ==
- Verbal protective behavior among Yemenite Jews, 1975
- The Yemenite Jewish community, 1980
- An analysis of ethnic identity among Yemenite Jews in the greater New York area, 1982
- Yemenite Jewish poetry, 1982
- American Yemenite Jewish dance : the oldtimers and their children, 1988
- Speaking American English well, 1999
