= Margaret Millington =

British mathematician (1944–1973)

- Born: 22 March 1944; Halifax, Yorkshire, England
- Died: 5 March 1973 (aged 28); Hanover, Germany
- Occupation: Mathematician

Margaret Hilary Millington (22 March 1944 – 5 March 1973) was an English-born mathematician.

She was born Margaret Hilary Ashworth in Halifax, Yorkshire, the daughter of the local assistant head postmaster. She was an undergraduate at St Mary's College, Durham and earned her PhD at the University of Oxford, where she was supervised by A. O. L. Atkin.

In 1968, she married Lieutenant A.H. Millington, an officer in the Royal Electrical and Mechanical Engineers. She was awarded a two-year Science Research Council Fellowship which allowed her to pursue research at any university. During her husband's two-year posting in Germany, she taught mathematics at an Army Education Centre there.

She died in Germany due to a brain tumour at the age of 28.

Although her career was cut short, in 1983, the London Mathematical Society organized a symposium on modular forms. During the symposium, the importance of her doctoral thesis and post-doctoral research became clear. The work that she had started during her fellowship was picked up and pursued by other mathematicians, leading to a resurgence in the field. Her research had dealt with modular forms, as well as subgroups of the modular group.

In a tribute to Millington, Atkin said "I have no doubt that, had she lived, she would have made exciting original contributions to a field which has at last come into its own again, after nearly a quarter century in the doldrums, and where there are now at least twenty first rate people of her generation working actively."
