= Jennie L. S. Simpson =

Canadian-American botanist (1894 – 1977)

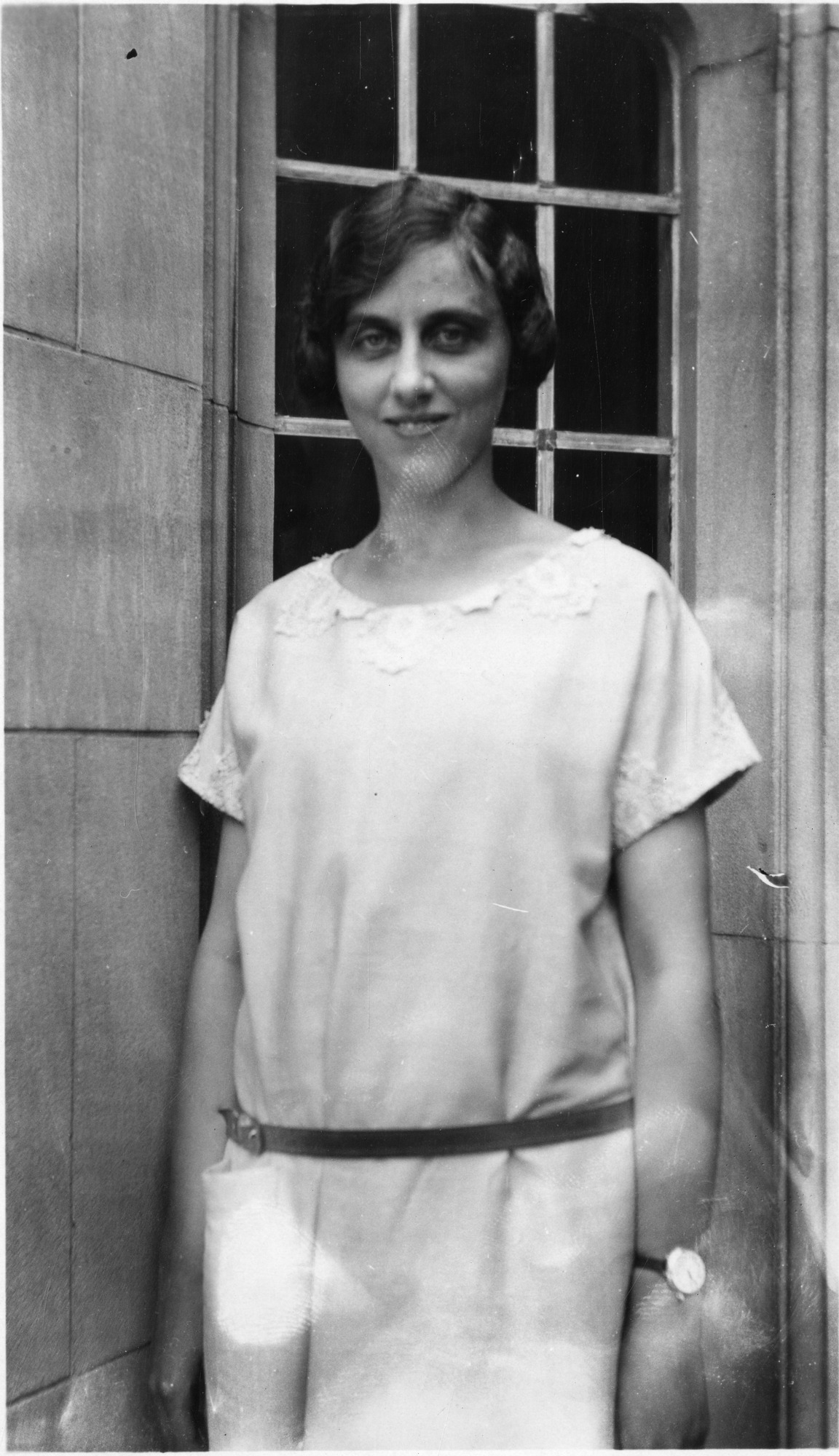
Jennie L. S. Simpson

Jennie Laura Symons Simpson (April 12, 1894 – July, 1977) was a Canadian-American botanist and geneticist. Between 1929 and 1962, she was the professor of botany at Hunter College. Most of her research activities were focused on marine algae.

== Biography ==
Jennie L. S. Simpson was born on April 12, 1894, in Waterloo, Ontario, Canada. She received all her degrees from McGill University (B.A., 1917; M.S., 1921; Ph.D., 1925). After receiving her doctorate in 1925, she started her teaching career as a lecturer in botany at McGill University. Later, she became an assistant professor and taught at the University of Toronto and at Swarthmore College.

In 1929, she joined as an assistant professor in the department of biology of Hunter College and retired there as Emeritus Professor in 1962. In Hunter College, she taught advanced courses in morphology and evolution of higher plants, and continued her research on the vascular anatomy of Cucurbitaceae. She gradually developed interest in marine algae. She and her students collected plant specimens extensively in the New York City area.

During summers, she used to work with several academic institutions and botanical laboratories including the University of Oregon, Cornell University, Iowa State University, Jodrell Botany Laboratory at Kew and Cold Spring Harbor Laboratory.

In 1953, she became the first woman president of Torrey Botanical Club. She was also associated with a number of professional institutions including the American Association for the Advancement of Science, the Botanical Society of America, the Genetics Society of America, the New York Academy of Sciences, and Sigma Xi.

In 1925, she married biochemist George Eric Simpson, who died in 1927. With her husband, she visited the University of Cambridge, England, and Kaiser Wilhelm Society in Germany. In 1931, she received United States citizenship.

After her retirement in 1962 from Hunter College, Simpson became a fellow of the San Diego Natural History Museum, where she bequeathed several thousand mounted plant specimens.

She died in July, 1977, in Chula Vista, California.
