= Deaths in September 1980 =

The following is a list of notable deaths in September 1980.

Entries for each day are listed alphabetically by surname. A typical entry lists information in the following sequence:

- Name, age, country of citizenship at birth, subsequent country of citizenship (if applicable), reason for notability, cause of death (if known), and reference.

== September 1980 ==
=== 1 ===
- Reg Bentley, 66, Canadian ice hockey player.
- Joseph E. Casey, 81, American politician, member of the U.S. House of Representatives (1935–1943).
- Arthur Greville Collins, 83, British-born American film director.
- Fritz Kiehn, 94, German politician and businessman.
- Frank LaManna, 61, American baseball player.
- Sten Lindroth, 65, Swedish historian.

=== 2 ===
- C. K. Alexander, 57, Egyptian-American actor, director and composer.
- Hal Brill, 66, American football player.
- Marcel Ciampi, 89, French pianist and music teacher.
- Richard Hanke, 70, German footballer.
- Don Howard, 67, Australian footballer.
- Nina Kandinsky, 81, Russian-Swiss art collector and curator, strangled.
- Frederick Macartney, 92, Australian poet and literary critic.
- Claude Ménard, 73, French Olympic high jumper (1928).
- Rudolf Nuude, 71, Estonian actor.
- George Reginald Starr, 76, British secret agent and engineer.
- Carl Springer, 69, American Olympic speed skater (1932).
- Samuel Wainer, 69, Russian-born Brazilian journalist.
- Josef Wendl, 73, German footballer.

=== 3 ===
- J.-Eugène Bissonnette, 88, Canadian politician, MP (1958–1962).
- Juan Luis Boscio, 84, Puerto Rican politician, heart failure.
- Sir Russell Brock, Baron Brock, 76, British surgeon and life peer.
- Frederic E. Hammer, 71, American politician and jurist.
- Percy Holloway, 80, Welsh lawn bowler.
- Car Norris, 87, New Zealand historian and lawyer.
- Barbara O'Neil, 70, American actress (All This, and Heaven Too, Gone with the Wind), heart attack.
- Dirch Passer, 54, Danish actor and comedian, cardiac arrest.
- Sir George Pickering, 76, English physician.
- Duncan Renaldo, 76, Romanian-born American actor (The Cisco Kid), lung cancer.
- Fabian von Schlabrendorff, 73, German jurist and World War II resistance member.

=== 4 ===
- Gaston Bonheur, 66, French journalist and writer.
- Lars Ehrnrooth, 83, Finnish Olympic equestrian (1924).
- Erast Garin, 77, Soviet actor and filmmaker.
- Wolfgang Gentner, 74, German nuclear physicist.
- Herman Fleischer Høst, 96, Norwegian physician.
- Walter Kaufmann, 59, German-American philosopher, translator and writer.
- Sir Edwin McCarthy, 84, Australian public servant and diplomat, brain aneurysm.
- Julio Pinto Riquelme, 94, Chilean politician and civil engineer.
- Yuan Jiahua, 77, Chinese linguist.
- Ladislav Zívr, 71, Czech sculptor.

=== 5 ===
- Don Banks, 56, Australian composer, chronic lymphocytic leukemia.
- Adrian Bell, 78, English journalist and crossword compiler.
- Eugène Colin, 81, French racing cyclist.
- Eric Cross, 74–77, Irish writer.
- Barbara Fallis, 56, American ballet dancer, cancer.
- Obrad Gluščević, 67, Croatian film director.
- Barbara Loden, 48, American actress (After the Fall, Splendor in the Grass) and director (Wanda), breast cancer.
- Jack Moriarty, 79, Australian footballer.
- Orfeo Paroli, 74, Italian Olympic rower (1932).
- Henryk Stenzel, 81, Polish-American paleontologist.
- Martin Sullivan, 70, New Zealand Anglican dean.

=== 6 ===
- Joe Bradford, 79, English footballer.
- Wilhelm von Tangen Hansteen, 84, Norwegian general.
- Bill Harwood, 59, Australian footballer.
- Sir Philip Hendy, 79, British art curator.
- Gus Ketchum, 83, American baseball player.
- Christopher Maltby, 89, British general.
- Hale Woodruff, 80, American painter.

=== 7 ===
- Bessie A. Buchanan, 78, American politician, member of the New York State Assembly (1955–1962).
- Joe Campbell, 55, Scottish footballer.
- Phayom Chulanont, 71, Thai politician and soldier.
- Ernst Cramer, 81, Swiss landscape architect.
- Billy Dunn, 69, Scottish footballer.
- Whitney Ellsworth, 71, American comic book editor and television producer (Adventures of Superman).
- Arvella Gray, 74, American blues, folk and gospel musician.
- Sir Reginald Manningham-Buller, 1st Viscount Dilhorne, 75, English politician, lord chancellor (1962–1964) and member of the House of Lords (since 1962).
- José Ortiz-Echagüe, 94, Spanish engineer and entrepreneur.
- Bobby Todd, 76, German actor.

=== 8 ===
- Eddie Butcher, 80, Irish musician.
- Joseph Alexander Cain, 60, American artist and art critic.
- John Christie, 80, English academic administrator.
- Bruce Dooland, 56, Australian cricketer.
- Joseph Finnegan, 75, American cryptanalyst.
- Maurice Genevoix, 89, French author.
- Sir Irvine Glennie, 88, British naval admiral.
- Bob Hassmiller, 63, American basketball player and coach.
- Robert M. Haverfield, 61, American jurist and politician, member of the Florida Senate (1965–1972).
- Oleg Grigoriyevich Kononenko, 42, Soviet cosmonaut, plane crash.
- Willard Libby, 71, American chemist, developer of radiocarbon dating, Nobel Prize laureate (1960), pulmonary embolism.
- Sir Geoffrey Shakespeare, 86, British politician, MP (1922–1923, 1929–1945).
- Charles Joseph Vogel, 81, American jurist.

=== 9 ===
- Harold Clurman, 78, American theatre producer and critic, cancer.
- William M. Colmer, 90, American politician, member of the U.S. House of Representatives (1933–1973).
- Richard Fogarty, 88, New Zealand rugby player.
- Fontana, 39, Brazilian footballer.
- John Howard Griffin, 60, American journalist, racial equality advocate and author (Black Like Me), complications from diabetes.
- Eusebia Hunkins, 78, American composer.
- Manzoor Ali Khan, 57–58, Pakistani singer, heart attack.
- J. Craig Ruby, 84, American basketball player and coach.
- Patrick W. Skehan, 70, American linguist and theologian.
- Sadashiva Tripathy, 70, Indian politician.

=== 10 ===
- Aldo Beckman, 45, American journalist, cancer.
- Bernard Fein, 53, American actor (The Phil Silvers Show) and television producer (Hogan's Heroes).
- Friedrich Hossbach, 85, German general, author of the Hossbach Memorandum.
- Virginia Kirkus, 86, American literary critic and magazine publisher (Kirkus Reviews).
- Lilla Leach, 94, American botanist.
- Honey Lott, 55, American baseball player.
- Wally McArthur, 68, English footballer.
- Ernest Neuhard, 76, French racing cyclist.
- Bob Perreault, 49, Canadian ice hockey player.
- Petre Rădulescu, 65, Romanian footballer.
- Hannes Torpo, 79, Finnish Olympic track and field athlete (1924).

=== 11 ===
- Junius Bibbs, 69, American baseball player.
- Harry Ebding, 73, American football player.
- Josl Gstrein, 62, Austrian Olympic skier (1948).
- Sir Harwood Harrison, 73, British politician, MP (1951–1979).
- Sir Alexander Hood, 91, British general, physician and politician, governor of Bermuda (1949–1955).
- Harry Hulihan, 81, American baseball player.
- Garth Mann, 64, American baseball player.
- Christian Mergenthaler, 95, German politician.
- Ernie Ovitz, 94, American baseball player.
- Jim Parker, 83, New Zealand rugby player and businessman.
- Arturo Villanueva, 84, Mexican Olympic sports shooter (1932).

=== 12 ===
- Magdalena Aebi, 82, Swiss philosopher.
- János Balogh, 88, Hungarian-Romanian chess player, namesake of the Balogh Defense.
- André Chéron, 84, French chess player and endgame theorist.
- Sir Rupert Cross, 68, English legal scholar.
- Hans Trier Hansen, 87, Danish Olympic gymnast (1912).
- Edward Francis Lynch, 83, Australian soldier and memoirist.
- Dušan Matić, 82, Serbian poet.
- Ole Olsen, 86, American baseball player.
- Lillian Randolph, 81, American actress (The Onion Field, Tom and Jerry, It's a Wonderful Life), cancer.
- Sam Ross, 79, American racing driver.

=== 13 ===
- Hoti Lal Agarwal, 79, Indian politician, MP (1952–1957).
- Fred D. Beans, 73, American general, heart attack.
- Alexander Fridlender, 74, Soviet pianist and composer.
- Franco Giuseppucci, 33, Italian criminal leader (Banda della Magliana), shot.
- Martin Hedmark, 83, Swedish architect.
- Pete Matevich, 60, American soccer player.
- Lillian Molieri, 55, Nicaraguan actress and dancer.
- Salvador Monroy, 75, Chilean politician.
- Charlie Pechous, 83, American baseball player.
- Joseph Suder, 87, German composer.

=== 14 ===
- Domingo Acedo, 82, Spanish footballer.
- Maxwell Bates, 73, Canadian painter and architect.
- Beverly Briley, 66, American politician and attorney, bladder cancer.
- Gérald Fauteux, 79, Canadian jurist, chief justice of Canada (1970–1973).
- Dorothy Boulding Ferebee, 81, American obstetrician and civil rights activist, heart failure.
- Vern Mullen, 80, American football player.
- Attilia Radice, 65–66, Italian ballerina.
- Alison Settle, 89, British fashion journalist.
- Col Stokes, 74, Australian footballer.
- Lars Erik Tirén, 79, Swedish Olympic pole vaulter (1920).
- Inga-Bodil Vetterlund, 66, Swedish actress.
- Bror Vingren, 74, Swedish Olympic wrestler (1932).
- Jim Willis, 89, Australian footballer.

=== 15 ===
- Olle Axelsson, 66, Swedish Olympic bobsledder (1952, 1956).
- Bill Evans, 51, American jazz musician, peptic ulcer disease.
- Virginia Faulkner, 67, American writer.
- Roberto Moscatelli, 85, Italian Olympic sailor (1924).
- Manuel Nieto, 88, Filipino politician, diplomat and footballer.
- Rodrigo Prats, 71, Cuban musician.
- Hans Schweitzer, 79, German artist and Nazi propagandist.
- Gudrun Slettengren-Fernholm, 71, Swedish sculptor.
- Gladys Nelson Smith, 90, American painter.
- Jimmy Steele, 70, American football player and coach.
- Jim Tyrer, 41, American football player, suicide by gunshot.
- Wally Webster, 85, English footballer.
- Sir Harry Wigley, 67, New Zealand pilot and tourism entrepreneur, heart attack.

=== 16 ===
- Joseph Anthony, 54–55, Indian footballer.
- Ludmila Červinková, 72, Czech opera singer.
- Chuck Elliott, 58, American football player.
- Everard Endt, 87, Dutch-American Olympic sailor (1952).
- Julio Franco Arango, 66, Colombian Roman Catholic prelate.
- Norbert Gajda, 46, Polish footballer.
- Frank Huffman, 65, American football player, heart attack.
- Ernie McCoy, 76, American basketball player and college athletic director.
- Georgina McCready, 91, Australian nurse.
- Abbas Mirza, 62, Bangladeshi footballer.
- Jean Piaget, 84, Swiss psychologist and education activist.
- Chucri Zaidan, 88, Ottoman-Brazilian physician.

=== 17 ===
- Harold Boas, 96, Australian architect and urban planner.
- Marcel Bonin, 75, French Olympic sports shooter (1936, 1948).
- Crawford Dunn, 61, American graphic designer.
- Joseph-Ernest Grégoire, 94, Canadian politician.
- Wilfrid McVittie, 74, British diplomat.
- Bill Noonan, 63, Australian footballer.
- Waldemar Seidel, 87, Australian pianist.
- Anastasio Somoza Debayle, 55, Nicaraguan politician, president (1967–1972, 1974–1979), shot.
- Babe Stapp, 76, American racing driver.
- Michael Strong, 62, American actor, stomach cancer.
- Uchimura Yushi, 82, Japanese psychiatrist and baseball executive.
- Sergei Varshavsky, 73, Soviet writer and art collector.
- Enid Warren, 77, British medical social worker, kidney cancer.

=== 18 ===
- Fredda Acker, 54, American baseball player.
- Frank Anderson, 52, Canadian chess player.
- Edward Croft-Murray, 73, British antiquarian.
- Homer Dudley, 83, American electronic engineer.
- Ralph Hosking, 53, Canadian ice hockey player.
- Konstantin Markov, 75, Soviet geomorphologist.
- Kurt Mendelssohn, 74, German-born British medical physicist.
- Walter Midgley, 68, English opera singer.
- Clark Polak, 42, American journalist and LGBTQ+ activist, suicide.
- Katherine Anne Porter, 90, American writer and novelist (Ship of Fools).
- Dick Stabile, 71, American jazz musician, heart attack.
- Leo Tankersley, 79, American baseball player.
- Rose Valland, 81, French art curator.

=== 19 ===
- Ralph Capron, 91, American baseball and football player.
- Ventura Gassol, 86, Spanish poet, playwright and politician.
- Jacky Gillott, 40, English broadcaster and novelist, suicide by drug overdose.
- Otto Landauer, 76, German-Canadian photographer.
- Sol Lesser, 90, American film producer.
- Stuart S. Murray, 82, American naval admiral.
- Myrtle Tate Myles, 94, American historian and poet.
- Erik Ohlsson, 95, Swedish Olympic sports shooter (1908, 1912, 1920).
- Alfred Rittmann, 87, Swiss volcanologist.
- K. B. Sundarambal, 71, Indian actress and singer.
- Tay Seow Huah, 46–47, Singaporean civil servant and historian, complications from brain surgery.
- Martial Henri Valin, 82, French general.
- Frank Villard, 63, French actor.

=== 20 ===
- Josias Braun-Blanquet, 96, Swiss botanist.
- Marie Bremner, 76, Australian opera singer.
- Clifford Bricker, 76, Canadian Olympic long-distance runner (1928, 1932).
- Michele D'Amico, 80, Italian politician.
- Louis Ford, 66, Welsh footballer.
- Hans Gilgen, 74, Swiss racing cyclist.
- A. Holly Patterson, 82, American politician, heart attack.

=== 21 ===
- Valdir Azevedo, 57, Brazilian choro musician.
- Eberhard von Breitenbuch, 70, German soldier and World War II resistance member, cancer.
- Walter S. DeLany, 89, American naval admiral.
- Carlos Garces, 79, Mexican footballer and Olympic sprinter (1924).
- Mick Gill, 80, Irish hurler.
- Carlos Gómez Sánchez, 56, Peruvian footballer.
- Gauhar Jamil, 54–55, Bangladeshi dancer.
- Robert Kean, 86, American politician, member of the U.S. House of Representatives (1939–1959), heart attack.
- Mária Mottl, 73, Hungarian paleontologist.
- Willem Ravelli, 88, Dutch opera singer.
- William Tate, 77, American academic administrator.
- Maurice Tauber, 72, American librarian.

=== 22 ===
- Ilya Baldynov, 77, Soviet general.
- Carlos Sylvestre Begnis, 77, Argentine politician, leukemia.
- Jimmy Bryant, 55, American country music guitarist.
- Margaret Cossaceanu, 87, Romanian-French sculptor.
- Raymond Dobson, 55, British politician, businessman and trade unionist, MP (1966–1970).
- Kenneth Elloway, 64, British musician and conductor.
- Peter Fuchs, 24, British Olympic skier (1976), traffic collision.
- Thomas B. Fugate, 81, American politician, member of the U.S. House of Representatives (1949–1953).
- Lou Holtz, 87, American actor and theatre producer.
- J. R. James, 67, British urban planner.
- Milly, 75, Italian actress and singer.
- Tommy Neill, 60, American baseball player.
- Jens Tangen, 83, Norwegian trade unionist.
- Lucy Wilson, 91, American physicist.
- Bohuš Záhorský, 74, Czech actor.

=== 23 ===
- Robert Cotner, 73, American historian.
- Alona E. Evans, 63, American legal scholar, heart failure.
- Jim Fouché, 82, South African politician, president (1968–1975).
- W. Jones Lane, 60, American politician, member of the Georgia House of Representatives (since 1961), complications from heart surgery.
- Geoffrey Latham, 93, English cricketer and colonial administrator.
- Fulton Lovell, 67, American conservationist, thyroid cancer.
- Clare Martin, 58, Canadian ice hockey player.
- Alan S. C. Ross, 73, British linguist.
- Houston Stackhouse, 69, American blues musician.

=== 24 ===
- Bill Ayers, 60, American baseball player, heart attack.
- Chester O. Carrier, 83, American politician, member of the U.S. House of Representatives (1943–1945).
- Harold Evans, 88, English cricketer.
- Pat Galvin, 69, Australian politician, MP (1951–1966).
- Clarence James Hickman, 66, British-Canadian mycologist.
- Theodor Luts, 84, Estonian-Brazilian filmmaker.
- Jack Murphy, 57, American sports journalist, lung cancer.
- Ernie Shore, 89, American baseball player.
- Jack Vickers, 72, English footballer.

=== 25 ===
- Richard Reeve Baxter, 59, American jurist, cancer.
- John Bonham, 32, English drummer (Led Zeppelin), pulmonary aspiration.
- Stig Cederberg, 66, Swedish Olympic boxer (1936).
- Charles H. Elston, 89, American politician, member of the U.S. House of Representatives (1939–1953).
- Omer Fortuzi, 85, Albanian politician.
- Lewis Milestone, 84, Russian-born American film director (All Quiet on the Western Front, Ocean's 11, Two Arabian Knights).
- Rose Finkelstein Norwood, 90, Russian-born American labor organizer, heart attack.
- Saville Sax, 56, American double agent.
- Antonio Talbot, 80, Canadian politician.
- Marie Under, 97, Estonian-Swedish poet.

=== 26 ===
- Christoph von Beschwitz, 82, German nobleman.
- Albert C. Bostwick Jr., 79, American jockey and racehorse owner, breeder and trainer.
- Anne Bowes-Lyon, 62, British noblewoman, heart attack.
- Bill Daly, 87, Australian footballer.
- Pat Hare, 49, American blues musician and convicted murderer, lung cancer.
- Arne Hoffstad, 80, Norwegian politician and newspaper editor.
- Gundolf Köhler, 21, German neo-Nazi terrorist, explosion.
- Roman Nowak, 80, Polish politician.
- Andy O'Connor, 96, American baseball player.
- H. Leslie Quigg, 92, American police officer, stroke.

=== 27 ===
- Ron Berking, 47, Western Samoan politician, bludgeoned.
- Werner J. Cahnman, 77, German-American sociologist, cancer.
- Jacques Favart, 60, French figure skater.
- Lawrence M. Gelb, 82, American chemist and businessman (Clairol).
- Pepe Guízar, 74, Mexican musician ("Guadalajara").
- Hans Henrik Holm, 84, Norwegian poet and folklorist.
- Horrie Miller, 87, Australian aviator.
- Dietrich von Saucken, 88, German general.
- Dexter Very, 90, American football player.

=== 28 ===
- Alfred de Baillet Latour, 78–79, Belgian nobleman.
- Čeněk Dobiáš, 61, Czech painter.
- Horace Finch, 74, English organist and pianist.
- Shirley Goldfarb, 55, American painter and writer.
- Axel Løvenskiold, 68, Norwegian painter and politician.
- Aryeh Sheftel, 74–75, Russian-Israeli politician, MK (1949–1951).

=== 29 ===
- Harold Alexander Abramson, 80, American physician.
- Sir Juxon Barton, 89, British colonial administrator, acting governor of Fiji (1936, 1938).
- Harold F. Blum, 81, American physiologist.
- Sir Alan Burns, 92, British colonial administrator and author.
- Miko Doyle, 69, Irish footballer.
- Charlotte Holzer, 70, German nurse and World War II resistance member.
- Mae Kernaghan, 79, American politician, member of the Pennsylvania House of Representatives (1957–1970).
- Kuo Cheng, 73, Taiwanese politician.
- Wilhelmus Luijpen, 58, Dutch philosopher.
- Peter Mahon, 71, British politician, MP (1964–1970).
- Áron Márton, 84, Hungarian Roman Catholic prelate, cancer.
- Bindo Maserati, 97, Italian automobile engineer and businessman (Maserati).
- Gerald Vincent McDevitt, 63, American Roman Catholic prelate.
- Eugene O'Brien, 83, Irish politician, TD (1932–1933).
- Piero Pisenti, 93, Italian politician and journalist.

=== 30 ===
- Robert O. Bare, 79, American general.
- Joseph Cootmans, 76, Belgian footballer.
- George E. Ericson, 78, American politician, member of the Minnesota House of Representatives (1951–1955).
- Gwon Seung-ryeol, 84–85, South Korean politician and lawyer.
- Anatoly Ktorov, 82, Soviet actor.
- Daniel J. MacDonald, 62, Canadian politician, MP (1972–1979, since 1980), pulmonary embolism.
- John McGuire, 69, American actor.
- George Waterston, 69, Scottish ornithologist and conservationist.
- Percy Wright, 87, Canadian politician, MP (1940–1953).
