= McVittie =

McVittie is a surname. Notable people with the surname include:

- Charles McVittie (1908–1973), English cricketer
- George C. McVittie (1904–1988), British mathematician and cosmologist
- Joan McVittie (born 1952), British schoolteacher
- Wilfrid McVittie (1906–1980), British diplomat

== See also ==
- 2417 McVittie, a main-belt asteroid
- McVitie
