= Cyril Edel Leonoff =

Canadian geotechnical engineer, historian, and author (1925–2016)

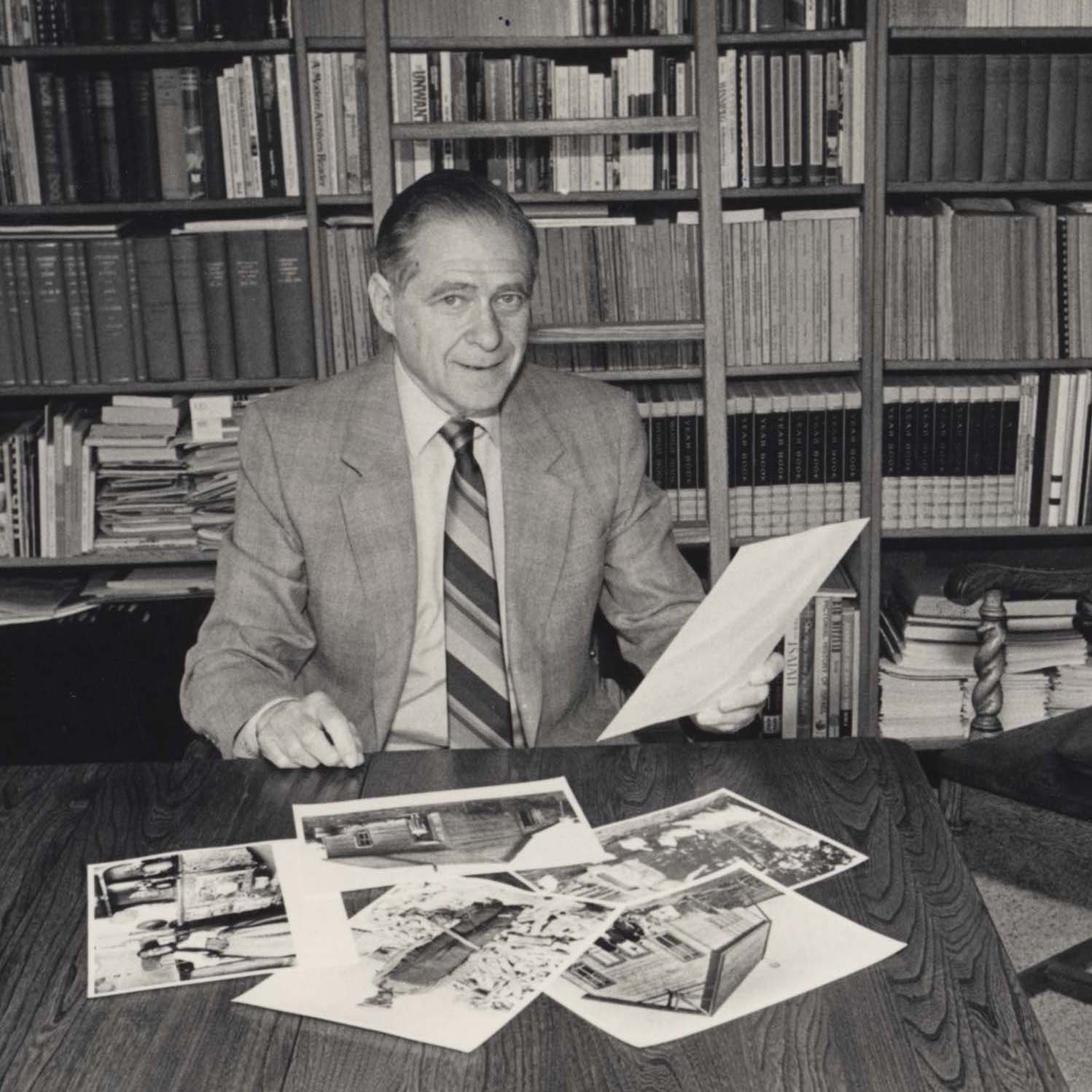
- Born: February 22, 1925; Winnipeg, Manitoba, Canada
- Died: April 7, 2016 (aged 91); Vancouver, British Columbia, Canada
- Education: University of Manitoba; University of Washington
- Occupations: Geotechnical engineer; historian
- Spouse: Faye Matlin (m. 1949; died 2011)

Cyril Edel Leonoff (February 22, 1925 – April 7, 2016) was a Canadian geotechnical engineer, historian, and author. He was the founding president of the Jewish Historical Society of British Columbia.

== Biography ==
=== Early life ===
Cyril Leonoff was born to Jewish parents William Leonoff and Rose Leonoff (née Brotman) in Winnipeg, Manitoba, Canada. His grandparents on both sides of his family came to Canada from Eastern Europe, the Leonoffs from Nicolaiov, Russia, and the Brotmans from the Polish town Bialykammin in Galicia. The Brotmans were among the first homestead families to settle in the farming colony of Wapella, Saskatchewan.

Leonoff attended schools in the North End of Winnipeg, where many of the students were Jewish. His Jewish education, however, was provided mostly by a private tutor. During his second year of classes at the University of Manitoba, he joined the Canadian Armed Forces and was stationed in Kingston, Ontario in the Signal Corps. Near the end of World War II in Europe, he was posted to the Signals Research establishment in Ottawa. He then returned to the University of Manitoba where he completed a bachelor's degree in civil engineering. During his studies, he met his future wife, Faye Matlin (1927–2011). Together they graduated in 1949, married on the eve of their graduation, and traveled to New Westminster, British Columbia, where Cyril worked for the Rivers & Harbours Branch of the Public Works Department.

=== Engineering career ===
The couple relocated briefly to Seattle where Leonoff completed his post-graduate education in geotechnical engineering at the University of Washington. In 1952, they returned to Vancouver, where Leonoff joined the one-year-old engineering firm of Ripley and Associates. Together with Charles F. Ripley and Earle J. Klohn, Leonoff co-founded Ripley, Klohn & Leonoff, Ltd., which grew nationally in the 1950s and 1960s, and internationally in the 1970s, to become Klohn Leonoff, Ltd. Leonoff was one of the earliest pioneer practitioners in British Columbia of soil mechanics and foundation engineering, a field known today as geotechnical engineering.

Throughout his thirty-six year engineering career, Leonoff made significant contributions to the profession, participated in engineering societies, and authored many technical papers. In 2000, he received the Vancouver Geotechnical Society Award for significant contributions to the local practice of geotechnical engineering and was inducted as a Fellow of the Engineering Institute of Canada.

=== Jewish Historical Society of British Columbia ===
In 1968, Leonoff met Eli Barish, one of three brothers who had grown up on the Wapella Farm Settlement where Leonoff's family had also originated. At a community event, Barish noticed Leonoff's daughter and commented "She looks like my old girlfriend on the farm... she looks like Rose Brotman", Leonoff's mother. Wanting to know more about this history, and realizing that there was no documentation of it, Leonoff began interviewing the Barish brothers and other alumni of the Jewish farm settlements throughout the Canadian prairies. The following summer he joined the Barish brothers on a visit to Wapella, where he took many photos and interviewed more aging farmers. This research resulted in Leonoff's first book, Wapella Farm Settlement: The First Successful Jewish Farm Settlement in Canada.

That same year, Leonoff was approached by Abe Arnold, then Executive Director of the Winnipeg chapter of Canadian Jewish Congress, and former editor of the Vancouver-based community newspaper, The Jewish Western Bulletin. A long-time history buff, Arnold was working to establish a Canadian Jewish Historical Society and a network of regional Jewish historical societies. He encouraged Leonoff to lead the BC society. Co-sponsored by CJC and the National Council of Jewish Women, a meeting was held on November 26, 1970 to establish the Jewish Historical Society of British Columbia. Leonoff was elected president of the new society.

The Historical Society's oral history program expanded rapidly with the involvement of new volunteers drawn largely from the ranks of the National Council of Jewish Women. These interviews led to Leonoff's next book, Pioneers, Pedlars, and Prayershawls: The Jewish Communities in British Columbia and the Yukon, published in 1978.

=== Mountain View Cemetery ===
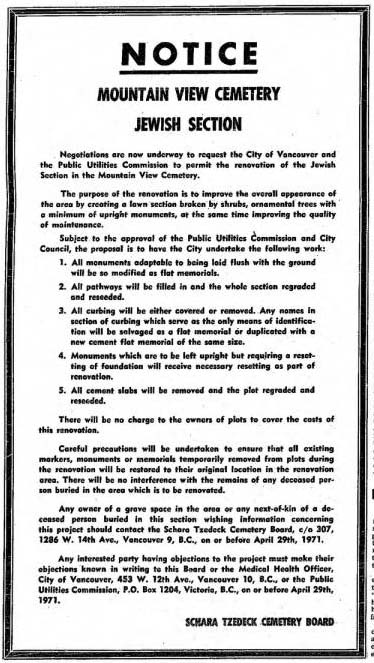
Public Notice announcing proposed renovations in the Jewish section of Mountain View Cemetery, April 8, 1971.

In April 1971, a notice appeared in the Jewish Western Bulletin, alerting the community to proposed renovations planned for the Jewish section of Mountain View Cemetery. Consecrated in 1892, this section of Mountain View Cemetery is the final resting place of many of the early pioneers of the Vancouver Jewish community, including Zebulon Franks, Simon and Samuel Petersky, Solomon Weaver, and Samuel, Rosina, and Maurice Gintzburger. In response to the growing community that now numbered over 600 families, the new Schara Tzedeck Cemetery was consecrated in New Westminster on November 3, 1929. Following the opening of this new cemetery, the Jewish section of Mountain View fell out of use and by 1971 was largely forgotten by the community.

In an effort to reduce the cost of maintaining the site, the committee responsible proposed laying the gravestones flat to allow a motorized lawnmower to pass through more easily. The Jewish Historical Society, still in its infancy, rallied in opposition to this plan and submitted a letter, penned by Leonoff, expressing these concerns. It was published in the Jewish Western Bulletin on April 21, 1971. "We are seriously concerned with the proposal to modify the monuments by laying them flush with the ground, as is the present vogue," Leonoff wrote. "We consider that not only will this disfigure the individual monuments but will also destroy the traditional character of the cemetery." Leonoff and his colleague Julius Shore were invited to a site visit with the Cemetery Board and Mountain View staff, with the result that the headstones remained untouched. A comprehensive restoration effort was initiated years later, in February 2013, and completed in May 2015.

=== Growing the Collection ===
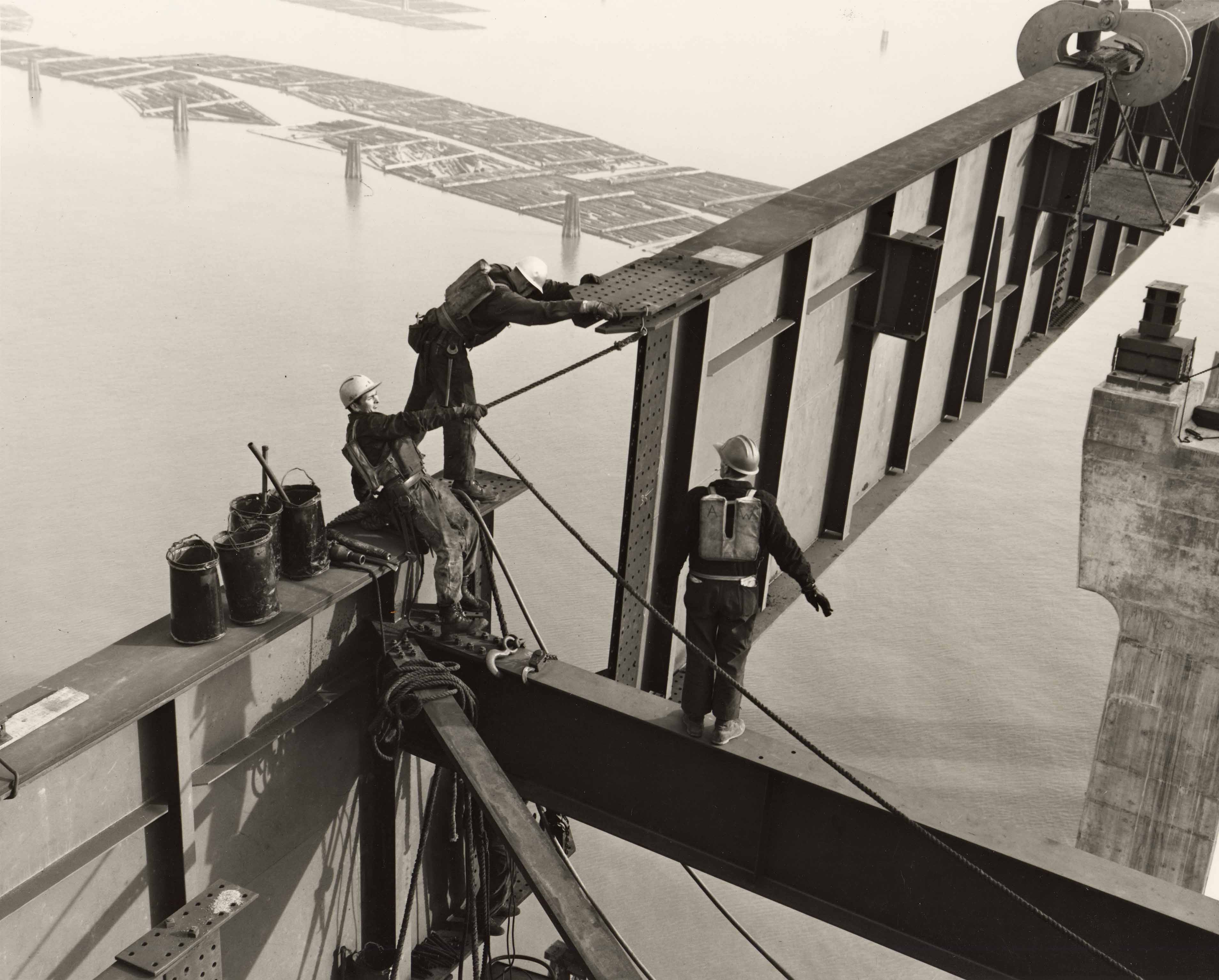
High-steel men working on the Port Mann Bridge above the Fraser River, Coquitlam, BC, February 23, 1962; LF02057, Otto F. Landauer, Photographer

For the ensuing 45 years, Leonoff remained actively involved in the work of the Jewish Historical Society, writing frequent articles and acquiring new material for the archives. A passionate hobby photographer, Leonoff sought out the collections of three major Jewish BC photographers: Leonard Frank, Otto Landauer, and Fred Schiffer, as well as the vast photographic collection of pioneer dentist Irving Snider. Together, these collections number over 300,000 items documenting vast portions of the history of BC, including the logging trade in the early 20th century and the post-war construction of Vancouver. They have served as source material for numerous exhibits produced by the Jewish Museum and Archives of BC, the successor organization to the Jewish Historical Society.

Leonoff documented the lives and work of Leonard Frank and Otto Landauer in a pair of books, An Enterprising Life: Leonard Frank Photographs, 1895-1944, and Bridges of Light: Otto Landauer of Leonard Frank Photographs, 1945-1980. The first of this pair was widely acclaimed, was a finalist for the B.C. Book Prize, and won the City of Vancouver Heritage Award and the Alcuin Society Design Award.

Leonoff won additional accolades for his other writings, notably the Margaret McWilliams Medal of the Manitoba Historical Society for his 1985 essay, "The Jewish Farmers of Western Canada". Leonoff was also the 2007 recipient of the Louis Rosenberg Distinguished Service Award, awarded by the Association for Canadian Jewish Studies for a lifetime of scholarly achievement.

He continued writing on the history of Jews in Western Canada right up until the time of his death. Following his passing, Leonoff's family found on his desk notes for future writings.

== Select bibliography ==
- "The Emanu-El of Victoria, Vancouver Island", The Scribe Volume 32 (The Jewish Historical Society of BC, Vancouver, 2012)
- "The Rise of Jewish Life and Religion in British Columbia, 1858-1948", The Scribe Volume 28 (The Jewish Historical Society of BC, Vancouver, 2008)
- Pioneer Jews of British Columbia (2005)
- Bridges of Light: Otto Landauer of Leonard Frank Photos, 1945-1980 (Talonbooks, Vancouver, 1997)
- A Dedicated Team: Klohn Leonoff Consulting Engineers 1951-1991 (Bi-Tech Publishers, Richmond, 1994)
- An Enterprising Life: Leonard Frank Photographs 1895-1944 (Talonbooks, Vancouver, 1990)
- "The Sylvesters of British Columbia", The Scribe Volume 4 (The Jewish Historical Society of BC, Vancouver, 1980)
- Pioneers, Pedlars and Prayer Shawls: The Jewish Communities in British Columbia and the Yukon (Sono Nis Press, Victoria, 1978)
- Wapella Farm Settlement: The First Successful Jewish Farm Settlement in Canada
