= Fernholm =

Fernholm is a Swedish surname. Notable people with the surname include:

- Daniel Fernholm (born 1983), Swedish ice hockey player
- Simon Fernholm (born 1994), Swedish ice hockey player
- Stefan Fernholm (1959–1997), Swedish discus thrower and shot putter

== See also ==
- Gudrun Slettengren-Fernholm
