= Chelsea Township, Kansas =

Chelsea Township Butler County, Kansas
- Township
- Location within Butler County

- Location within Kansas
- Coordinates: 37°55′10″N 096°39′56″W
- Country: United States
- State: Kansas
- County: Butler

Area
  - Total: 107.21 sq mi (277.68 km^{2})
  - Land: 100.6 sq mi (260.6 km^{2})
  - Water: 6.59 sq mi (17.08 km^{2}) 6.15%
- Elevation: 1,431 ft (436 m)

Population (2000)
  - Total: 190
  - Density: 1.9/sq mi (0.73/km^{2})
- Time zone: UTC-6 (CST)
  - Summer (DST): UTC-5 (CDT)
- FIPS code: 20-12750
- GNIS ID: 474400
- Website: County website

Chelsea Township is a township in Butler County, Kansas, United States. As of the 2000 census, its population was 190.

== History ==
Chelsea Township was organized in 1876. The township was named by a settler from Boston after Chelsea, Massachusetts. Some sources give it as the birthplace of painter Gladys Nelson Smith.

== Geography ==
Chelsea Township covers an area of 107.21 square miles (277.7 km^{2}) and contains no incorporated settlements. According to the USGS, it contains one cemetery, Chelsea.

The streams of Cole Creek, Durechen Creek and Gilmore Branch run through this township.
