= Chucri Zaidan (São Paulo Metro) =

Monorail station in São Paulo, Brazil

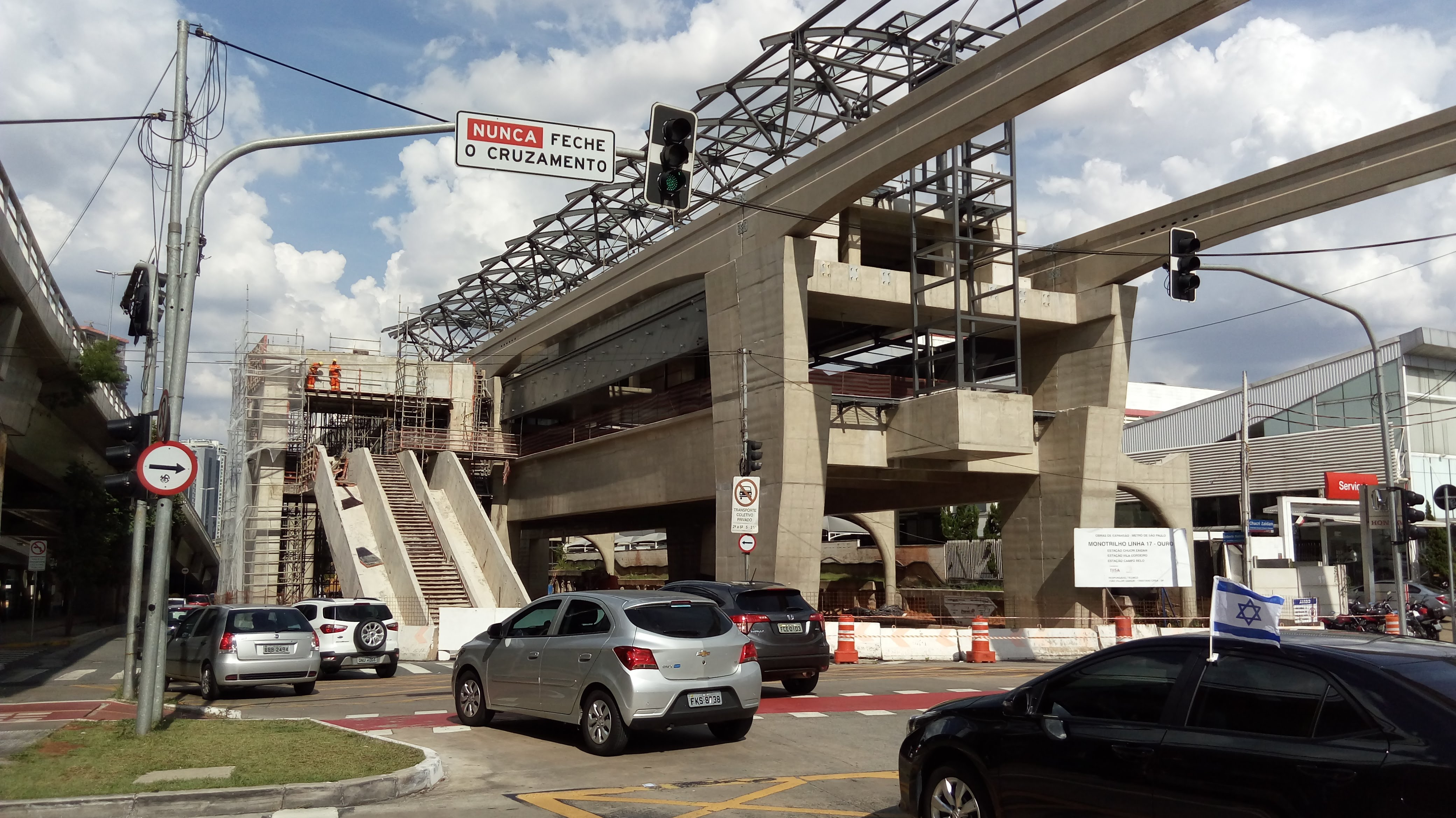

General information
- Location: Av. Jornalista Roberto Marinho × Av. Dr. Chucri Zaidan, Itaim Bibi; São Paulo; Brazil
- Coordinates: 23°36′50″S 46°41′43″W
- Owner: Government of the State of São Paulo
- Operator: Motiva Linhas 5 e 17
- Platforms: Island platforms
- Connections: Água Espraiada Bus Transfer Station; Berrini Bus Corridor

Construction
- Structure type: Elevated
- Accessible: Yes

Other information
- Station code: CZD

History
- Opened: 31 March 2026

Services
Preceding station	São Paulo Metro	Following station
Morumbi Terminus	Line 17	Vila Cordeiro towards Aeroporto de Congonhas or Washington Luís
Track layout
Location

Chucri Zaidan is a monorail station of Line 17-Gold of Motiva Linhas 5 e 17 and connects Line 9-Emerald to Congonhas Airport.

Chucri Zaidan station is located in the crossing of Avenida Jornalista Roberto Marinho with Avenida Doutor Chucri Zaidan, which attends TV studios of TV Globo and ETEC Jornalista Roberto Marinho.

== History ==
Initially, in the São Paulo Metro expansion plans, Line 17-Gold should be open until 2014, connecting with São Paulo–Morumbi station of Line 4-Yellow, at the time that Morumbi Stadium was considered one of the hosts for 2014 FIFA World Cup.

After that, the promise of opening of the line was delayed to 2016, end of 2017, 2018, December 2020, mid of 2021, and, currently, to 2nd semester of 2022.

The construction of the station was resumed on June 20, 2016, along with construction in station Vila Cordeiro and Campo Belo. At the time, the construction of the stations was paralyzed for more than a year.

== Toponymy ==
Chucri Zaidan was a doctor of Syrian origin naturalized Brazilian, born in Damascus, Ottoman Empire on 29 October 1891. Had classes of Medicine in the Medical Sciences College of the American University of Beirut, graduating in 1916. He was medic official of the Ottoman army during World War I, and was made prisoner by the British army, being in Egypt until 1920. Migrated to Brazil in 1925 and was one of the first foreign medics to revalidate his diploma in the country. Placed himself in São Paulo, where he exercised obstetric medicine in Hospital Pró-Mater, at the same time he had a private clinic. His popularity, for attending to the poor for free, led to his receiving in 1966 the title of Paulistano Citizen of the Municipal Chamber of São Paulo. Died on 16 September 1980.

In his honor, Avenida Ao Longo do Dreno do Brooklin received the name Doutor Chucri Zaidan through the Municipal Decree n.° 18,226 of 22 September 1982.

== Station layout ==
P Platform level
P Platform level	Westbound	← toward Morumbi
P Platform level	Island platform, doors open on the left
P Platform level	Eastbound	toward Aeroporto de Congonhas/Washington Luís →
M	Concourse	Fare control, ticket office, customer service, Bilhete Único/TOP recharge machines
G	Street level	Exit/entrance
