= Berne, Germany =

Berne
- Municipality
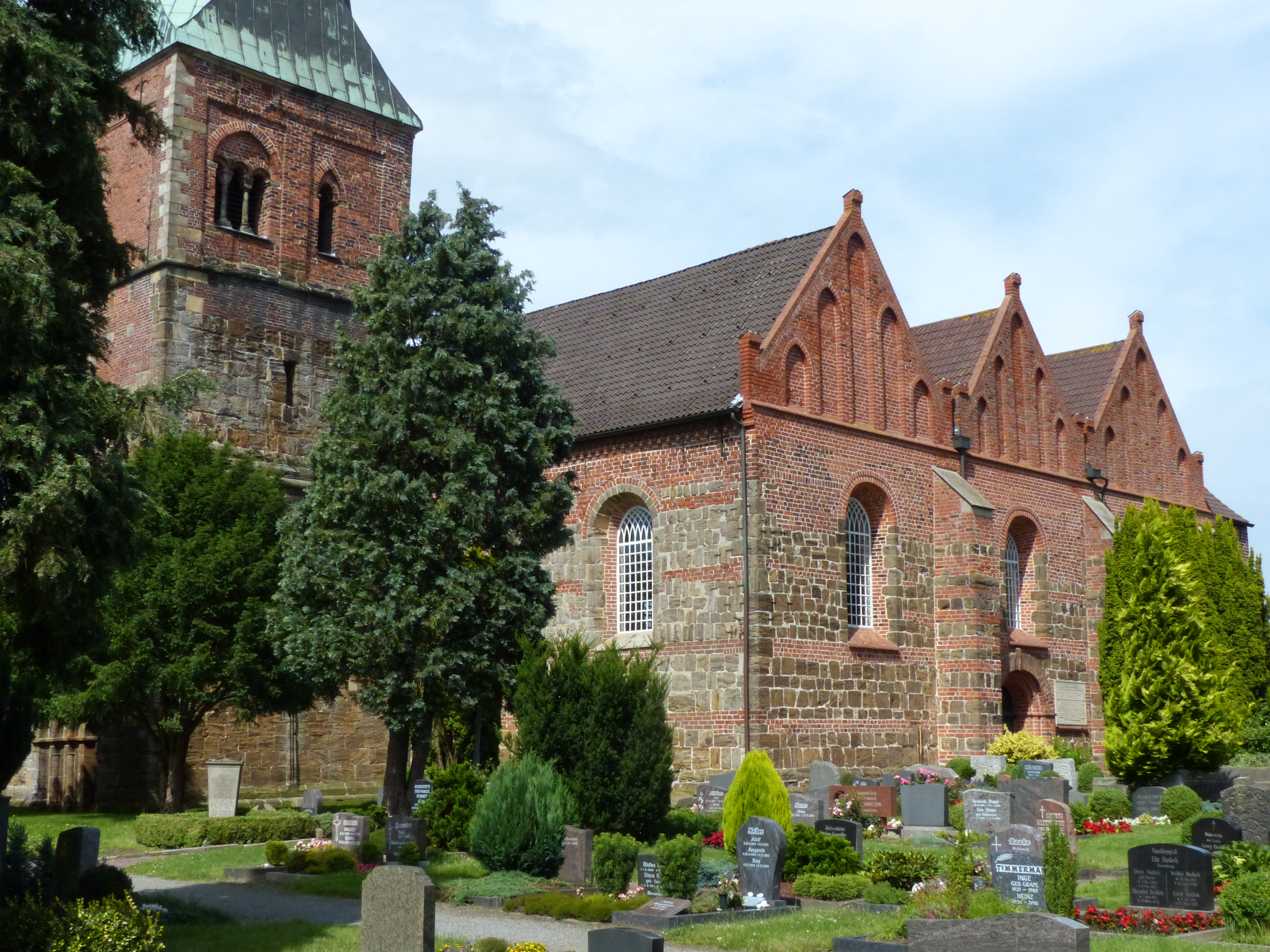
- Church of Saint Aegidius

- Coat of arms

- Location of Berne within Wesermarsch district
- Interactive map of Berne
- Location within Germany Location within Lower Saxony
- Coordinates: 53°11′N 8°29′E
- Country: Germany
- State: Lower Saxony
- District: Wesermarsch
- Subdivisions: 34 districts

Government
  - Mayor (2017–22): Hartmut Schierenstedt (Ind.)

Area
  - Total: 85.1 km^{2} (32.9 sq mi)
- Elevation: 6 m (20 ft)

Population (2025-12-31)
  - Total: 7,075
  - Density: 83.1/km^{2} (215/sq mi)
- Time zone: UTC+01:00 (CET)
  - Summer (DST): UTC+02:00 (CEST)
- Postal codes: 27804
- Dialling codes: 04406
- Vehicle registration: BRA
- Website: www.berne.de

Berne (German pronunciation: [ˈbɛʁnə]) is a municipality in the district of Wesermarsch, in Lower Saxony, Germany. It is on the left bank of the Weser, approximately 20 km east of Oldenburg and 25 km northwest of Bremen.

== Notable people ==
The Canadian photographer Leonard Frank (1870–1944) was born in Berne. It is also the birthplace of musician, producer and songwriter Dieter Bohlen.
