= McVitie =

McVitie is a surname. Notable people with the surname include:

- George McVitie (born 1948), English footballer
- Jack McVitie (1932–1967), English mobster

== See also ==
- McVitie's, a snack food brand
- McVittie
