= Jack Netzler =

Samoan politician (1940–2022)

Member of the Samoa Parliament for Individual voters
- In office January 1981 – 2 March 2001
- Preceded by: Ron Berking
- Succeeded by: Chan Chui Van Sung

Personal details
- Born: 25 April 1940
- Died: 2 August 2022 (aged 82)
- Party: Human Rights Protection Party

Jacob John Olaf Netzler (25 April 1940 – 2 August 2022) was a Samoan politician and cabinet minister. He was a member of the Human Rights Protection Party.

Netzler was born on 25 April 1940. He was from the villages of Motoʻotua and Alafua and was educated at Samoa College. He is a descendant of Carl Fritz Netzler, an early German immigrant to Samoa. In 1958 he began working for Burns Philp as a copra shed clerk, where he remained until 1964. He later became a farmer and entrepreneur. He was first elected to the Legislative Assembly of Western Samoa in a by-election in January 1981 following the murder of MP Ron Berking. He was re-elected at the 1982 Western Samoan general election, and at every successive election until his retirement in 2001. During his political career he served as Minister of Agriculture, Minister of Transport, and Minister of Public Works. In 1994 while Minister of Civil Aviation he was named in auditor-general Sua Rimoni Ah Chong's report over his role as chair of the board of Polynesian Airlines, which lost millions of dollars. Netzler later lost his cabinet position, and was replaced as chair of the board by Tuila'epa Sa'ilele Malielegaoi.

Netzler did not contest the 2001 election. He died on 2 August 2022, at the age of 82. He was given a state funeral.
