= Joseph Cootmans =

Belgian footballer

Personal information
- Date of birth: 17 September 1904
- Date of death: 30 September 1980 (aged 76)
- Position: Midfielder

International career
| Years | Team | Apps | (Gls) |
| 1926 | Belgium | 1 | (0) |

Joseph Cootmans (17 September 1904 – 30 September 1980) was a Belgian footballer. He played in one match for the Belgium national football team in 1926.
