= Sergei Varshavsky =

Russian (Soviet) writer and art collector

- Сергей Петрович Варшавский
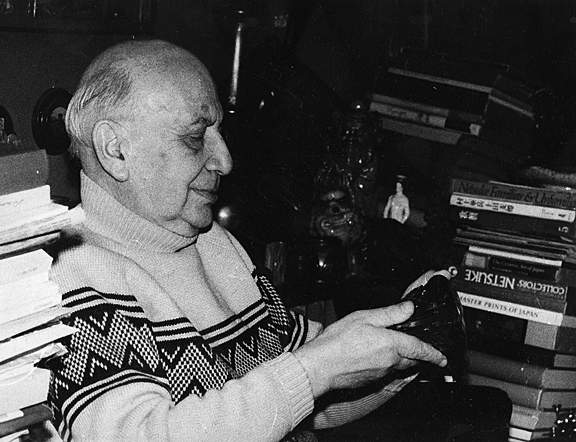
- Varshavsky in his study. Leningrad, 1970s
- Born: Sergei Petrovich Varshavsky; September 27, 1906; Odessa, Russian Empire
- Died: September 17, 1980 (aged 73); Leningrad, USSR
- Resting place: Preobrazhenskoe Jewish Cemetery in St.Petersburg, Russia
- Citizenship: USSR
- Education: Autodidact
- Occupations: Writer, art collector
- Spouse(s): Evgenia Vergilis, Lili Varshavsky
- Children: Lev, Yuri, Dmitry
- Writing career
- Language: Russian
- Period: 1930-1980
- Genre: Documentary prose
- Subjects: Art history, World War II
- Notable work: Ordeal of the Hermitage (Подвиг Эрмитажа)

Sergei Petrovich Varshavsky (Russian: Сергéй Пeтрóвич Варшáвский, (27 September (O.S. 14 September) 1906, Odessa, the Russian Empire – 17 September 1980, Leningrad, USSR) was a Russian (Soviet) writer and art collector.

== Early years ==
Varshavsky was born in 1906 in the southern port city of Odessa into an educated middle-class Jewish family. His father Pyotr Moiseevich Varshavsky was a physician, specialised in skin diseases and sexually transmitted infections. His mother Elza Filippovna Kalmeyer was descended from a large and prosperous family of textile merchants from the town of Grobiņa in Courland. In 1921, Varshavsky joined the Socialist Revolutionary Party. In 1921-22 he was arrested three times by the Odessa Government Extraordinary Commission (Cheka) and then moved to Moscow where he found a job as a proof-reader at several Komsomol-run publishers.

In 1923, after another arrest Varshavsky deserted the Socialist Revolutionary Party and moved to Yekaterinburg, where he worked as an editor at the Ural region publishing house Uralkniga. In October 1924 he returned to Moscow where he worked first as a secretary in the editor's office of the Moscow branch of the Leningrad publishing house Khudozhestvennaya Literaturа, then as a proof-reader at the publishing house Novaya Moskva and at the printers of the Der Emes publishers. Sergei Varshavsky also worked as a copyreader for the newspaper Vechernyaya Moskva until 1928.

== Writing ==
From 1928 to 1930, Varshavsky was on active military duty in Leningrad, serving in the Baltic naval aviation. Varshavsky edited the first air force newspaper, Vozdushnik Baltiki, and joined the Russian Association of Proletarian Writers (RAPP). In 1930, after naval discharge, he became an executive editor of the magazines Zalp and Stroyka. From 1932 until 1937 Varshavsky was in charge of literature and drama broadcasting at the Leningrad radio committee whilst serving as head of Critics and Bibliography at the newspaper Leningradskaya Pravda. He was a member of the Union of Soviet Writers from its foundation in 1934. Sergei Varshavsky published a number of works on history and literature, as well as many art, literary and history of art criticism pieces in Moscow and Leningrad newspapers and magazines. From April 1937 to the start of World War II he was editorial secretary of the Leningrad branch of the Union of Theatre Workers of the Russian Federation and an editor of the Leningrad film studio LenTechFilm.

From 1931 to the end of his life he collaborated with the writer B.Rest (which was the pen-name of Yuliy Isaakovich Shapiro) and published as co-authors. Their first major work — the book The Hermitage. — was published by the Iskusstvo publishers in 1939. They then wrote a book about the history of the Russian Museum, but its publication was prevented by the start of the Great Patriotic War. During the war, Varshavsky and B. Rest worked as war correspondents and took part in the defence of Leningrad, Sevastopol and of the Arctic while publishing articles and books about heroic naval aviation pilots.

However, one of their short stories An Incident Over Berlin, along with the writings of Akhmatova and Zoshchenko, was subjected to stern criticism in the infamous Communist Party Central Committee Ordinance of August 14, 1946 On the magazines 'Zvezda' and 'Leningrad', also known as Zhdanov Decree, after which the magazine Leningrad ceased to exist, while Varshavsky and B. Rest lost the opportunity to be published for five years and therefore could not make a living by writing.

After the hiatus, the first work of the co-writers was an essay On the Rafts published in magazine Zvezda in 1951. In the following years S.Varshavsky and B.Rest wrote and published three documentary novels: Ordeal of the Hermitage - their most significant writing, Near the Winter Palace and A Ticket for the Entire Eternity. Together with their first book The Hermitage this body of work tells readers the history of one of the largest art collections in the world from the time of its foundation by Catherine the Great in the 18th century until the end of the World War II.

The text of the novel Ordeal of the Hermitage was used by the publishing house Aurora to compile three illustrated albums about the history of the Hermitage museums during the siege of Leningrad.

== Collecting ==
Being banned from writing, Varshavsky started his art collection in 1946. It is likely that he was influenced by Julius Gens , the famous art collector and bibliophile from Tallinn, Estonia.

In the following 34 years, Varshavsky became a persistent and enthusiastic collector. He created impressive collections of English and French lithography from the first half of the 19th century (including Paul Gavarni, Hippolyte Bellangé, Richard Parkes Bonington, James Duffield Harding, Nicolas Toussaint Charlet), of the Japanese ukiyo-e woodblock prints from the Edo period (Harunobu, Hokusai, Hiroshige, Toyokuni, Kunisada, Kuniyoshi and many others), as well as art and craft items, in particular Japanese (netsuke, tsuba, etc.) and Chinese ornaments (snuff bottles, ceramics, lacquer, carved ivory). Apart from that he assembled a large library which consists of art history, fiction and reference volumes. His entire collection and library were all based at his modest ground-floor apartment in Leningrad.

Many said that visiting this flat was truly unforgettable. The main objects from the collection were at different times either sold or given as gifts by Sergei Varshavsky or his descendants to the Hermitage and Pushkin Museum and were exhibited many times Selected netsuke and Japanese woodblock prints from Sergei Varshavsky Collection are a part of the permanent exhibition of the Oriental Art Department at the State Hermitage. The most profound account of Sergei Varshavsky collecting spirit and practice can be found in an extensive essay by Yuri Varshavsky A Collector's Joyful Toil, Notes on My Father with a foreword by Boris Piotrovsky, Director of The State Hermitage Museum.
