= Otto Landauer =

Canadian photographer

Otto Fernand Landauer (October 3, 1903 – September 19, 1980) was a prominent Canadian photographer of German-Jewish origin, and proprietor of Leonard Frank Photos Studio from 1946–1980. He is regarded as one of the most significant photographers of Vancouver during the city's commercial and industrial development after World War II.

== Biography ==
=== Childhood ===
Otto Landauer was born to German-Jewish parents, Simon and Senta (née Seller) Landauer in the Bavarian capital of Munich in southeastern Germany. He enjoyed a comfortable childhood with his three siblings: older brother Leopold, younger brother Albert, and younger sister Johanna Henrietta, affectionately called Hansi.

He attended public school for four years and in preparation for one day running his father's wholesale textile business, enrolled in the Higher Commercial School of the Chief City of Munich. He graduated from their business program five years later, working casually for his father's company, Gebruder Landauer.

=== Life in Europe ===
Despite being in his youth during World War I, Landauer's fierce patriotism compelled him to join the Bavarian Defense Organization as a cadet. He continued to serve as a part-time volunteer in the Bavarian Group Commando after the war. He loved the beauty of his native land and spent a large amount of time traversing the mountains of the Karwendel Range with other members of the Männer Turn-Verein (Men's Athletic-Gymnastic Club) of Munich. Until 1927, when he was forced to reside more permanently in Munich due to his father's ailing health, Landauer spent time in the Swiss, Austrian, and Italian Alps, racing and working as a ski instructor for the German-Austrian Alpenclub.

During his time in the mountains, Landauer took up photography, for which he had discovered a passion. He captured images of alpine villages, skiers descending powdery mountains, and panoramas of mountain ranges, for which he won numerous amateur photography prizes. When he returned to Munich, however, it would be more than ten years before he was able to resume his hobby with much tenacity.

His father died March 28, 1928, leaving Landauer and his brother Albert to manage Gebruder Landauer which had taken a beating in the wake of the economic depression Germany faced after World War I. The company eventually rallied but faced a crushing and permanent in 1937 after the implementation of the Nuremberg Laws. The Nuremberg Laws stripped Jews and others considered undesirable by the Nazis of their German citizenship. Any rights that had previously enabled them to operate businesses or own land, in addition to many others, were revoked. After having been briefly jailed on falsified charges by the SS, Landauer fled Germany, skiing west through the Austrian Alps to Liechtenstein. In March 1939, he left Liechtenstein for Switzerland. The neutrality of Switzerland did not, however, guarantee his safety, and in 1941 Landauer immigrated to Portland, Oregon.

=== Life in North America ===
Landauer's brother Albert had already settled in Portland. Their sister Hansi had immigrated to Vancouver with her husband years earlier and was able to fund Landauer's passage to Portland by way of Cuba. Upon his arrival, he took up his old hobby of photography, eventually completing a year at the North Western School of Photography. Since arriving in Vancouver, Hansi and her husband befriended Bernard Frank, brother of the photographer Leonard Frank, who owned and operated Leonard Frank Photos Studio. In 1946, two years after Leonard had died, Bernard needed to sell the business. At the urging of both Bernard and Hansi, and with a $1500 loan from his brother-in-law, Landauer purchased the studio. Now the owner of a business in Canada, Landauer was able to enter the country as a permanent resident.

In 1952, he met his future wife Barbara. Despite his Jewish heritage, they were married by a priest in St. Andrew's Roman Catholic Cathedral in Victoria, British Columbia on August 9, 1954, the same year Landauer attained Canadian citizenship.

== Death and legacy ==
Until his death in 1980, Otto Landauer was hired to document the construction of many landmark buildings and structures in Vancouver. Cyril Leonoff says Landauer was:

"proud of Vancouver, felt strongly that his photographs were a continuum in the history of the city, and he had an archivist's determination that the photos he produced with such care, like those of his predecessor Leonard Frank, should be preserved for posterity."

Recently, his photographs of the Second Narrows Bridge collapse (now the Ironworkers Memorial Second Narrows Crossing), originally taken for a Royal Commission, have been used in two publications, Falsework by Gary Geddes, and Tragedy at Second Narrows: The Story of the Ironworkers Memorial Bridge.

== Technique and repertoire ==
Landauer worked predominantly in black and white; although he worked with colour photography later in his career, he always felt it was relatively inferior to black-and-white photography. Similarly, he felt that large-format cameras provided better-quality photographs than light, automated equipment. It was only in his later years, due to health concerns, that he switched to lighter equipment.

Construction photographs he was contracted to photograph include: Second Narrows Bridge (Ironworkers Memorial Second Narrows Crossing), Oak Street Bridge, Granville Street Bridge, Port Mann Bridge, The General Post Office at 349 West Georgia Street, Queen Elizabeth Theatre, Playhouse Theatre, United Grain Growers Pier, Air Terminal Building at Vancouver International Airport, Various buildings at the University of British Columbia including the Forest Products Laboratory, the Fine Arts Centre, and the Wesbrook Building, Simon Fraser University's Academic Quadrangle and Convocation Mall.

Today, the Jewish Museum and Archives of British Columbia, administered by the Jewish Historical Society of British Columbia (JHSBC) hold the Otto Landauer Photo Collection in the Leonard Frank Photos Studio fonds. They were acquired in 1985 when the JHSBC purchased them from Barbara Landauer after the City of Vancouver Archives and the Vancouver Public Library (VPL), who had been working as a team, were unable to procure the asking price. The VPL does, however, hold a significant collection of Leonard Frank negatives and photographs which Landauer sold to them in 1965.
