= Eugène Colin =

French cyclist

Personal information
- Born: 6 January 1899
- Died: 5 September 1980 (aged 81)

Cycling career
- Sport: Cycling
- Role: Rider

Eugène Colin (6 January 1899 – 5 September 1980) was a French racing cyclist. He rode in the 1920 Tour de France.
