= Ilya Baldynov =

Soviet major general

Ilya Vasilievich Baldynov
- Илья Васильевич Балдынов
- Born: 2 July [O.S. 3 August] 1903; Moloevsky ulus, Irkutsk Governorate, Russian Empire (now Bulusa village, Ekhirit-Bulagatsky District, Ust-Orda Buryat Okrug, Irkutsk Oblast, Russia)
- Died: 22 September 1980 (aged 77); Moscow, Russian SFSR, USSR
- Military career
- Allegiance: Soviet Union
- Branch: Soviet Army
- Service years: 1925–1955
- Rank: Major General
- Conflicts: Sino-Soviet conflict; Khuvsgul Uprising; World War II; Eastern Front; Soviet–Japanese War
- Awards: Hero of the Soviet Union

Ilya Vasilievich Baldynov (Russian: Илья Васильевич Балдынов; 2 July 1903 – 22 September 1980) was a major general in the Soviet Army who received the title Hero of the Soviet Union in World War II.

== Early life ==
Of Buryat ethnicity, Baldynov was born on 1903. He was left an orphan at a young age and was brought up by relatives.

From 1920 he worked as a secretary of the Matveevsky village council in Irkutsk District.

From January 1921 he served in the Special Purpose Units in Irkutsk and participated in numerous operations against banditry, which was widespread at that time.

In October 1922 he was appointed as Deputy Chairman of the Barda volost executive committee in Irkutsk District.

In the 1920s Baldynov graduated from an adult school in Irkutsk and joined the Komsomol.

From October 1923 he worked in the Ekhirit-Bulagatsky District department of the State Political Directorate and from December 1924 he worked as a senior policeman in the village of Olzony. During these years, he also participated in the liquidation of numerous criminal gangs.

In April 1925 he was appointed as instructor of the Verkhneudinsky District committee of the Komsomol in the Buryat-Mongolian ASSR.

In 1925 he joined the Communist Party of the Soviet Union.

== Military career ==
In 1925 he joined the Red Army. Under the directions from the Buryat-Mongolian Regional Party Committee, he went to study at the Borisoglebsk-Leningrad Cavalry School and in September 1927 he was transferred to the North Caucasian Mountain Nationalities Military Cavalry School in Krasnodar.

After graduation he served as a platoon commander of the 74th Cavalry Regiment of the 5th Kuban Cavalry Brigade in the Transbaikal Military District.

In May 1929 he was transferred to the Separate Buryat-Mongolian Cavalry Division, which was one of the first national military units in the USSR and was stationed in Verkhneudinsk. During this time, he was appointed commander of a machine-gun platoon. His promotion was greeted with great enthusiasm by the Buryat population and the number of volunteers who wanted to join military service exceeded.

From October to December 1929 Baldynov took part in the military operations of the conflict over the East China Railway. For his heroism in the battle, he received the Order of the Red Banner, which was then the highest military award of the Soviet Union.

From December 1930 to July 1931 he studied military and political courses at the Kiev United Military School named after S. S. Kamenev, after which he was appointed political instructor of the squadron in the Separate Buryat-Mongolian Cavalry Division.

From December 1931 he served as adjutant of the division and from September 1932 he served as assistant chief of staff of the Separate Buryat -Mongolian Cavalry Regiment and for some time served as chief of staff of the regiment.

In the second half of 1932 the division was sent to Mongolian People's Republic and took part in the protection of important properties in Ulaanbaatar during the Khuvsgul Uprising, but did not directly participate in hostilities.

From March to July 1933 he studied at the cavalry advanced training courses for the officers of the Red Army in Novocherkassk.

In September 1934 he was sent to study at the Frunze Military Academy. For exemplary long-term service in the national units of the Red Army and by the decree of the Central Executive Committee of the USSR on 31 January 1936 he was awarded the Order of the Red Star.

In December 1936 after his graduation from the Frunze Military Academy, he returned to Ulan-Ude and was appointed chief of staff of the 11th Cavalry Regiment of the Separate Buryat-Mongolian Cavalry Brigade.

From September 1937 he temporarily served as commander of this regiment.

=== Great Purge ===
In July 1938, during the Great Purge, Baldynov was variously accused of having links to Pan-Mongolian counter-revolutionary center, Japanese and German intelligence. As a result, he was arrested and kept at a prison in Chita while under investigation.

In the first days of his arrest, the interrogators demanded that he write in detail that he was part of a spy group. When he refused, he was starved, sleep deprived and kept in a cold punishment cell where he could only stand or squat, by his interrogators. He was subjected to daily torture, which resulted him in sometimes losing consciousness.

During his imprisonment, he lost 20 kg and several of his teeth were knocked out during interrogations. In July 1940, he was released and was reinstated in the Red Army, where he was appointed as teacher of tactics at the Red Banner Cavalry Advanced Courses for the Red Army Command Staff in Novocherkassk.

=== World War II ===
==== Eastern Front ====
Following the German invasion of the Soviet Union in June 1941, he was stationed at Novocherkassk and in the autumn of 1941, he was appointed commander of the 190th Slavyansk Cavalry Regiment of the 72nd Kuban Cavalry Division in North Caucasian Military District. Following the division's formation on 4 January 1942, the division became part of the 51st Army of the Caucasus Front and was concentrated in Anapa. On 30 January 1942, he was transferred to the 47th Army of the Crimean Front and on the beginning of May, it was completely concentrated on the Kerch Peninsula in Crimea. A few days after the unit's arrival, an offensive operation known as Operation Bustard Hunt, which was launched by German 11th Army of General Erich von Manstein, began on the Kerch Peninsula. Baldynov's regiment fought near the village of Marfovka near Kerch, covering the retreat to the crossings across the Kerch Strait for the units of the 44th Army and suffered heavy losses. But during the days that the units of the 72nd Cavalry Division held the defense, which allowed tens of thousands of Soviet soldiers to safely evacuate. One of the last units to be evacuated was the 190th Cavalry Regiment, which lost more than half of its personnel. Before the crossing, the cavalrymen had to kill of all the horses of the regiment.

In July 1942, the 40th Separate Motorized Rifle Brigade was formed in the Kuban on the remnants of the 72nd Cavalry Division and Baldynov was appointed chief of staff of the brigade. When the German High Command had begun an offensive in the Caucasus on 3 August 1942, the brigade fought in the battles near the village of Kavkazskaya. From August 10 to September 15, the brigade fought against the complete encirclement by German troops, but retained combat readiness and broke through the encirclement, and went along the mountain paths through the Main Caucasian Range to Krasnaya Polyana. There, the brigade was included in the 18th Army, and it staunchly defended itself during the Tuapse Defensive Operation.

At the end of January 1943, Baldynov was appointed deputy commander of the 55th Guards Irkutsk Rifle Division of the 56th Army in the Transcaucasian Front. During this time, he participated in the North Caucasus and Krasnodar Offensive Operations. In April, the division was transferred to the 37th Army of the North Caucasian Front and on May 27, when breaking through a strong defensive enemy position at the Taman Peninsula, he was seriously wounded on the leg, head and back. As a result, he spent three months in the hospital.

In July 1943, Baldynov was appointed commander of the 109th Guards Rifle Division of the 10th Guards Rifle Corps in the 37th Army. In August 1943, the division conducted an offensive operation near the village of Moldavanskaya in the Krasnodar Krai and on September, it transferred to the 44th Army of the Southern Front, which later became part of the 28th Army of the 3rd Ukrainian Front. He successfully commanded the division in the Melitopol, Nikopol–Krivoi Rog, Bereznegovatoye–Snigirevka, Odessa, Belgrade, Debrecen, Budapest, Vienna and Prague offensives.

The division under his command distinguished itself during the liberation of Beryslav. For the liberation of Nikolaev, the division was awarded the Order of the Red Banner in April 1944. In the spring of 1944, after the liberation of Odessa, Baldynov was appointed the first Soviet military commandant of the city, and the division itself was awarded the Order of Suvorov, second class. He also distinguished himself at the completion of the encirclement of the enemy groupings in Budapest in November 1944 and the complete destruction of German troop formations in Buda.

==== Soviet–Japanese war ====
After V-E Day, Baldynov and the 109th Guards Rifle Division were transferred to Mongolia, where they were assigned to the 53rd Army of the Transbaikal Front. During Operation August Storm, Baldynov led his division in the Khingan-Mukden Offensive Operation, where they distinguished in combat by destroying much of the Japanese Kwantung Army. The division marched through the waterless steppes of the Chahar Province and the high mountain ranges of the Greater Khingan. They also crossed several rivers and captured the city of Tongliao.

By the decree of the Presidium of the Supreme Soviet of the USSR of September 8, 1945, for the "skillful leadership of military operations and for the exemplary performance of combat missions of command on the front of the fight against the Japanese militarists", Baldynov was awarded the title of Hero of the Soviet Union with the Order of Lenin and the Gold Star medal.

=== Post war ===
From May 1946, he continued to command the same division in the East Siberian Military District. In May 1946, the division was reorganized into the 6th Separate Rifle Brigade and was transferred to the West Siberian Military District in Tyumen. In March 1947, he left for Moscow to study higher academic courses at the Higher Military Academy named after K. E. Voroshilov. After completing his studies, he commanded the 23rd Separate Rifle Brigade in the Ural Military District from April 1948.

Baldynov was appointed senior lecturer in the department of tactics of higher formations at the Frunze Military Academy in November 1950. From February 1955, he was in the reserves. From 1946 to 1950, He served as people's deputy at the 2nd convocation session of the Supreme Soviet of the Soviet Union. After his retirement from the army, he carried out a lot of social, military and political work.

He lived in Moscow, where he died on 22 September 1980. He was buried at the Central City Cemetery in Ulan-Ude.

== Dates of rank ==
- Senior lieutenant, Red Army: 30 December 1935
- Captain, Red Army: 31 March 1937
- Major, Red Army: 4 August 1941
- Lieutenant colonel, Red Army: April 1942
- Colonel, Red Army: 18 June 1943
- Major general, Red Army: 8 September 1945

== Awards and honors ==
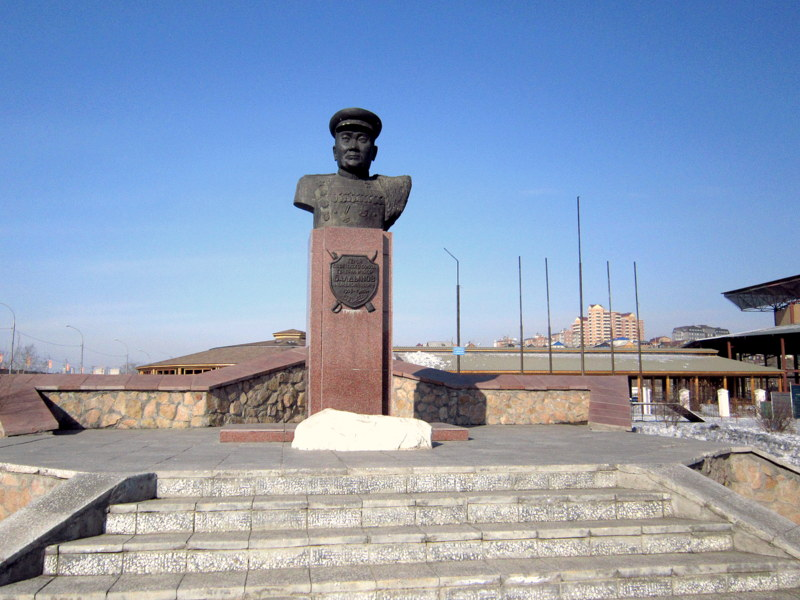
Bust honoring Baldynov in Ulan-Ude

Hero of the Soviet Union (8 September 1945)
Order of Lenin, twice (8 September 1945, 30 April 1947)
Order of the Red Banner, four times (31 October 1930, 30 March 1944, 3 November 1944, 21 August 1958)
Order of Kutuzov, 2nd class (28 April 1945)
Order of the Patriotic War, 1st class (1942)
Order of the Red Star (31 January 1936)
Medal "For the Defence of the Caucasus" (1944)
Medal "For the Capture of Budapest" (1945)
Medal "For the Capture of Vienna" (1945)
Medal "For the Liberation of Prague" (1945)
Medal "For the Victory over Germany in the Great Patriotic War 1941–1945" (1945)
Medal "For the Victory over Japan" (1945)
Jubilee Medal "Twenty Years of Victory in the Great Patriotic War 1941-1945" (1965)
Jubilee Medal "Thirty Years of Victory in the Great Patriotic War 1941–1945" (1975)
Jubilee Medal "In Commemoration of the 100th Anniversary of the Birth of Vladimir Ilyich Lenin" (1969)
Medal "Veteran of the Armed Forces of the USSR" (1976)
Jubilee Medal "30 Years of the Soviet Army and Navy" (1948)
Jubilee Medal "40 Years of the Armed Forces of the USSR" (1958)
Jubilee Medal "50 Years of the Armed Forces of the USSR" (1968)
Jubilee Medal "60 Years of the Armed Forces of the USSR" (1978)

- Foreign decorations from Bulgaria, Czechoslovakia, Hungary, Romania and Mongolia
- Honorary citizen of Beryslav, Budapest, Kherson, Odessa and Ulan-Ude
- In the village of Ust-Ordynsky in Irkutsk Oblast, a bust honoring him was erected and a school was also named after him.
- In 2005, a bust honoring him was erected in Ulan-Ude.
- Streets in Ulan-Ude and numerous localities in Buryatia are named after him.
- In April 2017, the book 'General Baldynov' (Генерал Балдынов) was published.
- In September 2021, Baldynov's ancestral home in Ulan-Ude was restored and opened to the public as a museum.
