= Joseph Anthony (footballer) =

Indian footballer (1925–1980)

Personal information
- Date of birth: 1925
- Date of death: 16 September 1980 (aged 54–55)
- Place of death: Bangalore, Karnataka, India

Senior career*
Years	Team	Apps	(Gls)
- East Bengal

International career
- India
- * Club domestic league appearances and goals

Joseph Anthony (1925 – 16 September 1980) was an Indian footballer. He competed in the men's tournament at the 1952 Summer Olympics.
