= Crawford Dunn =

American designer (1918–1980)

- Born: October 26, 1918; Bogalusa, Louisiana
- Died: September 17, 1980 (aged 61); Dallas, Texas

Crawford Boddie Dunn (October 26, 1918 – September 17, 1980) was a designer specializing in graphics and corporate communication. Dunn is known for his modern design aesthetic and holistic approach to graphic identity and communication, which he applied to a variety of clients in the Southwest. In a 1975 newspaper article, Dunn said of the range of his work, "This spectrum comprises the design of print graphics, architectural graphics, as well as corporate identity." A company brochure identifies another aspect of his work, "environmental signing design."

== Early life and work history ==
Dunn was born in Bogalusa, Louisiana, and attended Haverford College and the University of Alabama before graduating with a bachelor's degree in industrial design from the Art Institute of Chicago. Dunn arrived in Dallas in 1951 where he first worked at the Vought Corporation. Ten years later he opened his own design firm, Crawford Dunn, Inc. A newspaper article from 1963 identifies his firm as Ikonogenics, Inc., and a later article announced his affiliation with the RYA Group to form RYA Crawford Dunn Incorporated. Upon his death in 1980 his firm was known as R.Y.A. Graphics.

== Communication philosophy ==
Dunn's central philosophy of visual communication is expressed in his 1971 article "Alphasignal, Parasignal, Infrasignal: Notes Toward a Theory of Communication." In the article, he defines three interrelated levels of communication signals, ranging from a those containing pure information (alphsignal) to those colored or distorted by uncontrollable factors (infrasignal). Another concept developed by Dunn, ikonogenic, refers to the removal of all peripheral and secondary "noise" that lessens the impact of a message.

== Range of clients ==
Dunn worked with a plethora of organizations on various design projects, including the World Trade Center in Dallas (signage), Texas Stadium, Zale Corporation, North Texas State University, the University of Texas at Arlington, Marsalis Zoo, the Southland Corp., Richland College, NASA, S. Miller Companies, Datum Structures, Lamm Frates Co., Envirodynamics, Willhide Interiors, Amarillo National Bank, Bank of Commerce in Tulsa, City of Mesquite, Faxon, Inc., First National Bank of Abilene, Fort Worth Chamber of Commerce, Amon Carter Museum of Western Art, Parkland Memorial Hospital, Dalpark, Dallas Convention Center, University of Texas Southwestern Medical School, The Dallas Morning News, and WBAP Radio.

One of Dunn's signature projects involved a comprehensive redeployment of WBAP-TV's identity by remaking all its communication channels, including "visuals, graphics, sets, letterheads, logos, station advertising, program titles, and ... music."

Another prominent commission that Dunn completed was the logo for the City of Dallas, which was described as "simple, uncluttered, and modern." The same logo began to appear on police cars in 1973, in an effort to facilitate better communication between citizens and the police. Dunn said, "We feel that the police car should reflect the attributes of a good policeman, approachable instead of threatening, authoritative instead of imperious." In 2012, the Dallas Observer published an article recognizing the 40th anniversary of the logo.

Dunn also worked with a number of museums on publication design projects, including the first comprehensive catalog of art held by the Amon Carter Museum of Western Art.
