= Ron Berking =

Samoan politician

Member of the Legislative Assembly
- In office 1979–1980
- Succeeded by: Jack Netzler
- Constituency: Individual Voters

Personal details
- Born: 2 September 1933
- Died: 27 September 1980 (aged 47); Taufusi, Western Samoa
- Political party: Human Rights Protection Party

Ronald Gerd Berking (2 September 1933 – 27 September 1980) was a Western Samoan businessman and politician. He served as a member of the Legislative Assembly from 1979 until his death the following year.

== Biography ==
Berking was born in 1933, the son of Anna Lefagaoalii Saffings and German immigrant Rudolf Peter Berkings. He married Christina Ripley and the couple had nine children. He entered business and was manager of the Samoa Tropical Products firm. He contested the Individual Voters constituency in the 1979 elections and was elected to the Legislative Assembly, becoming a member of the opposition Human Rights Protection Party.

In September 1980 he was killed in an altercation at his office.
