= Ralph Hosking =

Canadian ice hockey player (1927–1980)

- Born: August 8, 1927 Toronto, Ontario, Canada
- Died: September 18, 1980 (aged 53) Banff, Alberta, Canada
- Height: 5 ft 9 in (175 cm)
- Weight: 180 lb (82 kg; 12 st 12 lb)
- Position: Defense
- Shot: Right
- Played for: Springfield Indians; Syracuse Warriors
- Playing career: 1944–1960

Ralph Edward Hosking (August 8, 1927 – September 18, 1980) was a Canadian professional ice hockey player who played 217 games for the Springfield Indians and Syracuse Warriors in the American Hockey League. He died in Banff, Alberta on September 18, 1980, at the age of 53.
