= Chucri Zaidan =

Brazilian physician

- Born: Chucri Zaidan; October 29, 1891; Damascus, Syria
- Died: September 16, 1980 (aged 88)
- Occupations: Physician, politician

Chucri Zaidan (October 29, 1891 – September 16, 1980) was a medical doctor in Brazil. He was born in the Ottoman Empire.

== Biography ==
Chucri Zaidan was born in Damascus, Ottoman Empire on 29 October 1891 and then migrated to Brazil in 1925, leaving Syria. He settled in São Paulo. He became a naturalized Brazilian.

Zaidan studied in the Medical Sciences College of the American University of Beirut and graduated as a physician in 1916. He was one of the first foreign physicians to revalidate his diploma in Brazil where he practised obstetric medicine in Hospital Pró-Mater. He became popular for looking after the poor for free; his popularity led to his receiving in 1966 the title of Paulistano Citizen of the Municipal Chamber of São Paulo.

In his honor, the Avenida Ao Longo do Dreno do Brooklin received the name Doutor Chucri Zaidan through the Executive Order no. 18,226 of 22 September 1982.

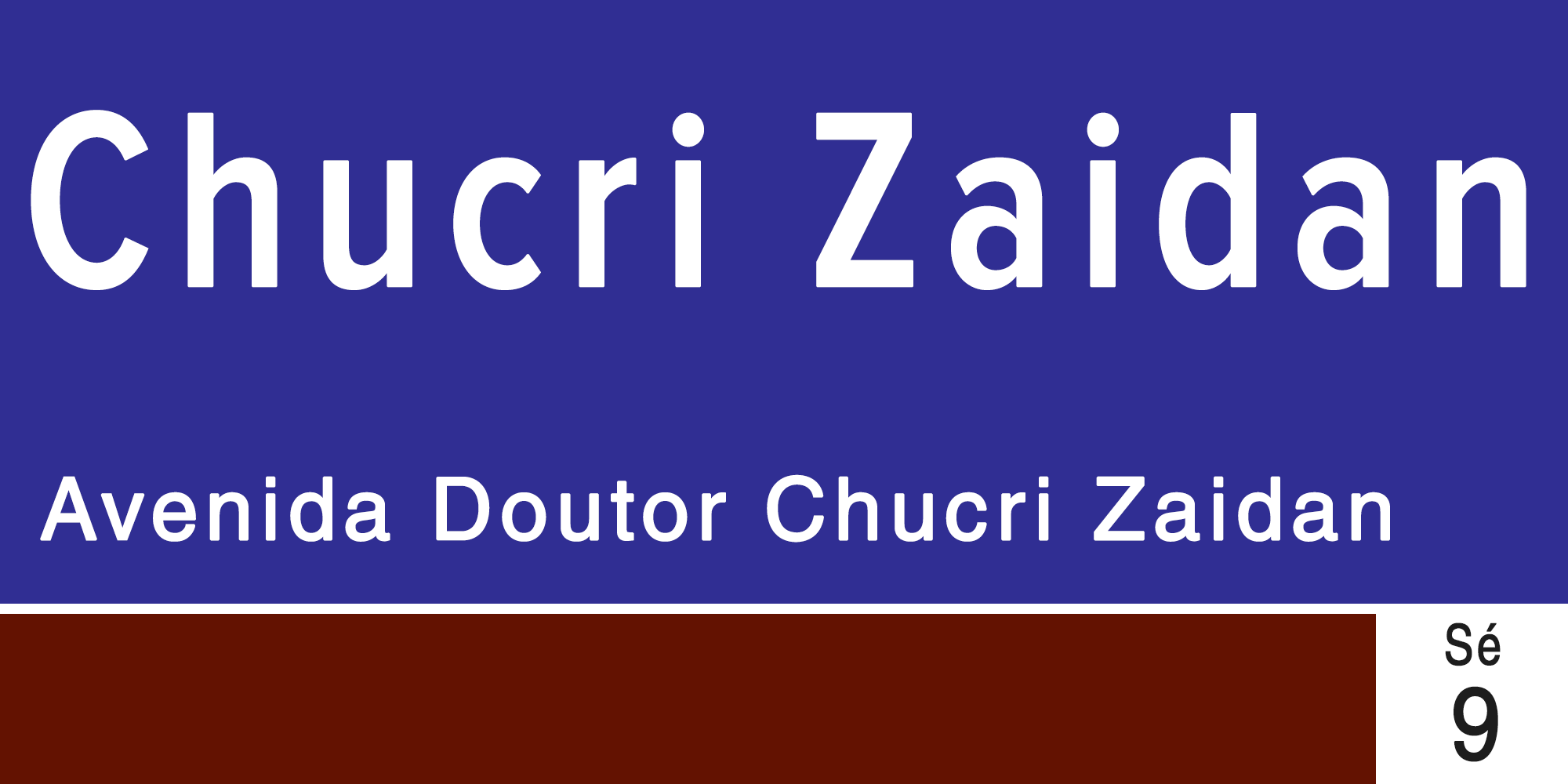
AvChucriZaidan Placa

A metro station is also named after him.
