= Mária Mottl =

Hungarian speleologist and paleontologist

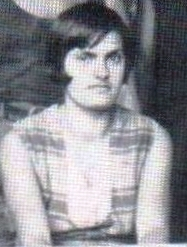
Mária Mottl

Mária Mottl (22 December 1906 – 21 September 1980) was a Hungarian speleologist and vertebrate paleontologist.

== Biography ==
Mária Mottl was born on 22 December 1906 at Budapest. She studied at the universities of Vienna, Berlin and Budapest. After completing her education, she joined Royal Hungarian Geological Institute, Budapest, and subsequently, after two years, she became a field paleontologist in the same institute. According to Fozy, Mottl was one of the “talented researchers” of the Royal Hungarian Geological Institute during that time. At the same time she produced a number of publications on caves and cave bears. Following World War II, she moved to Styria, Austria, where she joined Joanneum Museum in Graz. In September 1948 Mottl started “a systematic excavation of the Repolust Cave on behalf of the Joanneum” near Badlgraben. Mottl documented all the finds from this 100,000 year-old cave.

Also Mottl, along with Hubert Kessler excavated the Domica Cave, longest cave of the Slovak Karst National Park.

She died on 21 September 1980 in Graz.

== Notes ==
The Repolust cave was discovered in 1910 by a miner, which has been named after him. The site of Repolust cave was earlier planned for the mining of guano. However “mining never took place.”
