= Bill Noonan (Australian footballer) =

Australian rules footballer, born 1917

Personal information
- Full name: William De Vere Noonan
- Born: 28 February 1917; Euroa, Victoria
- Died: 17 September 1980 (aged 63); McKinnon, Victoria
- Original team: Fairfield / McKinnon
- Height: 185 cm (6 ft 1 in)
- Weight: 76 kg (168 lb)

Playing career^{1}
Years	Club	Games (Goals)
1940–41, 1944, 1946	Collingwood	42 (16)
1947–48	Oakleigh (VFA)	19 (32)
- ^{1} Playing statistics correct to the end of 1946.

William De Vere Noonan (28 February 1917 – 17 September 1980) was an Australian rules footballer who played with Collingwood in the Victorian Football League (VFL).

== Football ==
He later played for Oakleigh in the Victorian Football Association (VFA).

== Military service ==
Noonan's career was interrupted by his service in the Australian Army during World War II, where he served in New Guinea and was a leading member of the Wau Wombats football team in the services football competition.

== Death ==
He died at his home in McKinnon, Victoria on 17 September 1980.
