= Myrtle Tate Myles =

American poet and historian

Myrtle Tate Myles (May 5, 1886 – September 19, 1980) was an American poet and historian who published books about the history of Nevada, including Nevada's Governors: From Territorial Days to the Present (1972).

== Early life and education ==
Myles was born Mary Tate on May 5, 1886, in Grantsville, Nevada. Her parents Thomas and Esther Tate were early white settlers of Nevada. She was the second of four daughters. The family operated Tate's Stage Station for stage coaches carrying mail and passengers in Nye County between 1886 and 1901. The station served as an overnight stop between Austin and Belmont. Esther Tate organized the first school in the Grantsville area.

Sometime after 1905, Myles and her family moved to Manhattan, Nevada, where Esther Tate opened a boarding house, which Myles helped to run. The family then moved to Big Pine, California, and Myles attended high school in nearby Oakland.

In 1907, she married accountant John Henry Myles, with whom she had two children. Her son, Jack Myles, became a Reno city councilman, and her daughter Marjorie became a teacher.

== Career ==
In 1920, Myles took a correspondence writing course at the University of California, which reportedly led her to begin writing poetry and short stories about her childhood in Nevada. In the late 1920s, she served as associate editor of International Poetry Magazine of San Diego State University, which also published some of her poetry. In the early 1930s, poems by Myles also appeared in The Salt Lake Tribune.

Myles' husband died in 1932, and she began working as a correspondent for United Press International. She then moved to Reno, Nevada and began working for the Internal Revenue Service. Between 1948 and 1956, Myles conducted historical research for the Thomas Wilson Advertising Agency, and worked on an award-winning series of historical ads for the Harold's Club casino. Myles worked as a research librarian for the Nevada Historical Society from 1957 to 1969.

Myles retired at the age of 84. She was also a member of the Reno Poetry Club and the Century Club.

In 1972, Myles published a book of poetry titled The Lone Tree and Other Nevada Ballads, as well as a book about the governors of Nevada titled Nevada's Governors. She reportedly knew 13 of the 26 politicians who had served as governor of Nevada at the time the book was published.

Myles was named a Distinguished Nevadan by the University of Nevada on May 15, 1976, her ninetieth birthday. She died in Reno on September 19, 1980, at the age of 94.

== Bibliography ==
- Nevada's Governors: From Territorial Days to the Present (1972)
- The Lone Tree and Other Nevada Ballads (1972)
