= Michele D'Amico =

Italian politician (1900–1980)

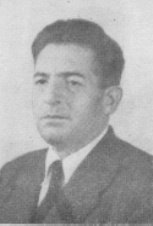
Michele D'Amico in 1946

Michele D'Amico (26 August 1900 in Ribera, Agrigento – 20 September 1980) was an Italian politician. He represented the Italian Communist Party in the Constituent Assembly of Italy from 1946 to 1948 and in the Chamber of Deputies from 1948 to 1953.

== Biography ==
A member and leader of the Italian Communist Party (PCI), he played a leading role in organizing the occupation of uncultivated land in the Ribera, Agrigento area, with the aim of expropriating it from large landowners and distributing it to the peasants.

In his capacity as Provincial Secretary of the Communist Federation of Agrigento, he pressured the Prefect of Agrigento to issue, pursuant to the Consolidated Law on Public Security, a decree assigning the occupied lands on grounds of serious Public policy doctrine.

In the general election of June 2, 1946, he was elected to the Constituent Assembly of Italy as a candidate for the Italian Communist Party (PCI) in the Palermo-Trapani-Agrigento-Caltanissetta constituency, receiving 8,793 votes.

On October 22, 1946, he organized the occupation of the “Donna Inferiore” estate in the Ribera area, with the aim of urging the implementation of the Agrarian Land reform for the allocation of land to farmers. On this occasion, the Honorable Michele D’Amico was charged along with Calogero Fera, a trade unionist from the Agrigento Chamber of Labor, for promoting and organizing a demonstration involving the occupation of land in a public place without notifying the public security authorities. At the hearing in December 1957 at the Magistrate’s Court of Ribera, the defendants were acquitted by Magistrate Dr. Alfredo Longo on the grounds that they had not committed the offense.

In the general election of April 18, 1948, he was elected to the Chamber of Deputies as a member of the Italian Communist Party (PCI) in the Palermo-Trapani-Agrigento-Caltanissetta constituency, where the Popular Democratic Front (Italy) won 243,886 votes and 6 seats.

On August 22, 1948, he held a public rally in Ribera’s main square, during which he harshly criticized the Fifth De Gasperi government; as a result, charges were filed against him, and the Chamber of Deputies was asked to authorize legal proceedings against him for the crime of subversive and anti-national propaganda and advocacy.

On October 3, 1952, he introduced a bill, together with Representatives Chiaramello, Belliardi, and Longoni, to establish the National Social Security and Welfare Fund for Surveyors.

In 2013, the municipal senior center, located within the municipal park, was named after Michele D'Amico, a member of the Constituent Assembly.
