= Bill Harwood =

Australian rules footballer

Personal information
- Full name: William David Douglas Harwood
- Born: 15 September 1920; Swan Hill, Victoria
- Died: 6 September 1980 (aged 59); Highton, Victoria
- Original team: Swan Hill
- Height: 178 cm (5 ft 10 in)
- Weight: 76 kg (168 lb)
- Position: Wing / Half Forward

Playing career^{1}
Years	Club	Games (Goals)
1940–41, 1946–48	Geelong	69 (16)
1942	South Melbourne	15 (5)
Total		84 (21)
- ^{1} Playing statistics correct to the end of 1942.

William David Douglas Harwood (15 September 1920 – 6 September 1980) was an Australian rules footballer who played with Geelong and South Melbourne in the Victorian Football League (VFL).
