= George E. Ericson =

American politician (1902–1980)

George E. Ericson (September 8, 1902 – September 30, 1980) was an American farmer and politician. He served in the Minnesota House of Representatives from 1951 to 1955.

== Early life and career ==
Ericson was borm in Argyle, Marshall County, Minnesota and graduated from Baudette High School in Baudette, Minnesota. He went to the United States Coast Guard Academy and the University of Minnesota. Erison lived in Pequot Lakes, Cass County, Minnesota with his wife and family and was a sheep and dairy farmer.

== Elected office ==
Ericson served two terms in the Minnesota House of Representatives, from 1951 to 1955.

He ran again for the Minnesota House of Representatives in 1956. The election results were contested and no candidate was seated. Ericson did not prevail in a special election to fill the vacant seat in 1957.

== Personal life ==
In 1969, Ericson moved to Saint Paul, Minnesota with his wife and family. Ericson died in Saint Paul, Minnesota and was buried in Rosemount, Minnesota.
