= Jim Willis (footballer) =

Australian rules footballer

Personal information
- Full name: James Willis
- Born: 13 September 1891; Allansford, Victoria
- Died: 14 September 1980 (aged 89); Coburg, Victoria
- Original team: Brunswick

Playing career^{1}
Years	Club	Games (Goals)
1914, 1918	Carlton	10 (1)
- ^{1} Playing statistics correct to the end of 1918.

Jim Willis (13 September 1891 – 14 September 1980) was an Australian rules footballer who played with Carlton in the Victorian Football League (VFL).
