= Robert Cotner =

American historian

- Born: November 1, 1906; Cleveland, Ohio
- Died: September 23, 1980 (aged 73); Austin, Texas
- Spouse: Elizabeth Marie Breihan
- Children: Catherine Elizabeth Cotner; Robert Crawford Cotner Jr.
- Parents: Thomas Ewing Cotner; Nina Dot Crawford Cotner

Academic background
- Education: Southern Methodist University; Baylor University (BA); Brown University (MA); Harvard University (PhD)
- Doctoral advisor: Frederick Merk
- Influences: Arthur Schlesinger Sr. Samuel E. Morison

Academic work
- Institutions: Henderson State College; Stetson University; University of Texas
- Notable works: James Stephen Hogg: A Biography (1959)

Robert Crawford Cotner (November 1, 1906 – September 23, 1980) was an American academic, author, editor, and historian best known for his biography of Texas Governor James Stephen Hogg.

== Early life ==
Robert Crawford Cotner was born in Cleveland on November 1, 1906. His parents were Thomas Ewing Cotner and Nina Dot Crawford Cotner, a retail salesman and a real estate agent, respectively. Cotner had two brothers, James Allen Cotner (b.1906) and Thomas Ewing Cotner, Jr., (b.1916). The Cotners moved to Dallas just two years later. Cotner grew up in Dallas and attended Southern Methodist University for two years before enrolling at Baylor University, where he earned a BA in history.

== Career ==
After graduating from Baylor in 1928, Cotner completed a master's degree at Brown University in just one year. He returned to Texas and started teaching in Midland, Texas schools for the fall term of 1929. His debut as an educator started just months before the stock market crash known as Black Tuesday, October 29, 1929. While his job was secure, business failures and unemployment were severe in Midland, and this had a profound effect on Cotner as a historian.

Cotner embarked on a career in higher education in 1932. That year he secured a job as a dean at Henderson State College in Arkadelphia, Arkansas. Meanwhile, he also pursued his doctorate at Harvard University in 1933 and 1934 with the support of an Austin Scholarship. Around 1837, he accepted a position as professor of history and government at Stetson University, where he also served as dean of men. He returned to Harvard through a Rosenwald Fellowship in 1939 and 1940. Among the historians at Harvard were Arthur Schlesinger, Sr. and Samuel E. Morison. Cotner completed the coursework for his doctorate in 1940. His dissertation advisor was Frederick Merk. However, he accepted a faculty post at the University of Texas prior to completing his comprehensive exams and his dissertation. The history department hired more instructors to meet its growing enrollment; however, with the Pearl Harbor attack on December 7, 1941, enrollment collapsed, and Cotner was just one of two history professors retained.

Cotner joined the US military in Europe in 1942. He began with the Service Force of the Atlantic as a personnel specialist. By the end of the year, he transferred to the Bureau of Naval Personnel and was eventually promoted to a rank Commander, assigned to the Chief of Naval Operations, where he helped to coordinate to return of US troops back home. He completed his military tour in 1946.

Cotner returned to the University of Texas in 1946. With returning servicemen who made use of the GI Bill, enrollment swelled and Cotner resumed a full teaching schedule. He also secured a book contract with Houghton Mifflin Company for Readings in American History. He balanced teaching with compiling his anthology until its publication in 1952. Meanwhile, he had not yet completed his dissertation for Harvard University to fulfill his PhD. This was a problem for Cotner because the University of Texas began a new requirement that all its teachers hold doctorate degrees.

The University of Texas recognized Cotner as a good teacher who was generous in his time in helping students. He also borrowed from his education at Harvard in order to change the teaching of history at the University of Texas. He taught social history, handed down to him by Arthur Schlesinger, Sr, popular biography courses, and introduced urban history to the university. He was also an advocate of interdisciplinary studies.

Cotner was also a university administrator and participated in various professional organizations. He chaired the university's Pre-Law Advising Committee. He was also attached to the Dean's office as a graduate advisor. Cotner was president of the East Texas Historical Association and the West Texas Historical Association. He was a member of the Texas State Historical Association, the Southern Science Association, and the Southwestern Social Science Association. He edited the Southwestern Historical Quarterly and the West Texas Historical Yearbook.

By the late 1950s, Cotner had still not completed his doctorate at Harvard. He had neither passed his exams, nor had he finished his dissertation, a project he began in 1939. In 1959, he passed his comprehensive exams and published, James Stephen Hogg: A Biography. He received the support of the Hogg family in completing his research, especially from the former Governor's daughter, Ima Hogg. Texas Governor Price Daniel promoted the book with a reception at his mansion. The book faced mixed reviews. Herbert Gambrell and Ralph Wooster offered favorable reviews, while other reviewers, including Frederick Merk, claimed that Cotner was too deferential to his subject.

== Personal life ==
Cotner married Elizabeth Marie Beihan on January 30, 1943. The Cotners lived in Arlington, Virginia while he was stationed in Washington, D.C. In 1946, they returned to Austin, where Catherine Elizabeth Cotner was born in 1947 and Robert Crawford Cotner, Jr. was born in 1949.

== Death ==
Cotner died on September 23, 1980, in Austin.

== Bibliography ==
- Scheer, Mary L. (2013). "Robert Cotner". In Cox, Patrick L.; Hendrickson, Jr., Kenneth E. (eds.). Writing the Story of Texas. Austin: University of Texas Press. pp. 170–183. ISBN 978-0-292-74537-7.
