= Lucy Wilson (physicist) =

American physicist (1888-1980)

- Born: October 19, 1888; Bloomington, Illinois, U.S.
- Died: September 22, 1980 (aged 91); Wellesley, Massachusetts, U.S.
- Education: Wellesley College, B.A. 1909; Johns Hopkins University, Ph.D. 1917
- Scientific career
- Fields: Vision; Optics; Spectroscopy
- Workplaces: Mount Holyoke College; Wellesley College
- Thesis: The structure of the 2536 Mercury line
- Doctoral advisors: Joseph Sweetman Ames

Lucy Wilson (October 19, 1888 – September 22, 1980) was an American physicist, known for her research on theories of vision, optics and X-ray spectroscopy. She was also the first dean of students at Wellesley College.

== Biography ==
She was born October 19, 1888, in Bloomington, Illinois, the daughter of Lucy Barron White and John James Speed Wilson Jr. Her father worked for American Telephone and Telegraph in Chicago as did his father and her younger brother. Her younger brother had begun to attend the Massachusetts Institute of Technology two years after Lucy Wilson had entered Wellesley. Wilson not only studied the sciences but also had an interest in languages, especially German, which she studied in high school. Older members of her family had also attended higher education. For instance her grandfather had attended Harvard College and the Harvard Medical School and her mother attended Houghton Seminary in Clinton. Wilson's aunt was one of the early women graduates of Oberlin College and taught history. When Wilson was about 2, her father died and her mother took the young Lucy and her baby brother to live with their grandparents in Bloomington. Wilson and her family were Episcopalian. Wilson began attending Wellesley College in 1905, and attributed her choice of schooling to her high school mathematics teacher, Miss Ethel Cobb, also a Wellesley graduate (class of 1899).

At Wellesley, Wilson took classes in multiple subjects including psychology from Eleanor Gamble and physics from Sarah Frances Whiting. She earned her bachelor's degree from Wellesley College in 1909, following which she became an assistant and then an instructor in physics at Mount Holyoke College until 1911. She left this position to complete a PhD at Johns Hopkins University, and received a position at Wellesley College in 1917. In 1924, Wilson studied at Manchester University under William Henry Bragg, during which she remarked that there was often more opportunity for female physicists in the US as opposed to the UK.

She became a professor in physics and psychology in 1935. This dual appointment was a result of work in both perception and optics. The first year she worked more in psychology than in physics. She taught introductory physics course, optics, meteorology, and in conjunction with Helen Jones, a combined physics/chemistry course. A popular course that she taught was automobile mechanics. From 1938 she also held administrative positions, beginning with acting dean of the college in 1938 and then as the college's first dean of students in 1939. During the Second World War she shared duties as acting president of the college while the seventh president, Mildred McAfee Horton, was on leave to serve as director of the WAVES. In 1945 she was named the first Sarah Frances Whiting Professor, a position created in honor of the Wellesley College physicist and astronomer Sarah Frances Whiting. Wilson retired in 1954, following which the senior class established a scholarship fund in her name.

Wilson died on September 22, 1980, in Wellesley, Massachusetts.

== Positions ==
- 1909-14 Assistant and Instructor, Mount Holyoke College
- 1917-20 Instructor of psychology, Wellesley College
- 1918-20 Instructor of physics, Wellesley College
- 1920-24 Assistant Professor, Wellesley College
- 1924-35 Associate Professor, Wellesley College
- 1935-54 Professor in physics and psychology, Wellesley College
- 1938-39 Acting Dean of College, Wellesley College
- 1939-54 Dean of College

== Publications ==
- Lucy Wilson, "The Structure of the Mercury Line, λ 2536," Astrophysical Journal, Volume 46, Issue 5 (December 1917): 340-354.
- Lucy Wilson, "Grace Evangeline Davis, Professor of Physics," The Wellesley Magazine, Volume 20, Issue 6 (August 1936): 435-436.
- Morrison, Edwin, L. W. Taylor, Frances G. Wick, Lucy Wilson, and Calvin N. Warfield, "Physics in a Liberal Arts Education," American Journal of Physics, Volume 3 (1935): 91-91.
- Lucy Wilson, "Our New Life" in Wellesley After-Images: Reflections on their College Years by Forty-Five Alumnae, edited and published by the Wellesley College Club of Los Angeles (United States: Anderson, Ritchie, and Simon, 1974), 3-5.

== See also ==
- Women in science
- List of female scientists before the 21st century
