= Gladys Nelson Smith =

American painter

- self portrait
- Born: August 15, 1890
- Died: September 15, 1980 (aged 90); Kensington, Maryland
- Known for: Painting
- Spouse: Errett Smith

Gladys Nelson Smith (August 15, 1890 – September 15, 1980) was an American painter.

Born in either El Dorado or Chelsea, Kansas, Smith was one of ten children. She first studied art at the University of Kansas, from which she graduated in 1918. Her husband, Errett Smith, having been drafted, she relocated to New York City to await his return. There she took lessons at the Art Students League of New York. Further study came at the Art Institute of Chicago and at the Corcoran School of Art, where her teachers included Edmund C. Tarbell and Richard Sumner Meryman, Sr. She remained in the Washington, D.C. area for the rest of her life, taking classes at the Corcoran until 1930. During her career Smith exhibited with the Society of Washington Artists and showed work at the Corcoran Biennials. At the Society's exhibitions of 1936 and 1939 she received popular prizes; in 1929 she received a bronze medal. She showed a number of works at the Greater Washington Independent Exhibition of 1935, and in 1939 was part of an exhibit with the Landscape Club of Washington. Solo exhibits of her paintings were held in 1979 and 1984–1985, the latter at the Corcoran Gallery of Art. In 1936 Smith and her husband purchased a farm near Frederick, Maryland as a weekend retreat, and this was to provide her the source from which she found much subject matter. They lived in Chevy Chase beginning in 1949. Her husband died in 1974. Smith moved into a nursing home in Kensington, Maryland at the end of her life, and died there after a battle with Parkinson's disease. She was survived by two sisters.

Stylistically, Smith's work has been described as Impressionistic. An oil on canvas titled Studio Portrait of a Model (Reggio) from the second half of the 1920s is currently in the collection of the Smithsonian American Art Museum. An undated oil, Carnival Fantasy, is owned by the Hirshhorn Museum and Sculpture Garden. The Tippler, an oil of 1930–1940, is owned by the Los Angeles County Museum of Art; it is one of a number of paintings of elderly figures dating to that decade. The Morris Museum of Art owns Afternoon by the Beach, Chesapeake Bay, an oil on canvas from the 1930s, and the undated oil Washing Clothes in the East Yard. The Johnson Collection of Southern Art in Spartanburg, South Carolina owns six paintings, including a self-portrait. Smith is also represented in the collection of the Butler Institute of American Art, and was formerly represented in the collection of the Corcoran Gallery of Art.
