= Don Howard (footballer) =

Australian rules footballer, born 1913

Personal information
- Full name: Donald Stewart Howard
- Born: 4 February 1913; South Melbourne, Victoria
- Died: 2 September 1980 (aged 67); Queensland
- Original team: Northcote
- Height: 171 cm (5 ft 7 in)
- Weight: 70 kg (154 lb)

Playing career^{1}
| Years | Club | Games (Goals) |
| 1937 | Essendon | 1 (0) |
| 1938 | South Melbourne | 6 (1) |
| Total | | 7 (1) |
- ^{1} Playing statistics correct to the end of 1938.

Donald Stewart Howard (4 February 1913 – 2 September 1980) was an Australian rules footballer who played with Essendon and South Melbourne in the Victorian Football League (VFL).
