= Leonard Frank (photographer) =

German-Canadian photographer

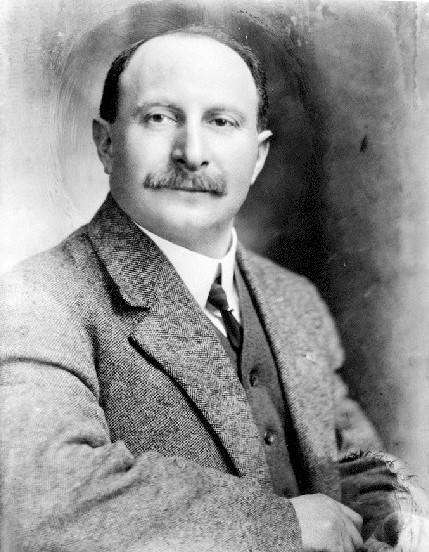
- Born: Leonhard Juda Frank; July 3, 1870; Berne, Germany
- Died: February 23, 1944 (aged 73); Vancouver, British Columbia, Canada
- Known for: Photographer

Leonard Frank (July 3, 1870 – February 23, 1944) was a German–Canadian photographer known for commercial and industrial photography. First emigrating to San Francisco, two years later he made his way up the coast to eventually settle in the town of Alberni on Vancouver Island. The chance win of a camera in a raffle steered him towards a career in photography. He became especially noted for his logging and landscape views. In 1916, Frank relocated to Vancouver, where he established a successful commercial studio. Frank left behind a massive body of work, much of it found at the Alberni Valley Museum, the Jewish Historical Society of British Columbia, and the Vancouver Public Library.

== Early life ==
He was born Leonhard Juda Frank on July 3, 1870, to a German Jewish family, at Berne, Wesermarsch, a small town in northwestern Germany. His family were religious Jews. Leonhard's father, Louis Frank, operated a photographic studio in Berne.

In 1892, Frank emigrated to San Francisco, where he remained for two years. Hearing of good mining prospects up north, he relocated to Victoria. He first found employment with Simon Leiser & Co., a merchandising firm. By 1896, he was sent as a clerk to the company's general store in Wellington, not far from Nanaimo. After two years, he moved to Alberni, at the mouth of the Somass River.

== Alberni ==
Frank owned a general store in Alberni. In 1898, Leonard was joined by his brother Bernard. Whenever possible, the two brothers prospected for copper deposits on the west side of the Alberni canal, yet it wasn't until 1916 that a producing mine was established in the area.

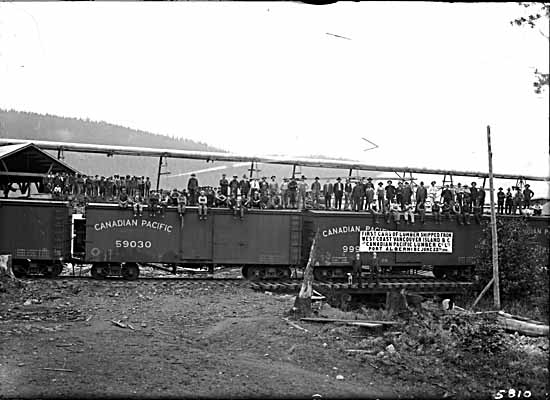
First Canadian Pacific Railway cars with lumber shipped from Port Alberni. 22 June 1912.

Legend has it that sometime before 1900, Frank won a primitive box camera in a raffle at an Alberni mining camp. Having found buyers for some of his images, he decided on photography as a career. His pictures supplemented his income from guiding hunting, exploration, and tourist parties. Only five feet tall, he was described as "tough as a piece of wire rope when it came to trekking in logging country. He climbed Mount Arrowsmith as well as many other Vancouver Island peaks. Around 1906, Frank took a renowned picture of ptarmigans, at 5,500 feet elevation, which was exhibited in 1910 at the Sportsmen's Show in Vienna. Beginning about 1907, Frank operated a photographic studio next to the Alberni Pioneer News building, where he sometimes found work as a reporter.

During the years 1907 to 1909, Frank photographed the extent of Vancouver Island. In the summer of 1909 he operated a gasoline launch on Great Central Lake, for the transport of touring parties. His reputation was now spreading to international locales. Besides Vienna, he had exhibits in London and Glasgow, and his logging photographs were singled out for praise. He started to win contracts from timber and mining companies, beginning his career as an industrial photographer. In 1910, Frank published a book of Alberni views. He was usually present to record any local historical event, such as the arrival of the first passenger train of the E&N Railway to arrive in Port Alberni in 1911. The following year he was assigned as the official photographer of the newly created Strathcona Provincial Park.

The purchase of an automobile in 1913 gave Frank greater mobility. An economic downturn in the Alberni district started in November 1913, and coupled with anti-German sentiment at the outbreak of the First World War, Frank decided to leave Alberni. His last advertisement appeared in May 1916.

In January 1917, Frank was arrested on the charge by a local family of indecent assault against a child of "tender years". He was taken to Nanaimo and later released on bail. His three-hour trial, on February 15, 1917, resulted in an acquittal. (Note: The court records of Nanaimo and Alberni have not been catalogued at the British Columbia Archives, so the proceedings of the trial remain unknown.)

== Vancouver ==
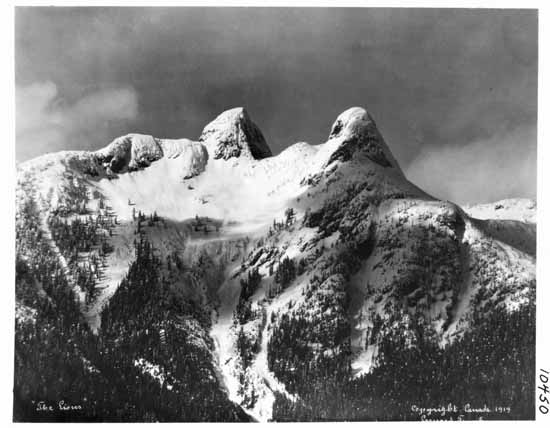
The Lions. 1919.

Frank had visited Vancouver many times previously, photographing Stanley Park, and notably, in 1914, the passengers of the Komagata Maru. He partnered in 1918 with another photographer, Orville J. Rognon, to form the Commercial Photo Company. The pair sought out commercial work, and freelanced for the Vancouver Daily Province, the Vancouver Sun, and other publications. Frank obtained assignments from the City of Vancouver publicity department, and became a promoter of the city. Orville Rognon left the firm in 1919. Frank relocated to Granville Street, where the firm remained until 1953. His brother Bernard took over the bookkeeping role, and a darkroom operator, Albert W. Urquart, was hired. The company was capable of producing enlargements up to 4 by 5 feet.

In the fall of 1918, Frank travelled to Haida Gwaii to photograph stands of Sitka Spruce used in airplane manufacture. In 1919, he captured The Lions, a pair of peaks north of Vancouver. Perhaps his most celebrated image, the photograph was immediately successful, and appeared in the local papers as well as Leslie's Weekly.

Among his diverse range of subjects, he took early pictures of motorized logging. Frank also photographed British royalty throughout his career. In 1920, he began to take publicity photographs for the Canadian Pacific Railway, becoming in the next year the official photographer of their western lines. A major commission from the same company, in the years 1924 to 1926, was to record the construction of piers "B" and "C" in the Vancouver harbour. In 1924, he produced a booklet of postcards recording British Columbia timber scenes.

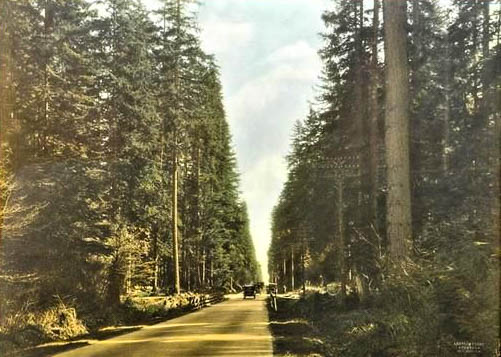
Hand-tinted photograph of Green Timbers Urban Forest Park, along Pacific Highway (now Fraser Highway) in Surrey. 1923 to 1927.

Frank experimented with infrared photography, his best known image a view of Mount Baker. In 1921, he photographed the dedication of the Peace Arch. A favourite subject was the line of Canadian Pacific ships, especially as they entered Vancouver harbour. One photograph, of the steamship Aorangi, was enlarged 82 times, to the giant size of 40 inches by 6 feet. Today, Frank's documentation of shipping is of great value to historians. Noteworthy as well are his panoramic views, providing a record of the evolving skyline of Vancouver.

He photographed President Warren G. Harding on a half-day visit to Vancouver in 1923. Other celebrity images included those of Roald Amundsen, Bliss Carman, William Lyon Mackenzie King, Anna Pavlova, and Sergei Rachmaninoff. For portraits, his preference was to photograph the subject at leisure or in their workplace.

An important aspect of his photography was documenting major architectural, engineering, and construction projects. Examples include the Ballantyne Pier (1921–1923), the building of the Second Narrows Bridge (1926), the new Hotel Vancouver (1928–1939), the completion of the Burrard Bridge (1932), Vancouver City Hall (1935–1936), and the Lions Gate Bridge (1938–1939).

Frank's pictures illustrated many special feature sections and supplements of local newspapers. By the 1920s he was increasingly recognized from farther afield, and he had commissions from National Geographic, The Saturday Evening Post, The New York Times, The Christian Science Monitor, and Canadian Geographical Journal.

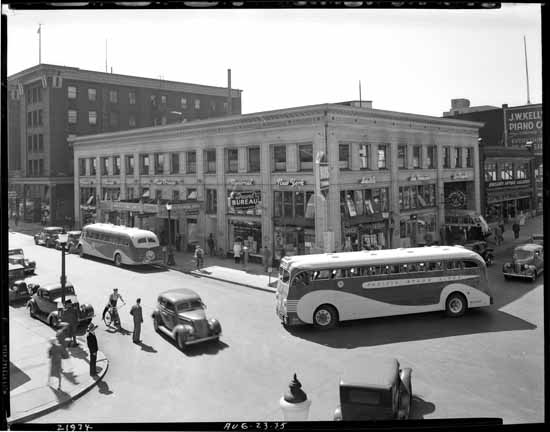
Pacific Stage Lines bus depot in Vancouver. 23 August 1938.

For many years Frank was the official photographer of the Vancouver Board of Trade. This gave him the opportunity to travel four times on their annual excursions to northern coastal waters. In 1928, he changed his company name to Leonard Frank Photos, advertised as "Commercial Photographers, Timber, Mines, Industries and Enlarging Specialists". For Vancouver's 50th anniversary in 1936, his photographs illustrated a pictorial book.

He became a member in September 1937 of the Royal Photographic Society of Great Britain, and after submitting a portfolio the following year, was admitted to an "associateship" in the society. In 1938, one of his images appeared on a Canadian 50-cent stamp. Taken in 1934, it depicted a view of Burrard Inlet. Frank was further honoured in 1939 to execute all the enlargements and transparencies for the British Columbia exhibit at the San Francisco World's Fair. In 1942, his logging scenes illustrated Robert Swanson's poetry chapbook, Rhymes of a Western Logger.

The Frank brothers kept in contact with their family overseas. During World War II, with the exception of a sister, Mrs. Hertz, and a niece, their relatives perished in the Holocaust.

Frank died in his sleep on February 23, 1944. Only a few days earlier, he was in the Vancouver Sun office, remarking that his 25,000 negatives would provide the city archivist with some photographs of historic importance.

== Legacy ==
With the help of Albert Urquart, and while seeking a new owner, Bernard Frank carried on as interim manager until he died suddenly on February 20, 1946. The Frank brothers are buried in the Schara Tzedeck cemetery in New Westminster. The new owner of Leonard Frank photos became Otto Landauer, a Jewish refugee who continued the commercial aspect of the firm.

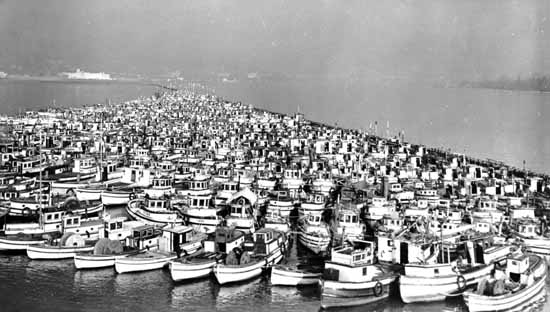
Round up of Japanese fishing boats. 1942.

The Vancouver Public Library obtained a significant collection of Frank's glass plates in 1965. Four years later, they featured a display of 325 prints, largely made up from Frank's images.

His photographs are also found at the British Columbia Archives, the Royal British Columbia Museum, the BC and Yukon Chamber of Mines, the University of British Columbia Special Collections, and the Alberni Valley Museum.

Some of Frank's images were shown at the Vancouver Art Gallery in 1976, as part of the exhibit "Eleven Early British Columbia Photographers, 1890–1940".

Five years after Landauer's death in 1980, the Jewish Historical Society of British Columbia purchased a substantial body of work for both Landauer and Frank. A retrospective was held in 1986, at the Shalom Gallery of the Vancouver Jewish Community Centre.

In 1989, a collection of 75 of Frank's forest industry photographs was exhibited at the Vancouver Trade and Convention Centre during the annual truck logger's convention. These pictures are now permanently displayed at the British Columbia Forest Museum in Duncan.

In 1999, Frank was the subject of a television program produced by White Pine Pictures.

In 2012, thirty one of Frank's logging photographs were exhibited at Simon Fraser University, curated by Bill Jeffries. The title of the exhibit, Leonard Frank: Beautiful British Columbia, was as ironical juxtaposition of the phrase depicted on provincial license plates and the environmental destruction caused by logging.

A travelling exhibition, starting in 2016, entitled "Two Views: Photographs by Ansel Adams and Leonard Frank", made its final stop in 2020 at the Whatcom Museum. The photographs on display by Adams and Frank had differing approaches to depicting the Japanese internment during World War II. Adams' images were sympathetic in tone, while those of Frank were more severe.

== Reputation ==
An effusive account from a 1916 Vancouver newspaper depicted Frank as possessing "the eye of an artist and the heart of a poet", and being a "John Muir of the lens". He lived at a time in Alberni when he could photograph the last stage leaving, and the first train arriving. His images were used to illustrate school textbooks. Frank's photographs are known "for their natural light and unique camera angles." According to Otto Landauer, he was "the most important man in his field of photography in his day." The collection at the Vancouver Public Library has been described as the second most important in Canada, and the logging photographs as the best in the world.

== Gallery ==
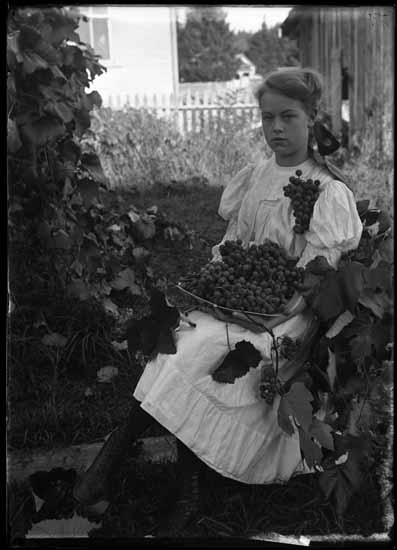
Portrait of girl with grapes. 1912.

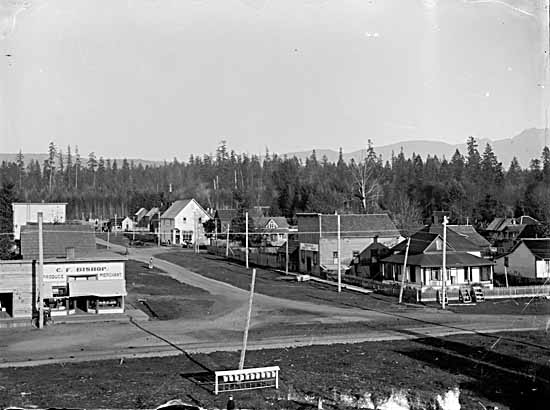
View of Port Alberni. Circa 1913.

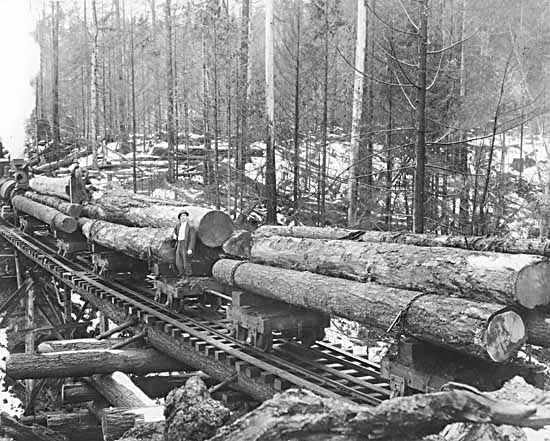
B.C. Mills, Timber and Trading Co. Circa 1913.

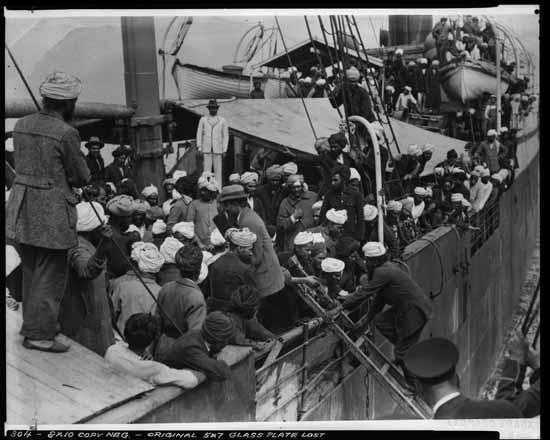
Crowded deck of Komagata Maru. 1914.

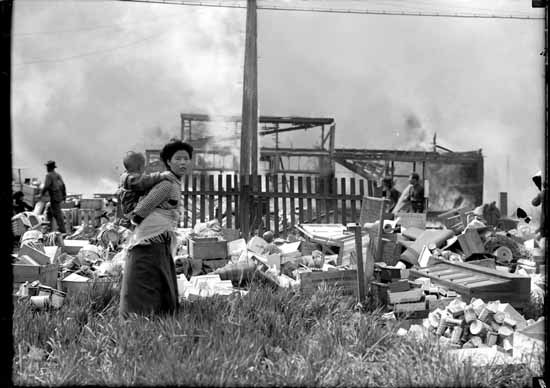
Steveston town fire. 1918.

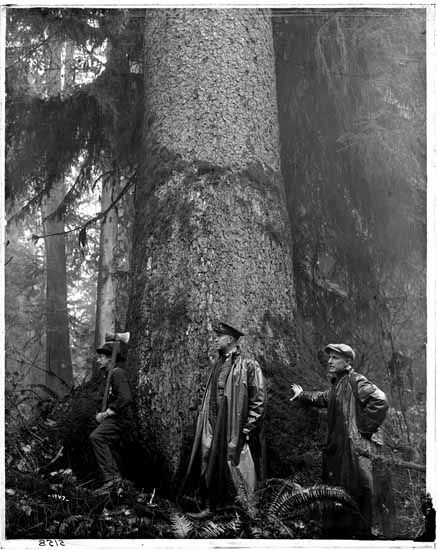
Men beside large spruce trees on Haida Gwaii. 1918-19.

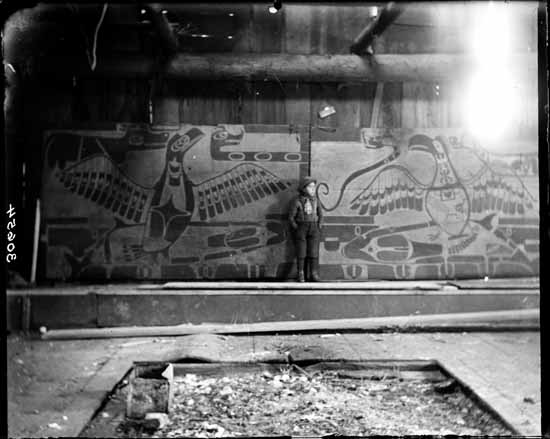
Nuu-chah-nulth boy standing in front of a painted screen. 1920.

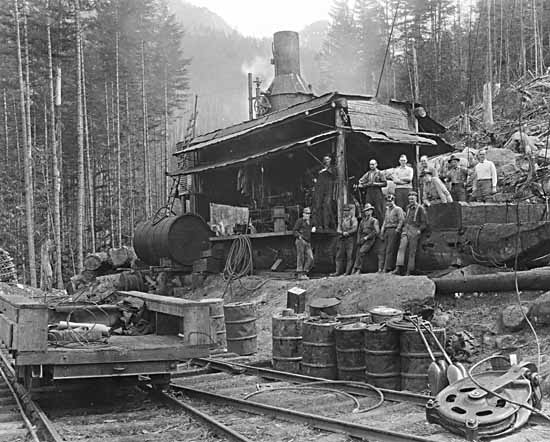
Men standing beside a donkey engine at the Brown & Kirkland Logging Co. Ltd. 1928.

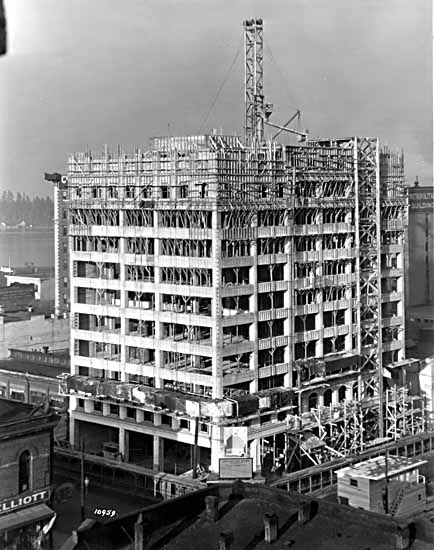
Vancouver Stock Exchange Building under construction. 6 Jan 1929.

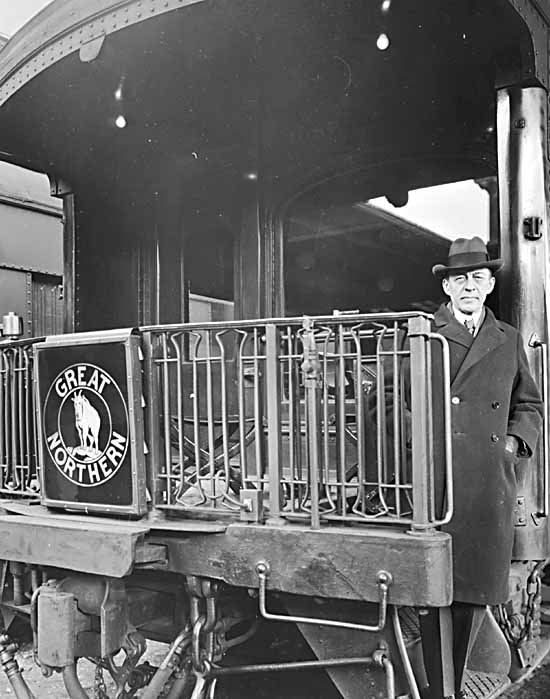
Sergei Rachmaninoff onboard Great Northern Railway car. 1929.

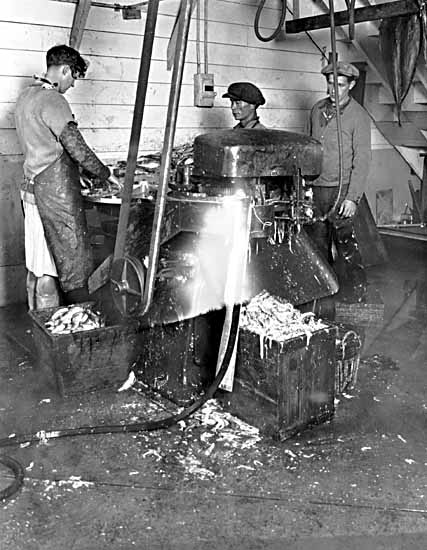
Deboning and cleaning herring at the London Fish Co. 28 Oct 1931.

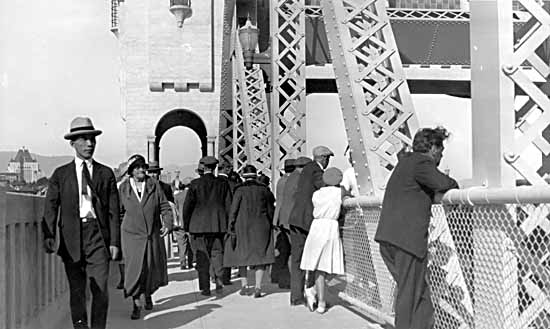
Opening of the Burrard Street Bridge. July 1932.

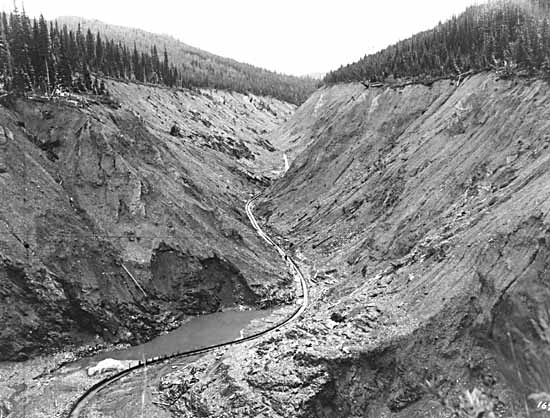
Miners sluicing the Lowhee Placer Claim. 1933.

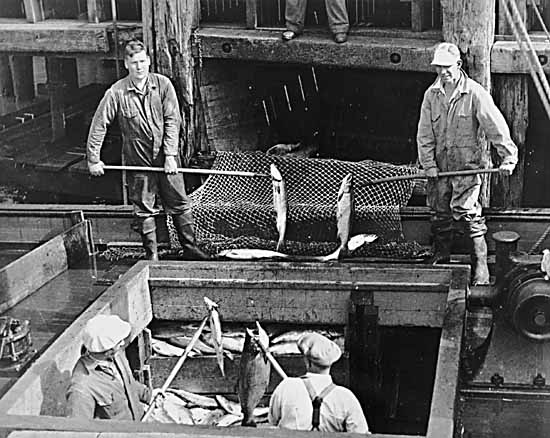
Men unloading salmon. 1937.

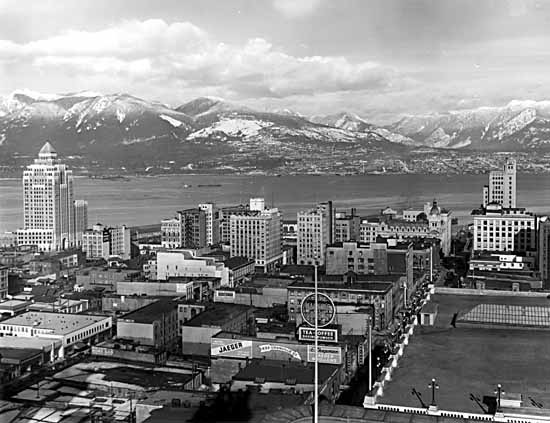
Rooftop view of Vancouver. 1937.

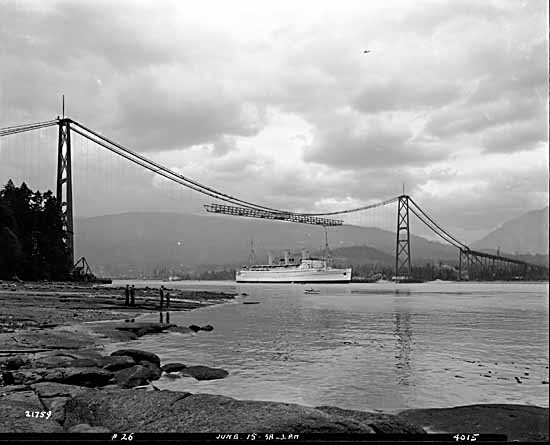
Lions Gate Bridge under construction with Empress of Japan II passing underneath. 1938.

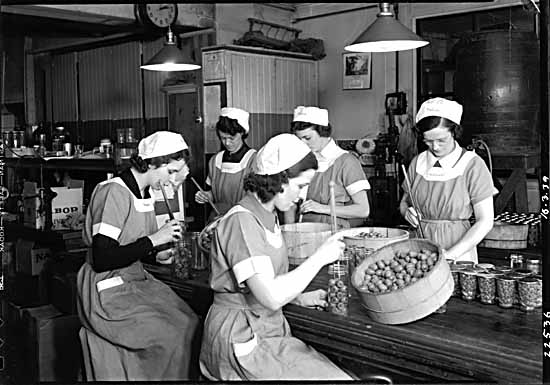
Packaging olives. 1939.

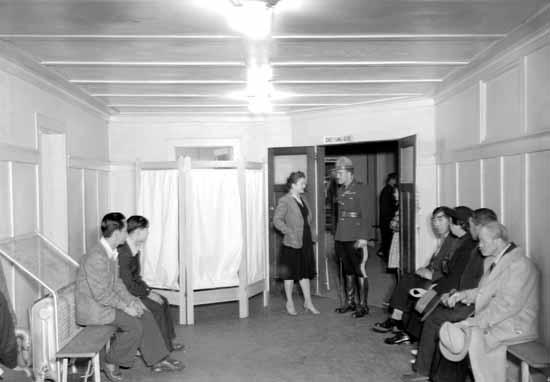
Japanese evacuation - Hastings Park, medical building interior. 11 May 1942.
