= Gudrun Slettengren-Fernholm =

Swedish ceramicist and sculptor

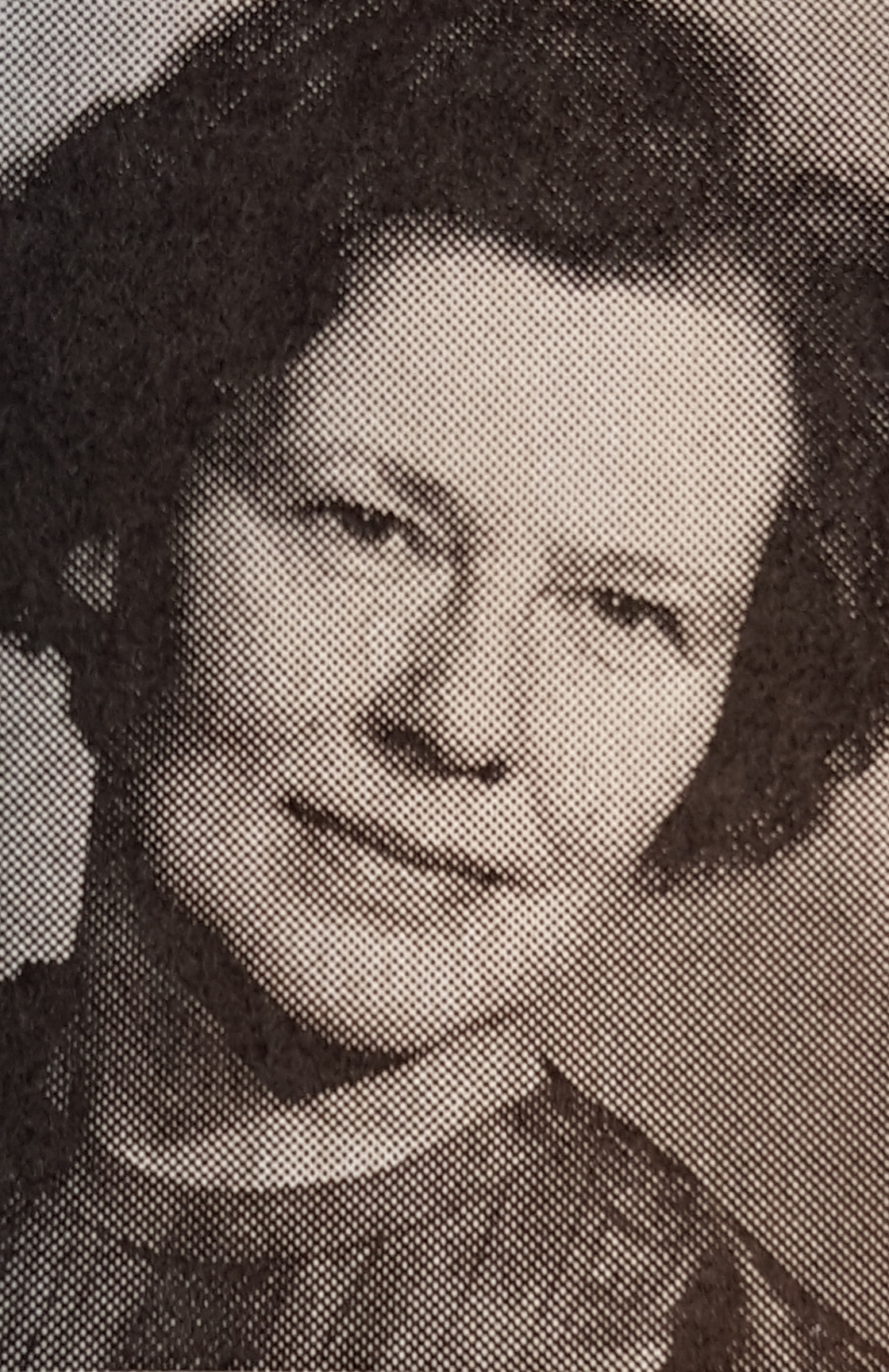
Gudrun Slettengren-Fernholm

Gudrun Constance Slettengren-Fernholm (21 May 1909 – 15 September 1980) was a Swedish ceramicist and sculptor.

== Early life and career ==
Gudrun was born in Gothenburg, Sweden. Her parents were Knut Leonard Slettengren, a civil engineer and Elsa Maria Fredrika Busck. She studied at School of Design and Crafts in Gothenburg from 1928–1932 and at Académie Scandinave in Paris from 1932–1933. She worked at Steninge Lervarufabrik in Märsta for one year, in 1934-1935 before continuing her studies at the Norwegian National Academy of Fine Arts in Oslo. She married Tor Fernholm in 1942. During her studies she conducted several study trips to Germany, Denmark, France and Norway. Her works have been exhibited at the Röhsska Museum in Gothenburg and at the Nordiska Kompaniet in Stockholm. She participated several times in the art exhibitions at the Röhsska Art Exhibition. Her art consists of ceramic items and portraits, as well as smaller animal and figure sculptures.
