= Wilfrid McVittie =

British diplomat (1906–1980)

Wilfrid Wolters McVittie CMG (24 May 1906 – 17 September 1980) was Ambassador Extraordinary And Plenipotentiary of Great Britain to the Dominican Republic from 1958 to 1962. A career consul, he also served in Argentina, Portugal, and the United States.

== Personal life ==
McVittie was born in İzmir, Ottoman Empire to an English father who had arrived for the tobacco trade. Wilfrid married the former Morna Harriett Mary Mornington. Together they became the parents of two daughters and a son.
