= Benjy F. Brooks =

American pediatric surgeon (1918–1998)

- Born: August 10, 1918; Lewisville, Texas
- Died: April 2, 1998 (aged 79)
- Education: University of Texas Medical Branch
- Known for: Being one of the earliest female pediatric surgeons
- Medical career
- Field: Pediatric surgery
- Institutions: Texas Children's Hospital; St. Joseph Medical Center; Hermann Hospital
- Awards: Horatio Alger Award (1983)

Benjy Frances Brooks (August 10, 1918 – April 2, 1998) was an American pediatric surgeon affiliated with several hospitals in Houston. She was the first woman in the surgery department at Harvard Medical School and the first woman to become a pediatric surgeon in the state of Texas. She founded the pediatric surgery division at the University of Texas Health Science Center at Houston. Brooks actively conducted research throughout her career in addition to working as a pediatric surgeon.

Brooks received the Horatio Alger Award in 1983. She was inducted into the Texas Women's Hall of Fame in 1985. The Benjy Brooks Foundation for Children was erected in her honor by the parents of one of her patients to continue her legacy. Legislation named after Brooks was passed in Texas in 2018.

== Early life ==
Brooks was born in Lewisville, Texas. She learned to read before she started school, and as a child, she was known to "perform surgery" on her sister's dolls. Brooks remembered that her fifth-grade teacher told her mother that Brooks was mentally retarded. "I didn't really fit into the sausage mill, to come out a little sausage like everyone else. Unfortunately, that's what our educational system does to children. At times, it takes away their creativeness and the fact that they are different," Brooks explained.

== Career ==
Nineteen years old when she earned a bachelor's degree at North Texas State Teacher's College, Brooks stayed at the school for another two years to complete a master's degree. She was a high school teacher for four years before she enrolled in medical school at the University of Texas Medical Branch in Galveston, Texas. She pursued pediatric surgery, completing postgraduate training at the University of Pennsylvania, Harvard Medical School and the Royal Hospital for Sick Children, Glasgow. While at Harvard Medical School in 1953, Brooks, along with two other physicians, discovered a treatment for jaundice using gamma globulin.

Returning to Boston, Brooks practiced there from 1957 to 1960. She was the first woman hired by the Harvard Medical School surgery department. She decided to return to Texas, where she was the third pediatric surgeon and the first woman in the specialty. She operated at Texas Children's Hospital and St. Joseph Hospital and was a faculty member at Baylor College of Medicine. In 1965, Brooks participated in the separation surgery for nine-week-old conjoined twins at Texas Children's Hospital. Although this was the tenth surgery of its type to take place in the United States, it was the first to take place in Houston and Brooks was the only member of the surgical team for this operation who was a woman.

In 1973, Brooks became the founding chief of pediatric surgery at the University of Texas Health Science Center in Houston and she held that post for a decade. In the mid-1970s, when Brooks was also the chief of pediatric surgery at Hermann Hospital, there were more than 200 pediatric surgeons in North America, but a small number were female. Brooks once stated that she felt that being a Texan aided in her successful career in the medical field due to the state's history of pioneering women., Dr. Brooks also completed research on congenital defects and burn treatment.

Brooks held a faculty appointment in leadership and ethics at the University of Texas at Tyler, she established the Bart Brooks Endowed Professorship there in honor of her brother, a lieutenant in the U.S. Air Force who was killed in the Korean War.

== Honors and awards ==
Brooks received outstanding alumni awards from both North Texas State University and the University of Texas Medical Branch. She received the Artist of Life award, given by the International Women's Writing Guild to honor high-achieving women. She received the Horatio Alger Award in 1983. She received this award for her research on birth defects as well as burn treatment. In addition to her research on birth defects and burn treatment, she was also interested in research on spleen repair and hepatitis prevention. In 1985, she was inducted into the Texas Women's Hall of Fame. In 1994, Dr. Brooks was named as one of "Houston's Pioneer Women and Today's Leaders."

== Later life and legacy ==
After retiring from active practice, Brooks continued to volunteer as a surgeon on mission trips in Romania through at least 1996. She died in 1998. Following her death, the Houston Chronicle referred to Dr. Brooks as a "strong child advocate" because, in addition to the surgeries she performed on children, she also once appeared in court to testify in a case of child abuse.

Since 1991, the UT Medical School has given the Benjy Brooks Award to physicians who set good examples for students at the school. The Benjy Brooks Foundation for Children supports pediatric surgical care in Texas. The Benjy Brooks Foundation for Children was originally erected thanks to the parents of a patient she treated. The parents of this patient established this foundation in honor of Brooks to "continue her legacy of exceptional surgical care to children." The Benjy Brooks Foundation for Children has led to improvements in the state of Texas with regards to the surgical care children receive. The foundation provides equipment to hospitals and offers grants to aid in the research of diseases affecting children.

In 2018, the Dr. Benjy Frances Brooks Children's Hospital GME Support Reauthorization Act of 2018 was passed in the state of Texas. This bill provides hospitals that train physicians in pediatrics with financial support with the goal of ensuring children have access to physicians specialized in pediatrics.
