= S. Eva Singletary =

American surgeon who specialized in the care of breast cancer

Sonja Eva Singletary (December 23, 1952 – July 29, 2015) was an American surgeon who specialized in the care of breast cancer. She was a faculty member at the University of Texas MD Anderson Cancer Center and a past president of the Society of Surgical Oncology.

== Biography ==
Singletary was born near Florence, South Carolina, to Joe and Agnes Singletary. Her father had met her mother, a native of Estonia, in Germany during World War II. Singletary grew up on a farm and later attended Clemson University, graduating in two years with a perfect grade point average. She earned a medical degree from the Medical University of South Carolina. After training in general surgery at the University of Florida College of Medicine,

Singletary completed a fellowship in surgical oncology at the University of Texas MD Anderson Cancer Center. Singletary stayed at MD Anderson as a faculty member, later serving as chief of the melanoma surgery and breast surgery sections. Her interest in breast cancer was influenced by MD Anderson radiation oncologist Eleanor Montague.

In 1992, the President's Cancer Panel appointed her to a special committee that examined the state of breast cancer treatment and research. Singletary created patient education materials, including the DVD Moving Beyond Breast Cancer.

For more than ten years, Singletary was the editor-in-chief of Breast Diseases: A Yearbook Quarterly. She was a section editor of the Annals of Surgical Oncology. In 1996, she was inducted into the Texas Women's Hall of Fame. In 2002, Singletary received a Distinguished Alumnus Award from the Medical University of South Carolina. She was the 2004–05 president of the Society of Surgical Oncology, and she was the first woman to hold that post. She died in Houston in 2015 at the age of 62.
