= Mary Griffith =

Mary Griffith may refer to:

- Mary Pix (née Griffith; 1666–1709), English novelist and playwright
- Mary Griffith (writer) (1772–1846), American writer, horticulturist, and scientist
- Mary Harriett Griffith (1849–1930), Australian philanthropist
- Mary Agnes Christina Mesmer Griffith (1864–1948), called Tina, oldest daughter of Louis and Catherine Mesmer
- Mary Emma Griffith Marshall (née Griffith; 1888–1925), American editor and librarian
- Mary Lavinia Griffith (1906–1993), American rancher and conservationist
- Mary Griffith (activist) (1934–2020), American LGBT rights activist

== See also ==
- Mari Griffith (1940–2019), Welsh broadcaster, singer, and author
