= Texas Women's Hall of Fame =

State list of significant women

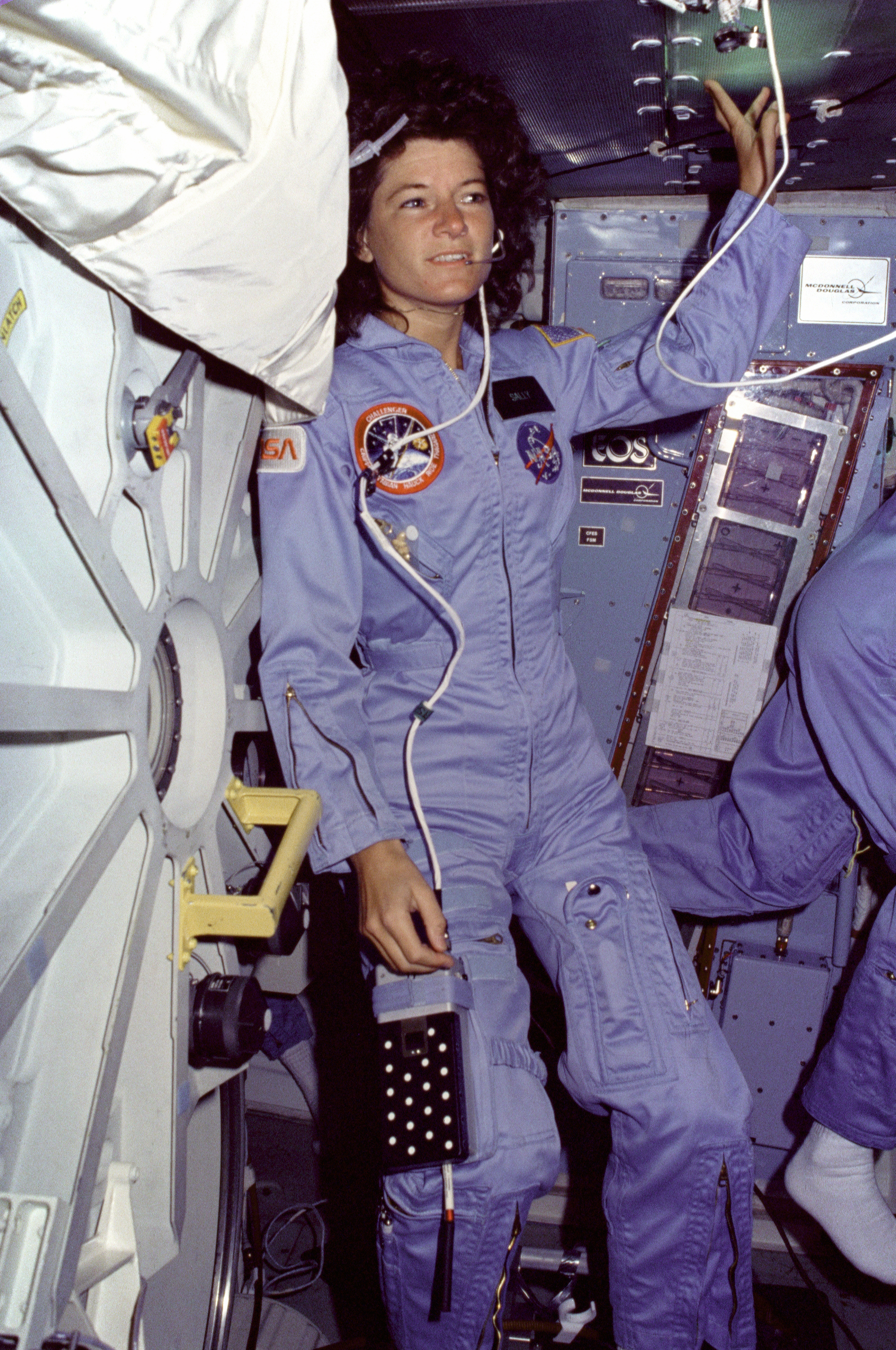
Astronaut Sally Ride

The Texas Women's Hall of Fame was established in 1984 by the Governor's Commission on Women. The honorees are selected biennially from submissions from the public. The honorees must be either native Texans or a resident of Texas at the time of the nomination.

== Exhibit location, hours ==
The Texas Women's Hall of Fame Museum is located inside Blagg-Huey Library on the Denton, Texas campus of Texas Woman's University. It houses a permanent exhibit featuring the accomplishments of each of the honorees.

== Inductees ==
Texas Women's Hall of Fame
Name	Image	Birth–Death	Year	Area of achievement	Ref(s)
Bonnie J. Dunbar		(b. 1949)	2025	Retired NASA astronaut, Director of the Aerospace Human Systems Laboratory	
Eva Guzman		(b. 1961)	2025	First Latina elected to statewide office in Texas; served on the Supreme Court of Texas and the 14th Court of Appeals	
Vicki Hollub		(b. 1959)	2025	President and CEO of Occidental Petroleum	
Adair Margo			2025	Arts advocate and philanthropist	
Christine A. Nix			2025	Army reservist; first African American woman promoted into the Texas Rangers Division of the Department of Public Safety	
Carrie Marcus Neiman		(b. 1883)	2025	Co-founder of Neiman Marcus	
Leta Andrews		(b. 1937)	2023	Athletics	
Val LaMantia			2023	Business entrepreneur who helped found the Syars Scholarship Fund	
Mary Horn		(1945–2023)	2023	Public service	
Opal Lee		(b. 1926)	2023	Activist who worked to make Juneteenth a federally-recognized holiday	
Lavinia Masters			2023	Advocacy/Community Service; 1st Surviving African American with a law her Namesake of Texas, HB8: The Lavinia Masters Act (2019)	
Antonietta Quigg		(b. 1968)	2023	Science/Technology	
Charlotte Sharp		(1953–2020)	2023	Philanthropy	
Elizabeth Suarez			2023	Public Service	
Lauren Anderson		(b. 1965)	2021	Ballet dancer and a first black principal dancer with the Houston Ballet	
Charlye O. Farris		(1929–2010)	2021	First African American female lawyer in Texas	
Dawn Ferrell			2021	Major General (ret.) - Texas Air National Guard	
Kendra Scott		(b. 1974)	2021	Business entrepreneur	
Elaine Stolte			2021	Community Service	
Ofelia Vasquez-Philo		(1932–2017)	2021	Civic Leadership	
Simone Biles		(b. 1997)	2018	Olympic gymnast	
Laura Bush		(b. 1946)	2018	First Lady of the United States	
Vikki Carr		(b. 1940)	2018	Entertainer	
Susan Dell			2018	Philanthropy	
Tammie Jo Shults		(b. 1961)	2018	Airline pilot	
Elizabeth Anne Sueltenfuss		(1921–2009)	2018	Catholic nun with a Ph.D. in microbiology. Past president of Our Lady of the Lake University in San Antonio.	
Judith Zaffirini		(b. 1946)	2018	Texas state senator	
Emma Carter Browning		(1910–2010)	2016	Aviator	
Susie Hitchcock-Hall		(b. 1944)	2016	Entrepreneur	
Ginger Kerrick		(b. 1970)	2016	NASA Administrator	
Renu Khator		(b. 1955)	2016	Chancellor of the University of Houston System	
Selena Quintanilla-Pérez		(1971–1995)	2016	Musician	
Nandita Berry		(b. 1968)	2014	Texas Secretary of State	
Joanne Herring		(b. 1929)	2014	Houston-area socialite, philanthropist, and businesswoman	
Kim Olson		(b. 1957)	2014	President and CEO of Grace Under Fire	
Anita Perry		(b. 1952)	2014	First Lady of Texas	
Ann Stuart			2014	President and Chancellor of Texas Women's University	
Senfronia Thompson		(b. 1939)	2014	Texas state representative	
Deborah Tucker			2014	Founder of the National Center on Domestic and Sexual Violence	
Carolyn Wright		(b. 1946)	2014	Chief Justice for the Fifth Court of Appeals of Texas	
Barbara Smith Conrad		(1937–2017)	2012	Mezzo-soprano	
Anne Corn		(b. 1950)	2012	Professor Emerita at Vanderbilt University, educator in the field of visual impairment	
Nina Godiwalla		(b. 1975)	2012	Author/journalist	
Harriet O'Neill		(b. 1957)	2012	Retired Associate Justice of the Supreme Court of Texas	
Mary Saunders		(b. 1947)	2012	Major General, United States Air Force, highest ranking African American woman in the USAF	
Nancy W. Dickey		(b. 1950)	2010	Educator	
Erma Johnson Hadley		(1942–2015)	2010	Educator	
Teresa Lozano Long		(1928–2021)	2010	Cultural leader founded Teresa Lozano Long Institute of Latin American Studies	
Judy Castle Scott		(1946–)	2010	American Foundation for the Blind	
Pamela Willeford		(1950–)	2010	United States Ambassador to Switzerland and Liechtenstein	
Elsa Murano		(1959–)	2008	President, Texas A&M University	
Sandra Day O'Connor		(1930–2023)	2008	First female justice on the United States Supreme Court	
Carolyn Peterson		(1938–)	2008	Architect who helped preserve San Antonio Missions	
Louise Hopkins Underwood		(1919–2017)	2008	Patron of the arts	
Huda Zoghbi		(1954–)	2008	Health research	
Amanda Dunbar		(1982–)	2006	Artist	
Kathleen Foster			2006	Children and parents care facilities	
Shirley Neeley		(1935–)	2006	Educator	
Ellen Vitetta		(1942–)	2006	Microbiologist, cancer research	
Susan Combs		(1945–)	2004	Former Texas Comptroller, former Texas Commissioner of Agriculture	
Trinidad Mendenhall		(1950–)	2004	Businesswoman	
Mary Meyers Rosenfield		(1910–2006)	2004	Intellectual disability education	
Sheryl Swoopes		(1971–)	2004	Pro basketball player	
Karen Hughes		(1956–)	2002	Global Vice Chair of Burson-Marsteller, political advisor to George W. Bush	
Mae Jemison		(1956–)	2002	Astronaut	
Angela Murdaugh		(1940–2024)	2002	Franciscan Sister of Mary	
Ann Williams		(1937–)	2002	Founded Dallas Black Dance Theatre	
Tillie Burgin		(1936–)	2000	Educator, missionary	
Carol Dinkins		(1945–)	2000	Environmentalist	
Anna Maria Farias		(1952–)	2000	Housing, politician appointee under Ronald Reagan and George W. Bush	
Juliet V. García		(1949–)	2000	President of Texas Southmost College	
Glenna Goodacre		(1939–2020)	2000	Sculptor who designed the Vietnam Women's Memorial in Washington, D.C.	
Wendy Harpham		(1954–)	2000	Physician	
Jinger L. Heath		(1952–)	2000	Business woman	
Dealey Herndon		(1947–)	2000	Historic preservationist	
Mamie L. McKnight		(1929–2018)	2000	Family, community development	
Jo Stewart Randel		(1915–2002)	2000	Philanthropist	
Judy Rankin		(1945–)	2000	Golf pro	
Norma Lea Beasley		(1931–2012)	1998	Attorney; founded Trinity Abstract & Title Co. in Waxahachie and Safeco Land Title of Dallas; civic leader, philanthropist	
Shirley Thompson Carter		(1935–2001)	1998	Founder Texas Girls' Choir	
Elizabeth Lyons Ghrist		(1930–2024)	1998	Volunteerism	
Kay Granger		(1943–)	1998	Member United States House of Representatives	
Dixie Melillo		(1946–)	1998	Physician, founder of The Rose foundation providing free breast cancer screenings, founder The Rose Scholarship Program	
Diana Natalicio		(1939–2021)	1998	President, University of Texas at El Paso	
Marsha Sharp		(1952–)	1998	Women's basketball coach, Texas Tech University	
Ebby Halliday Acers		(1911–2015)	1996	Realtor; Texas Business Hall of Fame, the Dallas Chamber of Commerce Outstanding Woman in Business Award and the Dallas Brotherhood/Sisterhood Merit Citation Award	
Rita Crocker Clements		(1931–2018)	1996	First Lady of Texas, politician	
Zina Garrison-Jackson		(1963–)	1996	Tennis pro	
Sybil Harrington		(1908–1998)	1996	Patron of the arts	
Kay Bailey Hutchison		(1943–)	1996	United States Senator	
Helen Oujesky		(1930–2010)	1996	Professor of microbiology	
Ruby Lee Piester		(1915–2003)	1996	Child welfare	
Sonja Eva Singletary		(1952–2015)	1996	Breast surgeon	
Dian Graves Stai		(1940–)	1996	Businesswoman	
Rosa Ramírez Guerrero		(1934–)	1994	Founder, International Folklorico Dance Group	
Vassar Miller		(1924–1998)	1994	Writer, poet	
Irma Rangel		(1931–2003)	1994	State legislator	
Mary Beth Rogers		(1940–)	1994	Politician, civic worker	
Bess Whitehead Scott		(1890–1997)	1994	Communications, journalist, editor, poet, writer	
Francie Larrieu Smith		(1952–)	1994	Olympic athlete, track and field	
Hallie Stillwell		(1897–1997)	1994	Pioneer rancher, educator, author	
Alvia Wardlaw		(1947–)	1994	Educator, curator of African American history	
Martha Wong		(1939–)	1994	First Asian American woman elected to the Texas House of Representatives	
Eleanor Anne Young		(1925–2007)	1994	Scientist, nutritionist educator	
Linda Louise Craft		(1938–1993)	1993	Master Professional rank LPGA golfer	
Ernestine Glossbrenner		(1932–2012)	1993	Educator	
Gabrielle Kirk McDonald		(1942–)	1993	African American jurist	
Eleanor Montague		(1926–2018)	1993	Pioneered radiation for treatment of breast cancer	
Aaronetta Pierce		(1943–)	1993	African American patron of the arts and museums	
Gloria G. Rodriguez		(1948–)	1993	Children and families advocate	
Annette Strauss		(1924–1998)	1993	Philanthropist and Mayor of Dallas	
Barbara Bush		(1925–2018)	1989	First Lady of the United States	
Judith Craven		(1946–)	1989	Physician, medical field educator	
Gussie Nell Davis		(1906–1993)	1989	Founded the Kilgore Rangerettes	
Margaret Swan Forbes		(1919–2010)	1989	Synchronized swimming	
L. Ruth Guy		(1913–2006)	1989	Professor emeritus in the Department of Pathology at the University of Texas Southwestern Medical School	
Terry Hershey		(1923–2017)	1989	Environmentalist	
Lucia Rede Madrid		(1913–2006)	1989	Educator	
Jane Wetzel		(1931–)	1989	Advocate for youth rehabilitation	
Nancy Brinker		(1946–)	1988	Co-founder of Susan G. Komen for the Cure	
Margaret Pease Harper		(1911–1991)	1988	Patron of the arts	
Ninfa Laurenzo		(1924–2001)	1988	Restaurant entrepreneur	
Lane Murray		(1921–2009)	1988	Correctional educator	
Louise Ritter		(1958– )	1988	Olympic gold medalist	
Ruth Taubert Seeger		(1924–2014)	1988	Deaf athlete, medalist, coach	
Bert Kruger Smith		(1915–2004)	1988	Civic involvement	
Eleanor Tinsley		(1926–2009)	1988	Community involvement, Eleanor Tinsley Elementary School named for her	
Lucy G. Acosta		(1926–2008)	1987	Activist and humanitarian	
Ruth Sharp Altshuler		(1924–2017)	1987	Philanthropist	
Margaret Harris Amsler		(1908–2002)	1987	Attorney	
Johnnie Benson		(1929–)	1987	Health care in nursing homes	
Tommie Clack		(1882–1989)	1987	Pioneer	
Kim Dawson		(1924–2010)	1987	Business woman	
Lillian Dunlap		(1922–2003)	1987	Brigadier General, United States Army	
Elithe Hamilton Kirkland		(1907–1992)	1987	Writer	
Donna Lopiano		(1946–)	1987	Sports management consultant	
Katie Sherrod		(1946–)	1987	Journalist	
Donnya Stephens		(1941–2021)	1987	Educator	
Dora Dougherty Strother		(1921–2013)	1987	Aviation	
Mary Nan West		(1925–2001)	1987	Rancher	
Anne Armstrong		(1927–2008)	1986	American woman ambassador to Great Britain and the Court of St. James's	
Mary Kay Ash		(1918–2001)	1986	Founder Mary Kay Cosmetics	
Caro Crawford Brown		(1908–2001)	1986	Journalist, investigated political corruption of George Berham Parr	
Alicia R. Chacón		(1938–)	1986	Mexican-American member of El Paso city council, regional director of Small Business Administration under Jimmy Carter	
Jody Conradt		(1941–)	1986	Women's basketball coach at University of Texas at Austin	
Margaret Cousins		(1905–1996)	1986	Managing editor of McCall's Magazine, senior editor of Doubleday and Co., 1986 Women in Communications Lifetime Achievement Award. Poet, essayist, short story writer, author of children's books	
Wilhelmina Ruth Delco		(1929–)	1986	Texas state legislator	
Frances Goff		(1916–1994)	1986	Volunteerism	
Mary Lavinia Griffith		(1906–1993)	1986	Rancher	
May Owen		(1892–1988)	1986	First woman president of Texas Medical Association	
Sally Ride		(1951–2012)	1986	Astronaut, first American woman in space	
Ada Simond		(1903–1989)	1986	African American civic involvement	
Hermine Tobolowsky		(1921–1995)	1986	Proponent of the Equal Rights Amendment	
Benjy Frances Brooks		(1918–1998)	1985	First Texas pediatric surgeon	
Patricia Happ Buffler		(1938–2013)	1985	Epidemiology Research	
Liz Carpenter		(1920–2010)	1985	Political speechwriter, media consultant, great-great-granddaughter of Empresario Sterling C. Robertson	
Grace Woodruff Cartwright		(1908–2003)	1985	Agriculture, helped form the Brazos Valley Association	
Helen Farabee		(1934–1988)	1985	Mental health and human services advocate	
María Elena Flood		(1934–)	1985	Educator	
Willie Lee Glass		(1910–1999)	1985	Civic involvement and leadership	
Lydia Mendoza		(1916–2007)	1985	Tejano musician	
Jenny Lind Porter		(1927–2020)	1985	Poet Laureate of Texas	
Louise Raggio		(1919–2011)	1985	Attorney, first female director of the Texas State Bar	
Ann Richards		(1933–2006)	1985	Governor of Texas	
Edna Gardner Whyte		(1902–1992)	1985	Aviation pioneer	
Christia Adair		(1893–1989)	1984	African American suffragist and civil rights activist	
Kate Atkinson Bell		(1907–2003)	1984	Educator	
Vivian Castleberry		(1922–2017)	1984	Journalist, editor, author, activist	
Lila May Banks Cockrell		(1922–2019)	1984	Businesswoman, former mayor of San Antonio	
Clotilde Pérez García		(1917–2003)	1984	Author, medical professional	
Jeane Porter Hester		(1929–2018)	1984	Scientist, physician	
Oveta Culp Hobby		(1905–1995)	1984	Newspaper publisher, first commanding officer of Women's Army Corps, first secretary of Department of Health, Education, and Welfare	
Mary Evelyn Blagg Huey		(1922–2017)	1984	President Texas Woman's University	
Sarah Tilghman Hughes		(1896–1985)	1984	Texas state legislator, United States district judge, administered November 22, 1963, oath of office to Lyndon B. Johnson aboard Air Force One	
Lady Bird Johnson		(1912–2007)	1984	First Lady of the United States	
Barbara Jordan		(1936–1996)	1984	Politician	
Amy Freeman Lee		(1909–1997)	1984	Artist, writer	

== See also ==
- Awards and decorations of the Texas government
