= Amy Lee (disambiguation) =

Amy Lee (born 1981) is an American singer, songwriter, musician, and the lead vocalist of rock band Evanescence.

Amy Lee may also refer to:

- Ailee (stage name), American-born singer based in South Korea
- Amy Lee (saxophonist), American saxophonist, composer and arranger
- Amy Grant, American singer-songwriter, musician, author, media personality and actress
- Amy Freeman Lee (1914-2004), American artist, writer and lecturer
- Amy Lee of the Canadian clown duo Morro and Jasp

== See also ==
- Amy Fee
