= Grace W. Cartwright =

American rancher and conservationist

Grace Woodruff Cartwright (September 18, 1908 – February 20, 2003) was an American rancher and conservationist. She is "credited with helping build Weatherford’s park system, leading Texas in conservation and beautification projects, improving life in rural areas and encouraging higher education at the University of North Texas."

== Biography ==
Grace Woodruff was born in Paradise, Texas in 1908. She attended North Texas State Teachers College, graduating in 1929 with a degree in Home Economics. On November 28, 1931, she married rancher E. B. Cartwright. They settled south of Weatherford, Texas.

Cartwright worked as an extension agent for Texas A&M University. In 1949, she became the first woman to sit on the board of regents for the University of North Texas. Cartwright transplanted hundreds of trees from her ranch to the university's stadium. She also endowed more than a dozen scholarships at the university.

On March 8, 1949, Cartwright founded the Garden Study Club of Weatherford, "to stimulate and encourage interest in gardening, the study of landscaping and improvement of home grounds, the study and protection of native flora and birds, and the preservation of points of natural beauty." Around this same time, Cartwright succeeded in a campaign to bring modern services to Tin Top, Parker County, Texas.

Cartwright organized the Brazos Valley Association after the Brazos River flooded in 1957.

Cartwright was inducted into the Texas Women's Hall of Fame in 1985. She also won a Lady Bird Johnson Environmental Award from Keep America Beautiful. Cartwright Park in Weatherford is named after her.
