= Patricia Happ Buffler =

Epidemiologist and cancer researcher

- Scientific career
- Fields: epidemiology and cancer research
- Institutions: University of California at Berkeley
- Notable students: Melissa Bondy

Patricia Happ Buffler (August 1, 1938 — September 26, 2013) was an American epidemiologist and cancer researcher, known for her work on childhood leukemia and environmental health. She was dean of the School of Public Health at the University of California at Berkeley, and was inducted into the Texas Women's Hall of Fame in 1985.

== Early life and education ==
Patricia A. Happ was born in Doylestown, Pennsylvania. She attended Catholic University of America, where she earned a bachelor's degree in 1960, in nursing and biology. As a young woman Happ worked as a public health nurse in Harlem. After moving to California in the 1960s, she pursued graduate studies at Berkeley, earning a master's degree in public health administration in 1965, and completing doctoral work in epidemiology in 1963. Her dissertation was titled "Coronary Risk Factors in Japanese-Caucasian Mixed Marriages," and followed the health of Japanese war brides, whose environments changed dramatically between childhood to adulthood.

== Career ==
Buffler was on the faculty at the University of Texas from 1974 to 1991, finishing her time there as a professor of epidemiology at the School of Public Health in Houston. While in Texas, she launched a study of liver cancer in the state, focused on industrial exposure. Her work was recognized in 1985 when she was inducted into the Texas Women's Hall of Fame. She was inducted into the Galveston Women's Hall of Fame that same year.

In 1995, Buffler launched the California Childhood Leukemia Study, one of the largest and broadest studies of its kind. She also headed the Center for Integrative Research on Childhood Leukemia and the Environment, begun in 2001. She formed the Childhood Leukemia International Forum in 2006, to link studies across national borders.

Buffler was an expert advisor to the World Health Organization, the United States Department of Energy, the Environmental Protection Agency, and others. She was a fellow of the American Association for the Advancement of Science, and served on the Texas Air Control Board's Research Advisory Council.

== Personal life ==
Patricia Happ married Richard Thurman Buffler, a geologist, in 1962. They had two children, and lived for three years in Alaska. Patricia Happ Buffler died suddenly in her office at age 75. At the time of her death, she was president elect of the International Epidemiological Association.
