= Bess Whitehead Scott =

American journalist (1890–1997)

- Born: December 13, 1890
- Died: December 27, 1997 (aged 107)
- Occupation: Journalist
- Known for: Accomplishments in reporting, public relations, advertising, and teaching

Bess Whitehead Scott (December 13, 1890 – December 27, 1997) was an American journalist from the early to mid 20th century. Scott is known for her accomplishments in reporting, public relations, advertising, and teaching. Scott is a noteworthy figure because she influenced journalism for women, and helped demonstrate that women are capable in the workplace.

== Biography ==
Without any newspaper background, in 1915 Scott became the first female news reporter at The Houston Post. She talked her way into the job by reminding the company that all male reporters would be called to service in World War 1. At the time, most Texas newspapers only hired women for society and club reporting. She continued her journalism career until 1940.

She later taught journalism at Milby High School in Houston and worked in advertising during World War II. She also had a career as an author, writing two screenplays, two journalism textbooks, and an autobiography. She helped establish and served as the editor at the Texas Federation of Business and Professional Women.

== Awards ==
- Distinguished Alumna recognition, Baylor University (1992)
- Outstanding Alumna recognition, University of Mary Hardin-Baylor (1992)
- Member of the Texas Women's Hall of Fame (1994)

== Bess Whitehead Scholarship Fund ==
The Bess Whitehead Scholarship Fund was created in her honor in 1991.
