= Deborah Tucker =

American activist and executive

- Occupations: activist and executive
- Known for: Founded the first shelter in the United States for battered women

Deborah D. Tucker is an American activist and executive who founded the first shelter in the United States for victims of domestic violence and their children. In 2014, she was inducted into the Texas Women's Hall of Fame.

== Work and activism ==
While she was in her twenties, Tucker began volunteer work at the first rape crisis center in Austin, Texas in 1973. In that same year, she became employed by the center as Assistant Director, and worked in that position until 1975. She went on to co-found the Austin Center for Battered Women, and was the executive director of the center for five years from 1977 until 1982. This center was the first in the United States to serve victims of domestic violence and their children. In 1982 she was the first executive director of the Texas Council on Family Violence. She held the position until 1996. In 1998, Tucker and Sarah Buel founded the National Center on Domestic and Sexual Violence to advocate for issues related to domestic violence at the national level in the United States. Tucker helped to pass the Violence Against Women Act by acting as the founding chair of the National Network to End Domestic Violence. She also participated in the Department of Defense Task Force on Domestic Violence. She served from 2000-2003 as the co-chair of the task force, as appointed by then-president George W. Bush and then-Secretary-of-State Donald Rumsfeld. She currently serves as the executive director of the National Center for Domestic Violence. For her work, Tucker has received numerous honors and awards, including Public Citizen of the Year by the National Association of Social Workers, and the Standing In The Light of Justice Award and the Marshall Domestic Violence Peace Prize both by the National Network to End Domestic Violence.

== Further resources ==
- A video interview with Deborah Tucker about her work
- An interview with Deborah Tucker about domestic violence in the military
- An essay by Tucker about the Violence Against Women Act
