= Melissa Bondy =

American cancer epidemiologist

- Education: University of Texas at Austin; UTHealth School of Public Health
- Scientific career
- Fields: Cancer epidemiology
- Workplaces: UTHealth School of Public Health; MD Anderson Cancer Center; Baylor University; Stanford University
- Doctoral advisor: Louise C. Strong
- Other academic advisors: Patricia Happ Buffler

Melissa Lynn Bondy is an American cancer epidemiologist serving as the chair of the department of epidemiology and population health at Stanford University School of Medicine.

== Life ==
Bondy earned a B.A. in psychology from the University of Texas at Austin in 1975. She earned a M.S. (1982) in epidemiology with a focus on environmental science and a Ph.D. (1990) in epidemiology from the UTHealth School of Public Health. Her dissertation is titled, Genetic Epidemiology of Childhood Brain Tumors. Louise C. Strong was her dissertation supervisor. Patricia Happ Buffler was her academic advisor.

From 2001 to 2013, Bondy served as the director and professor in the center for childhood cancer epidemiology and prevention at the UTHealth School of Public Health. She was a professor in the department of epidemiology in the division of cancer prevention at the MD Anderson Cancer Center from 2002 to 2011. From 2011 to 2016, she was a professor in the department of pediatrics at Baylor College of Medicine. She served as the section head of epidemiology and population sciences from 2016 to 2019. In 2019, she became the inaugural chair and professor of the department of epidemiology and population health at Stanford University School of Medicine.

Bondy was married to writer Morris Edelson until his death in 2017.
