= Linda Louise Craft =

Linda Louise Craft (1939–1993) was an American golfer.

== Biography ==
Linda Louise Craft was born in Jacksboro, Texas in 1939. She attended Louisiana State University to study clinical psychology.

Craft started playing golf when she was twenty-six years old. During her career, she toured with Ladies Professional Golf Association and founded a golf school, Craft-Zavichas Golf School.

In 1993, Craft was included in the Texas Women's Hall of Fame.

== Awards ==
- Ben Hogan Award
- Governor's Victory Award
- LPGA Ellen Griffin Rolex Award
- American Cancer Society Award
