= Anne Corn =

American educator, author, researcher and advocate

- Born: New York City, United States
- Education: Columbia University (Ed.D)
- Occupations: Educator, researcher

Anne Lesley Corn is an American educator, author, researcher, and advocate for those with low vision or blindness. Corn herself has low vision—she is legally blind—and her personal experience has informed and inspired her research and advocacy.

When Corn was young she adamantly refused to use a white cane when walking, later explaining that she "felt comfortable with using combined visual and auditory methods".

Corn accepted a position at the University of Texas in 1980. In 1992 she began teaching at Vanderbilt University, where she currently holds the title of professor emerita. While at Vanderbilt she instrumental in developing the Providing Access to the Visual Environment (PAVE) program, designed to assist children with low vision. PAVE, run by the Vanderbilt Eye Institute and funded by the Tennessee Department of Education, is a grant program providing services to children aged 3–21.

Most recently she has conducted research at the University of Cincinnati's ophthalmology department.

In 2012, Corn was inducted into the Texas Women's Hall of Fame. She has served on the boards of multiple organizations, including Prevent Blindness Texas. She lives in Austin, Texas.

== Works published ==
- Corn, Anne Lesley; Koenig, Alan J. (1996). Foundations of Low Vision: Clinical and Functional Perspectives. New York: AFB Press. ISBN 9780891289418. OCLC 492909182.
