= Hermine Tobolowsky =

American activist

Hermine Tobolowsky (13 January 1921 – 25 July 1995) was an American activist for the Equal Rights Amendment. She is also known as the "Mother of the Texas Equal Rights Amendment."

== Life and education ==
Hermine was born Hermine Dalkowitz in San Antonio, Texas in 1921 to Maurice Dalkowitz and Nora Brown Dalkowitz. She had one brother, Marcus Dalkowitz. Her father immigrated from Lithuania when he was fourteen years old. Her mother was born in Belton, Texas. Her mother earned a business degree, against the wishes of her parents. Hermine's parents started a successful retail business, and were actively engaged in political activism. Her father encouraged her, from a young age, to become a lawyer. For grade school, Hermine attended public school in San Antonio.

For her undergraduate education, Hermine attended Incarnate Word College in San Antonio from 1938 to 1939, and then transferred to the University of San Antonio, which is now the Trinity University. She obtained her law degree from the University of Texas School of Law. She was one of ten women and 350 men in her incoming class. Hermine later remarked that she, and the other women, was made to feel "less than welcome" by professors and other students. For example, one of her professors gave her a list of "eligible men" in the program that she could marry and then "drop out" of school, implying that there was no other purpose for her enrollment there than for her to "find an eligible man." Another professor remarked that he automatically gave ten points less on assignments to female students. While a student, she served on the Texas Law Review. She graduated with her law degree in 1943, and was ranked among the top ten percent of students in her graduating class. She was one of the top ten students in her class. Out of the ten women that started in her class, she was one of two to complete her degree.

Hermine married a retail executive, Hyman Tobolowsky, in 1951. She was introduced to him by her aunt in 1950. Hyman reportedly proposed marriage to her on their second date. Hyman died in 1968. The couple had no children. Hermine died in 1995 of complications from diabetes.

== Career and activism ==
After graduating, Tobolowsky experienced a series of delays in getting employed. She remarked that she had to do so due to discrimination – she wished to get a position on the editorial board of the Texas Law Review, but found out through a male professor of hers that the articles she wrote to obtain the position were continually rejected due to her gender. The same professor ensured that her articles were then accepted, and thus Tobolowsky obtained a position on the editorial board. The dean of her college, Charles McCormick, arranged for her to interview as a law clerk for the Texas Supreme Court. However, she was reportedly turned down because she was a woman.

She became employed by a law firm in San Antonio. Said firm had tried to recruit her, and finally was able to recruit her when they let her prepare a brief for a case that was heard before the Texas Supreme Court. The case involved racial discrimination. Four years after joining the firm, Hermine opened her own private practice.

Tobolowsky moved to Dallas, and became involved in the Texas Federation of Business and Professional Women's Club. The club sought to end sex-based discrimination, and the Texas Equal Rights Amendment was a project of theirs. Tobolowsky became vocally involved in advocacy and debates for equal rights, including written rebuttals against people opposed to equal rights. For two years, Hermine researched sexual discrimination in the law, and her research became the basis for the Texas Equal Rights Amendment. In 1957, she first approached the Texas legislature about an Equal Rights Amendment. She became president of the Texas Federation of Business and Professional Women's Club in 1959, and further advocated for the Equal Legal Rights Amendment. She traveled around the state advocating for the amendment. Tobolowsky's fight for the amendment is argued to have led to the Marital Property Act in 1967, as its legislation was drafted to undercut the need for the Equal Legal Rights Amendment. The amendment was passed in 1972, after being introduced in every session since 1959. After the law's passage, Towbolowsky began to work for a national-level version of the Equal Rights Amendment. She was a nationally recognized speaker and women's activist, and served as a legal advisor for various women's organizations. After the national version of the Equal Rights Amendment failed to be passed, she continued a nationwide struggle for equal rights, including trying to pass an Equal Rights Amendment in Iowa.

== Honors and awards ==
In 1972 and 1974, she was named one of the Top News Shapers in Dallas by the Dallas Times Herald. In 1975, she was named the Woman of the Year by the Texas Women's Political Caucus. In 1976, she won the Texas Woman in History Award from the Texas Federation of Business and Professional Women's Clubs. Tobolowsky won the Women Helping Women Award from the Dallas Women's Center in 1979, as well as the same-named award from Soroptomist International. The University of Texas Law school named the Hermine Tobolowsky Award in her honor in 1982. Tobolowsky was also inducted into the Texas Women's Hall of Fame in 1986. The Texas Business and Professional Women's Foundation offers the Hermoine Dalkowitz Tobolowsky Scholarship for women who seek to reduce sex-based discrimination through legislation.

== Personal life ==
Hermine Tobolowsky was the aunt of character actor, director, writer and podcaster Stephen Tobolowsky
