= Margaret Cousins (editor) =

American editor, journalist, and writer (1905–1996)

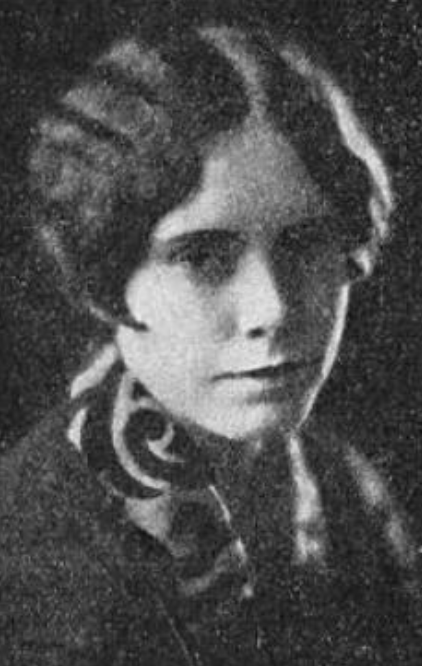
- Cousins, from a 1930 publication
- Born: Sue Margaret Cousins; January 26, 1905; Munday, Texas, United States of America
- Died: July 30, 1996 (aged 91); San Antonio, Texas, United States of America
- Education: University of Texas at Austin
- Occupations: Editor, journalist, and writer
- Writing career
- Genre: Fiction
- Notable work: The Life of Lucy Gallant
- Notable awards: D.A. Frank Poetry Prize J.C. Penney-University of Missouri Award for Excellence in Magazine Writing Friends of the San Antonio Public Library Arts and Letters Award Women-in-Communications Headliner Award for Lifetime Achievement George Washington Medal of the Freedom Foundation of Valley Forge

Sue Margaret Cousins (January 26, 1905 – July 30, 1996) was an American editor, journalist, and writer. Cousins was a member of St. Mark's Episcopal Church, the Authors Guild, the Texas Institute of Letters, the Philosophical Society of Texas, the San Antonio Conservation Society, and a trustee of the Wildflower Foundation.

Some of her works were published under the pseudonyms William Masters, Mary Parrish, and Avery Johns.

== Early life and education ==
Sue Margaret Cousins was born in Munday, Texas, on January 26, 1905, to parents Walter Henry and Sue Margaret Reeves Cousins. Her father was a pharmacist who published the Dallas-based Southern Pharmaceutical Journal. She has a brother named Walter Henry Cousins Jr, a niece named Cynthia Cousins Lodge, and a nephew named Walter Henry Cousins III.

Cousins develop an interest in literature at an early age. She made her first publication (a poem) at the age of 16.

Cousins grew up in Texas and graduated from the now defunct Dallas High School (Texas) (formerly named Bryant Street High School) in 1922. She went on to pursue a Bachelor of Arts in English Literature from the College of Liberal Arts at the University of Texas at Austin. Cousins joined the Alpha Chi Omega fraternity during her time in college. She graduated with her B.A. degree in 1926, winning the D.A. Frank Poetry Prize in the process.

== Career ==
Cousins began her literary career as an apprentice with her father's pharmaceutical journal after graduation from college. She remained with the organization until 1937, being promoted to associate editor and editor in 1930 and 1935, respectively.

Cousins moved to New York City in 1937 to pursue opportunities with the Pictorial Review. The magazine ceased publication in 1939, and Cousins went on to work a copy editor role with Hearst Magazines, Inc. While at Hearst, Cousins served as the managing editor of the magazine publications Good Housekeeping and McCall's. In 1961, she became a senior editor at Doubleday, and in 1970 she was briefly a special editor at Holt, Rinehart & Winston. She later worked as fiction and book editor for Ladies' Home Journal.

== Works ==
Cousins wrote more than 200 short stories, including "The Life of Lucy Gallant", which was adapted into a Paramount Pictures film in 1955.

Some of her other notable works include:

Uncle Edgar and the Reluctant Saint (1948)
Ben Franklin of Old Philadelphia (1952)
We Were There at the Battle of the Alamo (1958)
Thomas Alva Edison (1965)
A Christmas Gift (1952)
Traffic with Evil (1957)
The Boy in the Alamo (1983)

In addition, Cousins also edited the anthology Love and Marriage (1961) and the memoirs of President Lyndon B. Johnson and First Lady Lady Bird Johnson.

Cousins also served as a ghost writer for Margaret Truman's Souvenir (1956).

== Retirement and death ==
Cousins retired in 1973 and moved to San Antonio. In 1986, she was inducted into the Texas Women's Hall of Fame.

She died in San Antonio on July 30, 1996.
