= University of Mary Hardin–Baylor =

Christian university in Texas, US

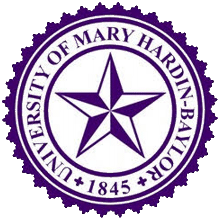
- Former names: Female Department of Baylor University (1851–1886); Baylor Female College (1886–1925); Baylor College for Women (1925–1934); Mary Hardin–Baylor College (1934–1978)
- Motto: Education for Life, Experience of a Lifetime
- Type: Private university
- Established: 1845; 181 years ago (as part of Baylor University)
- Religious affiliation: Baptist
- Academic affiliations: Baptist General Convention of Texas; CCCU; NAICU
- Endowment: $132.25 million
- President: Randy O'Rear
- Faculty: 330
- Students: 3,914
- Undergraduates: 3,335
- Postgraduates: 375
- Doctoral students: 204
- Location: Belton, Texas, U.S. 31.0665°N 97.4640°W
- Campus: Suburban, 170 acres (69 ha)
- Colors: (Purple and gold)
- Nickname: Crusaders
- Sporting affiliations: NCAA Division III – ASC
- Mascot: CRUnk the Crusader
- Website: umhb.edu
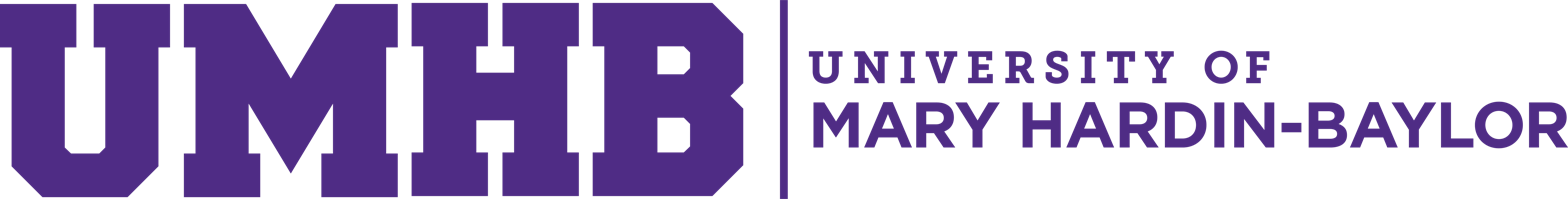

The University of Mary Hardin–Baylor (UMHB) is a private Baptist university in Belton, Texas. UMHB was chartered by the Republic of Texas in 1845 as Baylor Female College, the female department of what is now Baylor University. It has since become its own institution and grown to 3,914 students and awards degrees at the baccalaureate, master's, and doctoral levels. It is affiliated with the Baptist General Convention of Texas and accredited by the Southern Association of Colleges and Schools Commission on Colleges.

== History ==
UMHB's history dates to the time before Texas became a U.S. state. Its original charter was granted by the Republic of Texas (prior to statehood) in 1845 as the female department of Baylor University. Classes began in May 1846, in a small wooden building on a hillside at Independence in Washington County. The first class consisted of 24 male and female students. While it was a coeducational institution, the classes were still separated by gender.

Baylor College's coeducation lasted only until 1851, when it was divided into a Female Department and a Male Department. Each began occupying separate buildings about a mile apart at the Independence campus.

The changing demography of Texas and relocation of the local railroad made it increasingly difficult for college students to get transportation to Independence. Both colleges were relocated in 1886 to their permanent homes in Central Texas: the women's division relocated to Belton, where operations continued as Baylor Female College, and the men's division moved to Waco, merged with coeducational Waco University, and continued as Baylor University.

The Cottage Home System, the first work-study program for women in a college west of the Mississippi, was instituted on the new Belton campus in 1893 by Elli Moore Townsend, wife of the serving president. Its aim was to provide more affordable housing for women students who could not meet the expense of dormitories. The women students earned financial assistance by growing vegetables, raising livestock, and hand making crafts and quality clothing items. Initially the cottages were modest wood frame residences. In 1905, a permanent residence hall for the Cottage Home System was built by the residents themselves.

Beginning in 1922, a few male students, known as "Campus Boys", were allowed to attend classes and work on campus through their junior year, at which time they transferred to Baylor University or another college for their senior year and graduation. "Campus Boys" did work that was deemed unsuitable for the young ladies. They maintained the grounds, unloaded coal from rail cars, milked cows, fed hogs, served as night watchmen, and unstopped drains. They lived on the second floor of a carpenter shop in quarters dubbed "The Shack".

In 1925, Baylor Female College was renamed Baylor College for Women. A year later, it was accredited by the Southern Association of Colleges and Universities, being the first Texas Baptist college to do so. Then in 1927, it received accreditation from the American Association of Colleges. In 1925, enrollment peaked at 2,372, which forced the college to start a costly building project. That, in addition to a devastating campus fire in 1929, required immediate construction of even more buildings, and with the help of the Great Depression, brought the college to the edge of bankruptcy. It was saved by a private donation from Mary and John G. Hardin. In gratitude, the college changed its name to Mary Hardin–Baylor College in 1934.

In 1968, the Scott and White College of Nursing, named for the Scott and White Memorial Hospital located in nearby Temple, became a part of Mary Hardin–Baylor College.

Mary Hardin–Baylor College once again became fully coeducational in 1971. August of that year had the first male graduates, including three males receiving bachelor's degrees. With the inauguration in 1978 of its first graduate program, a master of education, the college achieved status as a university with five schools: Arts and Sciences, Creative Arts, Business, Education, and Nursing. At that same time, it was renamed the University of Mary Hardin–Baylor.

== Academics ==
The school has 119 undergraduate majors and 13 graduate degree programs, including several master's degrees and two doctoral programs. Qualified students can participate in engaged learning through internships with businesses and industries. Study abroad programs are offered on three continents.

UMHB comprises eight colleges: The McLane College of Business, College of Christian Studies, College of Education, College of Humanities and Sciences, Scott and White College of Nursing, College of Visual and Performing Arts, and the Graduate School.

== Notable alumni ==
- Miriam 'Ma' Ferguson, Texas' first female governor and the second woman to be inaugurated governor of any state in the U.S.
- Jerrell Freeman, Canadian and American football linebacker
- Buddy Groom, Major League Baseball pitcher, 1992–2005
- Oveta Culp Hobby, the first woman appointed as a commanding officer of a military unit, the first director of the Women's Army Corps, the first Secretary of the United States Department of Health, Education and Welfare, and the second woman to serve in a US cabinet
- Blake Jackson, American football wide receiver
- Bess Whitehead Scott, pioneering Texas journalist and the first woman news reporter in Houston
- Lucy Wilson Rice, Texas painter

== Athletics ==
The UMHB Crusaders, or "The Cru", compete in Division III (NCAA) as a member of the American Southwest Conference (ASC). UMHB was formerly a member of the NAIA before becoming a full member of the NCAA Division III following the 1999–2000 school year. UMHB held dual membership in the NAIA and NCAA during a provisional period, as UMHB was transitioning to the NCAA.

UMHB sponsors 16 varsity athletic programs, seven men's and nine women's:

Men's sports

- Baseball
- Basketball
- Cross country
- Football
- Golf
- Soccer
- Tennis

Women's sports

- Acrobatic gymnastics and Tumbling (sport)
- Beach Volleyball
- Basketball
- Cross country
- Golf
- Soccer
- Softball
- Tennis
- Volleyball

=== Athletic achievements ===
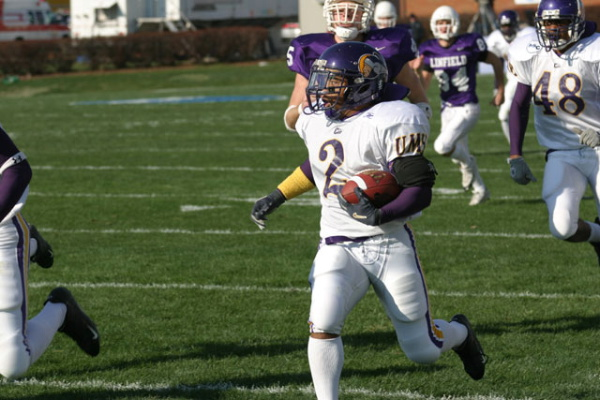
Tim Walker charges towards the end zone on a punt return against Linfield in the NCAA Div III Championship Game

The Crusaders have won four national championships and seven national runner-up finishes:

- The Lady Crusader golf team won the 2000 NAIA Women's Golf Championship and the 2013 NCAA Division III Women's Golf Championship.
- The Lady Crusader golf team posted four straight second-place finishes at the NCAA National Tournament from 2002 to 2005.
- The women's basketball and men's baseball teams both posted national runner-up finishes in the NAIA.
- The men's basketball team finished as the NCAA national runner up in 2013.
- The football team won the NCAA Division III Championship in 2016, 2018 and 2021 and finished as the NCAA national runner-up in 2004 and 2017. However the 2016 championship is now vacated under NCAA sanctions.
- The football team has the highest winning percentage of any team in the entire NCAA across all three divisions, with a winning percentage of .856.
- The football team won the ASC in football 19 times in 2002, 2005, 2006, 2007, 2008, 2009, 2010, 2011, 2012, 2013, 2014, 2015, 2016, 2017, 2018, 2019, 2020-21 (in the spring season), 2021, 2022.
- UMHB athletic programs have won or shared a combined total of 13 conference championships in the ASC.
- The men's golf team won the 2008 and 2009 ASC golf championships and have won four conference championships overall. The team also qualified for the NCAA Division III National Championship in 2008 and 2009
- The first athlete from the UMHB football program to make the jump from college into the NFL was linebacker Jerrell Freeman, who signed a free agent contract with the Tennessee Titans in 2008, then moved to the Saskatchewan Roughriders of the CFL for three seasons. Freeman would return to the NFL to play four seasons with the Indianapolis Colts. In the spring of 2016, he signed as an unrestricted free agent with the Chicago Bears.

== Student life ==
=== LGBT prohibitions ===
In 2015 the university was granted an exception to Title IX allowing it to exclude LGBT student organizations for religious reasons. In 2016 the organization Campus Pride ranked the college among the worst schools in Texas for LGBT students.

The UMHB Student Handbook prohibits homosexual behavior.

=== Easter Pageant ===
For 79 consecutive years the University of Mary Hardin–Baylor has produced an outdoor reproduction of the Holy Week. Each year the pageant takes place on the Wednesday afternoon before Easter and is performed on campus in front of Luther Memorial. The Easter Pageant is fully produced by the students of UMHB themselves, including directing, costumes, and performances and draws nearly 5,000 viewers each year.

=== Charter Day ===
Charter Day is an annual tradition that celebrates the charter signing on February 1, 1845. The event is held during chapel service on the first Wednesday in February. During the service, seniors sing the alumni/senior song, "Up with the Purple". At the conclusion of the service, seniors traditionally place a wreath of flowers on the grave of Judge R.E.B. Baylor, located in the courtyard.

=== Homecoming ===
Homecoming provides opportunities for graduates and former students to return to campus and connect with former classmates and the university. The first Homecoming was held in 1909, and over the years has been held in either the fall or spring. Students and alumni together celebrate Homecoming in the fall to include football activities. Selection of the Homecoming Court and the pep rally with fireworks are some of the new events established by students.

=== Robing ceremony ===
Robing symbolizes the passing of the student leadership from the senior class to the junior class. The specific origin of the robing ceremony is not known, but it may have occurred as early as 1902. Seniors place their caps and gowns on the juniors, and this is the first time the juniors are allowed to sing the alumni/senior song, "Up with the Purple". Since 2007, Robing has been held on the Friday of Midnight March with Class Ring Ceremony.

=== Midnight March ===
At midnight a few weeks before Spring Commencement, seniors in regalia march with lighted candles around Vann Circle Drive. As they sing the senior/alumni song, they stop to light the candles of special friends and alumni. In the early stages of the Midnight March, the dormitory residents witness the March inside of their dark rooms. Later during the ceremony, the residents migrate into the hallway so senior friends can light their candles. Due to fire codes, however, the March was moved outdoors.

=== Stunt Night ===
Stunt Night is a competition among the four classes that builds a bond between members and creates class spirit. It began in 1909 when George Rosborough, the physical education instructor, initiated Stunt Night to give the campus residents, who could not go home, an activity during the Christmas holidays. The Stunt Night committee selects a theme for the event, allowing the class directors time to prepare a skit and an original song. The winning class has the honor of decorating the Stunt Night blanket which is then displayed in the Musick Alumni Center and Museum for a year.

=== Dubbing Ceremony ===
In the spring of 1995, students requested a ceremony to create closer emotional ties to the university. Subsequently, a "Dubbing Ceremony" became part of Welcome Week. Each fall new students are "dubbed" with a ceremonial sword by the university administration as "Crusaders Forever", Prior to the ceremony, students light candles and sing the Alma Mater. Immediately following the ceremony, the sophomores ring the sophomore bell the number of years the university has been in existence.

=== Miss MHB Pageant ===
The Pageant provides young women opportunities to gain confidence and poise and to develop friendships through competition. The pageant has evolved over the years into a two-evening, primarily student-produced event. Classes and student organizations select representatives and judges interview the contestants, listen to their platforms, and evaluate them on the group dance, individual talent and evening gown stroll. Miss MHB and three runners-up are named, and each one receives a scholarship for the semester following their selection.

=== Crusader Knights ===
The Class of 1994 held the first Crusader Knights in the Fall of 1993. It is a two-night, themed event for the men of UMHB. The competition includes a group opening number, short video-skits created by the participants showing their personality and talent, and the individuals walking in evening attire. The winner is dubbed Mr. Crusader Knight by the university president.

== Gallery ==
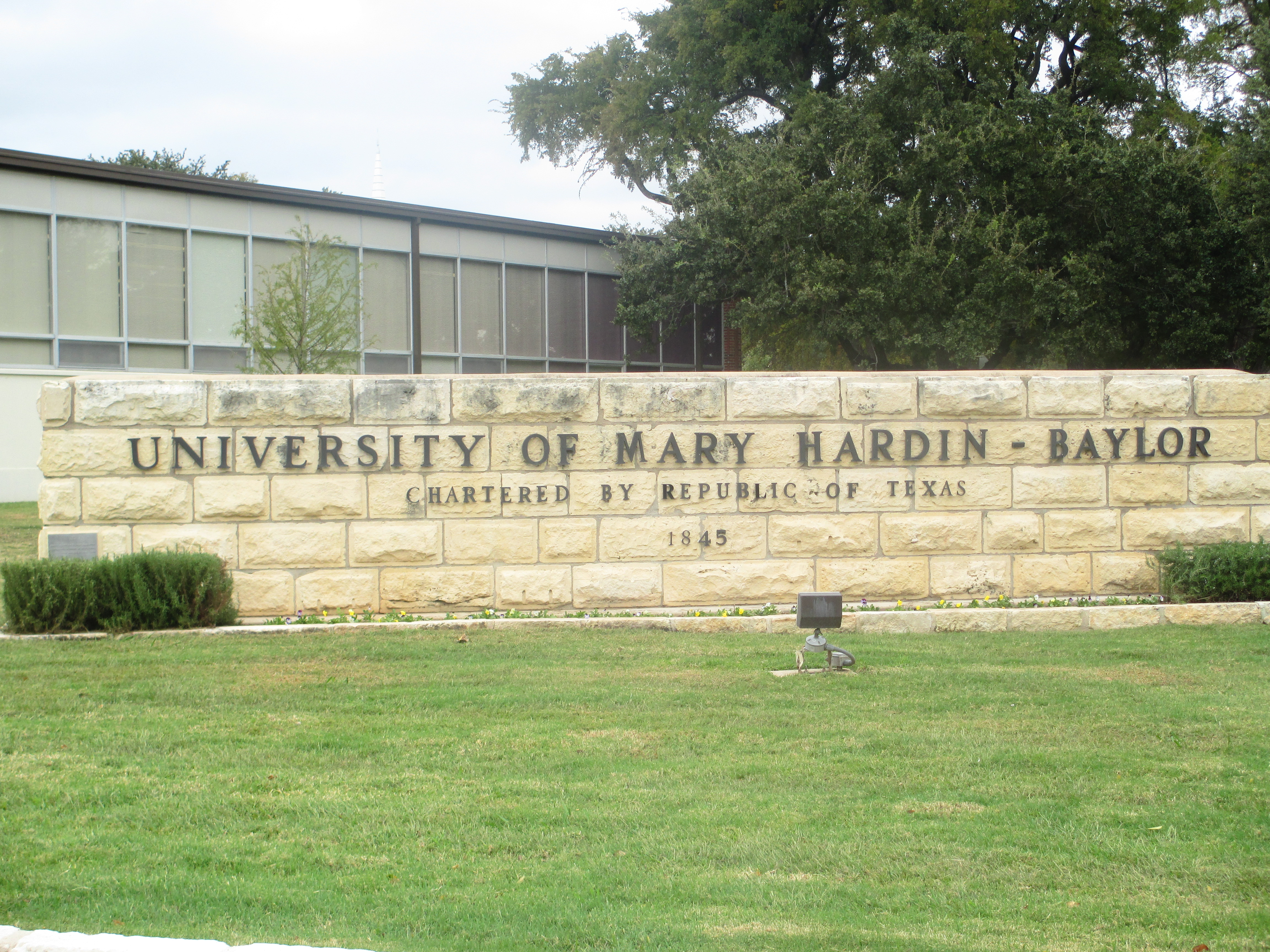
UMHB entrance sign

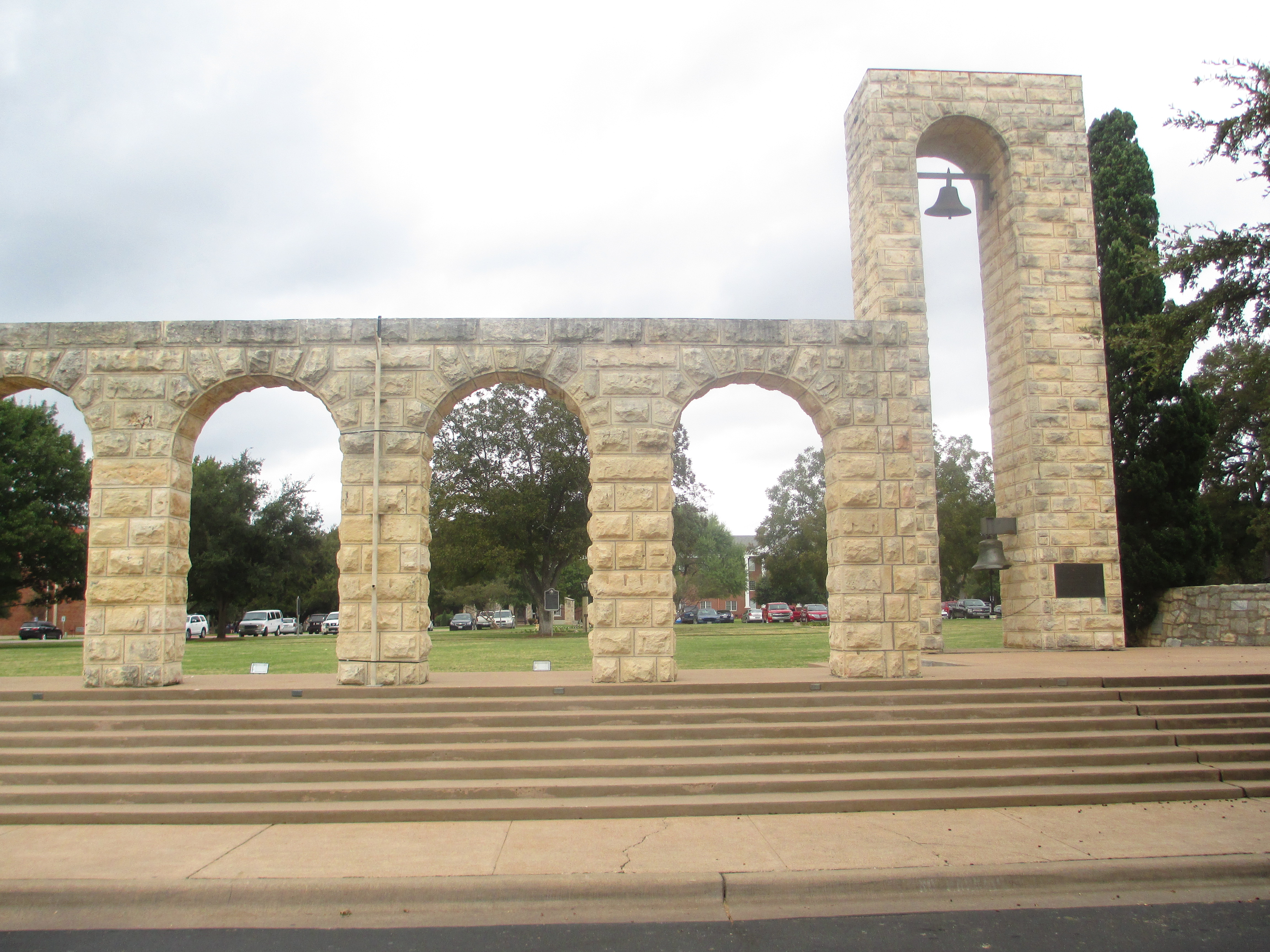
Luther Memorial

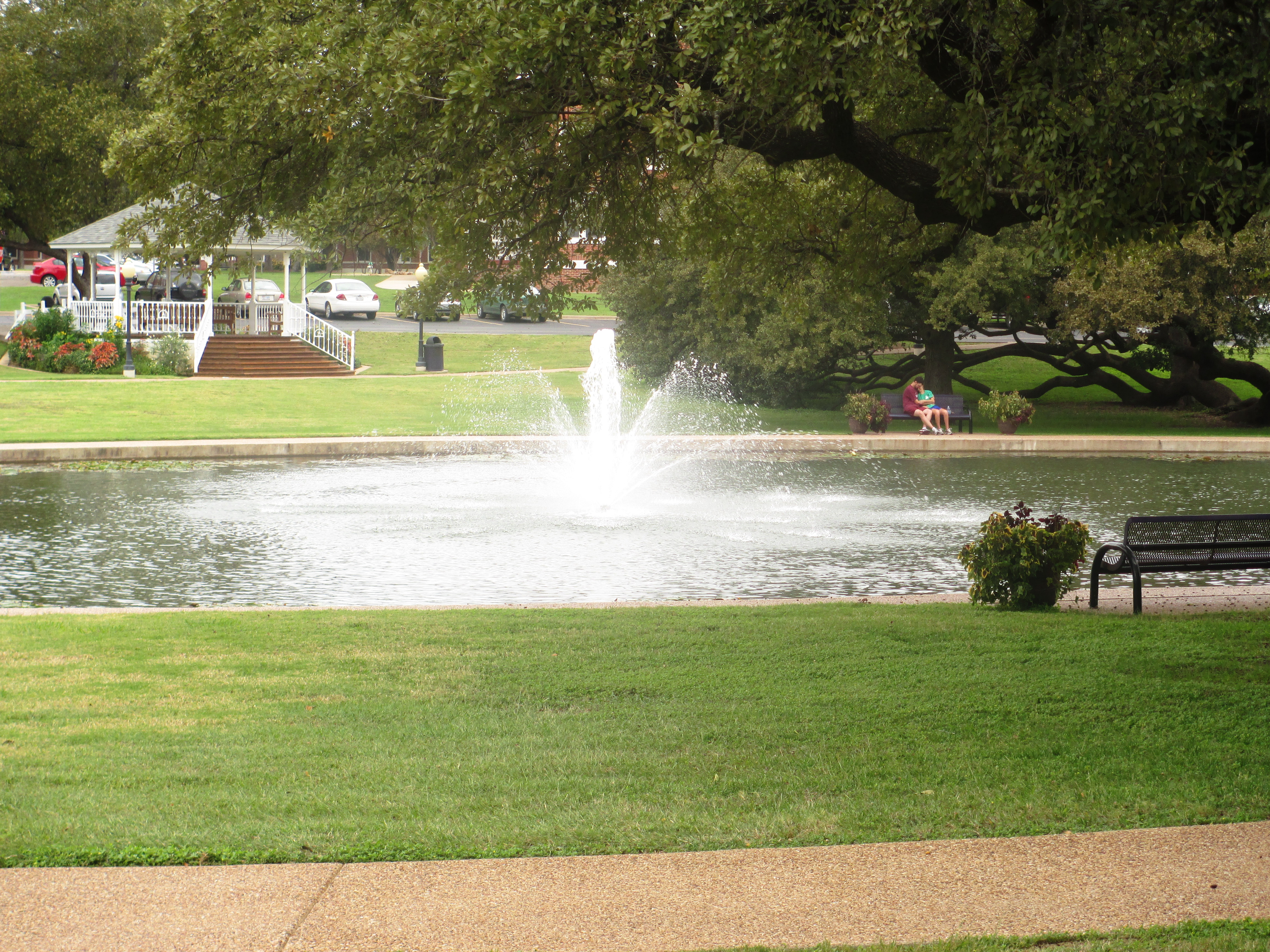
Burt Pond

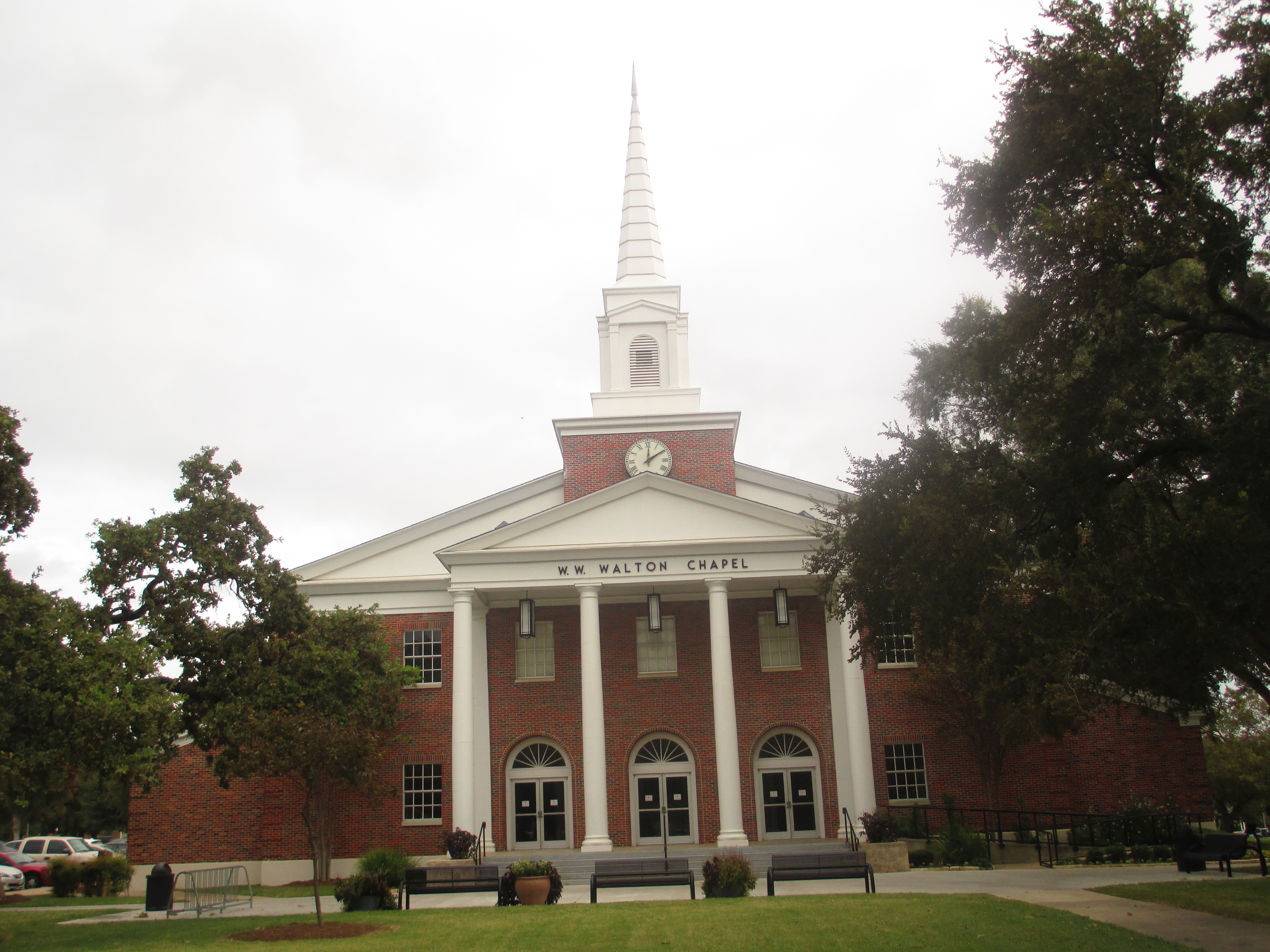
UMHB's W. W. Walton Chapel

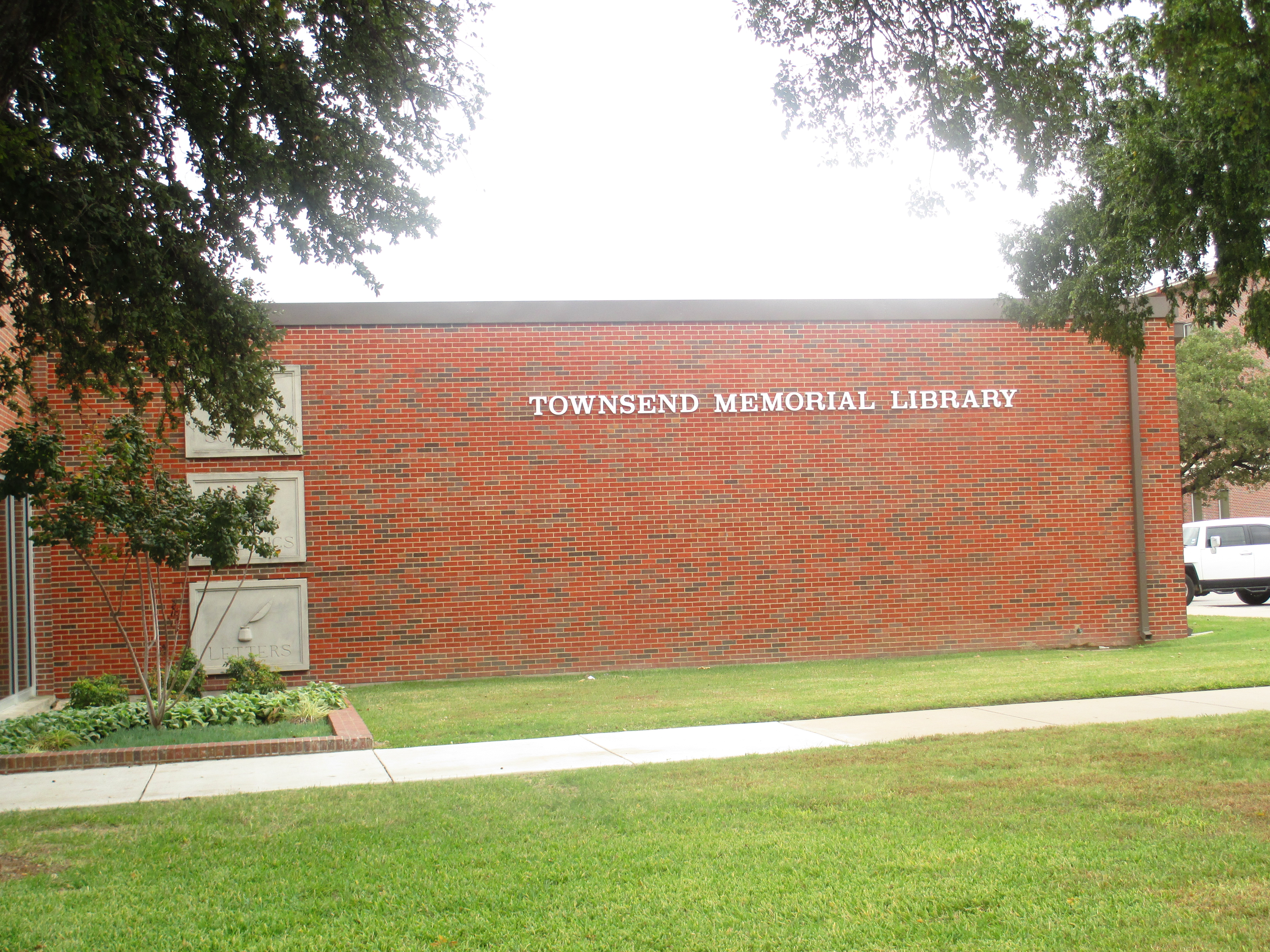
Townsend Memorial Library

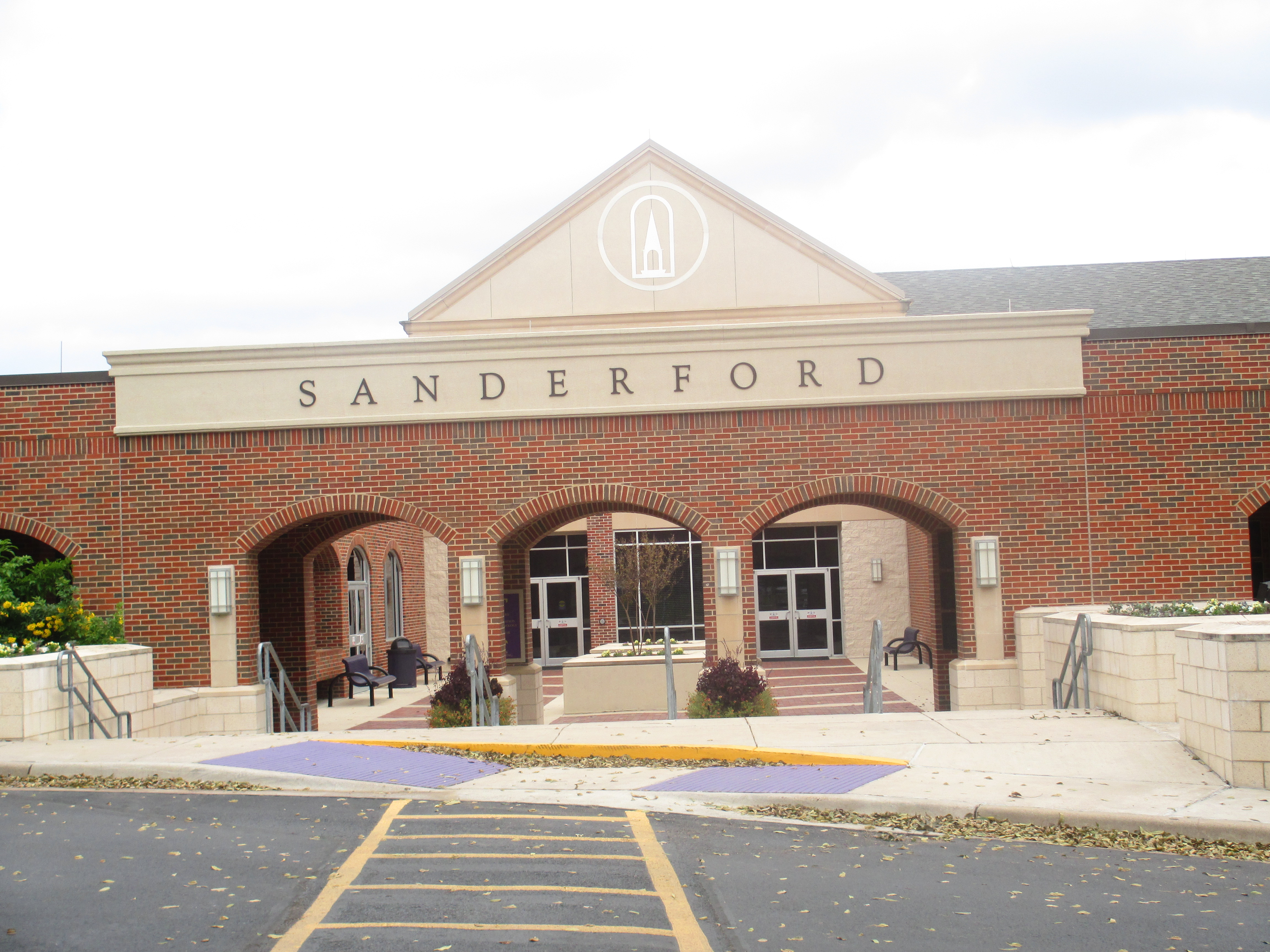
Sanderford Hall, the UMHB administration building

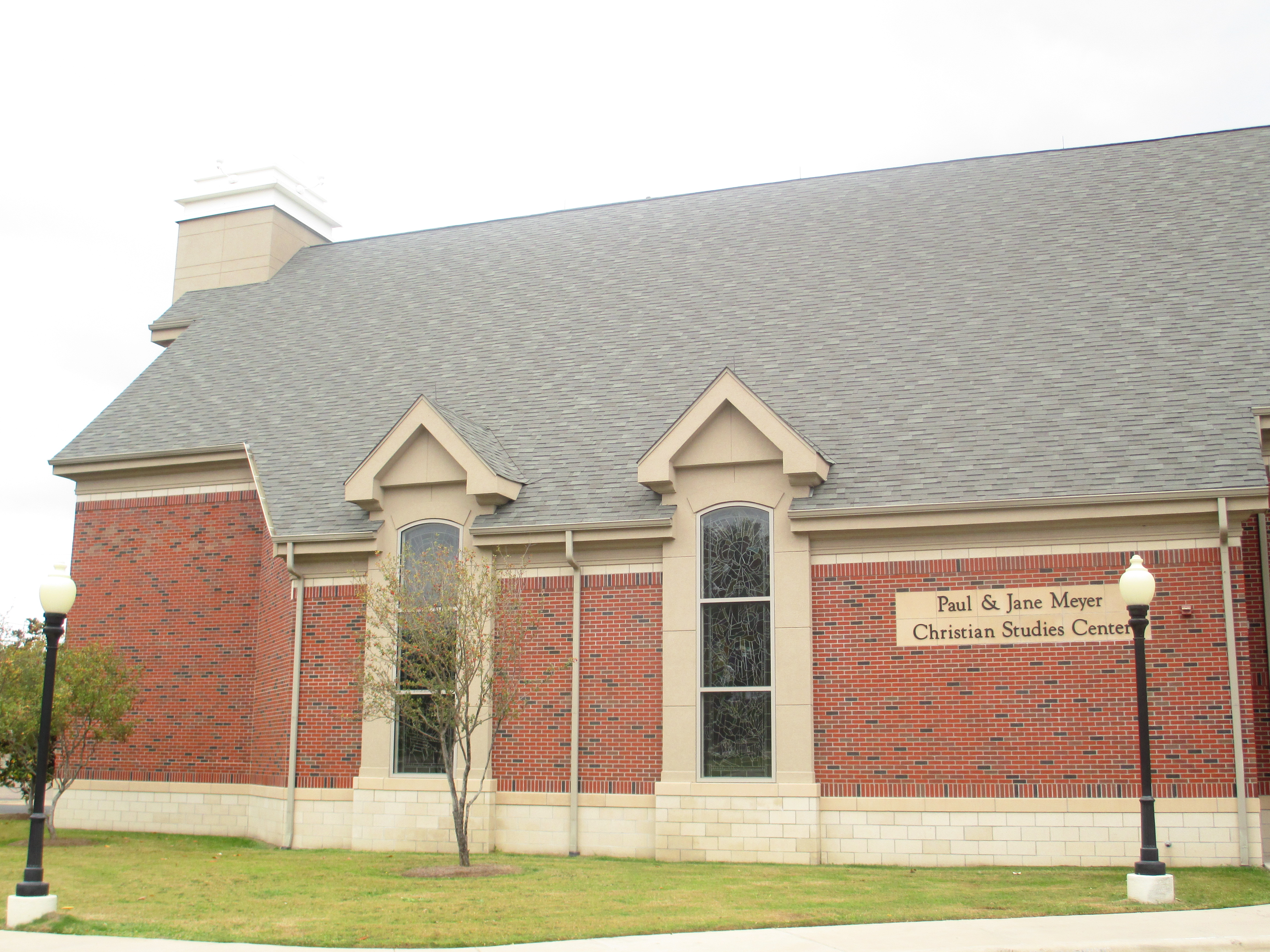
Paul and Jane Meyer Christian Studies Center

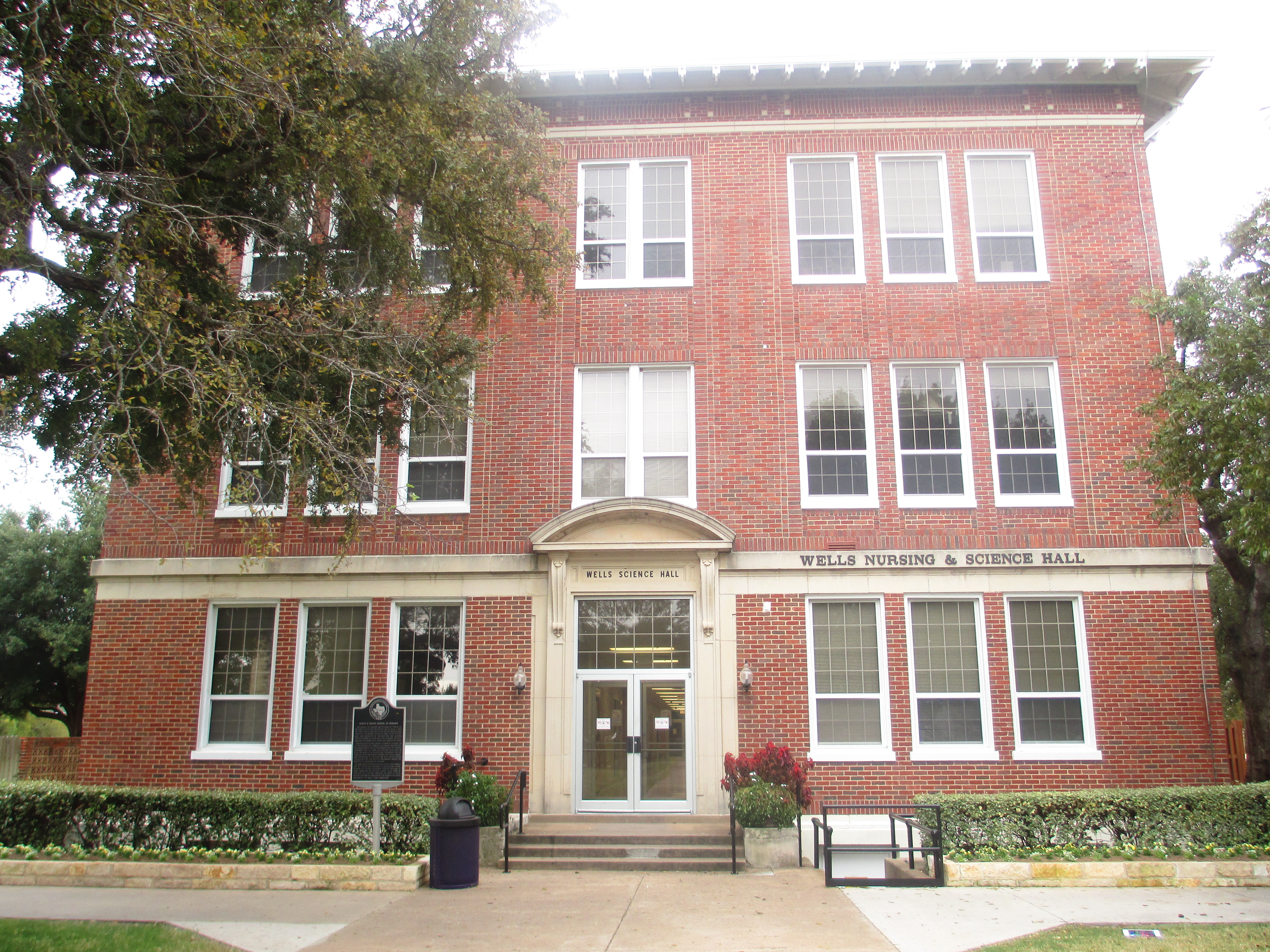
Wells Nursing and Science Hall

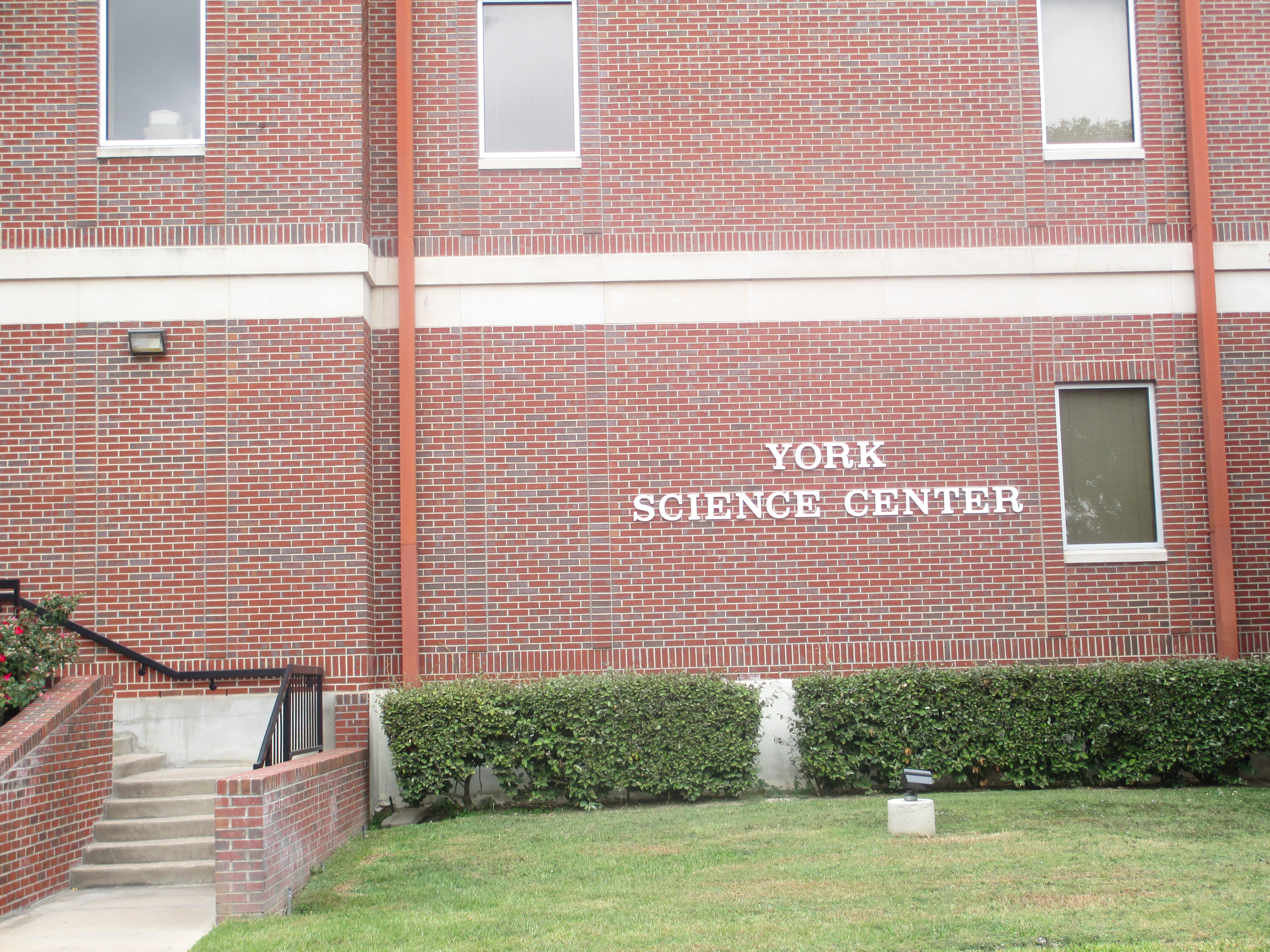
York Science Center

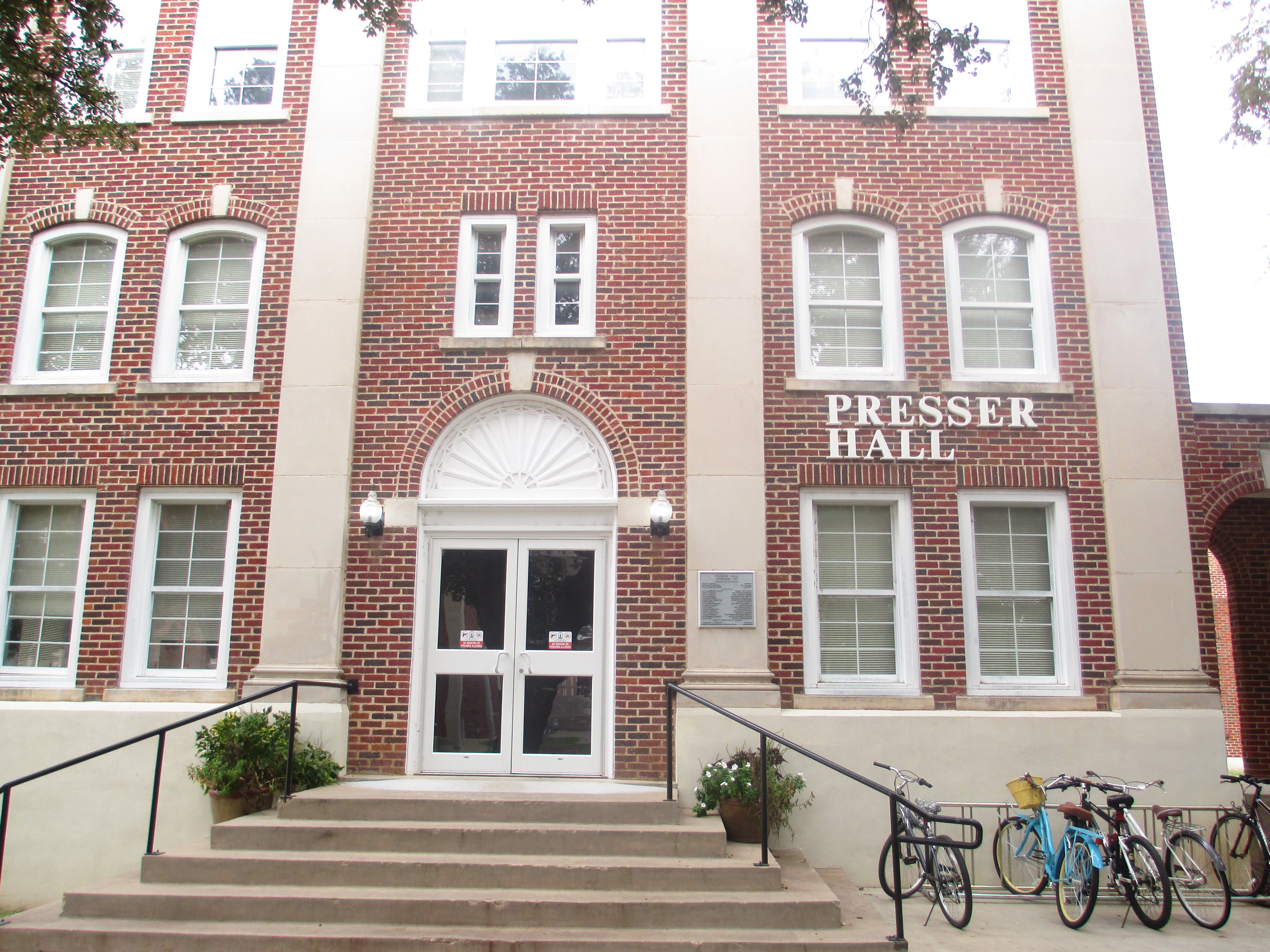
Presser Hall (established 1929) houses the university music department and the Hughes Recital Hall.

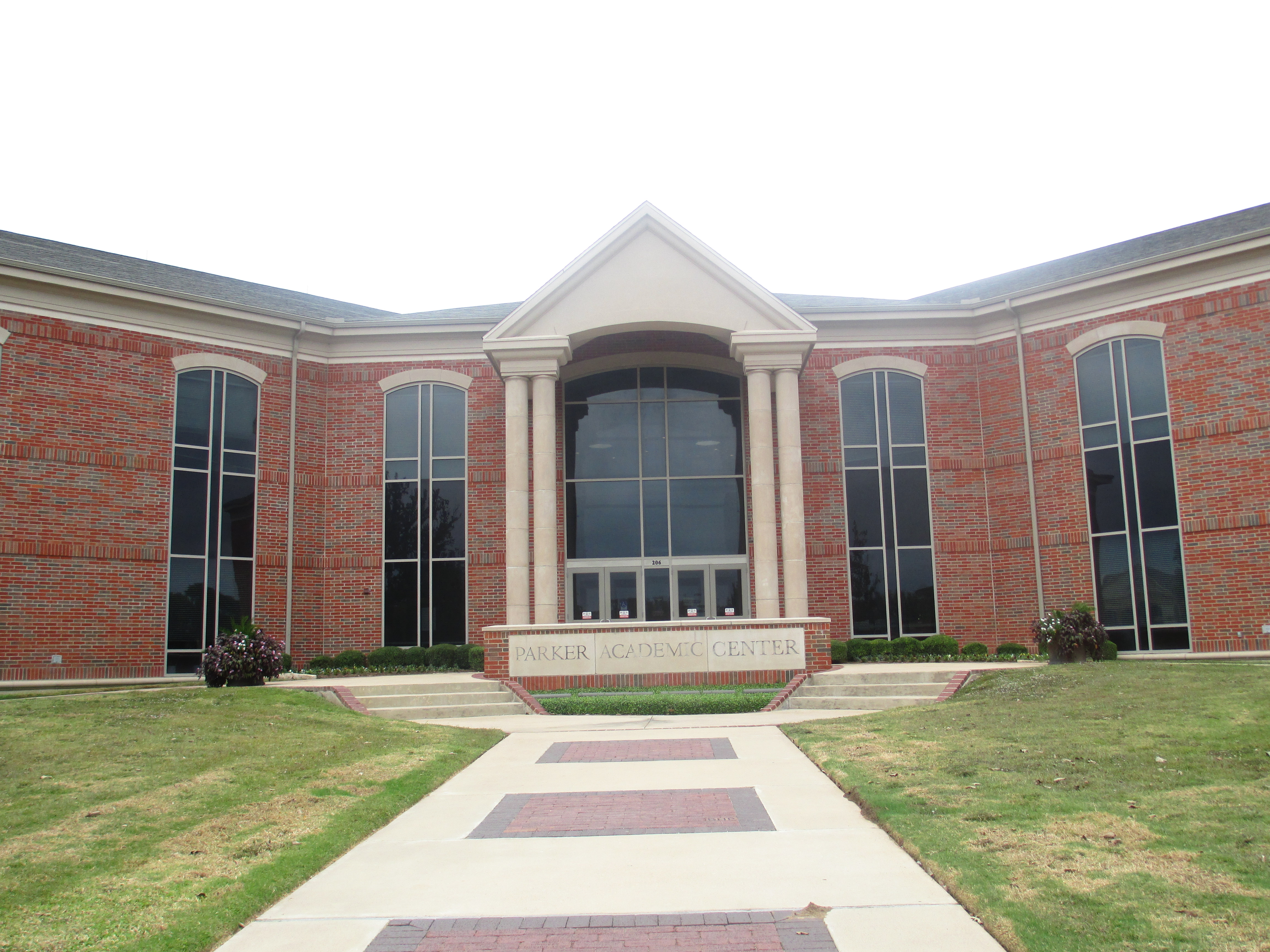
The Parker Academic Center at UMHB opened in 2002

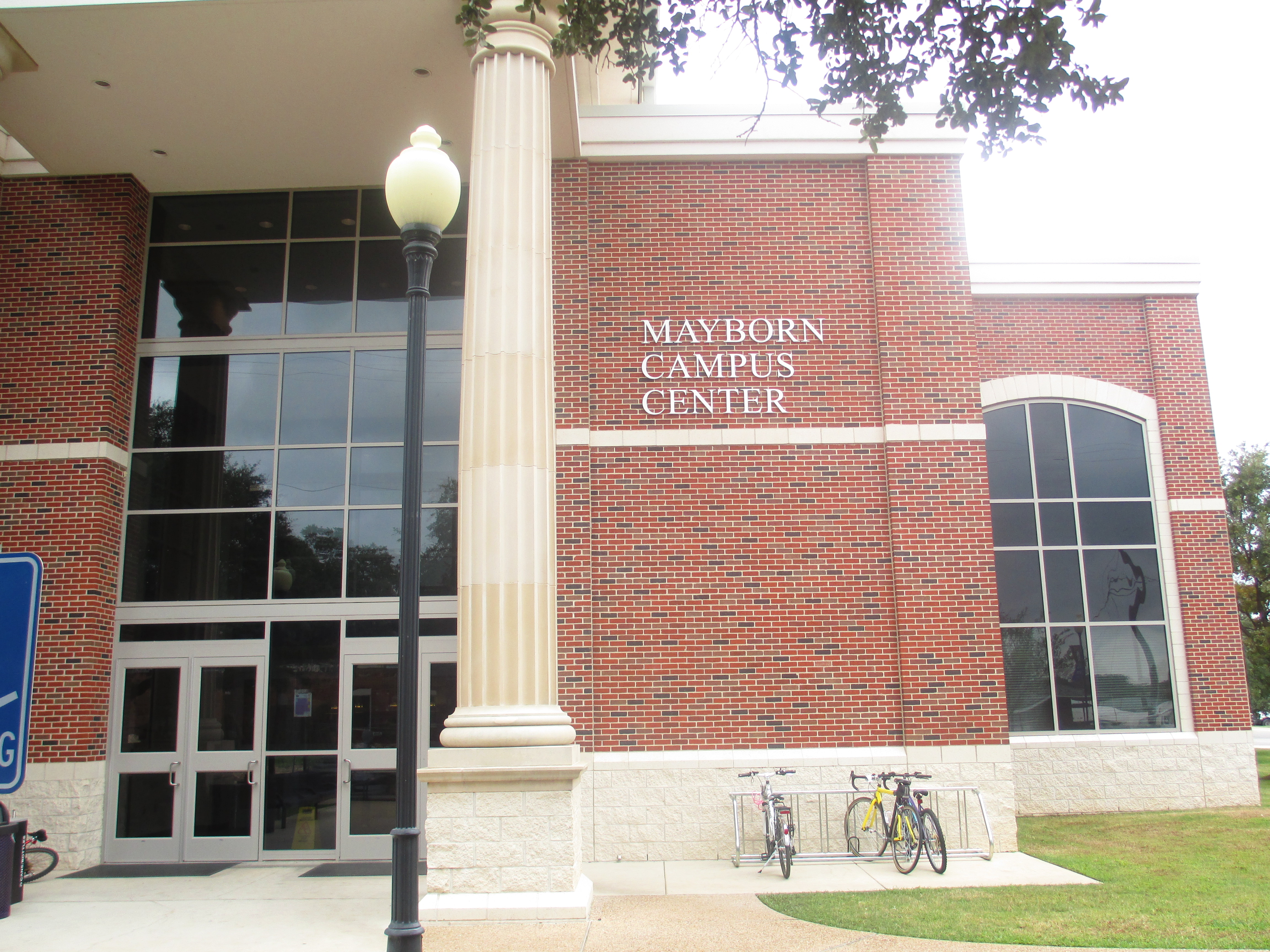
The Mayborn Campus Center is named for its benefactor, the late Temple Daily Telegram publisher, Frank Mayborn
