= Katie Sherrod =

American journalist

- Born: St. Louis, Missouri, U.S.
- Education: University of Houston
- Occupation: Journalist

Katie Sherrod is an American journalist who was inducted into the Texas Women's Hall of Fame in 1987. In 1991, she was fired from the Fort Worth Star-Telegram over accusations of plagiarism.

== Biography ==
Sherrod was born in St. Louis, the third of four children. Her family moved out Iraan, Texas, where her father was employed as the only physician/surgeon in town, his wife Judy a nurse. Katie was educated at Incarnate Word in San Antonio. Sherrod went to college at the University of Houston, graduating in three years. After graduating, she was hired by the Fort Worth Star-Telegram. She became the first woman to write an opinion column at the newspaper, and that column soon became the most popular one in the paper. In 1972, her stories on rape led to the establishment of the rape crisis center in Texas. Several other of her stories provided the basis of a 1978 movie, Battered, and led to Women's Haven, a United Way Worldwide sponsored organization, being founded. Sherrod later became metropolitan editor at the Texas Star. She has received a National Endowment for the Humanities fellowship to Princeton University, and has twice won the Chrysalis Award of the Texas Women's Political Caucus and was named 1986 Woman of the Year by the caucus.

In 1991, over accusations of plagiarism, Sherrod was fired from the Star-Telegram. The action was taken due to a "substantial duplication between a column written by Katie Sherrod in June of 1991 and a feature story written by William Booth of The Washington Post in December of 1990. ... There's not any question in our minds that we have an exact match, or a very close match."

Sherrod currently serves as communications director for the Episcopal Diocese of Fort Worth.
