= Trinidad Mendenhall =

American businesswoman

Trinidad "Trini" Mendenhall is a Texas businesswoman and the recipient of the 2004 Texas Women's Hall of Fame award. Together with her husband she co-founded Fiesta Mart, Inc. in 1972, a 45-store retail grocery chain across Texas. She is the president of Fulton Shopping Center, a real estate investment company in Houston and is the vice president of First Quality Fruit & Produce Company.

== Board memberships ==
Mendenhall is on the board of Catholic charities. In 2004 she was appointed by Governor Rick Perry to the Advisory Board of the Economic Development Stakeholders. She has served on many other boards including those for: Ronald McDonald House, Baylor College of Medicine, University of St. Thomas, Houston Ballet Public Affairs Committee, Alexis de Tocqueville Society, End Hunger Network and more.

== Philanthropy ==
in 1997, she created the Trini and O.C. Mendenhall Foundation, which works to empower women, minorities and children. In 2002, she created the Mendenhall Asthma Research Laboratory at Baylor's Biology of Inflammation Center in memory of her late husband. She is a trustee at the Baylor College of Medicine and serves on the board of trustees of the Houston Ballet.

== Recognition ==
Mendenhall received the Gaia Award by the Susan G. Komen Breast Cancer Foundation and the Woman of Distinction Award by the ABC Channel 13/Crohn's and Colitis Foundation of America. She is a recipient of the Willie Velasquez Hispanic Excellence Award and was named one of Houston's 2000 Millennium Makers by the Evin Thayer Foundation. The Alliance for Mulitcultural Community Services recognized her as a Star Among Us in 2001. In 2010 she received the Alice Graham Baker Crusader Award. In 2018 she was honored with the Catholic charities Legacy Award.
