= Kate Atkinson Bell =

American educator (1907–2003)

- Born: June 29, 1907
- Died: February 25, 2003 (aged 95)
- Education: Baylor University, University of Houston, University of Chicago

Catherine Atkinson Bell (June 29, 1907 – February 25, 2003) was an American educator.

== Life ==
She was educated at Baylor University, the University of Houston and the University of Chicago.

She taught school for eleven years in the Houston Independent School District and was principal for Port Houston Elementary School for three and a half years. Bell was Assistant Director of Elementary Education for 14 years and Director of Elementary Education for nine years. She also served as Assistant Superintendent for Elementary Schools for Area IV, and as Assistant Superintendent for Basic Skills, K-12.

Bell was a member of the White House conference on Education in 1955 and 1960. She also served as a member of the Board of Examiners on Teacher Education and of the Texas Commission on Science. She was elected president of the Texas State Teachers Association in 1954.

Kate Bell Elementary School was named in her honour. Bell was inducted into the Texas Women's Hall of Fame in 1984.
