= May Owen =

Texas physician

- Born: May 3, 1891 (Note: Stafford writes that Owen was born on May 3, 1891. The Texas State Historical Association gives Owen's birth year as 1892.) near Marlin in Falls County, Texas
- Died: April 12, 1988 (aged 96); Fort Worth, Texas
- Occupations: Physician, pathologist
- Known for: discovering talcum powder used on surgical gloves caused infection and peritoneal scarring

May Owen (May 3, 1891 – April 12, 1988) was an American medical doctor from Texas who discovered that the talcum powder used on surgical gloves caused infection and scar tissue to form on the peritoneum. She was the first woman elected as president of the Texas Society of Pathologists (1945), of the Tarrant County Medical Society (1947), and of the Texas Medical Association (1960). She endowed the second chair of the Texas Tech University School of Medicine and received many awards during her career, including induction into the Texas Women's Hall of Fame, Recognition of Merit from the Texas Medical Association, and receipt of the George T. Caldwell Award from the Texas Society of Pathologists.

== Biography ==
=== Early life ===
May Owen was born on a farm near Marlin in Falls County, Texas on May 3, 1891. In 1912, she enrolled in Texas Christian University and upon graduation in 1917 began working in the medical laboratory of Truman C. Terrell in Fort Worth, Texas. She applied to numerous medical schools but was rejected because they did not accept women, but did gain approval when she applied to the University of Louisville School of Medicine, in Louisville, Kentucky. The 1918 flu pandemic convinced her to pursue a career in pathology and Owen graduated with her degree in 1921. She returned briefly to Fort Worth and after receiving approval to observe autopsies at the Mayo Clinic, she traveled to Rochester, Minnesota. Her observation of a few weeks turned into a job for one year, after which she went to Madison, Wisconsin to study anesthesiology. By 1927, she had returned to Fort Worth and joined both the Tarrant County Medical Society and the State Medical Association of Texas.

=== Career ===
In 1933, Owen accepted a position as a pathologist at Bellevue Hospital Center in New York City, but after a year, she returned to Terrell's lab, where she eventually became chief pathologist for Terrell Laboratories. In 1936, she discovered that the talcum powder used on surgical gloves caused infection and peritoneal scarring. The discovery led to changes in surgical practices and an award of an honorary doctorate for Owen from Texas Christian University. In 1945, she was elected as the first woman president of the Texas Society of Pathologists and two years later, in 1947, she was elected as the first woman president of the Tarrant County Medical Society. In the early 1950s, Owen helped with research of the cattle disease caused by 2-chloronapthalene poisoning and her analysis of diabetes in sheep. The Tarrant County Medical Society honored her with the Gold-Headed Cane Award in 1952 for her research, and she was later recognized by the American Veterinary Medical Association. In 1953 Owen received a Recognition of Merit from the Texas Medical Association (TMA) for an occupational medicine exhibit. In 1958, she was awarded the George T. Caldwell Award from the Texas Society of Pathologists.

In 1960, Owen was elected as the first woman president of the TMA and nine years later, they honored her as only the fifth person and first woman with the Distinguished Service Award. In 1965, Owen sponsored a health fair to raise funds for a health museum, which was subsequently built and named the May Owen Hall of Medical Science in her honor. In 1966, she contributed $300,000 to establish a scholarship trust fund through the TMA for medical students. With the opening of Texas Tech University's School of Medicine, in 1972, Owen donated 20,000 books to its library. and then in 1974, she endowed the first chair of pathology, which was the university's second endowed chair. In 1986, she was inducted into the Texas Women's Hall of Fame and died on April 12, 1988, in Fort Worth, Texas.
