= Lucia Rede Madrid =

American school teacher

- Born: January 8, 1913; Polvo, Texas
- Died: February 23, 2006 (aged 93)
- Occupations: Educator, Librarian

Lucia Rede Madrid (January 8, 1913 – February 23, 2006) was an American school teacher. She established a library in the small border town of Redford, Texas.

The daughter of Eusébio Rede and Antonia Luján, she was born in Polvo, Texas. In 1925, she moved with her family to Marfa. She received a BA and MEd from Sul Ross State University. Madrid taught at schools in Marfa and Redford for 23 years, retiring in 1976. She established a private lending library in 1979, which is now a library and museum. The library includes Lucia's Library Hall of Fame, a collection of portraits of people who were children in Redford and have gone on to successful careers. The library started with just 25 books and, by 1992, its holdings had grown to over 15,000 books.

In 1941, she married Enrique Madrid; the couple had three children. Her husband died in 1991.

Madrid was inducted into the Texas Women's Hall of Fame in 1989. She has also received the President's Volunteer Service Award and the Ronald Reagan Award for Volunteer Excellence.
