= Aaronetta Hamilton Pierce =

African-American arts advocate and civic leader

- Born: Aaronetta Hamilton; 1940s
- Occupations: Arts advocate and civic leader
- Spouse: Joseph Pierce
- Awards: Texas Women's Hall of Fame; 1993 Patron of the arts and museums

Aaronetta Hamilton Pierce (born c. 1943) is an African-American arts advocate and civic leader. She has sat on a number of boards of civic and arts organizations. Her areas of interest have been fighting poverty, improving education opportunities, and promoting the visual and performing arts. She was appointed to the Texas Commission on the Arts in 1985. She founded Premier Artworks with her husband to promote African-American artists and their works.

In 1993, she was inducted to the Texas Women's Hall of Fame. In 2007, she received the USCA Humanitarian Award from the Congress.

== Early life ==
Her mother is Clementine Hamilton of Nashville, Tennessee, and she has a sister, Sylvia Hamilton Thomas.

== Career ==
Hamilton Pierce was a museum docent at the San Antonio Museum of Art. While giving a tour there about 1980, a young African-American girl stated that were no black people represented in the works in the museum, which became a springboard for her role promoting the works of African-Americans. She said that she and her husband realized "We had to elevate this great legacy we cherished — the books and art of African Americans — and help it find its deserved place in American history."

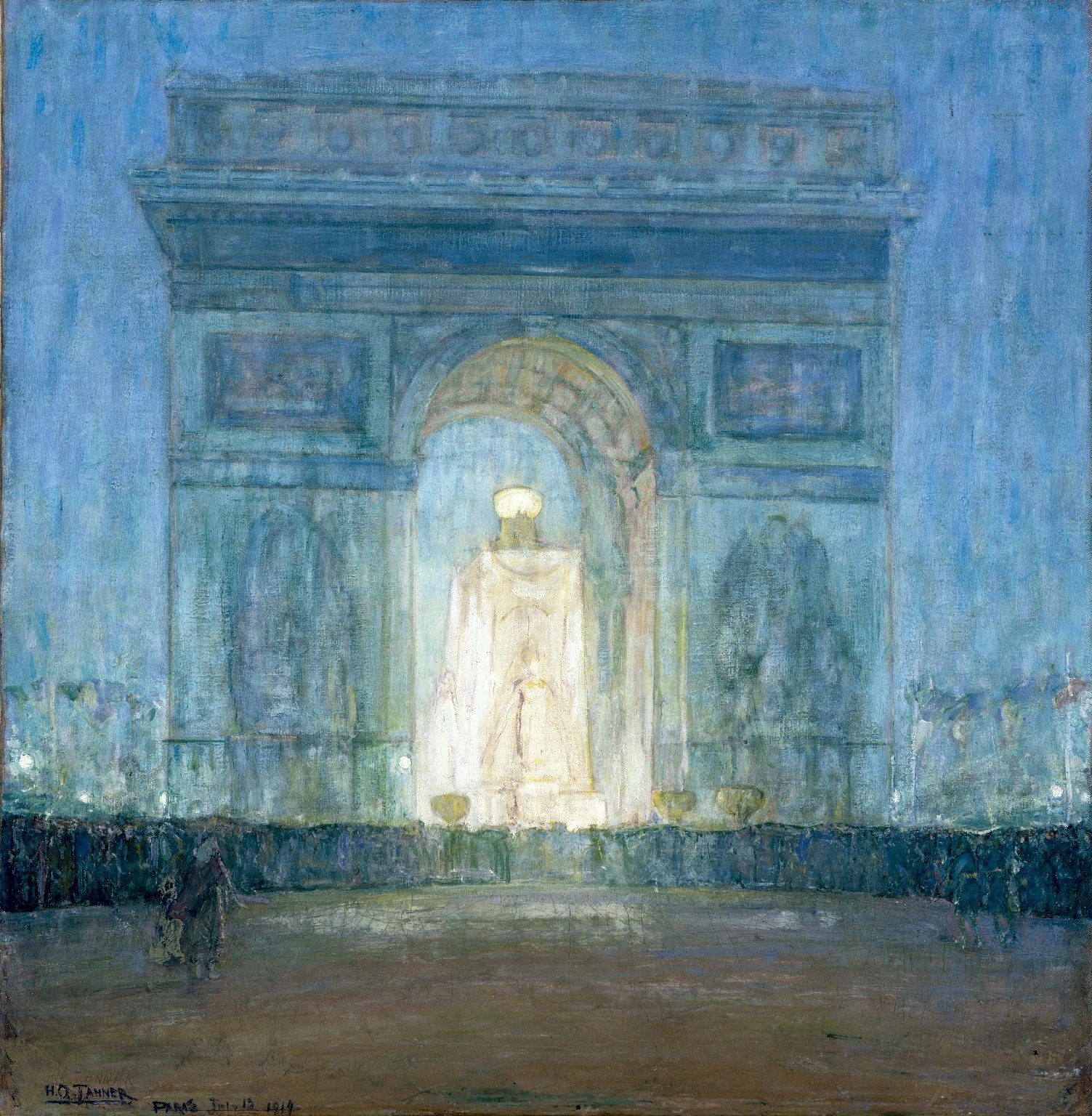
Henry Ossawa Tanner, The Arch, ca. 1915, Brooklyn Museum

Appointed by Governor Mark White in 1985, she was the first African-American woman to sit on the Texas Commission on the Arts in 20 years. She became a San Antonio Museum Association board member and helped bring a show Hidden Heritage: Afro-American Art, 1800-1950 —with the works of Grafton Tyler Brown, Elizabeth Catlett, Jacob Lawrence, and Henry Ossawa Tanner— in 1987. It was the first major show of its kind in San Antonio. That year, she was appointed founding chair for the city's first Martin Luther King Jr. Day celebration by the mayor and her efforts led to the founding of the Department for Culture and Creative Development in San Antonio.

She co-founded the Southwest Ethnic Arts Society and has served on the boards of the San Antonio Performing Arts Association, the Witte Museum, Las Casas Foundation, United Way of San Antonio, and Fisk University. She has served the Rockefeller Foundation's Partnership for Hope to fight poverty and the Education Fund of the Education Partnership. She has also served on the boards of the Texas Cultural Trust, San Antonio Spurs Foundation, San Antonio Library Foundation and the University of Texas at San Antonio Development Board.

Director of Arts Linkage that promotes literary, performing and visual arts, she has said the organization's goal is to enrich the appreciation of African-American artists and the creative genius of their legacy." She sat on the executive committee of the international women's service organization, Links Incorporated. She and her husband founded, and she is president of, Premier Artworks, Inc., which promoted African-American art in private and public collections and exhibits. She was inducted into the San Antonio Women's Hall of Fame in 1984 and the Texas Women's Hall of Fame and honored at the Governor's Ball in 1993. For her role as president of Premier Artworks and her efforts to promote multi-cultural arts and education, she received the USCA Humanitarian Award from the Congress in 2007.

== Personal life ==
Hamilton Pierce is married to Joe Pierce, a retired anesthesiologist. Their sons are Michael and Joey.
