= Carolyn Peterson =

American architect

Carolyn Peterson is a Texas preservation architect.

Born Carolyn Safar, she was educated at Victoria College and the University of Texas at Austin. In 1964, Peterson joined the San Antonio architectural firm now known as Ford, Powell & Carson; she became a partner in 1979. She has designed restorations for the Spanish missions in San Antonio.

In 1979, she was awarded a contract to preserve the historical significance of the Alamo Mission. She has restored several county courthouses in Texas and the Texas State Capitol, as well as buildings in the Strand Historic District of Galveston.

== Personal life ==
In 1963, she married Jack Peterson, also an architect.

== Honors ==
Peterson was named a Fellow in the American Institute of Architects in 1991.

She has received the:

- Fundadores de Misiones medal from the Roman Catholic Archdiocese of San Antonio
- Imagineers Award from the Mind Science Foundation
- Texas Historical Commission Award for Preservation of Historic Architecture

In 2008, she was inducted into the Texas Women's Hall of Fame. In 2009, she received the Medal for Lifetime Achievement in Honor of Llewellyn W. Pitts from the Texas Society of Architects.
