= Dian Graves Stai =

American businesswoman and philanthropist

Dian Graves Stai (born 1940) is an American businesswoman and philanthropist. She is a co-founder of Owen Healthcare, Inc. with her first husband Jean H. Owen. Graves Stai was inducted into the Texas Women's Hall of Fame in 1996.

== Early life and education ==
Graves Stai was born in Abilene, Texas in 1940. She was educated at the Texas Institute of Technology and McMurry University.

== Career ==
In 1965, Graves Stai was a single mother living in Abilene. She married Jean H. Owen in 1969 and together they co-founded the company Owen Healthcare, Inc. She also held roles as secretary and bookkeeper for an oil company and contractor for hospital pharmacies.

After her husband died in a plane crash, she took over the company as chairman in 1979. When she took over the company, it was in financial trouble and family members encouraged her to sell it. Graves Stai refused and she ended the year by signing new contracts with 22 new hospitals.

Graves Stai also sat as Director of the Texas Department of Commerce from 1987 until 1991. In 1997, Graves Stai led a company merge with Cardinal Healthcare and she created Mansefeldt Investment Corporation and the Dian Graves Owen Foundation. She was also inducted into the Texas Women's Hall of Fame and named Outstanding Citizen of the Year by the Abilene Chamber of Commerce. In 2005, her work was recognized by the United Way of Abilene Board of Directors by honouring her with the 2005 Volunteer Service Award.

Graves Stai stayed in her role as Chairwoman of the Dian Graves Owen Foundation for 19 years, before retiring in 2012. In 2016, she was inducted into the Texas Business Hall of Fame.
