= Ruby Lee Piester =

American social worker and advocate

Ruby Lee Piester (August 29, 1915 Hurst, Texas – February 2, 2003 Fort Worth, Texas) was an American social worker and advocate for adoption rights.

== Early life ==
Piester graduated from the University of Texas at Austin with a master's degree in social work.

== Career ==
Piester began to work for the Gladney Center for Adoption in 1961, serving as director of social services. in 1963, she became the executive director of the Gladney Center for Adoption. She increased the renown of the center and expanded its services by establishing education programs for the mothers at the Center, including an on-campus school. She would go on to maintain the executive director position for twenty years, and is estimated to have supervised over 7,800 adoptions. Piester also In 1980, Piester co-founded the National Council for Adoption, which was the first national council to be devoted to adoption issues. The National Council for Adoption advocates for ethical adoption policies and adoption services, and focuses on both domestic and national adoptions. In 1980, she helped introduce the Adoption Act in Texas. The act was designed to protect the rights of confidentiality for the birth mothers of adopted children. Additionally, she served on numerous state-level committees about adoption in her home state of Texas. In 1983, the Ruby Lee Piester Centennial Professorship in Services to Children and Families was established at her alma mater, The University of Texas at Austin, to honor her service and the services of others after her. She was inducted into the Texas Women's Hall of Fame in 1986.

== Books ==
- For the love of a child: The Gladney story - 100 years of adoption in America (1987)
