= Mary Meyers Rosenfield =

American community leader

- Born: Mary Meyers; June 1, 1910; Tsarist Russia
- Died: April 16, 2006 (aged 95)
- Occupations: Community leader, activist
- Spouse: George Rosenfield (m. 1937)
- Children: 2

Mary Meyers Rosenfield (June 1, 1910 — April 16, 2006) was an American community leader, active in special education and services for people with developmental disabilities in Texas.

== Early life and education ==
Mary Meyers was born into a Jewish family in Russia and arrived in the United States as an infant with her family in 1911. In 1912, the Meyers family settled in Texas. She remembered helping to knit blankets as a child during World War I, and volunteering at the town's library when it opened in the 1920s. She was recognized as a founding member of the Wharton chapter of Hadassah, having attended the chapter's first meeting at age 6.

She graduated from high school in 1929 and studied art and design at the College of Industrial Arts (now Texas Woman's University) in Denton, Texas.

== Career ==
Mary Meyers Rosenfield and Alva Spellman founded an independent school for children with developmental disabilities in El Campo, Texas in 1950. She successfully lobbied the local school district to hire its first special educator. In 1952, she added an "Opportunity Center" for young adults with intellectual disabilities, and soon after, a summer camp for disabled children. In 1968, the residential Richmond State School opened with her efforts, to provide therapies and activities for adults with developmental disabilities. "I did it because it needed to be done," she explained late in life.

Rosenfield was the founding president of the El Campo chapter of ARC, and was on the organization's state board. She was named Citizen of the Year by the El Campo Chamber of Commerce in 2004, the same year she was inducted into the Texas Women's Hall of Fame. Governor Rick Perry named her a recipient of the Yellow Rose Award.

== Personal life ==
Mary Meyers married George Rosenfield, a businessman, in 1937. They had two daughters. Their younger daughter Rita Sue was born with developmental disabilities, and lived at Richmond State School as an adult, beginning in 1970.

Rosenfield was active in her community beyond disability-related projects, serving as president of the Ladies' Auxiliary at the American Legion, as a Girl Scout leader, and as a member of the El Campo Garden Club.

Rosenfield was widowed in 1990, and died in 2006, age 95. Her gravesite is in the Shearith Israel cemetery in Wharton. A resolution marking her lifetime achievements was introduced into the Texas House of Representatives after her death.
