= Sybil B. Harrington =

American philanthropist (1908–1998)

Sybil Buckingham Harrington (1908–1998) was an American philanthropist. She was inducted into the Texas Women's Hall of Fame.

== Biography ==
Harrington was born in 1908 in Amarillo, daughter of Frank Buckingham, and to grandparent J.E. Hughes. On October 5, 1924 she married Edwin Ray Reeder at the First Baptist Church in Canyon, TX. She was a Junior at Amarillo High at the time. Her first marriage ended two years later. In 1935, she married Donald D. Harrington, a successful oil worker. In 1951, the couple created the Don and Sybil Harrington Foundation, which would grow to have more than $73 million in assets. Harrington extensively donated money to areas around and on the Texas Panhandle, including the musical developed by the Panhandle-Plains Historical Museum, Texas.

Harrington was a prominent benefactor of the New York Metropolitan Opera, underwriting 16 productions, two gala concerts, and 13 “Metropolitan Presents” telecasts. In her lifetime, she donated over $30 million to the Opera. The first gift she made was in funding Verdi's Don Carlos. Harrington would later fund Franco Zeffirelli's La bohème, Tosca and Turandot, Otto Schenk's Meistersinger, Elijah Moshinsky's production of Verdi's Otello, Puccini's Manon Lescaut, Johann Strauss's Fledermaus, Wagner's Rheingold and Mozart's Don Giovanni. She became a member of the Metropolitan Opera Association in 1968. Two years later, she became a director of its managing board, and then eight years following an advisory director.

Her house, the Harrington House, is a 15,000-square-foot mansion that is listed on the National Register of Historic Places. Harrington was awarded Woman of the Year from the Amarillo News-Globe, a Doctor of Letters from Texas Tech University School of Medicine, from West Texas A&M University, an Honorary Doctor of Philosophy Humanitarian Award, Women's Distinguished Service, the American Institute of Architects named her an honorary member of Texas Society of Architects, and from the Academy of Television Arts and Science, Outstanding Classical Program in the Performing Arts.

Harrington also established the Sybil B. Harrington Living Trust in 1987 to fund educational and other entities. It is separate from the foundation.
