= Lavinia Masters =

American activist

Lavinia B. Masters
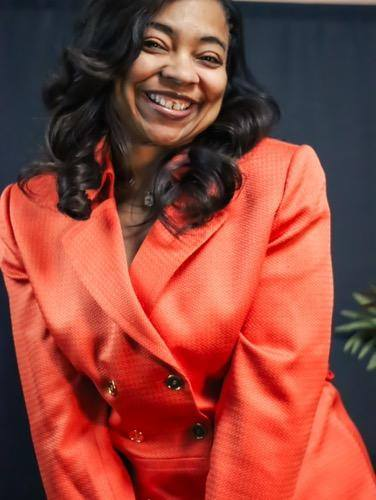
- Masters in Fort Bliss
- Born: Waco, Texas
- Occupation(s): Activist, author, life coach
- Known for: Sexual assault survivor advocacy
- Spouse: Ricky Lee Masters
- Children: 1
- Website: laviniamasters.com

Lavinia Masters is an American advocate for survivors of sexual assault and rape. She is the namesake of the Lavinia Masters Act, passed in Texas in 2019. She was named to the Texas Women's Hall of Fame in 2023.

== Early life ==
Masters was raised in West Dallas, Texas. She describes her childhood as being raised in a "religious or faith-based household".

In 1985, Masters was raped at the age of 13. The assailant broke into her family's home and assaulted her at gunpoint. Masters described the investigation done by the local police as dehumanizing, saying that it "devastated me more than the rape".

== Aftermath and advocacy ==
Masters' rape kit went untested for over 20 years, until 2005. In 2004, Congress passed the Debbie Smith Act, which provided funding for police to work off backlogs of unexamined rape kits like Masters. Her case was reopened, and DNA testing matched a serial rapist, but at that time the two (2) statute of limitations allotted had already expired. Masters reported feeling "devastated", and turned towards becoming an advocate for survivors of sexual assault.

After contacting her local city council, Masters started working with Texas House representative Victoria Neave. In 2018, Neave assembled a Dallas task force to "identify issues with the way the legal system handles sexual assault and harassment". In 2019, the Lavinia Masters Act was signed into law with bipartisan support. The law requires that all rape kits in Texas must be tested within 90 days.

In addition to advocacy, Masters works as a consultant, trainer, and life coach. Since 2019, Masters has been a member of the Sexual Assault Survivors’ Task Force in Texas. She also works to educate people in rural Texas about their rights under the new law.

== Awards and honors ==
- In 2019, Masters received The George H.W. Bush Points of Light Award
- In 2019, Masters received The Family Place Texas Trailblazer Awards
- In 2020, Masters received The OVC Crime Victims' "Special Courage Award" from the Justice Department
- In 2023, Masters was inducted into Texas Women's Hall of Fame in recognition of her "selflessness and strength"
