= Judy Castle Scott =

Blind advocate and activist in the field of vision loss

Judy Castle Scott is an advocate and activist known for her work to improve the living conditions of the visually impaired. Blind herself, she worked for several public and private organizations dedicated to the cause, and served as the director of the American Foundation for the Blind, retiring in 2015. Over the course of her career, Scott has been the recipient of various accolades, including being inducted into the Texas Women's Hall of Fame.

== Early life and education ==
Scott lived with her family on a farm near Pickton, Texas and has been blind since childhood. She holds a bachelor's in psychology and sociology and master's in counseling and guidance/aging from Texas A&M University–Commerce (which was formerly East Texas State University).

== Career and advocacy ==
In the 1970s, Scott worked for the Texas Commission for the Blind, working to establish an Independent Living Program for elderly Texans with vision loss. This program is credited with helping to establish a national program through federal legislation.

In 1981, Scott joined the American Foundation for the Blind (AFB), working to establish the National Agenda on Aging and Vision Loss, an initiative to raise awareness of the effects of vision loss in older Americans. Scott also focused on increasing federal funding for similar programs to assist the visually impaired geriatric population. In 1996, Scott joined the Texas Governor's Committee on People with Disabilities.

Scott has helped to make multiple public structures more accessible to disabled individuals, including the American Airlines Center, Cowboys Stadium, and Terminal D of the Dallas/Fort Worth International Airport. Scott was previously president of the Texas Association for Education and Rehabilitation of the Blind and Visually Impaired.

== Recognition ==
In 1996, George W. Bush appointed Scott to the Governor's Committee on People with Disabilities. She was later promoted to committee chair by Governor Rick Perry in 2007.

In 2010, Scott was inducted into the Texas Women's Hall of Fame.

In 2017, Scott was awarded the American Council of the Blind President's Impact Award.
