= L. Ruth Guy =

American educator and pathologist

- Born: March 17, 1913
- Died: May 3, 2006 (aged 93); Dallas
- Awards: Texas Women's Hall of Fame

L. Ruth Guy (March 17, 1913 – May 3, 2006) was an American educator and pathologist. She was inducted into the Texas Women's Hall of Fame in 1989.

== Life ==
Born in Kemp, she received a bachelor's degree from Baylor University in 1934. She continued her studies in medical technology at Baylor University Hospital in Dallas. From 1939 to 1946, she worked as a medical technologist at Hendrick Memorial Hospital in Abilene. She returned to Baylor University to earn a master's degree in 1949. While completing her degree, she worked at the William Buchanan Blood Bank and attended the organizing meeting for the American Association of Blood Banks held in 1947. In 1953, she earned a PhD from Stanford University. She then returned to Dallas and, with E.E. Muirhead, founded the University of Texas School of Medical Technology. In the late 1950s, at Parkland Memorial Hospital, she helped develop a rape kit for collecting evidence following sexual assaults. In 1969, Guy was named the first chair of the Medical Technology department. A program for specialists in blood bank technology was established soon afterwards. Guy was president of the South Central Association of Blood Banks from 1964 to 1965. She was professor emeritus in the pathology department at the University of Texas Southwestern Medical School.

Guy was an honorary fellow of the American Society of Clinical Pathologists. In 1973, she received the John Elliot Award from the American Association of Blood Banks.

She died at the Presbyterian Hospital in Dallas at the age of 93.
