= Eleanor Anne Young =

American physician

- Born: November 8, 1925; Houston
- Died: July 13, 2007 (aged 81); San Antonio
- Education: Incarnate Word College, St. Louis University, University of Wisconsin
- Awards: Texas Women's Hall of Fame
- Scientific career
- Fields: Medicine
- Workplaces: Incarnate Word College, University of Texas Health Science Center

Eleanor Anne Young (October 8, 1925 – July 13, 2007) was a Catholic religious sister, research scientist, and educator. She was inducted into the Texas Women's Hall of Fame in 1994.

== Biography ==
The daughter of Carl Young and Eleanor Hamilton, she was born in Houston. Young joined the Sisters of Charity of the Incarnate Word in 1946. She received a bachelor's degree in biology and chemistry (1947) from Incarnate Word College, a master's in nutrition education (1955) from St. Louis University and a PhD in nutrition, biochemistry and physiology (1968) from the University of Wisconsin. She was an associate professor at Incarnate Word College and then a professor in medicine at the University of Texas Health Science Center. Young often asked her students to eat the same food as was being served to patients to help them appreciate the patient's viewpoint. She also served on the staff at the Health Center Hospital as an associate consulting member and as a consultant in nutrition at the Audie L. Murphy Memorial VA Hospital.

Young led the first studies to show a hereditary lactase deficiency in Hispanic people. The nutrition curriculum that she established at the University of Texas Health Science Center was hailed by the National Academy of Sciences as a model for this type of program.

In 1982, she was named Texas Dietician of the Year. In 1991, she was named a fellow of the American Institute of Nutrition.

She died at the Incarnate Word Retirement Community in San Antonio. Young donated her body to science.
