= Dealey Decherd Herndon =

Dealey Decherd Herndon (born January 10, 1947) is a historic preservationist in Texas. She was inducted into the Texas Women's Hall of Fame in 2000.

The daughter of H. Benjamin Decherd Jr., she was born Dealey Decherd. Her brother Robert is a retired media business owner. Herndon is a graduate of the University of Texas.

She was executive director of the Texas State Preservation Board from 1991 to 1995. From 1995 to 2006, she was president of the project management and construction management firm Herndon, Stauch & Associates which oversaw s number of restoration projects including the George W. Bush Childhood Home and the Caldwell County Historic Courthouse. She was project coordinator for the Texas State History Museum. She was awarded the Texas Medal of Arts in 2003. She served as president of the Heritage Society of Austin and of the Texas State History Museum Foundation. Herndon was also president of the board of directors of the Friends of the Governor’s Mansion and chair of the board of trustees for St. Edward's University. She has served on the board of directors of A. H. Belo Corporation since 2007.
