= Mary Lavinia Griffith =

American rancher and conservationist

- Born: June 25, 1906; Terrell, Texas
- Died: October 13, 1993 (aged 87); Austin, Texas
- Occupation: rancher
- Spouse: Benjamin Bonaparte Sanders (m. 1930)
- Children: Sylvia Sanders
- Family: William Clark Jr.

Mary Lavinia Griffith (June 25, 1906 – October 13, 1993) was an American rancher and conservationist.

== Biography ==
Mary Lavinia Griffith was born on June 25, 1906, in Terrell, Texas. She is a descendant of William Clark Jr., a signer of the Texas Declaration of Independence. Griffith married Benjamin Bonaparte Sanders on January 15, 1930. They had one child, Sylvia Sanders, born in 1937.

Griffith was vice president and assistant legislative chair of the League of Women Voters from 1949 to 1952.

Griffith owned and operated Griffith League Ranch, where she was one of the first Texas ranchers to crossbreed cattle. The land was part of a land grant given by Sam Houston to supporters of the Texas Revolution. It supports the westernmost stand of Loblolly pine in the United States and is federally designated habitat for the Houston Toad, an endangered species. In 1963, Griffith donated land in Nacogdoches, Texas, for a park.

Griffith was inducted into the Texas Women's Hall of Fame in 1986.

Griffith died on October 13, 1993, in Austin, Texas. She bequeathed Griffith League Ranch to the Boy Scouts of America, requesting that the property be preserved “in its entirety, substantially as it presently exists” so that “leaders might come from the hubbub of urban life to the serenity of the ranch for inspiration and learning, and to that end some sort of conference center might be built within the ranch”. She further stipulated that “The Property shall be used as a memorial park in memory of the creators of the Republic of Texas, being those men who signed the Texas Declaration of Independence.” In 2015, the Boy Scouts sold the ranch's exclusive water rights to the Lower Colorado River Authority.
