= Amy Freeman Lee =

American artist, writer and lecturer

- Born: October 3, 1914; San Antonio, Texas, U.S.
- Died: July 20, 2004 (aged 89); San Antonio, Texas, U.S.
- Education: Saint Mary's Hall; University of Texas at Austin; Incarnate Word College
- Occupations: Artist; writer
- Spouse: Ernest Lee

Amy Freeman Lee (October 3, 1914 – July 20, 2004) was an American artist, writer and lecturer. She was inducted into the Texas Women's Hall of Fame in 1984.

== Biography ==
The daughter of Julia Freeman and Joe Novich, she was born in San Antonio and, after her mother died in 1918, was legally adopted and raised by her grandmother Emma Freeman in Seguin. She attended Saint Mary's Hall boarding school and went on to further studies at the University of Texas at Austin and Incarnate Word College.

Lee served as president of the board of trustees of the University of the Incarnate Word from 1973 to 1990. From 1976 to 2004, she was chairman of the board of Wilhelm Schole International.

Between 1948 and 1992, she gave nearly 2500 lectures to various organizations.

She was a founder of the San Antonio Symphony and of the San Antonio Art League. Lee was founder and president of the Texas Watercolor Society. Between 1947 and 1989, she had 149 solo exhibitions of her art and her work was included in 639 group exhibitions held between 1945 and 1992. Her work is included in public and private collections, including those of the McNay Art Museum, Baylor University, Prairie View A&M University, the Chrysler Museum of Art and Smith College.

She was art critic for the San Antonio Express from 1939 to 1941 and for KONO radio from 1942 to 1950. She was elected as a member of the International Association of Art Critics in 1952, as well as becoming a member of the American section of the same association in 1977.

Lee received the Maury Maverick Award from the American Civil Liberties Union and the Joseph Wood Krutch Award from the American Humane Society. In 1985, CBS produced a documentary on her life Reality is Becoming. She also received the Lifetime Achievement Award from the Ford Motor Company, the J.C. Penney Spirit of the American Woman and the Women Who Make a Difference Award from the International Women's Forum.

== Personal life ==
Lee's husband was Ernest Lee, but she was separated after three years.

On July 20, 2004, Lee died in San Antonio, Texas at the age of 89.

== Selected works ==
- Remember Pearl Harbor (1943)
- Ipso Facto (1976)
- Inkwell Echos (1985)
- Parnassus of World Poetry (1994)
