= Margaret Swan Forbes =

American swimmer

Personal information
- Born: 1919 San Antonio
- Died: December 18, 2010 (aged 90–91) San Antonio
- Height: 5 ft 6 in (168 cm)

Sport
- Sport: Swimming

Margaret Swan Forbes (1919–2010) was an American swimmer.

== Life and career ==
Forbes was born in San Antonio, Texas in 1919. She attended Trinity University, where she earned bachelor's and master's degrees in physical education.

During her career, she taught swimming at the San Antonio College; her students include Olympians such as Josh Davis. She also served as a secretary and chairwoman of the Synchronized Swimming International, Olympic Committee.

In 1973, she was named as the Sportswoman of the Year for the San Antonio Express-News.

In 1984, she published Coaching Synchronized Swimming Effectively; it was the first official teaching manual for synchronized swimming.

In 2001, she became an emeritus professor.

Forbes died in 2010.

== Books ==
- Coaching Synchronized Swimming Effectively (1984)
