= International Women's Writing Guild =

Non-profit writing organization

The International Women's Writing Guild (IWWG) was founded in 1976 by Hannelore Hahn. It is a 501(c)(3) non-profit writing organization whose mission is to "empower women writers personally and professionally through writing."

== Programs ==
The IWWG organizes regional events throughout the year. Regional volunteers organize round table discussions in their local areas and offer mentoring to other writers. There are also day long retreats that take place around the country. No portfolio or experience is needed for these retreats.

While IWWG accepts members, writers do not need to be a member in order to attend events. The membership does give access to discounts to the events, as well as opportunities to network and sell published work.

The IWWG has been an official Non-Governmental Organization (NGO) with special consultative status at the United Nations Economic and Social Council since 1998.

The IWWG collects an annual membership fee from registered members. It offers workshops in person and online.

== Works ==
- Hahn, Hannelore. Remember the Magic: The Story of the International Women's Writing Guild in celebration of Its 25th Anniversary, in Her Own Words (2001) New York: International Women's Writing Guild. ISBN 9780962016509
