= Eleanor Montague =

American radiologist and educator (1926–2018)

Eleanor D. Montague
- Born: February 11, 1926; Genoa, Italy
- Died: November 9, 2018 (aged 92)
- Citizenship: American
- Education: Woman's Medical College of Pennsylvania
- Known for: pioneering treatments for breast cancer
- Spouse: Meredith Montague III
- Children: 4
- Scientific career
- Fields: Radiation oncology
- Workplaces: University of Texas MD Anderson Cancer Center

Eleanor D. Montague (February 11, 1926 – November 9, 2018) was an American radiologist and educator who established breast-conserving therapy in the United States and improved radiation therapy techniques. She became a member of the Texas Women's Hall of Fame in 1993.

== Early life ==
Montague was born Eleanor Dino in Genoa, Italy, the only child of Frank and Sylvia Dino. Her family moved to Eastern Pennsylvania when she was in elementary school, where she remained until graduating valedictorian of her high school class.

== Career ==
Montague received a bachelor's degree in biology from the University of Alabama and an MD from the Woman's Medical College of Pennsylvania in 1950. She met her husband, Meredith "Monty" Montague III, while working in the emergency room at Kings County Hospital Center; she overheard him saying that he would never marry a woman doctor. They became friends and then were married a few years later. She worked in Japan for two years while her husband was stationed at a MASH unit there.

Montague completed her residency in radiology at Columbia-Presbyterian Medical Center. In 1959, Montague joined the radiotherapy department at the University of Texas MD Anderson Cancer Center under an American Cancer Society fellowship. She was employed at MD Anderson from 1961 to 1983. In 1973, she became a radiotherapy professor. She retired in 1987.

Montague was a pioneer in breast cancer research and treatment. During the 1960s-70s, mastectomy was considered the only cure for breast cancer. Montague instead advocated for lumpectomy, a more moderate surgery, combined with radiation therapy to preserve breast function and appearance for patients with early-stage breast cancer. Following clinical trials and a treatment program that Montague initiated at Anderson, breast-conserving therapy became established practice in the United States. Montague also pioneered new radiation therapy techniques and approaches for patients with advanced breast cancer, paved the way for chemotherapy to become part of a multimodal treatment approach, and criticised the ongoing use of radical mastectomy.

An award in her name, the Eleanor Montague Distinguished Resident Award in Radiation Oncology, was created by the American Association for Women Radiologists.

She was a member of the board of directors for the American Cancer Society of Therapeutic Radiologists and of the executive of the American Radium Society. Montague served on the National Breast Cancer Task Force and with the National Surgical Adjuvant Breast Project.

== Publications ==
Montague was a prolific scholar, publishing more than 100 articles during her career. A partial list of her publications:

- Montague, E. D. (1967). Current cancer concepts. radiation management of advanced breast cancer. JAMA : The Journal of the American Medical Association, 200(7), 612-612. https://doi.org/10.1001/jama.200.7.612
- Tapley, N. D., & Montague, E. D. (1976). Elective irradiation with the electron beam after mastectomy for breast cancer. American Journal of Roentgenology (1976), 126(1), 127.
- Libshitz, H. I., Montague, E. D., & Paulus, D. D. (1977). Calcifications and the therapeutically irradiated breast. American Journal of Roentgenology (1976), 128(6), 1021.
- Libshitz, H. I., Montague, E. D., & Paulus, J., D D. (1978). Skin thickness in the therapeutically irradiated breast. American Journal of Roentgenology (1976), 130(2), 345.
- Montague, E. D., & Fletcher, G. H. (1983). The need for every modality treatment to prevent catastrophic local and regional failures in advanced breast cancer. International Journal of Radiation Oncology, Biology, Physics, 9(3), 419.
- Montague, E. D. (1984). Conservation surgery and radiation therapy in the treatment of operable breast cancer. Cancer, 53(3 Suppl), 700.
- Montague, E. D., Ames, F. C., Schell, S. R., & Romsdahl, M. M. (1984). Conservation surgery and irradiation as an alternative to mastectomy in the treatment of clinically favorable breast cancer. Cancer, 54(11 Suppl), 2668.
- Montague, E. D. (1985). Radiation therapy and breast cancer. past, present, and future. American Journal of Clinical Oncology, 8(6), 455.
- Chen, K. K., Montague, E. D., & Oswald, M. J. (1985). Results of irradiation in the treatment of locoregional breast cancer recurrence. Cancer, 56(6), 1269.
- Matthews, R. H., McNeese, M. D., Montague, E. D., & Oswald, M. J. (1988). Prognostic implications of age in breast cancer patients treated with tumorectomy and irradiation or with mastectomy. International Journal of Radiation Oncology, Biology, Physics, 14(4), 659.

== Awards ==
- Janeway Medal by the American Radium Society in 1985
- Gold Medal of the Radiological Society of North America in 1986
- Marie Curie Recipient by the American Association for Women Radiologists in 1990
- Gold Medal for Distinguished and Extraordinary Service to the American Society for Therapeutic Radiology and Oncology in 1992
- Alumna Award of Achievement by the Medical College of Pennsylvania
- Distinguished Service Award and the Outstanding Achievement Award by the University of Texas MD Anderson Cancer Center
- Gilbert H. Fletcher Society Gold Medal for outstanding achievement in her field
