= Charles Haertling =

American architect

Charles Allan Haertling (October 21, 1928 - April 20, 1984) was an American architect, whose works often combined elements of modernism and organic architecture. He is best known for his distinctive residential projects in and around Boulder and Denver, Colorado.

== Biography ==
Haertling was born in 1928 in Ste. Genevieve, Missouri. After completing high school, he joined the Navy, serving from 1946 to 1948. Following his naval service, Haertling studied at the School of Architecture at Washington University in St. Louis, graduating in 1952 with a bachelor's degree in architecture.

In 1953, Haertling moved to Boulder, Colorado to serve on the architecture faculty of the University of Colorado, a position he would hold until 1955, and again later from 1965-1966. In 1957 he opened his own architectural practice in Boulder, completing his first project, a local residential expansion, the following year. Haertling would eventually design over 40 buildings, primarily residential structures in the Boulder-Denver region, completing his last project in 1983. In 1970, the American Institute of Architects inducted Haertling as a member.

In addition to his architectural career, Haertling was also an active participant in local government and community service. From 1967-1973 he served three terms on Boulder's city council, where he was an advocate for greenbelt preservation, civic improvement projects such as the Pearl Street Mall, and environmental awareness. Between 1970-1971, he acted as Deputy Mayor for the City of Boulder. He also served on several local arts commissions and Lutheran church organizations.

Haertling married Viola Brase, with whom he raised four children. He died of brain cancer in 1984 at age 55. A memorial foundation was created in his name to document and promote the preservation of his work.

== Style and influences ==
Haertling's designs reflect an eclectic mix of different architectural styles and philosophies, incorporating elements of modernism and organic architecture, and drawing inspiration from the Usonian principles of Frank Lloyd Wright and the works of Bruce Goff, among others.

He often experimented with forms found in nature, including leaves (Leaneagh House, 1980), mushrooms and barnacles (Brenton House, 1969), yucca plants (Warburton House, 1963), and other natural shapes. At the same time, he also designed many structures according to more mathematical and geometric themes, as in the examples of the Willard House (1962) and the multifaceted Jourgensen House (1971). For his St. Stephen's Church in Northglenn, Colorado (1964), Haertling employed a tent-like thin-shell roof, evocative of similar curved concrete designs by Oscar Niemeyer.

Haertling often made efforts to harmoniously integrate his buildings with their physical environments. For his strongly Usonian-influenced Menkick House (1970), he incorporated a local rock outcropping into the structure of the home, echoing Frank Lloyd Wright's Fallingwater. He would also occasionally explore motifs inherent to a project's geographical and cultural environment. For his unbuilt Tambor Guest House project in Costa Rica (1973), he based his design upon traditional thatch hut architecture. For another unbuilt project, the waterfront Chart House Restaurant in Mamaroneck, New York (1982), Haertling used forms reminiscent of wood pier pilings, boats and sails in his sketches.

== List of works ==
- 1958: Wheat House, Boulder, Colorado
- 1958: Noble House, Boulder
- 1958: White House, Boulder
- 1960: Knudsen House, Boulder
- 1961: Krueger House, Boulder
- 1961: Willard House, Boulder
- 1961: Quaker Meeting House, Boulder
- 1961: Our Savior Parish Center, Denver, Colorado
- 1963: J.R. Knitting Mill, Boulder
- 1963: Warburton House, Gold Hill, Colorado
- 1964: St. Stephen's Church, Northglenn, Colorado

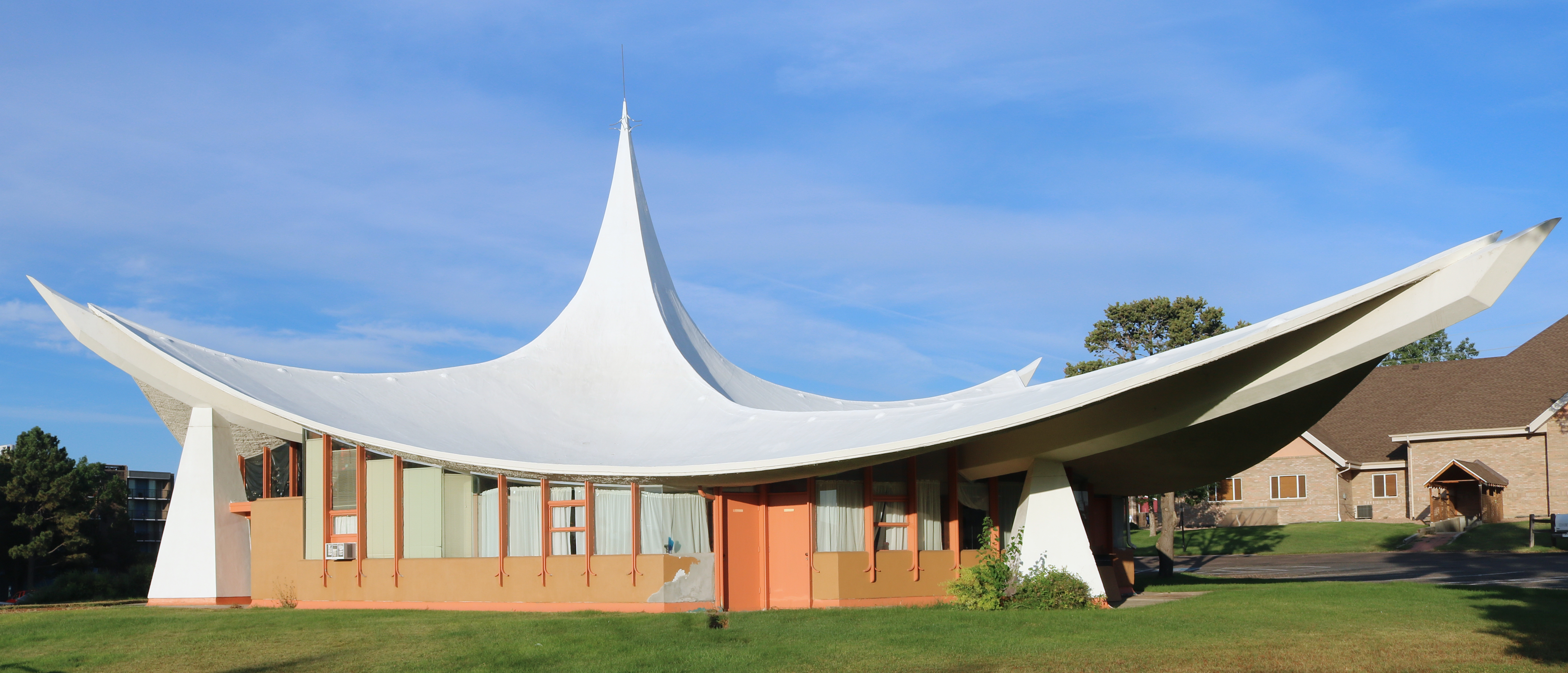
St. Stephen's Lutheran Church in Northglenn, Colorado

- 1964: Volsky House, Boulder
- 1964: Fredrick House, Lakewood
- 1965: Triframe Modular, Denver, Cleveland, Albuquerque
- 1965: Frederick House, Denver
- 1965: Albersheim House, Boulder
- 1966: Moment House, Boulder
- 1966: Fahrenkrog House, Snowmass, Colorado (unbuilt)
- 1966: Dammann I House, Boulder
- 1967: McConnell House, Boulder
- 1967: Conlin House, Boulder
- 1968: Caldwell House, Boulder
- 1968: Smith House, Snowmass
- 1968: Faye-Peterson House, Littleton, Colorado
- 1969: Boulder Eye Clinic, Boulder
- 1969: Brenton House, Boulder
- 1970: Kahn House, Boulder
- 1970: Menkick House, Boulder
- 1970: Steward House, Boulder
- 1970: Evergreen Apartments, Boulder
- 1970: Grace Lutheran Church remodeling, Boulder
- 1970: Davis House, Boulder
- 1970: Razee House, Denver
- 1970: Gill House, Boulder
- 1971: Jourgensen House, Boulder
- 1971: Barrett House, Boulder
- 1971: Stead House, Boulder
- 1971: Solarcrest Condominiums, Vail, Colorado
- 1971: Matheson House, Boulder (destroyed in Marshall Fire, December 30, 2021)
- 1971: Wilson House, Boulder
- 1971: Seminar Center, Boulder
- 1973: Tambor Guest House, Tambor, Costa Rica (unbuilt)
- 1974: Rink Office remodeling, Boulder
- 1974: Dammann II House, Boulder
- 1975: Goodman House, Telluride, Colorado
- 1975: Ford House, Boulder
- 1975: Gosko House, Snowmass
- 1975: Baumgartner House, Brighton, Colorado
- 1976: Johnson House, Boulder
- 1976: Riverside Building, Boulder
- 1978: Roitz House, Boulder
- 1980: Leaneagh House, Boulder
- 1981: Fleck House, Golden, Colorado
- 1982: Chart House Restaurant, Mamaroneck, New York (unbuilt)
- 1983: Mountain Shadows Montessori School, Boulder (unbuilt)
- 1983: Cunningham Addition, Boulder

The Brenton House (1969), also known informally as the "Mushroom House", is notable for making an appearance in Woody Allen's 1973 futuristic sci-fi film, Sleeper, along with several other modernist buildings in Colorado, including I.M. Pei's NCAR labs and Charles Deaton's Sculptured House.
