= Mary Crowley =

Mary Crowley may refer to:

- Mary C. Crowley (1915–1986), American founder and CEO of Home Interiors and Gifts
- Mary Catherine Crowley (1856–1920), American author of poems and novels
- Mary Frances Crowley (1906–1990), Irish educator and nurse
- Mary Medd (1907–2005), née Crowley, British architect
