= Horatio Alger Association of Distinguished Americans =

Non-profit organisation in the USA

Horatio Alger Association of Distinguished Americans, Inc.
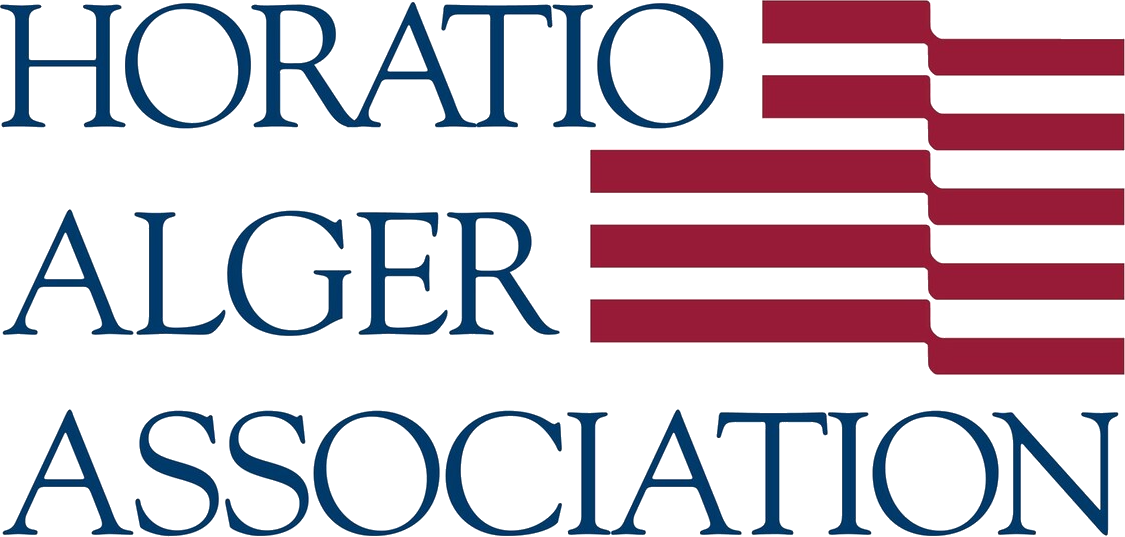
- Formation: 1947; 79 years ago
- Founders: Kenneth Beebe; Norman Vincent Peale
- Type: 501(c)(3)
- Headquarters: Alexandria, Virginia, United States
- Key people: Lesley Albanese; James F. Dicke II; Barbara M. Barrett; James M. Seneff. Jr.; Chris Sullivan; John H. Weiland
- Website: horatioalger.org

The Horatio Alger Association of Distinguished Americans is a nonprofit organization based in Alexandria, Virginia. It was founded in 1947 to promote and ensure the American Dream for future generations, honor the achievements of outstanding Americans who have succeeded in spite of adversity, and to emphasize the importance of higher education. The association is named after Horatio Alger, a 19th-century author of hundreds of dime novels in the "rags-to-riches" genre who extolled the importance of perseverance and hard work.

The association gives the annual Horatio Alger Award to exemplars of its ideals. It also grants scholarships and describes itself as the largest provider of need-based scholarships in the United States. All scholarships are funded by the members of the Horatio Alger Association. As of 2024, the association had given "more than $265 million in college scholarships to roughly 37,000 students".

== Mission ==
According to its website, the Association's mission is to "induct as lifetime Members contemporary role models whose experiences exemplify that opportunities for a successful life are available to all who are dedicated to … integrity, hard work, perseverance and compassion for others". It also provides college scholarships and support services to young people who demonstrate integrity, determination in overcoming adversity and academic potential to make a unique contribution to society.

The organization also seeks to "spread the message that America's free enterprise system provides the greatest opportunities in the world" and to "motivate and educate our nation's young people to the economic and personal opportunities afforded them by the promise of the American free enterprise system".

== Scholarship programs ==
The Horatio Alger Association is one of the largest, privately funded, need-based college scholarship providers in the United States and supports promising under-resourced students with undergraduate, graduate, and career & technical education scholarships. Since the establishment of its scholarship programs in 1984, the Association has awarded more than $265 million in college scholarships to 37,000 students.

=== National Scholars ===
The National Scholars Program was created in 1984 to help American high school students who have overcome adversity attend college. Over time, the Horatio Alger Association has expanded the program. Every year, the Association awards more than 100 need-based scholarships to high school juniors from every U.S. state and the District of Columbia. Grants received by these National Scholars are valued at $25,000 each.

The Association also operates a State Scholars program that gives scholarships to students in every state. Award amounts range from $2,500 to $10,000.

=== Career & Technical Education Scholarship ===
The National Career & Technical Education Scholarship awards $2,500 to students who wish to obtain career or technical degrees. This program was established by the Association’s late Chairman Emeritus and Endowment Fund President Walter Scott, Jr.

=== State Scholarships ===
The association also operates a State Scholars program that gives scholarships to students in every state. Award amounts range from $2,500 to $10,500.

=== Dennis R. Washington Achievement Scholarship ===
Alumni recipients of the scholarship are eligible to receive the Dennis R. Washington Achievement Scholarship. The scholarship is awarded to alumni who are seeking graduate and doctoral degrees. The program is funded by a $10 million grant from Horatio Alger member Dennis R. Washington and his wife, Phyllis.

== Horatio Alger Award ==
The association annually bestows the Horatio Alger Award on Americans who exemplify dedication, purpose, and perseverance in their personal and professional lives. Recipients have often achieved success in the face of adversity. Each award recipient becomes a lifetime member of the association.

The annual award series was inaugurated in 1947 by Kenneth Beebe of the American Schools and Colleges Association. In 1946, he had given achievement awards to two New York City businessmen. In 1947, he renamed the award for Horatio Alger and made four awards to businessmen. Recipients in subsequent years have included business and government leaders, athletes, entertainers, innovators, entrepreneurs, teachers, artists, and writers who have overcome adversity and achieved great success. Approximately, ten American awardees are announced each year. Since 1947, more than 750 distinguished individuals have received the Horatio Alger Award.

Additionally, each year since 2003, an International Horatio Alger Award has been presented to a citizen of another country who serves as a role model and embodies the ideals promoted by the association.

Notable awardees have included the following:

- Hank Aaron, baseball player
- Roger Ailes, television executive
- Buzz Aldrin, astronaut
- Wally Amos, television personality, founder of Famous Amos
- Walter Anderson, magazine editor
- Dwayne Andreas, businessman
- Maya Angelou, poet
- Albert T. Annexstad, businessman
- Anousheh Ansari, engineer, businesswoman
- Philip Anschutz, businessman, investor
- George L. Argyros, diplomat and businessman
- Mary Kay Ash, founder of Mary Kay
- Anthony Athanas, restaurateur
- Bill Austin, businessman
- Bret Baier, journalist
- Robert Ballard, oceanographer
- Bernard Baruch
- Eric Ragnar Benson, businessman
- J. Robert Beyster
- Michael Bloomberg, businessman, New York City mayor
- W. Michael Blumenthal, US secretary of the treasury
- Norman Brinker, restaurateur
- Lou Brock, baseball player
- Tom Brokaw, television journalist, author
- Benjy F. Brooks, pediatric surgeon
- Art Buchwald, political columnist
- Pearl S. Buck, author
- Dean Buntrock, cofounder of Waste Management
- Carol Burnett, entertainer
- Herman Cain, CEO of Godfather's Pizza, presidential candidate
- Chester Carlson
- Ben Carson, neurosurgeon, presidential candidate
- Johnny Cash, country musician
- S. Truett Cathy, founder of Chick-fil-A
- Doris K. Christopher, founder of Pampered Chef
- Mary Higgins Clark, novelist
- Jim Clayton, founder of Clayton Homes
- John B. Connally, governor, cabinet official
- Jenny Craig (entrepreneur)
- Mary C. Crowley, company founder and author
- Nicholas D'Agostino, Sr., immigrant co-founder of D'Agostino Supermarkets
- Charles Deaton, architect, inventor
- Michael E. DeBakey, surgeon
- Fernando De Leon, founder of Leon Capital Group
- Richard DeVos, cofounder of Amway
- Leonardo DiCaprio, actor
- Lou Dobbs, television and radio journalist
- Bob Dole, senator, presidential candidate
- Tom J. Donohue, CEO of the US Chamber of Commerce
- Allen B. DuMont, inventor
- Dwight Eisenhower, Army general and president
- Milton S. Eisenhower
- John Elway, NFL quarterback
- William F. Farley, businessman
- Bob Farrell, founder of Farrell's Ice Cream Parlour
- Ruth Fertel, founder of Ruth's Chris Steak House
- Zachary Fisher, philanthropist, businessman
- Gerald R. Ford, congressman and president
- George Foreman, boxer
- David Foster, musician
- Tommy Franks, Army general
- Allen Gellman, jewelry manufacturer
- Billy Graham, evangelist
- Phil Gramm, senator
- George L. Graziadio, Jr. real estate, developer
- Wayne Gretzky, hockey player
- Duane Hagadone, businessman
- Chuck Hagel, senator
- Joyce C. Hall, founder of Hallmark
- Mark Victor Hansen, co-founder of Chicken Soup for the Soul
- Paul Harvey, radio broadcaster
- Rick Hendrick, owner of NASCAR team Hendrick Motorsports
- Willie Herenton, mayor of Memphis, Tennessee
- Walter J. Hickel, politician
- Conrad N. Hilton, founder of Hilton Hotels
- Joseph H. Hirshhorn
- Elizabeth Holmes, biotechnology entrepreneur convicted of fraud, no longer an association member (unlisted on the association's website)
- Herbert Hoover, president
- Bob Hope, comedian
- H. Wayne Huizenga, businessman
- Arthur Imperatore Sr., entrepreneur, businessman
- Daniel K. Inouye, senator
- Alphonso Jackson, US Secretary of Housing and urban development

- Waylon Jennings, musician
- Rafer L. Johnson, decathlete and film actor
- James Earl Jones, actor
- Quincy Jones, musician
- Y. Michele Kang, businesswoman, sports owner, philanthropist
- Jewel Kilcher, musician
- Ray Kroc, founder of McDonald's
- Jack LaLanne, fitness expert
- Tom Landry, NFL coach (Dallas Cowboys)
- Ken Langone, businessman
- William P. Lear, inventor and businessman
- Jimmy John Liautaud, owner, founder, and chairman of Jimmy John's
- Art Linkletter, radio and television personality
- Ruth B. Love, education administrator
- Rob Lowe, actor
- Clare Boothe Luce, writer, politician, and diplomat
- Allen Ludden, television personality
- David J. Mahoney, CEO, author
- John C. Maxwell, author, professional speaker, pastor
- Reba McEntire, musician
- Rod McKuen, poet, musician
- Ed McMahon, television personality
- Lorne Michaels, writer, producer
- Brian Mulroney
- Joseph Neubauer
- Jean Nidetch
- Katherine D. Ortega
- Norman Vincent Peale, minister, author
- Ruth Stafford Peale, author
- Roger Penske
- H. Ross Perot, technology entrepreneur, presidential candidate
- Roger Tory Peterson
- T. Boone Pickens, energy executive
- Byron Pitts
- Colin L. Powell, Army general, Secretary of State
- Wallace Rasmussen, businessman and philanthropist
- Ronald Reagan, president
- Ryan Reynolds
- Condoleezza Rice, Secretary of State
- Kenny Rogers, musician
- Ralph B. Rogers, industrialist, chairman of PBS
- John W. Rollins, co-founder of Rollins Inc.
- O. Wayne Rollins, co-founder of Rollins Inc.
- Herman J. Russell, entrepreneur and philanthropist
- Harland Sanders, founder of Kentucky Fried Chicken
- Jack Sandner, businessman
- George D. Sax, businessman
- Ray Scott, angler, founder of B.A.S.S.
- Walter Scott, Jr., CEO of Kiewit
- Tom Selleck, actor
- Jane Seymour, actress, author, entrepreneur
- Rose Cook Small, businesswoman
- C. R. Smith, CEO of American Airlines, Army major general, and politician
- David L. Sokol
- Earl W. Stafford, philanthropist and founder of The Stafford Foundation
- Willie Stargell, baseball player
- Roger T. Staubach, NFL player
- Edward Durell Stone
- W. Clement Stone
- Marcia G. Taylor
- Anthony J. Terlato
- Clarence Thomas, Supreme Court Justice
- Danny Thomas, entertainer
- Dave Thomas, founder of Wendy's
- Lowell Thomas, writer, broadcaster, filmmaker
- Tommy Thompson, governor
- Byron Trott, founder and CEO of BDT Capital Partners
- Fred Trump, real-estate developer
- Frank L. VanderSloot, businessman
- Herschel Walker, NFL running back and diplomat
- Dennis R. Washington, businessman
- Denzel Washington, actor
- Lawrence Welk, musician
- Carl Westcott, businessman
- Frederic Whitaker
- Oprah Winfrey, television personality
- Minoru Yamasaki, architect
- Chuck Yeager, Air Force General, test pilot
- Jordan Zimmerman, advertising executive

=== Norman Vincent Peale Award ===
The Norman Vincent Peale Award is presented to a Horatio Alger Member who "has made exceptional humanitarian contributions to society, has been active in the Association, and continues to exhibit courage, tenacity and integrity in the face of great challenges". This award is given in honor of Dr. Norman Vincent Peale, who was a Member of the Horatio Alger Association.

Notable awardees include:

- Tom Selleck
- David L. Sokol
- Joe Neubauer
- Dennis R. Washington
- Clarence Thomas
- Ed McMahon

=== Walter Scott, Jr. Award ===
The Walter Scott, Jr. Award is presented to Horatio Alger Members who have substantially impacted the programs and mission of the Horatio Alger Association through their leadership and exemplary support. The award is named after late Chairman Emeritus Walter Scott, Jr., who was the founder of Association’s State Scholarship Program and the Horatio Alger Endowment Fund. The award was established in 2024 and was bestowed upon its inaugural recipients, Dennis R. Washington and his wife, Phyllis Washington.

=== Visionary Philanthropy Award ===
The Visionary Philanthropy Award recognizes humanitarians who are dedicated to making positive and profound impacts on others. Through their philanthropic efforts, these individuals are working to enhance the way people live, work and serve their communities. The inaugural Visionary Philanthropy Award was presented to Bill Gates in 2023.

== Criticism ==
On July 10, 2023, Business Insider reported that the association had been given unusual access to the Supreme Court of the United States courtroom by Justice Clarence Thomas, who holds annual induction ceremonies for new association members there. On several occasions, Thomas has invited members and scholarship recipients to the Supreme Court.

On July 10, 2023, the Washington Post reported that it was through friendships made in the association that Thomas had been invited to "luxurious vacation retreats, VIP sections of National Football League games, and star-studded events".

== See also ==
- Self-made man
