= Syenna Scott =

American singer-songwriter (born 2000)

- Born: January 21, 2000 (age 26); Charlotte, North Carolina
- Education: Brown University (BA), Frost School of Music at the University of Miami (MA)
- Known for: Musical Composition and Performance
- Style: Alternative Pop, Alternative R&B, Hip Hop
- Height: 5'10
- Website: thesyennascott.com

Syenna Scott is an American-born singer, songwriter, and entrepreneur. She is an alum of Brown University and the Frost School of Music at the University of Miami.

== Early life and education ==
Syenna was born on January 21, 2000, in Charlotte, North Carolina. She attended high school at Charlotte Latin School where she competed as a volleyball, basketball, and track & field athlete. She committed to Brown University in Providence, Rhode Island in 2017, where she competed as a Division 1 jumper and sprinter on the Brown Bears track and field team from 2018 to 2022.

During her time at Brown, Syenna received Ivy League honors in athletics and academics. She sang second-soprano in Brown University's Shades of Brown a cappella group and served on two campus committees dedicated to supporting student athletes. In 2022, Syenna graduated with an Independent Concentration in Entrepreneurship and Music Innovation (B.A), joining less than 1,000 Brown University graduates throughout the school's 261-year history with originally-designed concentrations.

Syenna continued her athletic career on the University of Miami's track & field team as a jumper and sprinter until 2023, where she earned all-division academic honors and athletic honors in the Atlantic Coast Conference. Outside of athletics, Syenna Scott was a member of Cat 5 Music Publishing as a songwriter and joined The Recording Academy's GrammyU program in 2023. Syenna became a finalist in the Hurricane Innovation Prize competition in 2023 for her startup, Musivault. She graduated with a masters in Music Business from the University of Miami's Frost School of Music in 2024.

== Performances ==
Syenna performed across Providence, Rhode Island with the Shades of Brown a cappella group from 2019 to 2022, including Brown University's 2022 Commencement ceremony. After moving to Miami, Florida, she performed in several notable venues including the Maurice Gusman Concert Hall, the Banyan Bowl at Pinecrest Gardens, and the Watsco Center where she sang The Star-Spangled Banner in 2024. In 2025, she performed at the Faena Hotel Miami Beach and The Betsy Hotel on Ocean Drive (South Beach).

== Discography ==
Syenna Scott debuted her first release in 2024, an alternative R&B song called "in the party!". Written as an ode to Miami nightlife, Syenna wrote and co-produced the single in July.

== Entrepreneurship ==
Syenna Scott is the founder and CEO of Musivault, a consulting company and creative collective dedicated to supporting startups within media and entertainment.
