= Albert T. Annexstad =

American businessman and philanthropist

- Born: September 17, 1940; St. Peter, Minnesota
- Died: July 8, 2023 (aged 82); Tiger, Georgia
- Education: Minnesota State University, Mankato
- Occupation: Businessman
- Spouse: Cathy Annexstad
- Children: Thomas Annexstad Patti Marinovich

Albert T. Annexstad is an American businessman and philanthropist.

== Early life ==
Minnesota-born Annexstad graduated from Minnesota State University, Mankato.

== Career ==
Annexstad started his career in marketing at the Federated Mutual Insurance Company in 1965. He served as its President and Chief Executive Officer from 1999 to 2012, and as its Chairman from 2000 to 2012. He retired in 2012.

Annexstad was inducted into the Minnesota Business Hall of Fame in 2006. He was the 2010 recipient of the Horatio Alger Award from the Horatio Alger Association of Distinguished Americans.

== Philanthropy ==
Annexstad co-founded the Annexstad Family Foundation with his wife in 2000. Through their foundation, they give scholarships to Big Brothers Big Sisters alumni who attend college.

He serves on the Board of Trustees of Gustavus Adolphus College. He was the 2005 recipient of an honorary doctorate from the college.

== Personal life ==
Annexstad has a wife, Cathy.
