= Mary Kay Ash =

American businesswoman (1918–2001)

- Born: Mary Kathlyn Wagner; May 12, 1918; Hot Wells, Texas, U.S.
- Died: November 22, 2001 (aged 83); Dallas, Texas, U.S.
- Resting place: Sparkman-Hillcrest Memorial Park Cemetery
- Occupation: Founder of Mary Kay Cosmetics
- Spouses: Ben Rogers (m. 1935; div. 1945); George Hallenbeck (m. 1963; died 1963); Melville J. Ash (m. 1966; died 1980)
- Children: 3
- Parent(s): Edward Alexander Wagner; Lula Vember Hastings

Mary Kay Ash (born Mary Kathlyn Wagner; May 12, 1918 – November 22, 2001) was an American businesswoman and founder of direct sales company Mary Kay Cosmetics, Inc. At the time of her death, she had a fortune of $98 million, and her company had more than $1.2 billion in sales with a sales force of more than 800,000 in at least three dozen countries.

== Early life ==
Mary Kay Ash, born Mary Kathlyn Wagner in Hot Wells, Harris County, Texas, was the daughter of Edward Alexander and Lula Vember Hastings Wagner. Her mother was trained as a nurse and later became a manager of a restaurant in Houston. Ash attended Dow Elementary School and Reagan High School in Houston and graduated in 1934.

Ash married Ben Rogers at age 17. They had three children, Ben Jr., Marilyn Reed, and Richard Rogers. While her husband served in World War II, she sold books door-to-door. After her husband's return in 1945, they got divorced. She later married Charles Weaver, the brother of Mary C. Crowley who was the founder of Home Interiors and Gifts.

== Career ==
Ash went to work for Stanley Home Products in 1939. Frustrated when passed over for a promotion in favor of a man that she had trained, Ash retired in 1963 and intended to write a book to assist women in business. The book turned into a business plan for her ideal company, and in the summer of 1963, Mary Kay Ash and her new husband, George Hallenbeck, planned to start Mary Kay Cosmetics. However, George died of a heart attack that same year. Ash was 45 years old.

One month after George's death, with a $5,000 investment from her oldest son, Ben Rogers, Jr., Ash started Mary Kay Cosmetics. Richard Rogers took George's place in the company. The company started its original storefront operation "Beauty by Mary Kay" in Dallas. They used a 500‐square‐foot storefront with nine saleswomen who had signed up. Ash copied the same “house party” model used by Stanley, Tupperware, and others. A Mary Kay representative would invite her friends over for free facials, then pitch the products. Profits rolled in, with double‐digit growth every year.

According to Gavenas:

Mary Kay was a very visible, very active, and almost ridiculously feminine‐looking role model: a God‐fearing, hard‐working, immaculately groomed mother of three who was doing everything within her power to see other women get ahead, and who loved mentoring so much that she referred to her saleswomen as her “daughters.” Also unlike Avon, Mary Kay made her saleswomen more profit per unit: a Mary Kay lipstick cost roughly double the price of an Avon lipstick and hence made twice the profit, while the home‐party format meant that several customers could be approached at once...Mary Kay made her company purposely inclusive, enabling her rapid expansion into Australia, South America, Europe, and Asia.

== Awards ==
Both during her life and posthumously, Ash received numerous honors from business groups, including the Horatio Alger Award. In 1980, Ash received the Golden Plate Award of the American Academy of Achievement. Ash was inducted into the Junior Achievement U.S. Business Hall of Fame in 1996. A long-time fundraiser for charities, she founded the Mary Kay Ash Charitable Foundation in 1996 to raise money to combat domestic violence and cancers affecting women. Ash served as Mary Kay Cosmetics' chairman until 1987 when she was named Chairman Emeritus. Fortune magazine recognized Mary Kay Inc. by including it in "The 100 best companies to work for in America". The company was also named one of the best 10 companies for women to work. Her last acknowledgments while she was still alive were the "Equal Justice Award" from Legal Services of North Texas in 2001 and "Most Outstanding Woman in Business in the 20th Century" from Lifetime Television in 1999.

== Mary Kay Cosmetics, Inc. ==
Ash and her partners, which included her son Richard, took the company public in 1968. Seventeen years later, in 1985, the Mary Kay Cosmetics board decided to make the company private again. Ash remained active in Mary Kay Cosmetics, Inc. until suffering a stroke in 1996. Richard Rogers was named CEO of Mary Kay Cosmetics, Inc. in 2001. At the time of Ash's death, Mary Kay Cosmetics had over 800,000 representatives in 37 countries, with total annual sales of over $200 million.

== Books ==
Ash was the author of several books, including Mary Kay, an autobiography in 1994 and Miracles Happen and You Can Have It All in 1995. Her first book, called Mary Kay on People Management, was published in 1984 and was on the New York Times Best Seller list.

== Death ==
Mary Kay Ash died on November 22, 2001. She is interred in the Sparkman-Hillcrest Memorial Park Cemetery in Dallas, Texas.
