= Charles Deaton =

American architect (1921–1996)

- Born: Charles Utter Deaton; January 1, 1921; Clayton, New Mexico, U.S.
- Died: December 18, 1996 (aged 75); Morrison, Colorado, U.S.
- Occupation: Architect
- Buildings: Sculptured House; Arrowhead Stadium; Kauffman Stadium; Wyoming National Bank of Casper
- Design: Truman Sports Complex

Charles Utter Deaton (January 1, 1921 – December 18, 1996) was an American architect. He designed several athletic stadiums, and is noted for his futuristic Sculptured House that was featured in the 1973 film Sleeper. He is also noted as the designer of Kansas City's Arrowhead Stadium and Kauffman Stadium.

== Biography ==
Deaton was born on January 1, 1921 in Clayton, New Mexico. His father was an oil geologist and his mother was an artist. Growing up, his family lived in a tent on the Oklahoma plains for two years.

Deaton started his career as a designer and inventor. He received additional patents for his various commercial designs, including furniture and interior lighting. He received his final US Letters Patent 4,688,357 in 1987 for a multi-use baseball/football sports stadium with movable seating.

Deaton was also a board game designer who received three US Patents for that work. He applied for his first patent at age 19 for the board game Gusher, which was marketed by Carrom Industries of Michigan from 1940 through the early 1960s. Deaton received US Letters Patent 2,299,803 for Gusher in 1942.

Gusher is something of an improved version of Monopoly-style trading games, with oil wildcatting as its theme. The main improvement in this game is that the board itself actually helps influence the outcome of the game: the game board is shaken before playing commences, and pieces that are distributed internally then determine which" holes" are dry wells or gushers.

Deaton's other two patents also involve games which utilize interactive boards. He received US Letters Patent 2,295,452 in 1942 for Magnetic Minesweeper, marketed in 1941 by the Walco Bead Co. of New York City. He received US Letters Patent 4,078,805 in 1978 for Country Road.

Deaton only ever earned his high school diploma but studied structural engineering, industrial design and architecture on his own, earning certification. He designed the futuristic Sculptured House on Genesee Mountain near Denver, Colorado that was featured in the Woody Allen movie Sleeper. He also designed a similar Key Savings and Loan Association (now Colonial Bank) building in Englewood, Colorado and the Wyoming National Bank (now The M Building) in Casper, Wyoming.

In his early career as an architect, Deaton started in the 1940s in New York City and St. Louis, before settling in the Denver area in 1955, where he would live for the rest of his life.

In 1967, Kansas City, Missouri was planning to build a new multipurpose arena for its professional baseball and football teams. Deaton caught the ear of Kansas City Chiefs General Manager Jack Steadman and suggested building side-by-side stadiums for the two sports with each stadium customized to its needs. The entire complex would share parking facilities and highway infrastructure. Deaton's design for Arrowhead Stadium and Kauffman Stadium (known collectively as the Truman Sports Complex) was implemented by Kivett and Myers.

In 1969, the Horatio Alger Association of Distinguished Americans honored Deaton by naming him to its membership.

Deaton died in Morrison, Colorado at the age of 75.

== Style and philosophy ==
Deaton was known as a "Sculptural Architect". He worked in a sheet metal factory during World War II, where he discovered the ability to create any shape he could conceive, an idea he carried into his architecture career.

Deaton believed that curved architecture was superior to straight lines and angles. His buildings break away from the common straight and rectangular forms of America at the time, and reflect a more Expressionist and Non-Euclidian geometry and design. He thought that architecture should mirror the natural world, where rounded shapes are abundant. These philosophies can be seen in his well known designs, like the Sculptured House, Key Savings and Loan Association, and Wyoming National Bank.

Deaton would model his projects as wood, plaster and clay, before drawing up architectural plans based on his original designs. His sculptural model of the Key Savings and Loan Association is still intact and held in a collection of his drawings and works at the Denver Public Library.

When he built, Deaton believed in complete control of every facet of the project, designing not only the structure itself, but the interior down to the last detail.

== Gallery ==
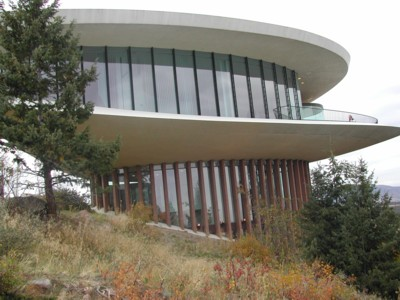
The Sculptured House, 1963

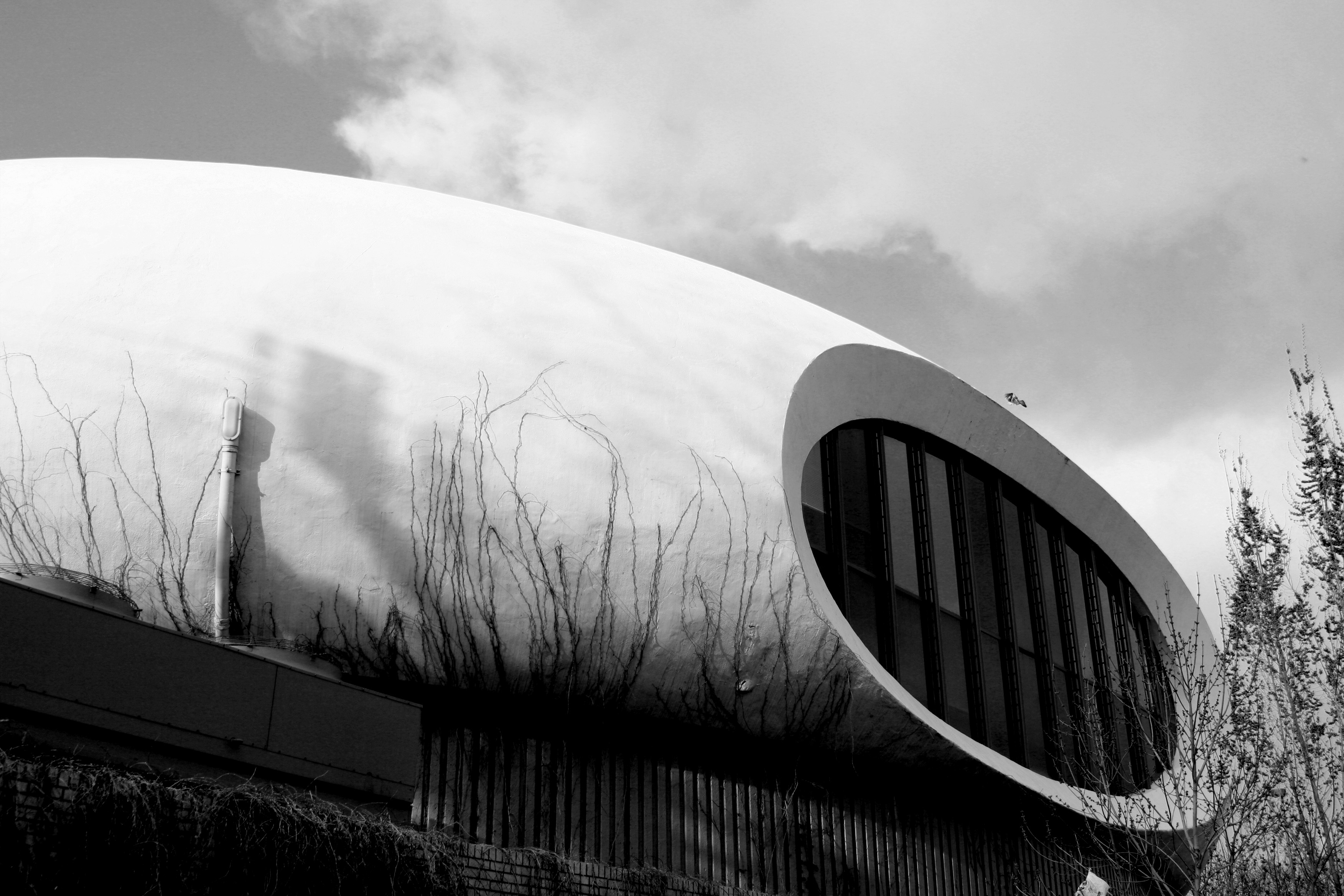
Key Savings and Loan Building, 1965

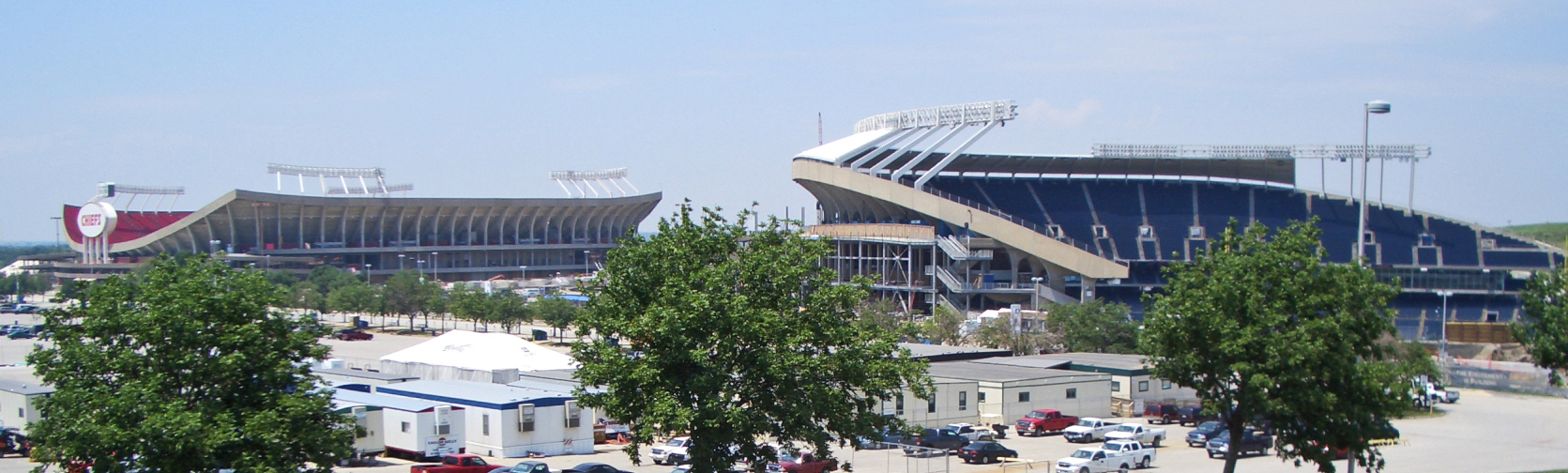
Truman Sports Complex, 1972

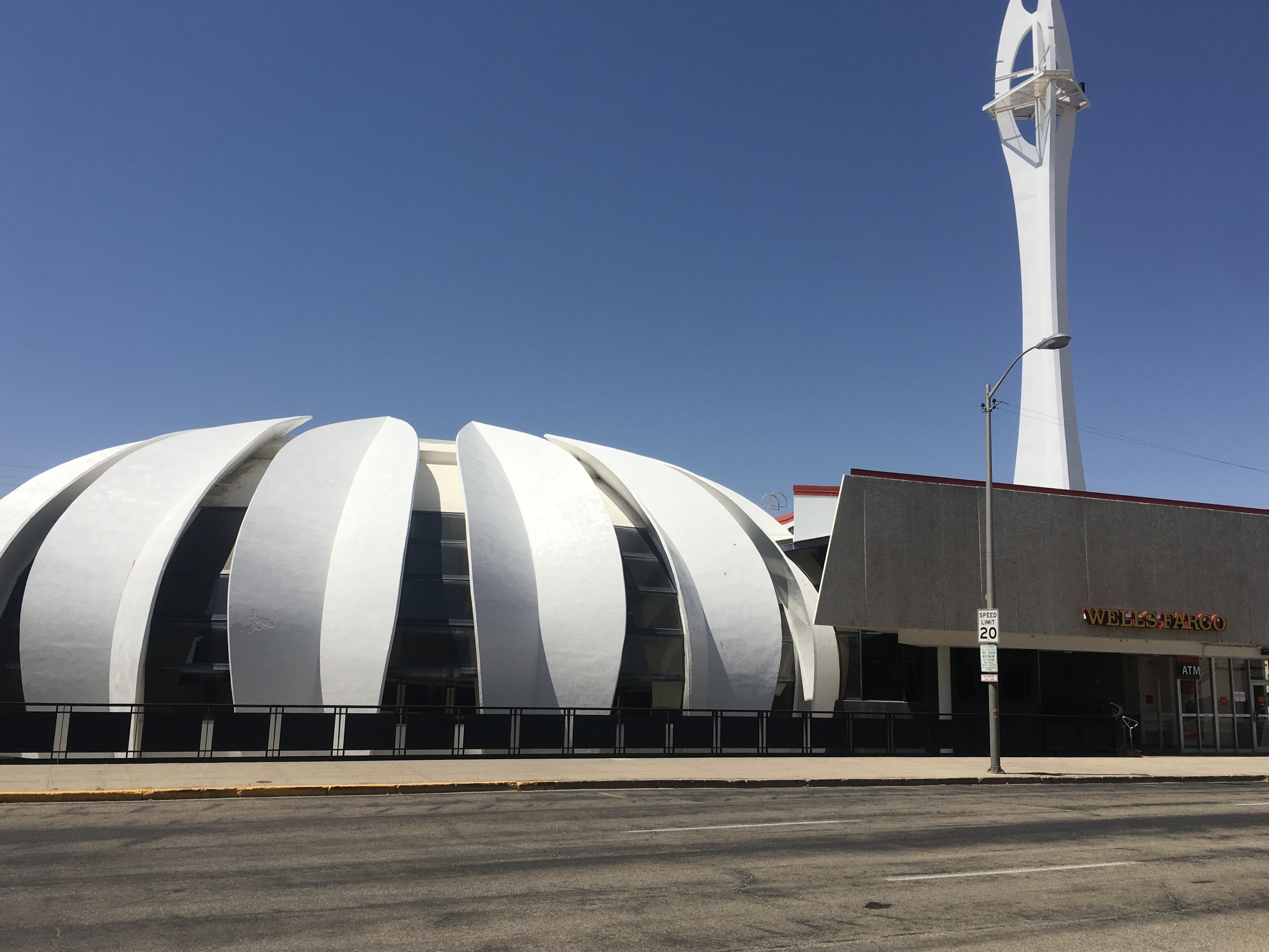
Wyoming National Bank (1964)
