= Eileen Monaghan Whitaker =

Eileen Monaghan Whitaker (1911–2005) was an American painter known for her watercolors. She was married to painter Frederic Whitaker, with whom she sometimes had joint exhibits. Eileen was a member of the American Watercolor Society, and in 1978 she became only the second woman to be elected to the National Academy of Design's watercolor division.
