= Frederic Whitaker =

American designer and painter

Frederic Whitaker (1891–1980) was an American designer, painter and author.

== Biography ==
Born in Providence, Rhode Island, Frederic Whitaker began his working career as an apprentice designer with W. J. Feeley and Co., manufacturers of metal-ware, where he soon rose to head of design. He went on to work with Gorham Manufacturing Company and Tiffany & Co., both noted producers of fine silver, and later bought and built up two companies on his own, Foley and Dugan in Providence and G.H. Seffert in New York.

During this time Whitaker was also actively painting, working mainly in watercolors, and in 1949 he retired from business to devote all his attention to painting, writing, and art-related philanthropic activities.

Whitaker was a member of the National Academy of Design, served seven years as president of the American Watercolor Society, and founded Audubon Artists, whose purpose is to speak for all aspects of the visual arts. He also served on numerous other boards and organizations. Whitaker also wrote two books and more than 90 articles on art-related topics.

Whitaker's wife Eileen Monaghan Whitaker, married in 1943, was also a painter of note -- a member of the American Watercolor Society, the recipient of many awards, and in 1978 she became the second woman elected to the National Academy of Design's watercolor division. The couple often exhibited their work in joint shows.

== Awards ==
Over his career Whitaker received more than 150 awards from art organizations across the United States, among them the Horatio Alger Award, and was made a Fellow of Britain's Royal Society of Arts. His work is in the permanent collections of the Metropolitan Museum of Art, Boston Museum of Fine Arts, National Academy of Design, and the Hispanic Museum, as well as museums and galleries from California to Connecticut.
