= Allen Gellman =

American businessman, jewelry manufacturer and inventor

- Born: April 19, 1906; Fegyvernek, Austria-Hungary
- Died: September 13, 1967 (aged 61); Los Angeles, U.S.
- Other name: Adalbert Béla Gellman
- Occupation: Jewelry manufacturer
- Known for: Association with Groucho Marx
- Awards: Election to the Horatio Alger Association of Distinguished Americans, 1956

Allen B. Gellman (April 19, 1906 – September 13, 1967) was an American jewelry manufacturer and first sponsor of You Bet Your Life, the radio (and later TV) program hosted by Groucho Marx. Gellman was elected to the Horatio Alger Association of Distinguished Americans in 1956. He was president of the Elgin American jewelry company.

== Early years and career ==
Allen Gellman was born as Adalbert Béla Gellman. He emigrated from Hungary to the United States in 1930, aged 24 and became a naturalized citizen on January 11, 1939. He worked as a machinist, attended night school, and began manufacturing costume jewelry.

Gellman and a partner, Joseph Weiss, owned and operated the Illinois Watch Case Company in Elgin, manufacturing compacts and cigarette lighters, and the U.S. Wind Engine and Pump Company in Batavia, making farm equipment. In 1941, with the government restricting commercial production in order to allocate material and manpower to war production, Gellman and Weiss needed a government contract. Gellman met Henry Garsson in Washington outside a congressman's office. When Garsson described his requirements for the manufacture of shells, Gellman agreed to provide the means to fill them.

Garsson and his older brother, Murray Garsson, had started a munitions contracting business in 1941. A Kentucky congressman, Andrew J. May, chairman of the House Military Affairs Committee during World War II, facilitated the Garssons' enterprise.

After the war, a Senate investigating committee reviewing the Garsson's munitions business discovered evidence that May had received substantial cash payments and other inducements from the Garssons.

== Inventor ==
Gellman held patents for lighters, compacts, filler valves, and a container for personal items. Gellman's inventiveness extended to his office desk, which he designed with hidden elevators and pivoting drawers, giving him fingertip control over everything inside.

== Groucho Marx ==
Gellman, president of the Elgin American Company, maker of watch cases, cigarette lighters, and compacts, was the first sponsor of You Bet Your Life, Groucho Marx's radio program, on ABC Radio and CBS Radio from October 1947 to January 1950. This company is unrelated to the Elgin National Watch Company.

== Later life and death ==
Gellman was elected to the Horatio Alger Association of Distinguished Americans, 1956. He died from cardiovascular disease, aged 61.
