= Marcia G. Taylor =

American businesswoman (born 1944)

- Born: 1944 (age 81–82); Bluford, Illinois, United States
- Occupations: Businesswoman; Philanthropist
- Years active: 1971–present
- Organization: Bennett Family of Companies
- Spouse: J.D. Garrison
- Children: 3

Marcia G. Taylor (born 1944) is an American businesswoman and philanthropist. She is the owner and chief executive officer (CEO) of Bennett Family of Companies.

== Early life ==
Taylor was born in Bluford, Illinois in 1944 and was raised on a multigenerational family farm that produced soybeans, wheat, corn, and hay. When she was 14, her father died of a heart attack, and her mother sold the family's farm and equipment.

Taylor married at 16. By the age of 19, she had three children and worked two jobs, at a pharmacy during the day and a bar at night, to support her family. After experiencing domestic abuse, she left the marriage and moved with her children to Georgia.

== Career ==
In 1971, Taylor entered the trucking industry with Specialized Truck Services in Georgia, where she met and later married J.D. Garrison, who mentored her in the business. In 1974, the couple purchased George Bennett Motor Express with $500 in cash and credit. At the time, the company had 15 trucks, 30 trailers, and two contracts. By 1981, it had stabilized and become profitable. That year, Garrison died from a bacterial infection caused by a contaminated syringe at a smoking cessation clinic in Houston, Texas. Taylor assumed sole leadership of the company after the death of her husband. The company later became Bennett International Group LLC, a national logistics firm. It operates today as a third-generation family business, employing her three adult children and several grandchildren. Bennett International Group, was named Georgia's Family Business of the Year in 2012.

== Philanthropy ==
In 2012, Taylor founded The Taylor Family Foundation to support local and national charities, focusing on health care, patriotic causes, women and children in crisis, and educational scholarships for young adults returning to school. In 2015, Taylor established a scholarship at the Clayton State University for supply chain management students.

== Awards and recognition ==
- 2012: National Transportation Award
- 2014: Influential Woman in Trucking by the Fleet Equipment Magazine
- 2016: Honorary doctorate of commerce from Clayton State University
- 2017: Horatio Alger Association of Distinguished Americans
- 2017: Women Who Mean Business Award, given by the Atlanta Business Journal
- 2021: DAR Women in History Award
