= Ralph B. Rogers =

American businessman

Ralph Burton Rogers (November 30, 1909 – November 4, 1997) was an American industrialist, philanthropist and PBS executive, called the "Founding Father of the Public Broadcasting Service."

== Biography ==
He was born on November 30, 1909, in Boston, Massachusetts. He was educated at Boston Latin School and Northeastern University. As a businessman, Rogers worked for or ran many industrial firms, including Cummins Diesel Engine and Indian Motorcycles.

In 1950, he started work with Texas Industries in Dallas and by 1951 he was chairman of the board, president, and chief executive officer of this company. It became a Fortune 500 company with many interests but remains focused on cement production.

Rogers became civically and politically active in the 1960s. In 1972, he is credited with saving the Public Broadcasting Service during the Nixon Administration. As chairman of PBS (1973-1979) he organized more than 200 independent stations into a national television system. He later co-founded the Children's Television Workshop, and became a significant philanthropist, primarily in the Dallas area.

He died on November 4, 1997.

== Awards and honors ==
- Horatio Alger Award. According to the Horatio Alger Association of Distinguished Americans, the award "symbolizes the Association's values, including personal initiative and perseverance, leadership and commitment to excellence, belief in the free-enterprise system and the importance of higher education, community service, and the vision and determination to achieve a better future."
- 1978 Ralph Lowell Award, by which the Corporation for Public Broadcasting "recognizes outstanding contributions and achievements to public television."

== See also ==
- Hartford N. Gunn Jr.
