= Donald Carter (businessman) =

American businessman (1933–2018)

Donald J. Carter
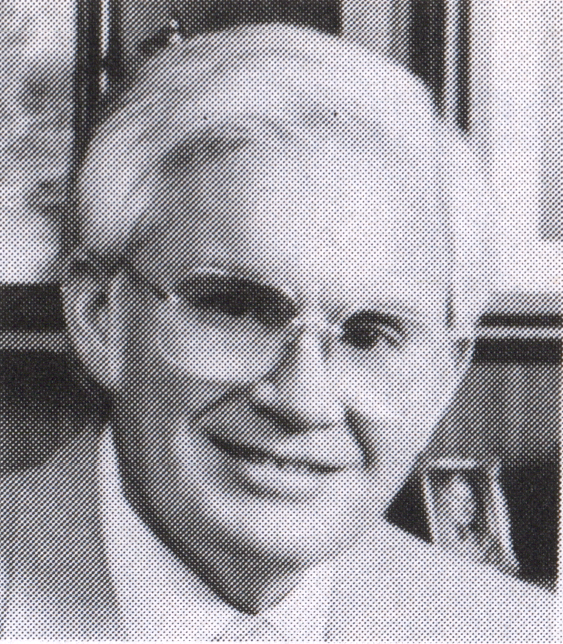
- Carter circa 1984
- Born: July 5, 1933; Arkansas, U.S.
- Died: February 14, 2018 (aged 84); Dallas, Texas, U.S.
- Other name: Don Carter
- Occupations: Investor, business leader
- Known for: Founder of Dallas Mavericks & Dallas Sidekicks
- Spouse: Linda Jo Carter
- Children: 3
- Parent: Mary C. Crowley

Donald J. Carter (July 5, 1933 – February 14, 2018) was an American investor and businessman who was a founding owner of the Dallas Mavericks of the National Basketball Association (NBA) and the Dallas Sidekicks of the Major Indoor Soccer League (MISL). At the time of his death he was a minority partner in the Mavericks and a familiar courtside presence at the team's home games, always wearing a cowboy hat.

== Early life ==
Carter was born into a poor family in Arkansas on July 5, 1933. Carter's mother remarried when he was 15. He dropped out of high school and got a job at a gas station that paid enough to keep the car he used for drag racing running.

After doing his military service in the U.S. Air Force, he joined his mother, Mary C. Crowley, in the successful company she founded selling interior decoration with a home party plan, Home Interiors and Gifts. The business was sold to Hicks, Muse, Tate & Furst and netted Carter millions of dollars.

== Career ==
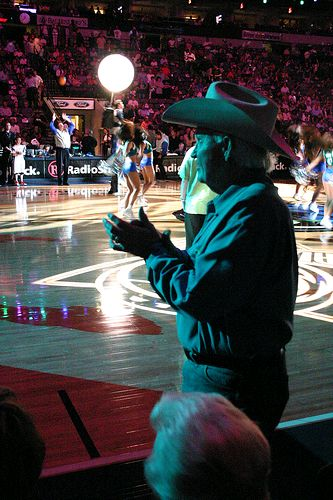
Don Carter at a Dallas Mavericks game in 2006

Carter, along with Norm Sonju, founded an NBA expansion team, the Dallas Mavericks, in 1980. When Sonju had difficulty securing the funds needed for the US$12 million expansion entry fee, Carter stepped forward to guarantee its payment. This initial investment in the team (US$46.9 million in today's terms) eventually earned him US$125 million (US$257 million in today's terms) when he sold the team in 1996 to an investment group led by Ross Perot Jr.

Over the years, Carter owned many different types of businesses, including a Rolls-Royce dealership. Other businesses include banks, trucking firms, hotels, rodeo arenas, and cattle ranches. In the 2011 championship win by the Dallas Mavericks over the Miami Heat he was given the honor of receiving the Larry O'Brien trophy by Mark Cuban as the first owner. He retained a minority stake in the Mavericks (4% at the time of his death) and frequently attended Mavericks games until he died in 2018.

== Personal life and death ==
Carter had two sons, Donald J. “Joey” Carter Jr. and Ronald L. Carter, and a daughter, Christi Carter Urschel with his wife of 58 years, Linda Jo.

Carter died at his home in Dallas, Texas on February 14, 2018, at the age of 84.

== See also ==
- Dallas Mavericks
- Dallas Sidekicks

== Bibliography ==
- Aron, Jaime (2003). Tales of the Dallas Mavericks. Sports Publishing. ISBN 978-1-58261-563-9.
- Falk, David (2009). The Bald Truth: Secrets of Success from the Locker Room to the Boardroom. Simon and Schuster. ISBN 978-1-4165-8438-4.

Sporting positions
First	Dallas Mavericks owner 1980–1996	Succeeded by Ross Perot Jr.
