= Mary C. Crowley =

American business executive (b. 1915, d. 1986)

Mary C. Crowley (April 1, 1915 – June 1986), was the founder and CEO of the Texas-based Home Interiors and Gifts, Inc., which became one of the largest direct sales home furnishing operations in America. She was considered to be one of the leading businesswomen in the United States in the 1970s. Crowley was also a published author of works on women in business, and on self-improvement for women.

== Early life ==
Mary Elizabeth Weaver was born on April 1, 1915 in Missouri. Her mother died when she was eighteen months old and Crowley lived with her grandparents on a farm in Missouri for five years, before moving back with her father and stepmother, but later moving back with her grandparents. Years later, during depths of the Great Depression, Crowley was divorced (her first husband was Carter), with two children, Don and Ruth. Crowley got a job in Dallas, Texas and attended Southern Methodist University in the evenings. She worked in sales at Stanley Home Products in home accessories.

== Career ==
=== Home Interiors and Gifts ===
In 1957, Mary C. Crowley founded Home Interiors and Gifts. Crowley's business was one of which that sold directly to customers through a home party plan.

By 1962, Crowley and her daughter Ruth were running Home Interiors & Gifts, Inc., when the company's sales reached its first million dollars.

In 1977, Crowley was one of twenty business owners invited to meet President Jimmy Carter in the White House.

When the company celebrated its 20th anniversary with a three-day gathering attended by the company's top 10,000 saleswomen, it included celebrities including Bob Hope and Billy Graham. At the time, Crowley was said to be earning $1 million annually. According to the Texas Monthly, the "millionairess" owned "a Dallas mansion, two Lear jets, and a Colorado mountain retreat."

By 1983, sales had grown to be $400 million, and Crowley's business had become a multi-million dollar corporation, and one of the largest direct sales home furnishing operations in America. Crowley became the first woman to serve on the Dallas Chamber of Commerce.

In 1986, after Crowley died, her son Donald J. Carter became CEO and president of the corporation, and in 1994, Carter agreed to sell the company to Hicks, Muse, Tate & Furst for over $850 million.

==== Management style ====
Crowley was a devout Christian and an active philanthropist. She was the first woman to serve on the board of Billy Graham's evangelistic association. Crowley encouraged a nondenominational faith among employees, urging them to put "God first, family second, career third."

Crowley was a career woman who put her beliefs and philosophy into her work. She was a generous person; during the holidays she allowed her employees to go on a supermarket shopping spree and she would pick up the tab.

She would open meetings at Home Interiors with a Bible verse, introducing, for example, a verse from Proverbs by saying, "Let's see what King Solomon had to say about leadership." Her marketing philosophy is "codified" in her book Think Mink!. Crowley, who owned a mink-covered Bible, used mink briefcases and coats as sales incentives in a system analogous to the Mary Kay Pink Cadillacs.

=== Writing and speaking ===
Crowley published a number of books on women in business and on self-improvement for women. Her book of aphorisms had gone through 39 printings by 1989 with 600,000 copies in circulation. She was also an in-demand speaker.

== Personal life ==
"Crowley" was the surname of her second husband, David M. Crowley, Jr., whom she married in 1948. Crowley was divorced from her first husband and had reared her son, Don Carter, and daughter, Ruth, as a single mother. Crowley remarried when Don Carter was 15. Ruth was known as Ruth Carter and as Ruth Shanahan, or Ruth Carter Shanahan, after her marriage to Ralph Shanahan.

Mary Kay Ash, founder of Mary Kay Cosmetics party plan company, was married to Mary (Weaver) Crowley's brother, Charles William Weaver.

In 1957, Crowley was diagnosed with cervical cancer, but after treatment with an investigational drug, she remained in remission for 27 years until 1984, when she was once again diagnosed with cancer and died shortly after. In 1997, "Mary Crowley Cancer Research", an independent 501(c)(3) non-profit, was established to conduct research into gene and cellular therapies.

== Honors ==
- In 1978, Crowley won the Horatio Alger Award, given to an outstanding businessperson, as did her makeup mogul friend, Mary Kay Ash.
- In 1986, she received a Ruth Award from Dallas Baptist University.
- One of Dallas Baptist University's seven colleges is named the "Mary C. Crowley College of Christian Faith" in her honor.

== Works ==
- Moments with Mary. Dallas: Crescendo Book Publications. 1973. OCLC 650785.
- Think Mink!. Old Tappan, N.J.: Fleming H. Revell. 1976. ISBN 978-0800708108. Reprinted as You Can Too!
- Women Who Win. Old Tappan, N.J.: Fleming H. Revell. 1979. ISBN 978-0800709938. OCLC 4774535.
- A Pocketful of Hope: Daily Devotions for Women. Old Tappan, N.J.: Fleming H. Revell. 1981. ISBN 978-0800712723.
- Decorate Your Home With Love. Old Tappan, N.J: Fleming H. Revell. 1986. ISBN 978-0800714543.
