= Murray Garsson =

American arms manufacturer

- Born: May 14, 1890; London, England
- Died: March 26, 1957 (aged 66); New York City, USA
- Known for: Garsson war parts scandal
- Spouse(s): Rose Garsson (died 1942); Ruth Levy Garsson (divorced 1952)

Murray Wolfe Garsson (born May 14, 1890, London, England; died March 26, 1957, New York City, USA, age 66) was a munitions manufacturer, who with his brother, Henry Garsson, defrauded the US Government and was responsible for the downfall of Congressman Andrew J. May.

== Birth and early career ==
Murray Garsson was born in London, England and came to the US as a two-year-old child. He was a businessman active in various motion picture and real estate ventures before World War II. In 1932 he was Special US Assistant Secretary of Labor, and from 1934 to 1937 he was director of the Select Committee of the US House of Representatives to investigate bondholder reorganizations.

== Munitions manufacture ==
Garsson and his younger brother Henry (11 April 1896 – November 1983) started a munitions contracting business in 1941 with a letter to the war department on borrowed stationery on behalf of a non-existent company, Erie Basin Metal Products Inc. A small order for shell fuses led to development of a combine with $78 million in government contracts. Garsson found two men, Allen Gellman and Joseph Weiss of Chicago, who had a company, Illinois Watch Case, that made watch cases and compacts but had no war contracts. The Garssons, Gellman, and Weiss became associates.

Their factory produced 4.2-inch mortar shells with defective fuzes, resulting in premature detonation and the deaths of 38 American soldiers.

== Congressman May ==
A Kentucky Congressman, Andrew J. May, chairman of the House Military Affairs Committee during World War II, facilitated the Garssons' enterprise. May often telephoned army ordnance and other government officials on the Garssons' behalf to award war contracts, obtain draft deferments, and secure other favors for the Garssons and their friends. So numerous were these interventions that one ordnance official referred to them as "blitz calls." After the war, a Senate investigating committee reviewing the Garssons' munitions business discovered evidence that May had received substantial cash payments and other inducements from the Garssons.

== Imprisonment ==
In 1949, May and the Garsson brothers were sentenced to two years, eight months in prison. May was released in 1950 and the Garssons in 1951.

== Last years and death ==
After his release from prison, Murray Garsson was impoverished and subsisted on the charity of friends. Dr. Josephson prescribed barbiturates for Garsson. On March 7, 1957, Garsson was found unconscious at the foot of a staircase in the 61st Street building. He was taken to Bellevue Hospital, where he died a few days later. Milton Helpern, the chief medical examiner, performed an autopsy and determined the cause of death was brain hemorrhage, the result of a fall down a flight of stairs.
