= George D. Sax =

American businessman and hotelier

George D. Sax (April 14, 1904 – March 12, 1974) was an American businessman and hotelier, who served as the chairman of the board of Exchange International Corporation and Chicago's former Exchange National Bank (now part of LaSalle Bank). He was president of Sax Enterprises, Inc and was a business entrepreneur who owned the Saxony Hotel, the first luxury hotel to be built in Miami Beach.

== Biography ==
Sax was born and raised in Peoria, Illinois. He graduated from Brown's Business College (now Midstate College) in Peoria.

In 1944, Sax took over Halsted Exchange National Bank after purchasing a controlling share. He renamed the bank The Exchange National Bank of Chicago and moved it to downtown Chicago.

Sax is credited with the innovation of several banking practices that have since been adopted worldwide - drive-through banking and instant loans. Later in his banking career, Sax devised such practices as open credit accounts. The Exchange National Bank had 10 teller windows and was the first in the Loop to feature show windows. The Sax family maintained control of Exchange for over thirty years.

After World War II, Sax was involved in another business venture - the building of the Saxony Hotel. The Saxony was the very first luxury hotel built in Miami Beach and was the first hotel to have central air-conditioning. Among the most lavish resorts in the country, the Saxony was frequently used by heads of state and featured rooms with glorious views, air conditioning, and complementary meals.

His granddaughter, Anita Sax, is a children's book author and publisher. Anita Sax was born in Chicago, Illinois and raised in Mexico City, Mexico. Her passion for writing began at a young age after a school project led her to write her first short story. She has been writing ever since.

== Accolades ==
In 1965, Sax received the Horatio Alger Award, an honor given to those who have achieved the American dream through hard work and adversity. Other notable Horatio Alger Award winners include former U.S. Presidents Dwight D. Eisenhower, Gerald R. Ford, and Ronald Reagan, McDonald's founder Ray Kroc and former astronaut Buzz Aldrin.

== External links and references ==
- The Horatio Alger Association of Distinguished Americans: George D. Sax - Biography from the association.
- Historic Peoria: George D. Sax - Biography
