= Hartford N. Gunn Jr. =

Founding President of PBS

- Born: December 24, 1927; Port Washington, New York, US
- Died: January 7, 1986 (aged 58); Boston, Massachusetts, US
- Education: United States Merchant Marine Academy (BA); Harvard University (BA); Harvard Business School (MBA)
- Years active: 1969–1986
- Known for: Founding president of PBS

Hartford N. Gunn Jr. (December 24, 1927 – January 7, 1986) was the founding president of the Public Broadcasting Service (PBS).

== Early life and education ==
Gunn was born in December 24, 1927 in Port Washington, on Long Island, New York, to mother Edith Arnold Gunn and father Hartford N. Gunn, who later served as the Town Supervisor of the Town of North Hempstead. In 1948, he graduated from the U.S. Merchant Marine Academy in King's Point, New York. Gunn received a second bachelor's degree at Harvard University in 1949, and went on to study at Harvard Business School, receiving his MBA in 1951.

He served as a lieutenant commander in the U.S. Naval Reserve, and was voted one of the outstanding men of the year in 1962 by the Boston Junior Chamber of Commerce.

== Career ==
After graduating from Harvard Business School in 1951, Gunn started working at Boston's WGBH-TV. At the time he started, WGBH was an FM radio station and he expanded it to include a television station.

Over the next five years, he had the role of director of operations before assuming the position of general manager in 1957.

In 1969 as manager of WGBH-TV, Gunn invited Fred Rogers to accompany him and testify before the Senate Subcommittee on Communications in support of the full funding of the Corporation for Public Broadcasting.

In 1970 he was chosen as the first president of the Public Broadcasting Service, at least in part due to his "widely acknowledged success in the 1960s at the Boston television station WGBH".

Gunn became vice-chairman of PBS in 1976. He was senior vice president and general manager of KCET, (at the time it was the public TV station in Los Angeles) from 1979 until 1983. Before his death he worked as a public television consultant in Annapolis, Maryland where he had lived.

In 1964, he was the recipient of the Lamp of Knowledge Award for his contribution to educational television and radio. Gunn also received the third annual Ralph Lowell Medal for creative public broadcasting in 1973.

== Death ==
On January 2, 1986, Gunn died of multi-focal leukoencephalopathy – a rare, cancer-related illness – at Massachusetts General Hospital,aged 59.

== See also ==
- Ralph B. Rogers
