= Earl W. Stafford =

American entrepreneur and philanthropist

Earl W. Stafford Sr.
- Born: May 14, 1948 (age 78); New Jersey, United States
- Education: University of Massachusetts Amherst, and Southern Illinois University (MBA)
- Occupations: Entrepreneur and philanthropist
- Known for: Founder of The Stafford Foundation
- Spouse: Amanda Boardley
- Children: 3

Earl W. Stafford, Sr. (born May 14, 1948) is an American entrepreneur and philanthropist. He is the founder of The Stafford Foundation, and was inducted into the Horatio Alger Association of Distinguished Americans in 2010.

He is the founder and former CEO of Unitech, a training and simulation technology manufacturer, and is the founder and CEO of The Wentworth Group, LLC, a private-equity and financial consulting firm headquartered in Reston, Virginia.

He is also known for "The People's Inaugural Project", which brought more than 400 disadvantaged and underserved individuals to Washington D.C. for a three-day, deluxe celebration of President Barack Obama's inauguration. In February 2015, President Obama appointed him to serve as a member of the board of trustees of the Woodrow Wilson International Center for Scholars.

== Early life and education ==
Stafford was raised in Mount Holly Township, New Jersey. He was the ninth of 12 children of his parents Mabel (née Willis) and Robert E. Stafford. His father was a part-time assistant minister at a church his ancestors helped found, the Second Baptist Church in Mount Holly, and also worked full-time as a laborer at the Campbell's for more than 40 years.

Stafford began his entrepreneurial career at age eight by selling hot dogs and mowing lawns.

He received a bachelor's degree in business from the University of Massachusetts Amherst and an MBA from Southern Illinois University. He is a graduate of the OPM Executive Program at Harvard Business School.

== Career ==
Before entering the corporate world, Stafford had a 20-year career in the U.S. military. He enlisted in the U.S. Air Force in 1967 and retired as a Captain in 1987. He served as Assistant Air Force Liaison Officer to the Federal Aviation Administration from 1982 to 1985. In that capacity, he was responsible for ensuring that U.S. Department of Defense initiatives and programs were integrated into the FAA's National Airspace System modernization effort. Among his many assignments in the Air Force, he served as the Commander of the 2004th Communications Squadron at Sondrestrom Air Base, Greenland in 1985–1986.

After retiring from the Air Force in 1987, in 1988 Stafford founded Universal Systems & Technology, Inc. (UNITECH), a training and simulation technology company supplying training for the military, defense, health care, and financial sectors. He was the company's chairman and CEO, and sold it to Lockheed Martin in 2009.

In 2008 Stafford founded The Wentworth Group, LLC, a private equity and financial services and consulting firm based in Reston, Virginia, which supports small businesses, and he is its CEO.

Stafford currently serves on the boards of the Woodrow Wilson International Center for Scholars, the Horatio Alger Association of Distinguished Americans, the National Symphony Orchestra, the Smithsonian's National Museum of African American History and Culture, the Apollo Theater Foundation, and Trustee Emeritus of the Wesley Theological Seminary.

== Philanthropy ==
Stafford has made major philanthropic contributions in the form of investing in the underprivileged.

=== The Stafford Foundation ===
In 2002 he founded the faith-based nonprofit organization, The Stafford Foundation (TSF), Inc., based in Reston, VA.

Since the foundation began its grantmaking program it has donated more than $4 million to organizations and individuals.

=== The People's Inaugural Project ===
In March 2008, Stafford conceived the idea of an event to bring disadvantaged people from all walks of life to Washington, D.C., to be part of the 2009 presidential inaugural celebration. The idea manifested into the People's Inaugural Project, which, in January 2009, brought more than 400 disadvantaged people to the inauguration of President Obama.

More than 2,000 individuals attended in total, including representatives from more than 40 nonprofit groups that help people in need, such as wounded veterans, homeless individuals, and severely disabled adults. The 300 disadvantaged guests were lodged in rooms at the JW Marriott and participated in several events over the course of three days, including a 1,000-person Prayer Breakfast, a 1,000-person Martin Luther King Luncheon with a keynote speech by Martin Luther King III, a viewing of the inaugural parade from the JW Marriott 12th floor terrace, and a main inaugural ball. TSF is continuing to partner with these organizations as part of building a community of doing good for those in need.

==== The People's Project and the Doing Good campaign ====
Since the People's Inaugural Project, The Stafford Foundation has continued its investment in underserved people through continued outreach. The People's Project encompasses initiatives through grants that support programs with viable nonprofits groups aligned with TSF's mission. Since the fall of 2009, TSF has supported the work of 30 organizations with grants totaling more than $1 million.

The People's Project 2010 national initiative focused on "Doing Good". In January 2010, The Stafford Foundation (TSF) launched a national movement to motivate people to help others in need by Doing Good. The campaign is based on the principle of helping those in need become self-reliant so that they will in turn be inspired to help others. The effort focuses on ways to help people with job-training, health and wellness, and mission-based support. The campaign will result in bringing support and services to people in need to help them become self-sufficient and live in dignity. The impact ranges from supporting women's homeless shelters that also provide job training to helping low-income families have healthy diets.

TSF recognizes that many people want to do good, but simply don't know how. The People's Project emphasizes initiatives that serve to combat this impediment to doing good. It is TSF's goal to help others learn how to help themselves, so that one day they may be capable of helping someone else in need.

== Recognition ==
In 2009 Tennessee's state legislature recognized both Stafford and The Stafford Foundation with a joint resolution honoring both for sponsoring the unprecedented People's Inaugural Project in January 2009. From Joint Resolution No. 58, sponsored by Representatives Karen Camper, Barbara Cooper and Joanne Favors and Senators Ophelia Ford, Beverly Marrero and Jim Kyle:

Earl W. Stafford and The Stafford Foundation have demonstrated a firm commitment to the principle of democratic inclusion, the idea that men and women from all walks of life should not only be tolerated but encouraged to participate in the civic life of the United States of America.

The N'Digo Foundation honored Stafford with the Lifetime Achievement in 2009 in recognition of his professional achievements and career contributions to making a positive impact in his community and throughout the country.

The Washington, D.C. chapter of the Association of Fundraising Professionals (AFP/DC) honored Stafford with the Outstanding Philanthropist Award during its National Capital Philanthropy Day celebration on November 20, 2009. He was nominated by the Venture Philanthropy Partners and was recognized for his contributions to making a positive impact in his community and throughout the country.

Stafford received the 2010 Horatio Alger Award from the Horatio Alger Association of Distinguished Americans, in recognition of his personal and professional success despite humble and challenging beginnings, and he was formally inducted into the association.

In 2010 the Salvation Army of Greater New York honored Stafford with its first "Stand Together" Award during its 62nd Annual Luncheon.

== Personal life ==
Stafford is married to Amanda Stafford (née Boardley), with whom he currently resides in McLean, Virginia. They have three children.
