= Wyoming National Bank of Casper =

Coordinates: 42.8504°N 106.3228°W

M Building
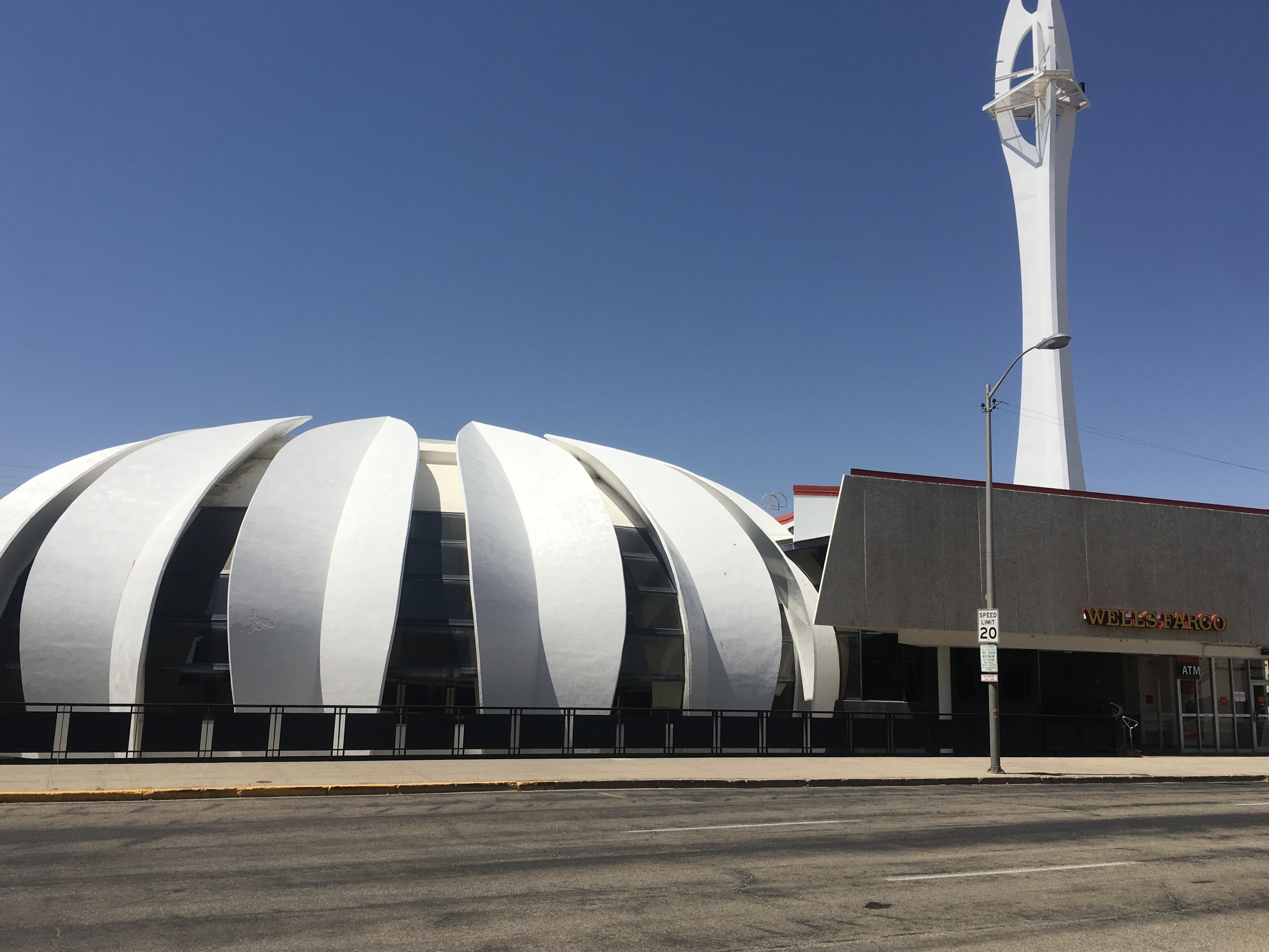
- The M Building pictured in summer of 2020 before its renovation.
- Interactive map of the M Building area
- Former names: Wyoming National Bank; Wells Fargo Bank

General information
- Type: Medical Offices, Event Space
- Architectural style: Modern (space age)
- Location: 234 East 1st Street, Casper, Wyoming, United States
- Current tenants: McGinley Clinic, McGinley Orthopedics, Events at The M, Elite Imaging Center, OrthoNOW Casper, Jen Galloway Health, Wind City Physical Therapy
- Construction started: 1963
- Completed: 1964 (building); 1968 (tower)
- Renovated: 2020

Height
- Height: 177 ft (54 m)

Dimensions
- Diameter: 94 ft (29 m)

Design and construction
- Architects: Charles Deaton (building); Harold Engstrom (tower)

The former Wyoming National Bank building, located in downtown Casper, opened its doors on May 3, 1964. The bank was built in the middle of an oil boom in Wyoming by architect Charles Deaton. Deaton's philosophy was to bring forth a "sculptural concept in architecture," his Mid-century modern style was the first of its kind for architecture in Wyoming. Upon completion, the building marked the 36th state Deaton had designed a bank in. Since opening, ownership has changed multiple times; in the mid-90s the building was purchased by Wells Fargo, which owned and operated a bank branch out of the building until 2020. Tri Opportunity Investment Group then purchased the property, and the building now houses McGinley Orthopedics and the McGinley Sports Medicine clinic.

== Architecture ==
The bank features a sculptured rotunda in the southeast corner of the two-story building. The rotunda is compiled of 17 rounded concrete blades, each weighing 21 tons and rising 44 feet tall. The concrete blades are separated with glass and steel panels. The blades function to support the dome and walls, designed to follow a sculptural appearance but functionable as working members of the structure. The interior of the rotunda, which is free of supporting columns, spans an 86-foot diameter at the ground level and slopes inward to a 60-foot diameter ceiling. The rotunda served as a two-floored main banking lobby with a domed ceiling, which held 20 teller booths in a circular pattern. The lighting in the dome was diffused with a plastic louver called a "squiggle" pattern which is made up of several thousand pieces but gives the appearance to be a smooth flow of curved lines, which was the first of its kind in the United States. The surrounding square box-like structure has a floating appearance, held off the ground by projecting beams on the north end, which served as the office space for the bank.

== Time-temperature pylon ==
Designed by Denver-based architect Harold Engstrom, the tower was erected in 1968. The time-temperature pylon rises 177 feet into the air, making it the world's tallest time-temperature display of the time. The pylon is firmly planted on three arching legs that come together a quarter of the way up then separate again at the top to hold the display on three sides. Each letter and number on the display were 8 feet tall. The original display on the pylon would flash a "WYO," "NATL," "BANK" message then the time and temperature. In 1992 the display was taken down and replaced with a sign for the current owner of the time, Norwest Bank. When Wells Fargo acquired the bank, the sign was replaced again to match the company. In 2017, the Wells Fargo signs were removed for structural reasons and the tower was planned to be demolished. Due to push back from the Casper community, demolition plans were halted, and the tower remains standing. Under ownership of McGinley Innovations, the tower will stay and has been kept bare.

== Renovations ==
Since taking over the building in 2020, McGinley Innovations has rehabilitated and renovated the bank to an Orthopedic clinic. The multi-million project involved asbestos removal, system upgrades, electrical and plumbing maintenance, the office areas have changed into clinic rooms and diagnostic centers, and the rotunda now doubles as a lobby and event venue space. The exterior paint has been restored to the original white of Deaton's design.
