= Sculptured House =

Historic house in Colorado, United States

- Deaton Sculptured House
- U.S. National Register of Historic Places
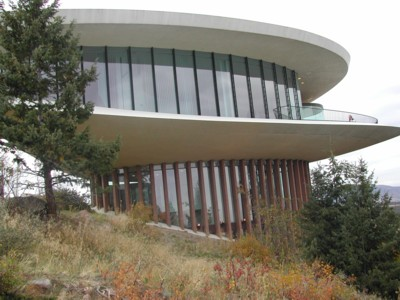

- Location within Colorado Location within the United States
- Location: Genesee Mountain, Jefferson County, Colorado, US
- Nearest city: Golden, Colorado
- Coordinates: 39°42′2″N 105°16′36″W
- Area: 15.3 acres (6.2 ha)
- Built: 1963
- Architect: Charles Deaton
- Architectural style: Modern Movement, Sculptural Expressionism
- NRHP reference No.: 02000385
- Added to NRHP: February 24, 2004

The Sculptured House, also known as the Sleeper House, is a distinctive elliptical curved house built in Genesee, Colorado, United States, on Genesee Mountain in 1963 by the architect Charles Deaton. It features prominently in the 1973 Woody Allen sci-fi comedy Sleeper.

== Background ==
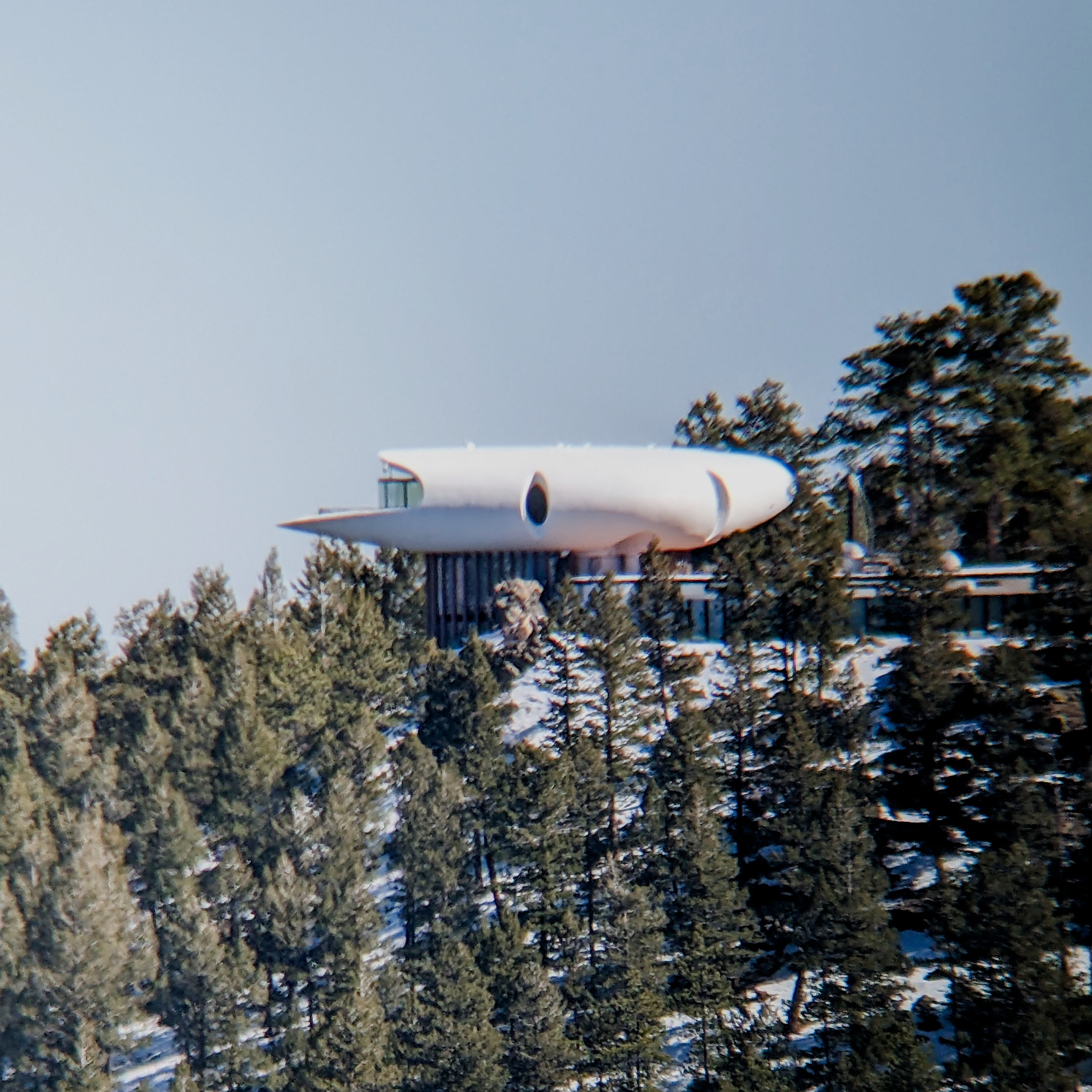
View of house from the west

Its architect Charles Deaton described his inspiration: "On Genesee Mountain I found a high point of land where I could stand and feel the great reaches of the Earth. I wanted the shape of it to sing an unencumbered song."

== Construction ==
The house was built in 1963. Delzell Inc., owned and operated by Clifford M. Delzell, was the original contractor, on an experimental permit. Deaton ran out of money before the house was finished, so he never lived in it.

The interior went largely unfinished and was vacant for almost three decades. Deaton died in 1996. In 1999, John Huggins, an entrepreneur and the former head of economic development for Denver, purchased the house. He built a large addition designed by Deaton with Nick Antonopoulos. Huggins commissioned Deaton's daughter Charlee to design the interior, and it was completed in 2003. The house covers 7,700 sq ft (720 m^{2}) over five levels, with five bedrooms and five bathrooms, along with a state of the art kitchen and top level master suite.

In 2006, Michael Dunahay, a Denver entrepreneur, purchased the house from Huggins. By late 2010, Dunahay had become delinquent on the nearly $2.8 million outstanding balance of his $3.1 million mortgage, and a foreclosure auction was held on November 10, 2010, where it sold for $1.5 million. The house was sold again in November 2010.

== In the media ==
- The 21st Century, episode "At Home, 2001" — hosted by Walter Cronkite (CBS, 1967)
- Sleeper (Woody Allen film, 1973)
- Livin' Large (MTV, 2003)
- American Guns (Discovery, 2011)
- Extreme Cribs (MTV, 2011)
- Home Strange Home (HGTV, 2012)

== See also ==
- National Register of Historic Places listings in Jefferson County, Colorado
