= Ross Perot Jr. =

American real estate developer and businessman

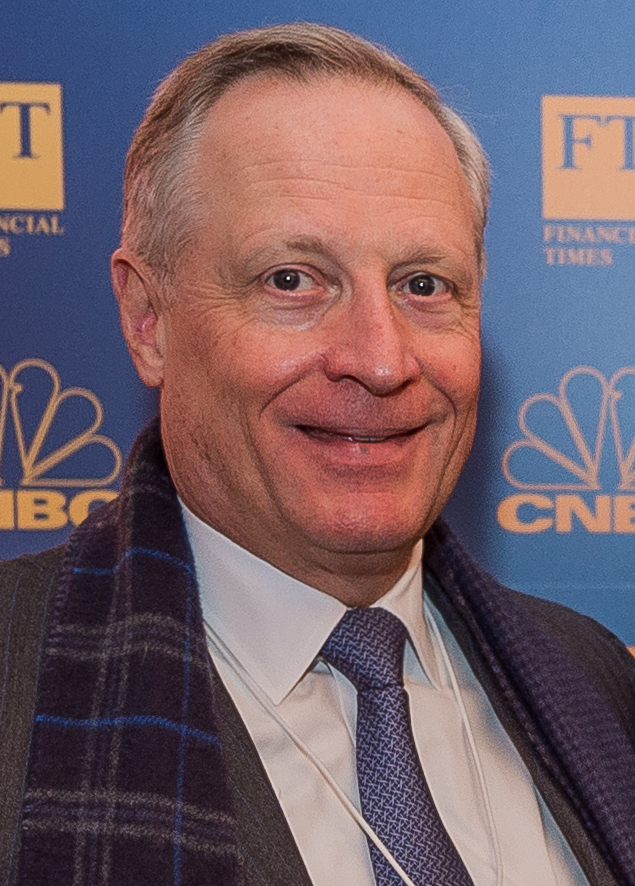
- Perot in 2018
- Born: Henry Ross Perot Jr. November 7, 1958 (age 68); Dallas, Texas, U.S.
- Education: Vanderbilt University (BA)
- Spouse: Sarah Perot
- Children: 4
- Relatives: Ross Perot (father)

Henry Ross Perot Jr. (born November 7, 1958) is an American real estate developer and businessman best known for his development of Alliance, Texas, an inland port near Fort Worth, and for making the first circumnavigation of the world in a helicopter, at age 23.

Perot chairs multiple companies, including The Perot Group and Hillwood. He is the eldest child of American billionaire businessman and former 1992 and 1996 U.S. presidential candidate Ross Perot.

== Early life and education ==
Perot was born and raised in Dallas, the son of Margot (née Birmingham) and Ross Perot. He graduated from St. Mark's School of Texas in 1977. After graduating from Vanderbilt University, he served in the United States Air Force for eight and a half years like his father .

== Career ==
In 1982, Perot co-piloted the first flight by helicopter around the world. Using a Bell 206 L-1 Long Ranger II, he completed the circumnavigation on September 30, 1982 after departing 29 days earlier on September 1.

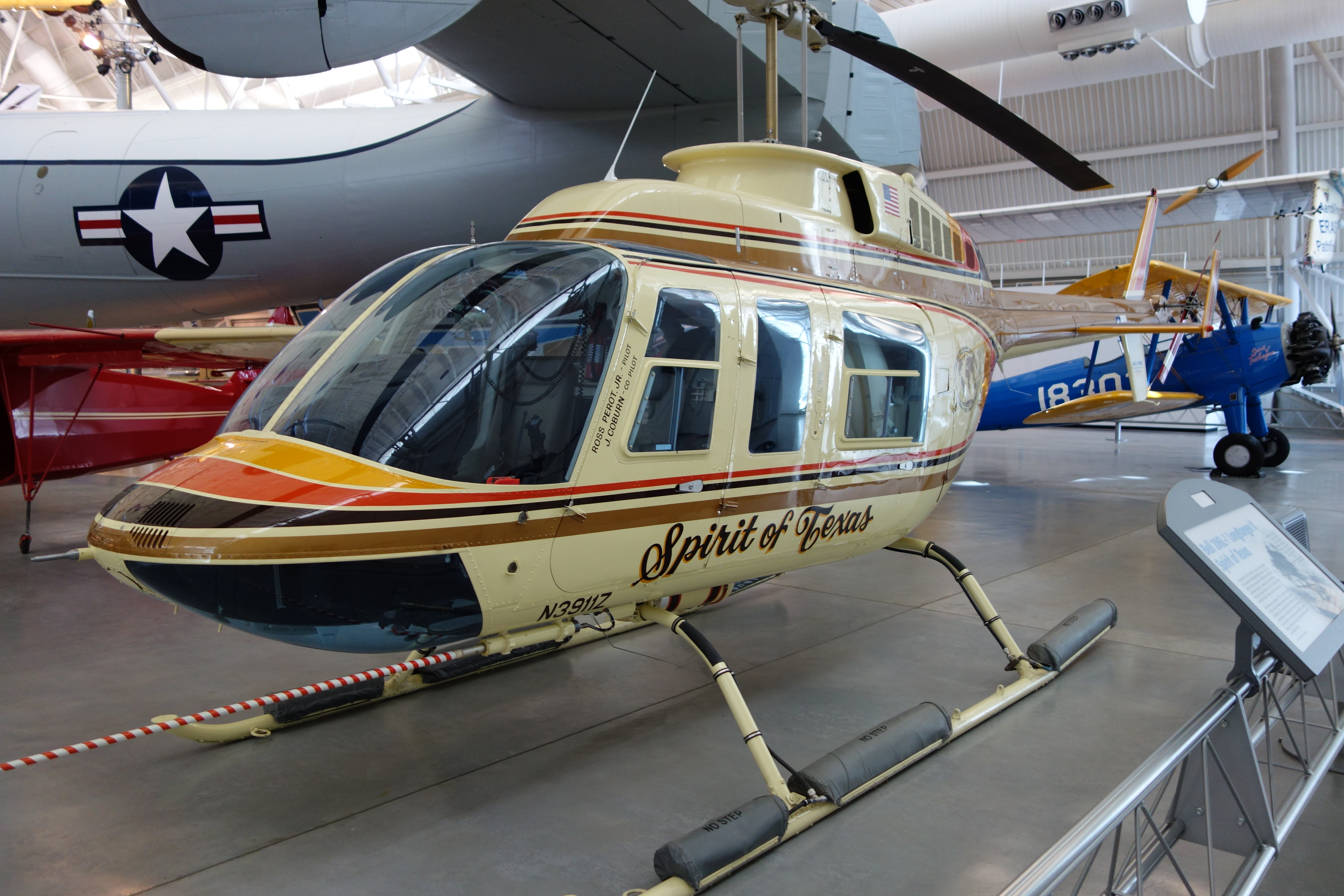
Spirit of Texas, a Bell 206 helicopter used to circumnavigate the globe. Currently on display at the Smithsonian National Air and Space Museum at Dulles International Airport

Perot chairs The Perot Group, which manages the Perot family's various interests, including real estate, oil and gas, and financial investments. He developed the Fort Worth Alliance Airport (Perot Field) and is a large real estate developer. Hillwood's residential division is building Harvest, a $1 billion, 1,150-acre development in Northlake and Argyle. Hillwood Communities recently kicked off developments including the 1006-acre development Pomona in Manvel and the 787-acre Union Park in Little Elm.

From 2002 to 2003, Perot chaired the Texas Governor's Task Force for Economic Growth. In March 2007, presidential candidate Mitt Romney, seeking the Republican Party nomination, selected Perot as a member of his Texas finance committee.

Perot was a member of the board of directors for Dell Inc. He is a board member of Guide IT. He chairs the United States Air Force Memorial Foundation and co-chairs the EastWest Institute. He also sits on the board of trustees of St. Mark's School of Texas, Southern Methodist University, and Vanderbilt University. For 2024 Forbes reported Perot's net worth at $3.7 billion. Perot was the 1983 recipient of the Langley Gold Medal from the Smithsonian Institution.

In April 2020, Governor Greg Abbott named Perot to the Strike Force to Open Texas, a group "tasked with finding safe and effective ways to slowly reopen the state" during the COVID-19 pandemic.

=== Dallas Mavericks ownership ===
Perot purchased the Dallas Mavericks NBA basketball team from original owner Don Carter in March 1996. During his four-year tenure, the Mavericks made no more progress on the court than they had in Carter's final seasons and nowhere near what they did under his successor, Mark Cuban. It was said that he was a basketball novice, or uninterested in the sport, and was using his position as team owner to front his projects, most notably Victory Park, which was anchored by the American Airlines Center, which opened in 2001. He sold the team to Cuban in January 2000 and the franchise did not have a losing record in any of the next 15 seasons, winning two Western Conference championships and the 2011 NBA championship.

In May 2010, Perot, who retained 5% ownership, sued Cuban, alleging the franchise was insolvent or in imminent danger of insolvency. In June 2010, Cuban responded in a court filing maintaining Perot was wrongly seeking money to offset $100 million (~$144 million in 2025) in losses on the Victory Park real estate development. The lawsuit was dismissed in 2011 by Judge Craig Smith (a Dallas County State District Judge), due in part to Cuban asserting proper management of the team due to its recent victory in the 2011 NBA Finals. The judge did note that the team had won the 2011 NBA championship during the proceedings. In 2014, the Fifth Court of Appeals in Texas affirmed the dismissal on appeal. After his initial defeat, Perot attempted to prevent Mavericks fans from using the parking lots he controlled near the American Airlines Center. Perot retains a minority stake in the team, as does Carter's estate.

=== Major League Cricket ownership ===
In 2023, it was announced that Perot was one of the owners of Major League Cricket team Texas Super Kings.

== Political activity ==
Perot contributed $660,000 to Donald Trump's 2020 presidential campaign.

During the 2024 Republican Party presidential primaries, Perot endorsed former U.S. ambassador to the U.N. Nikki Haley. Perot and Harlan Crow worked together to raise money in Texas for the Haley campaign.

In 2026, Perot and his wife contributed over $2 million to Grow the Majority, the joint fundraising committee for congressional Republicans.

== Honors ==
- In 1982, President Ronald Reagan presented Perot with the Gold Medal Award for Extraordinary Service.
- In 1983, Perot received the Golden Plate Award of the American Academy of Achievement.
- In 2007, Perot received the Woodrow Wilson Award for Corporate Citizenship.
- In 2007, Perot received the Secretary of Defense Medal for Outstanding Public Service.
- In 2008, Perot and his father, H. Ross Perot, jointly received the H. Neil Mallon Award presented by the World Affairs Council - Dallas/Fort Worth.
- In 2012, Perot was inducted into the Texas Transportation Hall of Honor.
- In 2019, the National Business Aviation Association (NBAA) gave Perot its 2019 Meritorious Service to Aviation Award.
- In 2020, Perot received the J. Erik Jonsson Ethics Award from Southern Methodist University.
- In 2022, the National Eagle Scout Association awarded him the Distinguished Eagle Scout Award.

== See also ==
- Notable alumni of St. Mark's School of Texas

Sporting positions
| Preceded by Donald Carter | Dallas Mavericks owner 1996–2000 | Succeeded by Mark Cuban |
