= Rose Cook Small =

Rose Cook Small (1912–1996) was a businesswoman who built Bluebird Foods Inc. into the largest meat-processing business in the United States.

Rose Small was born and raised in Camden, New Jersey, one of six children. She sold produce on the street as a child to help support her family, and she dropped out of school before finishing the tenth grade.

She married Harry Cook at age 16. In 1933, when she was 21 years old, she and her husband opened a meat market. The business was a success, and the couple opened a second store and a meatpacking house in 1936. The new store was destroyed by fire in 1937, and Cook used her engagement and wedding rings as collateral for a loan to rebuild it. With the loan, the couple established Bluebird, Inc., and reopened the store in 1940. Her husband died in 1950, and Rose continued to operate the business, learning all facets of meatpacking and meat processing.

She remarried in 1960, taking the name of Small. By 1963, Bluebird had moved to a larger facility. The company went public in 1968, by which time it was shipping two million pounds of meat per week. Over the following decade, Small acquired three more meat packing businesses, making Bluebird the largest meat-processing business in the United States. Companies acquired or owned by Bluebird included Mid-South Packers, Agar Packing Company, Patrick Cudahy Packing Company, and DAK, Inc. In 1980 she sold the business and retired.

In 1973, Fortune listed Small as one of just 11 women among the United States' 6,500 highest-paid corporate officers and directors, then defined by an annual pay level of $30,000 or more. She was a 1977 recipient of the Horatio Alger Award of the Horatio Alger Association of Distinguished Americans.

In response to receiving the award, she said, "It was an honor to be selected for this prestigious award. Starting a business and making it work isn't easy, but with hard work and dedication, I believe anything can be accomplished. My award is the physical symbol of how I made my dream come true."
