= Carl Westcott =

American businessman

Carl Westcott (born 1939, Vicksburg, Mississippi) is an American entrepreneur and the founder of several companies including First Extended Service Corporation, and Westcott Communications.

He lives in Dallas. His son Court is married to Kameron Westcott, who appeared on seasons 2-5 of The Real Housewives of Dallas on the Bravo network. Carl Westcott was also suffering with Huntington's disease.

== Businesses ==
After leaving the army, Westcott moved to California and got a job in car sales. In 1967, he bought a car dealership and by 1979 Westcott owned 17 dealerships across the nation. Westcott Communications was sold in 1996 for $422 million to K-III Communications (now Rent Group). He also served as Chairman of Westcott LLC and General Partner of Commodore Partners, a real estate development and holding company.

== Awards ==
Westcott has received several awards including the Arthur M. Young Society, Entrepreneur of the Year Award in 1988 and the Horatio Alger Award from the Horatio Alger Association of Distinguished Americans in 2003.
