= Federated Mutual Insurance Company =

American insurance company

- Type: Mutual
- Industry: Insurance
- Founded: 1904; 122 years ago Owatonna, Minnesota, U.S.
- Number of locations: 48 states
- Area served: United States
- Key people: Nicholas Lower (Chairman)
- Products: Property & Casualty Insurance
- Number of employees: About 3,000 (2026)
- Website: federatedinsurance.com

Federated Mutual Insurance Company (Federated) is an American insurance company that is the direct writer of property, casualty, life, disability income, surety, and workers compensation insurance products with headquarters in Owatonna, Minnesota. As of 2026, the Company had approximately 3,000 employees and operated in 48 states, with several service offices located throughout the country. Federated has an A. M. Best credit rating of "A+ (Superior)."

== History ==
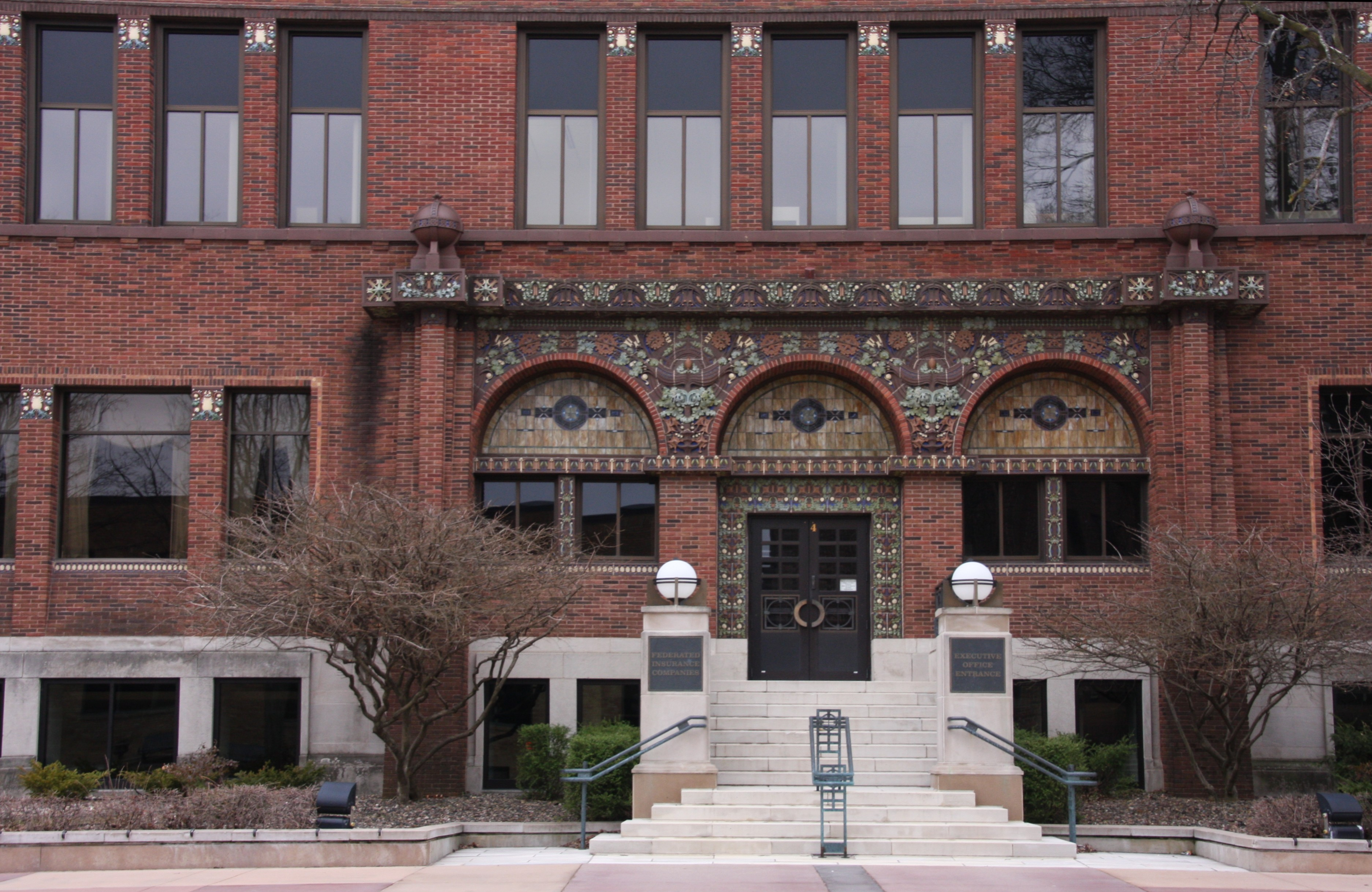
Entrance to the Federated Mutual Insurance Company Executive Office Building in Owatonna, Minnesota

During the 1890s, the retail implement dealers in Minnesota formed an association, which proved to be very successful. In 1904, these dealers decided to try to reduce their insurance costs by organizing their own insurance company.

Initially, the company was known as the Minnesota Implement Mutual Fire Insurance Company, and retained this name for many years. They would later become the Mutual Implement and Hardware Insurance Company, then Federated Mutual Implement and Hardware Insurance Company and, finally, Federated Mutual Insurance Company ("Federated Mutual").

On January 1, 1948, Federated Mutual entered the casualty insurance field, and was one of the first major insurance companies to write both fire and casualty insurance. In November 1949, accident and health coverage was added, with group accident and health insurance being written for various trade associations and employer groups. Federated Life Insurance Company (or "Federated Life") was organized in January 1959.

== Products and services ==
List of products and services offered by Federated Mutual Insurance Company:

- Commercial property and casualty insurance
- Life and disability insurance
- Risk management and loss prevention resources
- Workers compensation insurance
- Bonding
- Estate planning and financial services

Federated Mutual once offered group health insurance, but ceased this offering at the end of 2017.

== Industries ==
List of industries Federated Mutual Insurance Company insures:

- Auto dealers and auto parts wholesalers
- Contractors (building materials, hardware, electrical, plumbing-heating-cooling, specialized)
- Equipment dealers (agricultural, lawn and garden, construction)
- Funeral services
- Jewelry retailers
- Manufacturing and machine shop
- Petroleum marketers and convenience stores
- Printers
- Tire dealers
- Custom cabinet and woodworkers
- Grocery
- Wholesale/Retail operations
- Building material dealers

== Canadian History ==
Federated Mutual is not associated with Federated Insurance Company of Canada
