= Sleeper (1973 film) =

1973 science fiction comedy film by Woody Allen

- Theatrical release poster by Robert McGinnis
- Directed by: Woody Allen
- Written by: Woody Allen; Marshall Brickman
- Produced by: Jack Grossberg
- Starring: Woody Allen; Diane Keaton
- Cinematography: David M. Walsh
- Edited by: Ralph Rosenblum; Ron Kalish; O. Nicholas Brown
- Music by: Woody Allen
- Production company: Jack Rollins–Charles H. Joffe Productions
- Distributed by: United Artists
- Release date: December 17, 1973
- Running time: 87 minutes
- Country: United States
- Language: English
- Budget: $2 million
- Box office: $18.3 million

Sleeper is a 1973 American science fiction comedy film directed by and starring Woody Allen, who co-wrote it with Marshall Brickman. Parodying a dystopic future of the United States in 2173, the film involves the misadventures of the owner of a health food store who is cryogenically frozen in 1973 and defrosted 200 years later in an ineptly led police state. Contemporary politics and pop culture are satirized throughout the film, which includes tributes to the classic comedy of Buster Keaton, Harold Lloyd, and Charlie Chaplin. Many elements of notable works of science fiction are also paid tribute to, or parodied.

== Plot ==
Miles Monroe is a jazz musician and owner of the Happy Carrot health-food store in New York City's Greenwich Village. He walks into the hospital in 1973 for a routine ulcer operation that goes wrong, leaving him relegated to 200 years of anonymous cryopreservation. Two scientists in 2173 illegally revive him. They are members of an underground rebellion at odds with the police state the United States had become after the massive destruction caused when "a man named Albert Shanker got a hold of a nuclear warhead." It is ostensibly ruled by a dictator known only as "The Leader", and about to implement a secret plan known as the "Aries Project". The rebels hope to use Miles as a spy to infiltrate and derail it, as he is the only member of the dystopian society without a known biometric identity.

The authorities grow suspicious and arrive in force to question the scientists, who are arrested and taken to have their brains "electronically simplified". Miles escapes by disguising himself as a robot, which is then randomly delivered to work in the home of idle socialite Luna Schlosser. When Luna decides to have her new butler's rather unattractive head replaced with something more "aesthetically pleasing", Miles reveals his true identity. Spooked at his disclosure and unsympathetic to the rebels, she threatens to turn him in to the authorities. In response, Miles kidnaps her and goes on the run, searching for the Aries Project.

After much bickering, Miles and Luna fall in love. Miles is captured and brainwashed into becoming a complacent member of society, while Luna escapes and joins the rebellion. The rebels kidnap Miles and perform successful reverse-brainwashing. Miles falls into the routine of rebel life, but grows jealous when he catches Luna kissing the handsome, hunky rebel leader, Erno Windt, and she announces that she has come to believe in free love.

Miles tries to win Luna back. Eventually, he and Luna infiltrate the Aries Project, wherein they quickly learn that the national Leader had been killed by a rebel bomb ten months previously. All that survives is his nose. Miles and Luna disguise themselves as doctors, resulting in a case of mistaken identity, causing them to be placed in charge of cloning the Leader from his sole remaining part. Miles steals the nose and deadends the government's cloning scheme by dropping the nose in the path of a road roller.

The pair escape, and later debate their future together. Miles tells Luna that Erno will inevitably become as corrupt as the Leader, as that is how all revolutions end up. Miles and Luna confess their love for one another, but she claims that science has proven men and women cannot have meaningful relationships due to chemical incompatibilities. Miles dismisses this theory, declaring that he does not believe in science. Luna then points out that he does not believe in God or political systems either, and asks if there is anything he does believe in. He responds, "Sex and death—two things that come once in a lifetime. But at least after death, you're not nauseous." The two embrace and kiss.

== Cast ==
- Woody Allen as Miles Monroe, the former owner of a health food store from the 1970s
- Diane Keaton as Luna Schlosser, an artist from the 22nd century
- John Beck as Erno Windt, the Leader of the rebellion
- Mary Gregory and Bartlett Robinson as Dr. Melik and Dr. Orva, respectively, the scientists who oversee Miles's rehabilitation from cryosleep; both are captured by the government and taken away
- Don Keefer as Dr. Tryon, one of the scientists who oversee Miles's rehabilitation from cryosleep
- Mews Small as Dr. Nero, one of the scientists who oversee Miles's rehabilitation from cryosleep
- Peter Hobbs as Dr. Dean

The image of Timothy Leary is used for Our Leader.

== Production ==
Much of the film was shot in and around Denver, Colorado. The outdoor shots of the hospital were filmed at the Mesa Laboratory of the National Center for Atmospheric Research in Boulder, Colorado. There is a brief shot of the main building of the Denver Botanic Gardens and of the concrete lamp posts. Other scenes were filmed in Los Angeles, Monterey and at the Culver City Studios.

The Sculptured House, designed by architect Charles Deaton, is a private home located on Genesee Mountain near Genesee Park, west of Denver. The Mile Hi Church of Religious Science in Lakewood, Colorado, was turned into a futuristic McDonald's, featuring a sign counting the number sold: 795 followed by 51 zeroes.

Author Christopher Turner has suggested that the orgasmatron, the electromechanical device that Monroe encounters, was a parody of Wilhelm Reich's orgone accumulator.

Science fiction author Ben Bova was an uncredited science advisor to the film.

== Reception ==
Sleeper opened at the Coronet and Little Carnegie theatres in New York City on December 17, 1973. It received positive reviews. On Rotten Tomatoes the film has a 100% approval rating based on 38 reviews, with an average rating of 8.2/10. The site's critical consensus reads, "In Sleeper, Woody Allen's madcap futurist comedy, practically each joke and one-liner hits its target."

Vincent Canby, in The New York Times, called the film "terrific", saying it

confidently advances the Allen art into slapstick territory that I associate with the best of Laurel and Hardy. It's the kind of film comedy that no one in Hollywood has done with style in many years, certainly not since Jerry Lewis began to take himself seriously. Sleeper is a comic epic that recalls the breathless pace and dizzy logic of the old two-reelers.

Roger Ebert gave the film 3 1/2 out of four stars, saying Allen "gives us moments in Sleeper that are as good as anything since the silent films of Buster Keaton."

Pauline Kael for The New Yorker wrote that it was the "slapstick comedy of the year" and that it is the most "stable and sustained" of Allen's films.

== Soundtrack ==
The movie's rapid pace and often slapstick action is mirrored by a lively soundtrack composed heavily of Dixieland-style jazz, much of it performed by members of the Preservation Hall Jazz Band. Allen, an amateur clarinetist with a regular weekly gig as a member of the "Ragtime Rascals" at Michael's Pub in midtown Manhattan, sat in with the Band. The New Orleans Funeral and Ragtime Orchestra was also featured. Additional recording was done at Michael's.

== Accolades ==
In 1973, the film was awarded the Hugo Award for Best Dramatic Presentation at Discon II, the 32nd World Science Fiction Convention, in Washington, D.C.

In 2000, readers of Total Film magazine voted Sleeper the 30th Greatest Comedy Film of All Time.

In 2000, American Film Institute included the film on its list AFI's 100 Years...100 Laughs at number 80.

In October 2013, the film was voted by readers of the UK's The Guardian as the tenth best film directed by Allen.

== Film as tribute ==
Aspects of the film's storyline are similar to the plot of the 1910 H. G. Wells novel The Sleeper Awakes.

In 1001 Movies You Must See Before You Die, Kim Newman writes that Sleeper's "vision of the future [is] informed by films like 2001: A Space Odyssey (1968), A Clockwork Orange (1971), THX 1138 (1971), and Z.P.G. (1972)."

The anthem sung by the rebels ("Rebels are we, ...") is the same as the one sung by the guerrillas in Allen's 1971 film Bananas.

In a 2007 interview, Allen stated that Sleeper was made as a tribute to comedian Bob Hope, whom he deeply admired.

== See also ==
- List of American films of 1973
- List of films with a 100% rating on Rotten Tomatoes
