= Faena Hotel Miami Beach =

Hotel in Miami Beach, Florida, United States

Coordinates: 25.807329°N 80.123034°W

The Faena Hotel Miami Beach is a historic resort hotel located at 3201 Collins Avenue Miami Beach.

== History ==
The Saxony Hotel, completed in 1948, was one of the first luxury resorts on Miami Beach. Following the success of the Saxony, other hotels emerged on the opulent beach front. The hotel was designed by architect Roy F. France and built and owned by George D. Sax. George Sax was perhaps best known as the president and chairman of Chicago's Exchange International Corporation and Exchange National Bank. He was also president of Sax Enterprises, Inc. Today, Sax is recognized for his contributions to the banking industry, being credited with the innovation of drive-through banking and instant loans.

The Saxony was famous for its luxurious rooms, complimentary meals, restaurants and exceptional views of South Beach. It was the first air-conditioned hotel on Miami Beach, and was considered the most expensive and lavish resort of the time. When the hotel first opened, each room was estimated to have cost approximately $21,000, which at the time was thought to be the largest sum of money ever paid for such a project. The rooms featured decks that could accommodate large groups. It was nicknamed the "Ivory Tower" after the nightclub on its top floor. Features of the hotel included decks that could accommodate large groups, an Olympic-sized swimming pool, a 600-foot private beach, and two all-weather tennis courts.

Currently it is owned by Faena Group which extensively renovated the hotel. as the Faena Hotel Miami Beach, which opened in November 2015.

== See also ==
- Casa Faena, a hotel at 3500 Collins Avenue
