= The Stafford Foundation =

American philanthropic foundation

- Formation: 2002
- Type: Nonprofit organization
- Headquarters: Reston, VA, United States
- Chairman: Earl W. Stafford
- Revenue: $64,954 (2015)
- Expenses: $143,549 (2015)
- Website: thestaffordfoundation.org

The Stafford Foundation (TSF) is a non-profit organization which "furthers the cause of Jesus Christ by investing in education and training to empower the underserved to do good." The foundation collaborates with and invests in capacity-building efforts that equip the underserved through programs that provide health, education, training and faith-based mission support. The organization was founded in 2002 and is based in Reston, Virginia.

The Stafford Foundation is best known for its People's Inaugural Project which brought 300 disadvantaged individuals from across America to Washington, D.C. to celebrate the historic presidential inauguration of Barack Obama. Founder Earl W. Stafford spent over $1 Million of his own money to fund the effort.

The foundation recently launched The People's Project, which continues to build on the goodwill established by the People's Inaugural Project. In 2010, TSF also announced its "Doing Good" campaign, with spokesperson Bill Cosby, as an effort provide people with the information and resources, they need to help make a difference by doing good for others in need.

== Earl W. Stafford, founder ==
2010 Horatio Alger Award winner Earl W. Stafford is the founder and chairman of The Stafford Foundation. Stafford is also the founding chairman and CEO of The Wentworth Group, also based in Reston. Until January 2008, he was chairman and CEO of UNITECH, Inc., which he founded in 1988. Stafford also had a 20-year distinguished career in the U.S. military that included service as the assistant Air Force Liaison Officer to the Federal Aviation Administration. In addition to his work with TSF, Stafford currently serves on the Boards of the Joint Center for Political and Economic Studies, Drexel University, Wesley Theological Seminary, Venture Philanthropy Partners, and Business Executives for National Security.

== The People's Inaugural Project ==
In the spring of 2008, founder Earl Stafford felt compelled to do something special for local underprivileged Americans during the 2009 presidential inauguration festivities. His initial idea was to host an inaugural event at a Washington, D.C. hotel suite for those who would otherwise not be able to attend. At the time, he imagined it would be a simple gathering of fifty to sixty locally, disadvantaged individuals. In October 2008, Stafford read an article about extravagant hotel packages being sold in the area and thought to rent the ultimate inaugural hotel package and include hundreds of disadvantaged Americans from across the country to participate in a three-day celebration of the incoming president. Days later, Stafford and TSF anonymously purchased the JW Marriott's premier $1 Million inaugural package, which included hundreds of hotel rooms, use of their grand ballroom, and access to the 12th floor terrace overlooking Pennsylvania Avenue and the inaugural parade route.

On December 4, the Washington Post featured a front-page story about Stafford and his plans to reader. Word quickly spread about Stafford's extraordinary gesture, and within an instant he became known as "The Benefactor of the Ball.". From the onset, media organizations and people from across the globe became captivated by the Stafford Foundation's plans. On the same day that the Washington Post launched their story, the Stafford Foundation was featured in a three-minute story on ABC World News Tonight with Charlie Gibson. The next morning, Mr. Stafford appeared on the CNN, CBS, and ABC morning programs, and an editorial about the events appeared in the New York Times. Over the next several weeks, the People's Inaugural Project and TSF continued to gain in popularity and recognition. Stafford was featured in several media outlets, including the major national television news organizations, magazines, popular radio shows, local newspapers from across the globe, and on Oprah.

Hundreds of non-profit groups asked to send qualified individuals to the events, including the Boys and Girls Clubs of America, the National Urban League, and the US Army's Wounded Warrior program. Beauticians, manicurists, and stylists from across the Washington region offered their services free of charge during the events to help prepare the disadvantaged guests for such a glamorous affair. After one month of announcing their plans, more than 500 gowns and tuxedos were donated to the disadvantaged guests from a variety of individuals.

On Sunday, January 18, 2009, the People's Inaugural Project was held. More than two thousand individuals attended the various events; over 300 disadvantaged guests were lodged in rooms at the JW Marriott; and a boutique featuring the collected gowns, tuxedos, shoes, and accessories was built at the JW Marriott. The three-day event included a thousand-person Prayer Breakfast, which featured religious leaders from a variety of faiths and a performance by First Lady of Gospel Shirley Caesar; a thousand-person Martin Luther King Luncheon, which featured a keynote speech by Martin Luther King III and a performance by students of the Ron Clark Academy; an inaugural parade viewing from the Marriott's 12th Floor Terrace; the main inaugural ball, which featured a performance by legendary jazz singer Jean Carne; and the youth balls that were held on the 12th floor terrace. Letters of welcome were also issued by both President-Elect Barack Obama and Mayor Adrian Fenty.

== The People's Project ==
Since the People's Inaugural Project, The Stafford Foundation has continued its investment in underserved people through continued outreach. The Peoples' Project 2010 national initiative, launched with the assistance of Bill Cosby focused on "Doing Good". The People's Project encompasses initiatives through grants that support programs with viable nonprofits groups aligned with TSF's mission. Since the fall of 2009, TSF has supported the work of 30 organizations with grants totaling more than $1 Million. These groups provide programs that include homeless shelters that provide job training and a facility that provides employment to the severely disabled.

== The Doing Good campaign ==
In January 2010, The Stafford Foundation (TSF) launched a national movement to motivate people to help others in need by Doing Good. The Doing Good campaign is based on a simple principle: to help those in need become self-reliant so that they will in turn be inspired to help others. The effort focuses on ways to help people with job-training, health and wellness, and mission-based support. The campaign will result in bringing support and services to people in need to help them become self-sufficient and live in dignity. The impact ranges from supporting women's homeless shelters that also provide job training to helping low-income families have healthy diets.

== See also ==
- Huffington Post Article -- Earl Stafford Invites the Disadvantaged
- "The Benefactor of the Ball” Washington Post, December 4, 2008.
