= Walco Bead Co. =

Bead company

Indian Head Logo

Walco Bead Co. was one of the largest bead companies in the United States of America, Africa, China, and Canada at the start of the 1900s. It was a landmark in New York's "bead alley" at 37 West 37th Street.

== Overview ==
Walco's technique in marketing was to manufacture bead kits to encourage adults and children to make projects. Many styles of these kits were available, mainly Native American beading belts. During the Great Depression, beads were an inexpensive, and bead crafting was a time-consuming hobby that produced beautiful results. These kits included beads, a bead loom, string, and instructions.

In the 1930s, with the addition of the "Official Boy Scout Beadcraft Outfit", all kits came with fully illustrated, easy-to-read instructions.

In the 1950s, Walco introduced jewelry kits and larger "Bead Embroidery Kits". These were designed for women to customize their clothes - their sweaters, blouses, dresses, scarves, stoles, and jackets. These kits were sold as complete kits and patterns were available separately.

By the early 1970s, Walco manufactured many other kits, like Li'l Missy Beaded Dolls, MS Beaded Doll Kits, Christmas Beaded Ornaments, Ming Tree Kits, Beaded Vegetable Kits, DO-IT-YOURSELF Beaded Fruit, and Easter Egg Ornament Kits.

Some time around 1976, the Walco Beaded Company changed hands to the Holiday Company.

== See also ==
- Bead
- Beadwork
- Glass beadmaking
