= Genesee, Colorado =

Census-designated place in Jefferson County, CO, USA

- Census-designated place
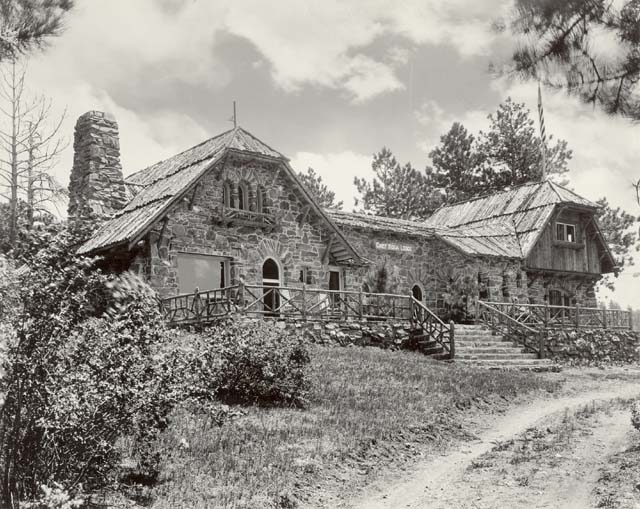
- Chief Hosa Lodge, Genesee Mountain Park, built in 1917.

- Location of the Genesee CDP in Jefferson County, Colorado
- Coordinates: 39°41′16″N 105°15′23″W
- Country: United States
- State: Colorado
- County: Jefferson County

Government
  - Type: unincorporated community

Area
  - Total: 6.663 sq mi (17.257 km^{2})
  - Land: 6.657 sq mi (17.242 km^{2})
  - Water: 0.0058 sq mi (0.015 km^{2})
- Elevation: 7,733 ft (2,357 m)

Population (2020)
  - Total: 3,610
  - Density: 542/sq mi (209/km^{2})
- Time zone: UTC-7 (MST)
  - Summer (DST): UTC-6 (MDT)
- ZIP Code: Golden 80401
- Area codes: 303 & 720
- GNIS feature ID: 2408287

Genesee is an unincorporated community and a census-designated place (CDP) located in and governed by Jefferson County, Colorado, United States. The CDP is a part of the Denver–Aurora–Lakewood, CO Metropolitan Statistical Area. The population of the Genesee CDP was 3,610 at the United States Census 2020. The Golden post office (Zip code 80401) serves the area.

== Geography ==
Genesse is located in the foothills of the Front Range.

The Genesee CDP has an area of 4,264 acres (17.257 km^{2}), including 3.7 acres (0.015 km^{2}) of water.

== Demographics ==
The United States Census Bureau initially defined the Genesee CDP for the 1990 United States census.

Genesee CDP, Colorado
Year	Pop.	±%
1990	2,737	—
2000	3,699	+35.1%
2010	3,609	−2.4%
2020	3,610	+0.0%
Source: United States Census Bureau

=== 2020 census ===
As of the 2020 census, Genesee had a population of 3,610. The median age was 54.2 years. 17.1% of residents were under the age of 18 and 29.7% of residents were 65 years of age or older. For every 100 females there were 100.8 males, and for every 100 females age 18 and over there were 100.5 males age 18 and over.

0.0% of residents lived in urban areas, while 100.0% lived in rural areas.

There were 1,532 households in Genesee, of which 22.7% had children under the age of 18 living in them. Of all households, 67.8% were married-couple households, 14.2% were households with a male householder and no spouse or partner present, and 14.2% were households with a female householder and no spouse or partner present. About 20.8% of all households were made up of individuals and 11.4% had someone living alone who was 65 years of age or older.

There were 1,634 housing units, of which 6.2% were vacant. The homeowner vacancy rate was 0.6% and the rental vacancy rate was 4.2%.

Racial composition as of the 2020 census
Race	Number	Percent
White	3,239	89.7%
Black or African American	10	0.3%
American Indian and Alaska Native	13	0.4%
Asian	99	2.7%
Native Hawaiian and Other Pacific Islander	0	0.0%
Some other race	23	0.6%
Two or more races	226	6.3%
Hispanic or Latino (of any race)	157	4.3%

== Attractions ==
- Genesee Park, in the Denver Mountain Parks system.
- Buffalo Overlook - Home of Bison herd that is owned/maintained by the Denver Parks and Recreation in Genesee Park.

== Education ==
Genesee is served by the Jefferson County Public Schools.

== See also ==
- Front Range Urban Corridor
