= Mary Kay =

American multi-level marketing company

Mary Kay Inc.
- Type: Private
- Industry: Multi-level marketing
- Founded: September 13, 1963; 63 years ago Dallas, Texas, U.S.
- Headquarters: Addison, Texas, U.S.
- Key people: Richard R. Rogers, Executive Chairman; David Holl, Chairman; Ryan Rogers, CEO; Deborah Gibbins, Chief Financial Officer
- Products: Cosmetics, skin care
- Revenue: US$2.7 billion (2022)
- Number of employees: Staff 5,000; Salespeople 3.5 million worldwide (2015)
- Website: www.marykay.com

Mary Kay Inc. is an American privately owned multi-level marketing company. Mary Kay is based in Addison, Texas. The company was founded by Mary Kay Ash in 1963. Richard Rogers, Ash's son, is the chairman, and Ryan Rogers, Ash's grandson, was named CEO in 2022.

== History ==
=== Foundation–2000 ===
In 1963, Mary Kay Ash founded the company based on a line of cosmetics she had been wearing for several years. She purchased the formula from a woman who had been selling it privately. Originally the company had 318 consultants and sales of $198,154. By 1991, it exceeded $500 million in sales through 220,000 consultants. In 1995, its sales had grown to $950 million.

=== 2001–present ===
Founder Mary Kay Ash died on November 22, 2001. In March 2020, the company closed operation in Australia and New Zealand. In November 2022, David Holl, the company’s CEO since 2006, retired after nearly 30 years with the company but remained chairman of the board. In November 2022, Ryan Rogers was named CEO.

== Business model ==
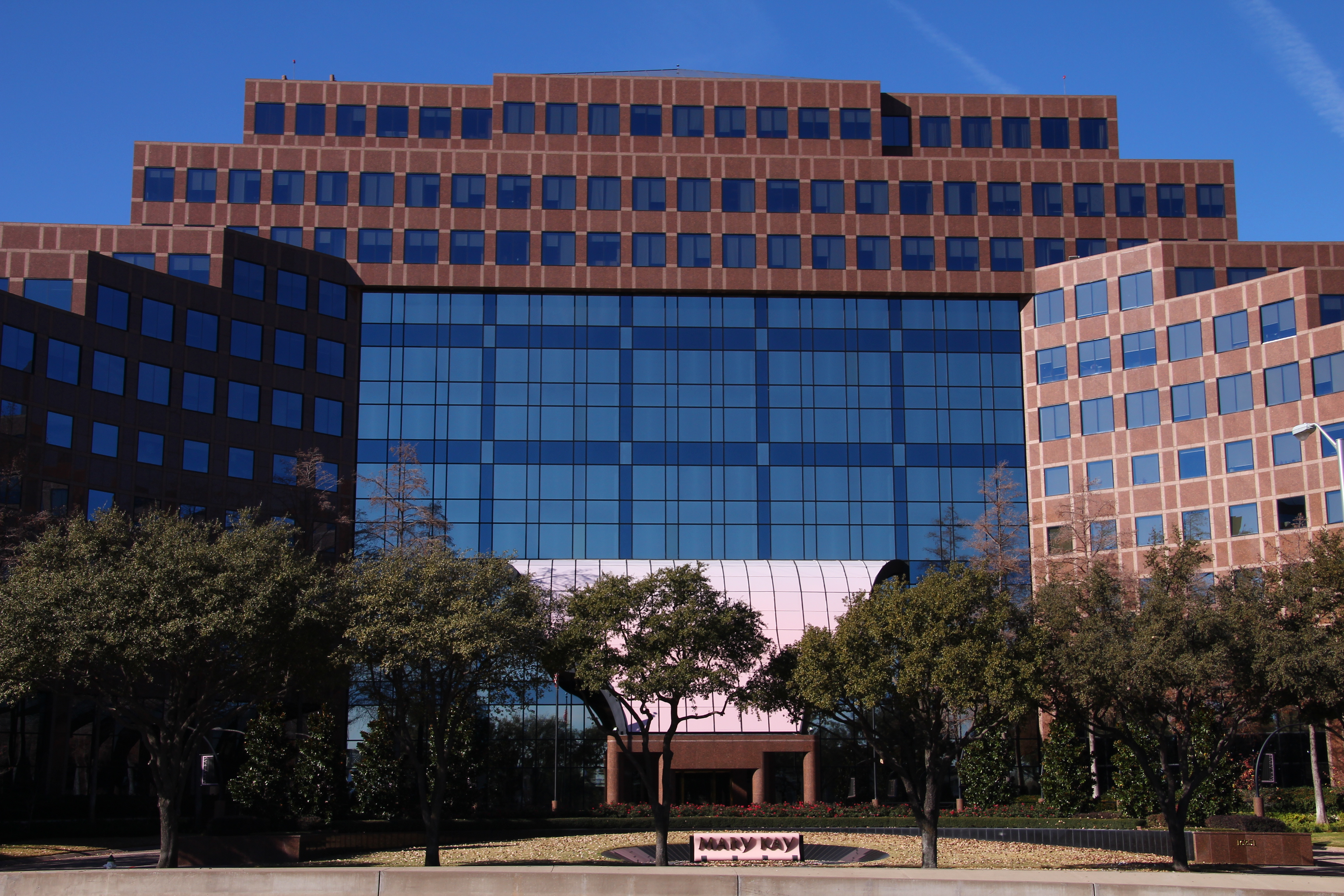
Mary Kay corporate headquarters in Addison, Texas

Mary Kay sells cosmetics through a direct marketing model. Mary Kay consultants, called beauty consultants, can make income by directly selling to people in their community, and also receive a commission when they recruit others to begin selling under their distribution network. Mary Kay releases few details about the average income of its sellers.

=== Manufacturing plants ===
The company's primary manufacturing plant is in Dallas, Texas. A second plant was opened in Hangzhou, China, to manufacture and package products for that market. A third plant was opened in 1997, in La Chaux-de-Fonds, Switzerland for the European market. The Swiss plant closed in 2003.

== Cars ==
In 1968, Mary Kay Ash purchased the first pink Cadillac from a Dallas dealership, where it was repainted on site to match the "Mountain Laurel Blush" in a compact Ash carried. The Cadillac served as a mobile advertisement for the business. The following year, Ash rewarded the company's top five salespeople with similarly painted 1970 Coupe de Ville cars. GM has painted over 100,000 custom cars for Mary Kay. The specific shade has varied over the years from bubble-gum to soft pearlescent pink. GM had an exclusive agreement to sell cars of the specific shade only through Mary Kay. The cars are awarded to consultants as company-paid, two-year leases, and Consultants/Directors who choose to buy the cars at the end of the two-year lease period are only allowed to resell them to authorized dealers. After the lease expires, the cars are repainted before being resold.

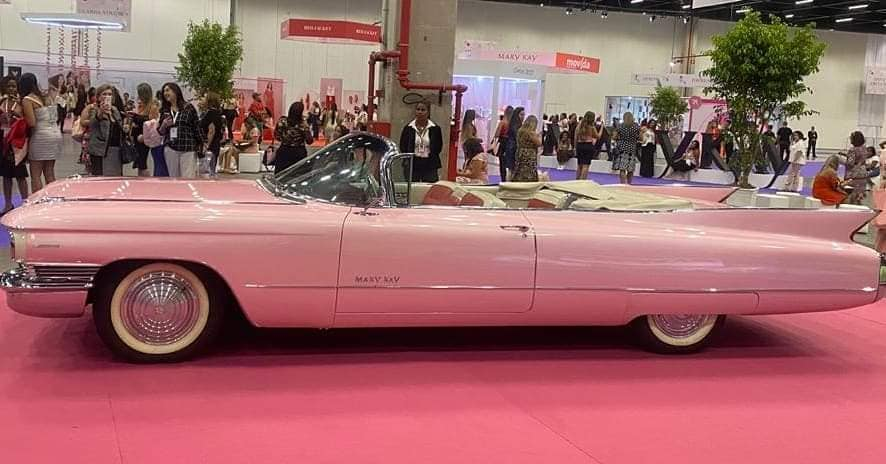
Mary Kay Pink Cadillac Convertible

Mary Kay has different car incentive levels for its Consultants. Consultants can earn the use of a silver Chevrolet Malibu or a cash compensation of $425 a month. Consultants can also earn a black Chevrolet Equinox, Chevrolet Traverse, Mini Cooper or $500 a month. "Top performing" consultants can choose between the pink Cadillac XT5 or XT6, or cash option of $900 a month. The specific qualifications for earning the car depend upon the country, and vehicle that is desired. If those qualifications are not met, then the consultant has to pay for a portion of the lease of the car for that month. Meeting the qualifications entitles the consultant to pay no monthly lease and 85% of the car insurance, or a pre-determined cash compensation award. In 2011, a solid black Ford Mustang was introduced as an incentive. In 2014, a black BMW was introduced in its place, although the pink Cadillac remains the top reward for those consultants whose units purchase over $100,000 or more of MK products at wholesale cost in a year.

== Consultants ==
There are two ways for Mary Kay consultants to earn money in Mary Kay: recruiting and retail sales. Recruiting commission earnings reflects the commission and bonuses of 4, 9 or 13% that one earns from the wholesale purchases of MK products by their team or unit. Consultants may also earn a 50% gross profit on products they sell at full retail price. There is no tracking by the company of actual sales. The quoted figure of US$1,057.14 per year (2015) for the average consultant derives from dividing the annual wholesale sales by Mary Kay Inc., by the number of Mary Kay consultants.

Based upon information supplied by Mary Kay (USA) to the Federal Trade Commission, Mary Kay has a 68.6% per annum turnover rate. An 85% per annum turnover figure has been calculated, based upon the data supplied by Mary Kay (Canada). This excludes individuals who earn a commission and are in the company for less than one year. It also excludes individuals who are in the company for more than one year but do not earn a commission check.

Each year the company holds an annual conference and seminar in Dallas, TX. The conference consists of four consecutive events over two weeks.

== Research ==
In 2023, Mary Kay announced a partnership with the European Society for Dermatological Research (ESDR), a non-profit, to create a grant program. The program will grant two scientists $20,000 to go towards research relating to skin health and diseases. Mary Kay stated that the goal would be to treat people who suffer from skin and venereal diseases. Dr. Michael Cangkrama of Switzerland and Dr. Clarisse Ganier of the UK received the grant.

== Court cases ==
=== Woolf v. Mary Kay Cosmetics ===
The 2004 court case Woolf v. Mary Kay Cosmetics argued that workplace rights could be applied to independent contractors who worked from their home. This decision was stayed and then reversed after an appeal. The Supreme Court denied certiorari on 31 May 2005. In this case, Woolf was terminated from her position as Independent Sales Director because her unit failed to make production for three consecutive months. Woolf contended that her firing was illegal, because she was suffering from cancer.

=== Liquidator court cases ===
In May 2008, Mary Kay, Inc., sued Touch of Pink Cosmetics, a website that sells product from former Mary Kay consultants at heavily reduced prices. The company claims that Touch of Pink interferes with its business by offering to purchase inventory from discontinued Independent Beauty Consultants, and that Touch of Pink's use of the Mary Kay trademark in reference to Mary Kay products it sells is deceiving. The jury found in favor of Mary Kay and awarded a judgement of $1.139 million.

On 20 July 2009, Mary Kay, Inc., sued Pink Face Cosmetics for trademark infringement. The specific issue appears to be the use of the Mary Kay name, in selling Mary Kay products on eBay and other Internet venues for less than the wholesale cost of the products.
