= Home Interiors and Gifts =

American decorating accessories manufacturer

Home Interiors and Gifts Inc.
- Company type: Private
- Industry: Decoration
- Founded: 1957; 69 years ago
- Founder: Mary C. Crowley
- Defunct: 2008; 18 years ago
- Headquarters: Carrollton, Texas
- Products: Candles, Picture frames etc.

Home Interiors and Gifts was a direct sales company specializing in decorating accessories, which were sold by more than 140,000 representatives through home parties in the United States, Canada, Mexico, and Puerto Rico. Highland Capital Management later owned a majority interest in the company. The company is defunct since 2008.

== History ==
Mary Crowley founded Home Interiors on December 5, 1957. Its product lines included artificial flowers, candles, framed artwork, mirrors, sconces, small furniture, and shelves. The company bought many of its products from its own manufacturing subsidiaries such as Laredo Candle Company. Her son, Don Carter, joined her in managing the business.

By 1982 Home Interiors had a sales force of 38,000 and gross sales of over $400 million. By 1984 the stated figures were $450 million in sales by a sales force of 39,000, mostly women, who sell door to door and at parties where women socialized as they bought "figurines" and other home decorations.

Home Interiors under Crowley's leadership had a charismatic culture that was conservative, Christian, individualistic, and featured self-help rhetoric; the company promoted the fact that it offered women flexible working schedules, membership in an enthusiastic community of saleswomen, and income.

=== Buyout ===
In 1994, Home Interiors and Gifts was sold to the investment firm of Hicks, Muse, Tate & Furst in a $1 billion leveraged buyout. The company sold more than $850 million annually in silk and polyester flower arrangements, porcelain puppies and other decorative household items at home parties.

The company announced on April 29, 2008, that it and certain of its subsidiaries filed voluntary petitions under Chapter 11 of Title 11 of the United States Bankruptcy Code for the Northern District of Texas (filing number 08-31961) in order to re-align the Company's business operations and restructure its debt. The Company intended to work with its constituencies to exit bankruptcy as expeditiously as possible, while executing on its reorganization plans. In addition to the Company, Dallas Woodcraft Company, LLC, Laredo Candle Company, LLC, HIG Holdings, LLC, Titan Sourcing, LLC, DWC GP, LLC and Home Interiors de Puerto Rico, Inc., filed voluntary petitions. Home Interiors' Mexican and Canadian subsidiaries as well as Domistyle, Inc. were not a part of the filing.

After bankruptcy Home Interiors was bought by Penny and Steve Carlile, the owners and founders of Home & Garden Party founded in 1996. They merged the two companies renaming it Celebrating Home and it continues to operate from Home and Garden Party's headquarters in Marshall, TX. After the merger Heather Chastain (former president of Home Interiors) became president of Celebrating Home. She has since been removed from her position and is no longer with the company. Home Interiors Mexico operation was also purchased by the Carliles but it continues to operate under the Home Interiors name as an independent entity.

In 2006, Home Interiors was generating $500 million in annual sales with Mike Lohner as CEO. Lohner resigned when Dallas-based investment fund Highland Capital Management acquired a majority interest in Home Interiors. He was replaced as president and chief executive officer by Richard W. Heath, who had founded Dallas-based BeautiControl Cosmetics Inc. in 1981.
