= Venus-like exoplanet =

A Venus-like exoplanet, Venus analog or exo-Venus is an exoplanet like the planet Venus in that it is a rocky planet that is close enough to its star to have a runaway greenhouse effect with a thick carbon dioxide atmosphere. More than 300 exo-Venus candidates have been identified in the Venus zone - the region around a star where a planet would have a runaway greenhouse effect.
