= Delia Lyman Porter =

American writer (1858–1933)

- Born: Delia Wood Lyman; October 3, 1858; New Haven, Connecticut, U.S.
- Died: January 16, 1933 (aged 74); New Haven
- Education: Wellesley College
- Occupations: author; social reformer; clubwoman
- Spouse: Frank Chamberlin Porter (m. 1891)
- Children: Lyman Edwards Porter; William Quincy Porter
- Parent(s): Chester Smith Lyman; Delia Williams Wood
- Relatives: Oliver Ellsworth (great-grandfather)
- Writing career
- Language: English
- Genres: books; calendars; short stories; compilations; articles outlines
- Subjects: religion; children's literature; non-fiction

Delia Lyman Porter (née, Lyman; October 3, 1858 – January 16, 1933) was an American author, social reformer, and clubwoman. She was a prominent civic worker, associated with the prohibition and the parent–teacher association movements. Porter published books, calendars, short stories, compilations, articles, and religious outlines.

== Early life and education ==
Delia Wood Lyman was born at New Haven, Connecticut, October 3, 1858. Her father was Professor Chester Smith Lyman. Her mother was Delia Williams (Wood) Lyman, a daughter of the Hon. Joseph Wood (Yale College, 1801), of New Haven, and granddaughter of Oliver Ellsworth, Chief Justice of the United States under President George Washington. Her siblings included: Elizabeth, William, Oliver, and Chester Walcott Lyman.

She was enrolled at Wellesley College, 1876–77 and 1879–80, where she was a co-founder of Zeta Alpha Society. However, she did not take a degree.

== Career ==
In 1900, she organized the Mothers' Club of Lowell House settlement and served as president. The following year, she organized the New Haven People's Choral Union. She also organized the Noon Club for factory girls at New Haven. It was largely through Porter's efforts that a bill for appointment of a woman deputy factory inspector of Connecticut was passed by the state legislature in 1907. Porter was appointed by the governor as a member of the commission to nominate the woman inspector.

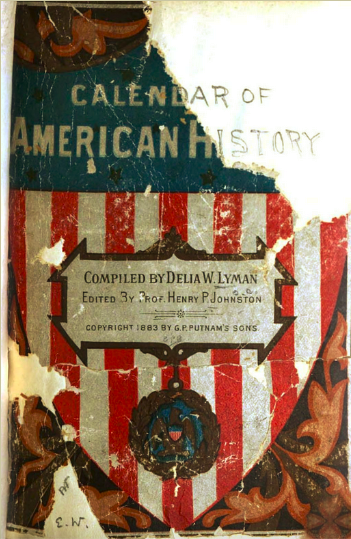
Calendar of American History (1883)

In 1884, she published, with G. P. Putnam's Sons, a Calendar of American History, which had several editions, and was used a good deal in schools. The 1904 calendar gave two rules to guarantee a happy year. The first rule was to try to work out in daily life the various secrets of a happy day suggested in the quotations for each week. The second rule was to record in abbreviated form at the close of the day its happy happenings, its joys great or small which deserve gratitude. The calendar also had space for engagements. In 1891, A. D. F. Randolph issued in one volume five short stories of Porter's, which had previously appeared in The Independent, Christian Union, and elsewhere. The book was entitled The Blues Cure and Other Stories, and had a good sale. One of the tales in this book, "The Measuring Rod", was also published by the New York Tract Society, and many thousand copies were used. She was also the author of: Measuring Rod and Other Stories (1892), An Anti-Worry Recipe and Other Stories (1905), Yearbook of Good Cheer (Pilgrim Press, 1906), Yearbook of Ideals for Every Day Living (1909), and Christian Discussion Club Outlines (1914–19).

Her contributions to publications were often of a religious character. However, in 1919, Porter wrote community betterment booklets in 1919. Likewise, she published several clever stories, including children's stories ("Time and Tommy"; "How Polly Saw the Aprons Grow"), in St. Nicholas Magazine, Wide Awake, Congregationalist, and The Outlook. In 1893, she had an interesting article in Scribner's Magazine, "Mr. Freeman at Home", regarding Edward Augustus Freeman, having for some time being a member of his household.

In 1908, in The Chautauquan, she published "How Connecticut Got Her Woman Factory Inspector", and in 1923, her article, "The Acquisition of Elmwood Home of Oliver Ellsworth", was published by the Connecticut Daughters of the American Revolution.

Opposed to the amending of the National Prohibition Act, in 1926, Porter spoke before Congress:—

I am president of the New Haven Women's Church Union of 60 churches; president of the New Haven Lowell House Mothers' Club for 25 years; chairman of religious training for Connecticut Congress of Mothers, representing 8,000. I am also a delegate appointed at a meeting of 500 women of New Haven, Conn., members of 60 Protestant churches of 8 denominations, also Catholic and Hebrew, as well as more than 50 organizations of women, who respectfully request the Senate of the United States to pass no act which will weaken the Volstead Act or the eighteenth amendment. As president for more than 25 years of a mothers' club, I know the misery of families where the husband and father was too weak to resist the saloon on pay day. None of the bills or acts now before you provide for any abolishment of the saloon. This club unanimously protests.

== Personal life ==
On June 10, 1891, she married Frank Chamberlin Porter (1859-1946), professor Biblical Theology at Yale University. They had two children, Lyman Edwards Porter (professor, University of Arkansas) and William Quincy Porter (professor, Vassar College).

Porter made her home in New Haven. In religion, she was a Congregationalist.

She was a member of the New Haven Saturday Morning Club, the Connecticut Society of Colonial Dames, and the Daughters of the American Revolution (D.A.R.). Porter helped acquire Oliver Ellsworth's Elmwood Home as a state home for the Connecticut D.A.R.

Porter visited the Territory of Hawaii in August 1924, the location being of special interest to her, for her father visited the islands with Rev. Titus Cohen in the early missionary days, and Chester Lyman's diary, which was written at that time, was about to be published.

== Death and legacy ==
Delia Wood Lyman Porter died of a heart attack on January 16, 1933, in New Haven. In 1937, Perry C. Bauder published her biography, Sketch of Mrs. Delia Lyman Porter. Her papers and that of her husband are held in the Archives at Yale University.

== Selected works ==
- Calendar of American History, by Delia W. Lyman, 1883 (Text)
- The Blues, Cure and Other Stories, by Delia Lyman Porter, 1892 (Text)
- An Anti-Worry Recipe and Other Stories, by Delia Lyman Porter, 1905 (Text)
- Yearbook of Good Cheer, 1906
- Yearbook of Ideals for Every Day Living, 1909
- Christian Discussion Club Outlines, 1914–19

=== Articles ===
- "How Connecticut Got Her Woman Factory Inspector", 1908 (Text)
- "The Acquisition of Elmwood Home of Oliver Ellsworth", 1923 (Text)
