= Chester Lyman =

American teacher, clergyman and astronomer

Chester S. Lyman
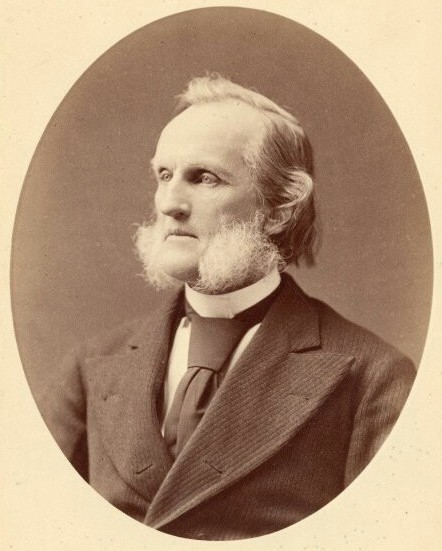
- Chester Lyman circa 1874
- Born: Chester Smith Lyman; January 13, 1814; Manchester, Connecticut
- Died: January 29, 1890 (aged 76); New Haven, Connecticut
- Education: Yale College
- Occupations: Clergyman, astronomer
- Employer: Sheffield Scientific School
- Relatives: Delia Lyman Porter (daughter)
- Awards: Member, Connecticut Academy of Arts and Sciences

Chester Smith Lyman (January 13, 1814 – January 29, 1890) was an American teacher, clergyman and astronomer.

== Early life and education ==
He was born in Manchester, Connecticut, to Chester and Mary Smith Lyman. Chester is the descendant of Richard Lyman, a settler who arrived in America in 1631. Chester's early education was in a country school, but at an early age he showed a strong interest in astronomy and the sciences. By 1833 he had gained admittance to Yale, and graduated in 1837. In his junior year he became editor of the Yale Literary Magazine and he was a member of Skull and Bones. He served for two years as Superintendent of Ellington School, then studied theology at the Union and Yale seminaries. For health reasons he then began to travel.

In 1846 he sailed to Hawaii and remained for a year. While in Hawaii, he visited missionaries, including his distant cousin David Belden Lyman. In 1847 he sailed to California. There he became a surveyor, mapping ranches and towns. For a few months he joined in the California Gold Rush, then returned to his surveying work. In 1850 he was married to Delia W. Wood, and settled in New Haven. The couple would have six children, with four surviving to adulthood, including Delia Lyman Porter, author, organizer, social reformer, and clubwoman.

== Career ==
He became a professor of Industrial Mechanics and Physics at Yale's Sheffield Scientific School, and was considered an eminent scholar. He invented the combined transit instrument and zenith telescope that was used to determine latitude, including that of Hawaii. He was on the board of managers for the Yale Observatory, and in December 1866 he was the first to observe the delicate ring of light surrounding Venus when the planet is in inferior conjunction. This observation helped confirm the presence of an atmosphere around the planet. He patented a design for a wave machine in 1867. In 1871 he became a professor of astronomy and physics at the same institution, then exclusively of astronomy in 1884 as his health began to fail. He retired as professor emeritus in 1889. He became the director of the Yale Observatory and held that post until his death. He died in 1890 as the result of a stroke, which had kept him home-bound for the last two years of his life.

Chester Lyman was a member of the Connecticut Academy of Arts and Sciences and an honorary member of the British Association for the Advancement of Science. He served as president of the Connecticut Academy of Arts and Sciences for 20 years. His son, Chester W. Lyman, established the Chester S. Lyman Lecture Series at Yale in memory of his father.
