= Venus =

Second planet from the Sun

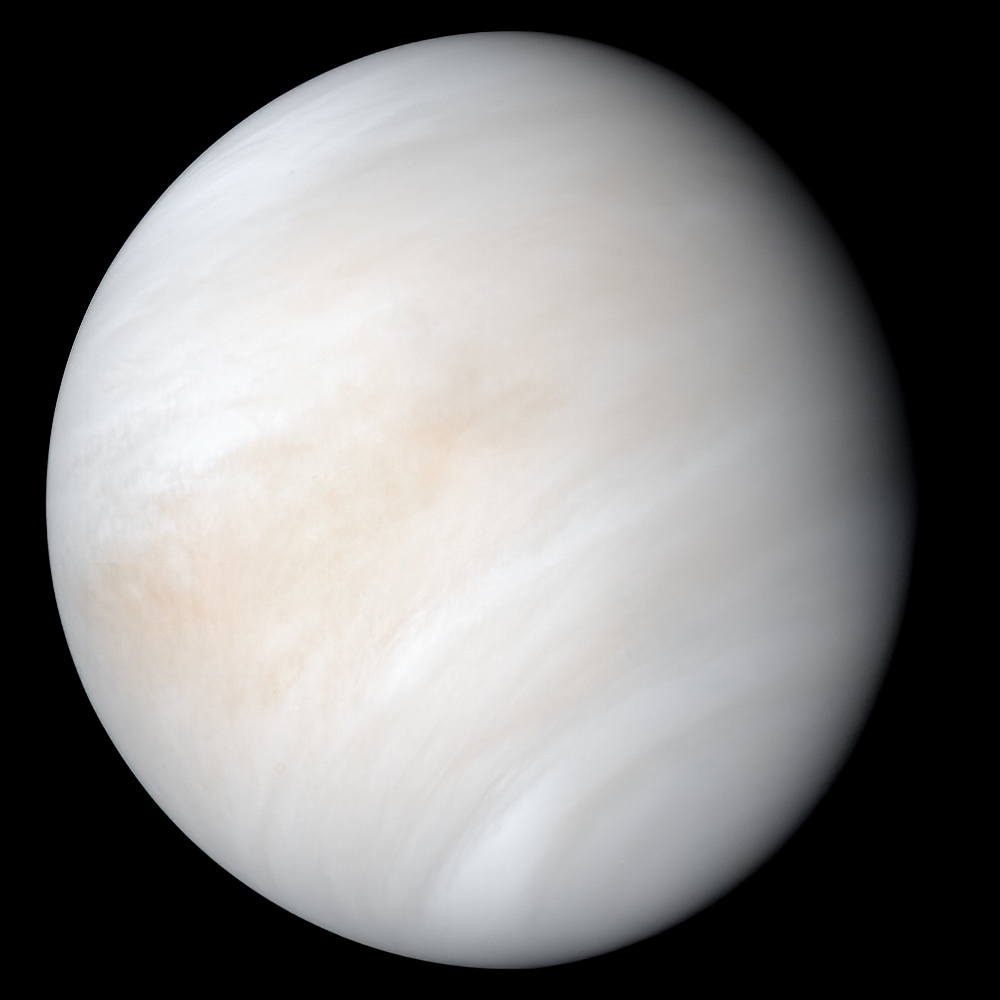
- False colour image of Venus as taken by Mariner 10 in 1974.

Designations
- Pronunciation: /ˈviːnəs/
- Named after: Venus
- Adjectives: Venusian /vɪˈnjuːziən, -ʒən/, rarely Cytherean /sɪθəˈriːən/ or Venerean / Venerian /vɪˈnɪəriən/
- Symbol: ♀

Orbital characteristics
- Epoch J2000
- Aphelion: 0.728213 AU (108.94 million km)
- Perihelion: 0.718440 AU (107.48 million km)
- Semi-major axis: 0.723332 AU (108.21 million km)
- Eccentricity: 0.006772
- Orbital period (sidereal): 224.701 d; 0.615198 Julian year; 0.615187 sidereal year; 1.92 Venus solar day
- Orbital period (synodic): 583.92 days
- Average orbital speed: 35.02 km/s
- Mean anomaly: 50.115°
- Inclination: 3.39458° to ecliptic; 3.86° to Sun's equator; 2.15° to invariable plane
- Longitude of ascending node: 76.680°
- Argument of perihelion: 54.884°
- Satellites: None

Physical characteristics
- Mean radius: 6,051.8±1.0 km; 0.9499 Earths
- Flattening: 0
- Surface area: 4.6023×10^{8} km^{2}; 0.902 Earths
- Volume: 9.2843×10^{11} km^{3}; 0.857 Earths
- Mass: (4.86731±0.00023)×10^{24} kg; 0.815 Earths
- Mean density: 5.243±0.003 g/cm^{3}
- Surface gravity: 8.87 m/s^{2} (0.904 g_{0})
- Escape velocity: 10.36 km/s (6.44 mi/s)
- Synodic rotation period: −116.75 d (retrograde); 1 Venus solar day
- Sidereal rotation period: −243.0226 d (retrograde)
- Equatorial rotation velocity: 1.81 m/s
- Axial tilt: 2.64° (for retrograde rotation); 177.36° (to orbit) (Note: Defining the rotation as retrograde, as done by NASA space missions and the USGS, puts Ishtar Terra in the northern hemisphere and makes the axial tilt 2.64°. Following the right-hand rule for prograde rotation puts Ishtar Terra in the negative hemisphere and makes the axial tilt 177.36°.)
- North pole right ascension: 18^{h} 11^{m} 2^{s}; 272.76°
- North pole declination: 67.16°
- Albedo: 0.689 (geometric); 0.76 (Bond)
- Temperature: 232 K (−41 °C) (blackbody temperature)
Surface temp.	min	mean	max
Kelvin		737 K
Celsius		464 °C
Fahrenheit		867 °F
- Surface absorbed dose rate: 2.1×10^{−6} μGy/h
- Surface equivalent dose rate: 2.2×10^{−6} μSv/h; 0.092–22 μSv/h at cloud level
- Apparent magnitude: −4.92 to −2.98
- Absolute magnitude (H): −4.4
- Angular diameter: 9.7″–66.0″

Atmosphere
- Surface pressure: 93 bar (9.3 MPa); 92 atm
- Composition by volume: 96.5% carbon dioxide; 3.5% nitrogen; 0.015% sulphur dioxide; 0.0070% argon; 0.0020% water vapour; 0.0017% carbon monoxide; 0.0012% helium; 0.0007% neon; Trace carbonyl sulfide; Trace hydrogen chloride; Trace hydrogen fluoride

Venus is the second planet from the Sun. Similar in size and mass to Earth, Venus has no liquid water, and its atmosphere is far thicker and denser than that of any other rocky body in the Solar System. The atmosphere is composed mostly of carbon dioxide and has a thick cloud layer of sulfuric acid that spans the whole planet. At the mean surface level, the atmosphere reaches a temperature of 737 K (464 °C; 867 °F), making it the hottest planet in the solar system and also a pressure 92 times greater than Earth's at sea level, turning the lowest layer of the atmosphere into a supercritical fluid. From Earth, Venus is visible as a star-like point of light, appearing brighter than any other natural point of light in the sky, as either the brightest "morning star" or "evening star". It was also given the poetic name Ēarendel in Old English, meaning "ray of light" along with the two previous epithets.

Venus orbits closer to the Sun than the Earth does. The orbits of Venus and Earth make the two planets approach each other in synodic periods of 1.6 years. In the course of this, Venus comes closer to Earth than any other planet. In interplanetary spaceflight from Earth, Venus is frequently used as a waypoint for gravity assists, offering a more economical route allowing spacecraft to save fuel. Venus has no moons and a very slow retrograde rotation about its axis, a result of competing forces of solar tidal locking and differential heating of Venus's massive atmosphere. As a result, a Venusian day is 116.75 Earth days long, about half a Venusian solar year, which is 224.7 Earth days long.

Venus has a weak magnetosphere; lacking an internal dynamo, it is induced by the solar wind interacting with the atmosphere. Internally, Venus has a core, a mantle, and a crust. The latter undergoes stagnant lid tectonics, which means that internal heat escapes through active volcanism, resulting in periodic resurfacing events. Venus may have had liquid surface water early in its history with a habitable environment, before a runaway greenhouse effect evaporated any water and turned Venus into its present state. There are atmospheric conditions at cloud layer altitudes that are the most similar ones to Earth in the Solar System and have been identified as possibly favourable for life on Venus, with potential biomarkers found in 2020, spurring new research and missions to Venus.

Throughout history humans across the globe have observed Venus and it has acquired particular importance in many cultures. With telescopes, the phases of Venus became discernible and, by 1613, were presented as decisive evidence disproving the then-dominant geocentric model and supporting the heliocentric model. Venus was visited for the first time in 1961 by Venera 1, which flew past the planet, achieving the first interplanetary spaceflight. The first data from Venus were returned during the second interplanetary mission, Mariner 2, in 1962. In 1967, the first interplanetary impactor, Venera 4, reached Venus, followed by the lander Venera 7 in 1970, with the first images captured by Mariner 10 during its 1974 gravity assist en route to Mercury. As of 2025, Solar Orbiter is on its way to fly by Venus in 2026, and the next mission planned to launch to Venus is the Venus Life Finder, scheduled for 2026 as well.

== Physical characteristics ==
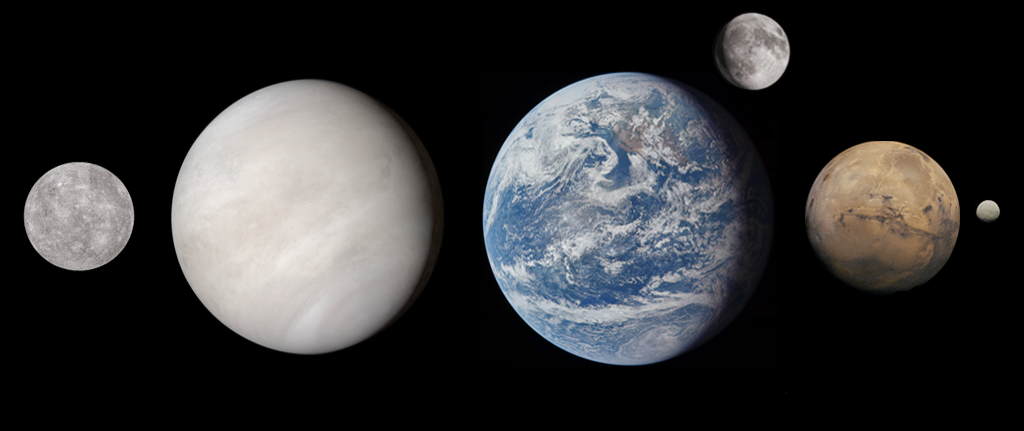
Venus to scale among the Inner Solar System planetary-mass objects. From left: Mercury, Venus, Earth, the Moon, Mars and Ceres

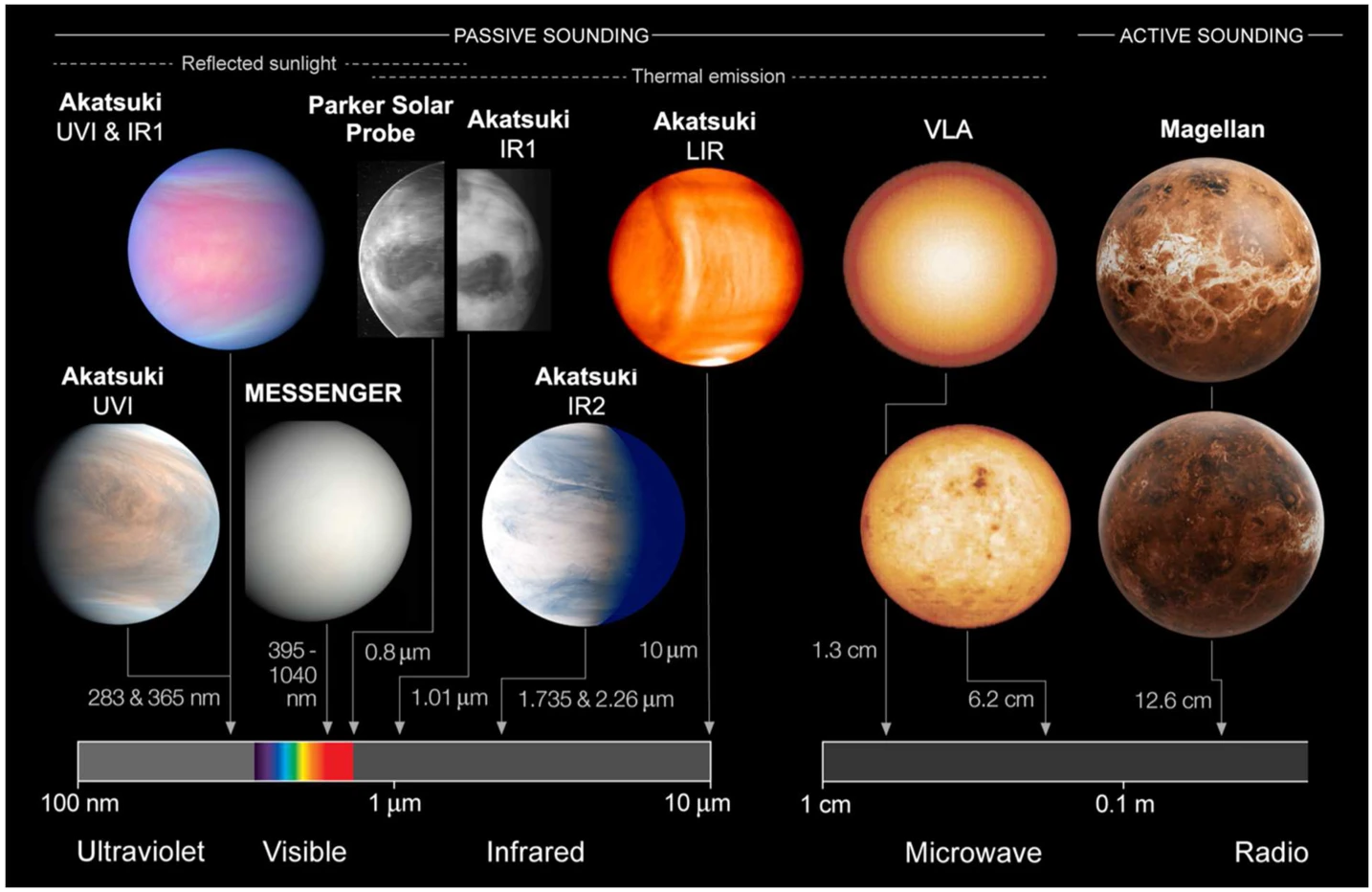
Venus imaged in different wavelengths

Venus is one of the four terrestrial planets in the Solar System, meaning that it is a rocky body like Earth. It is similar to Earth in size and mass and is often described as Earth's "sister" or "twin". Venus is very close to spherical due to its slow rotation. It has a diameter of 12,103.6 km (7,520.8 mi)—only 638.4 km (396.7 mi) less than Earth's—and its mass is 81.5% of Earth's, making it the third-smallest planet in the Solar System. Conditions on the surface of Venus differ radically from those on Earth because its dense atmosphere is 96.5% carbon dioxide, causing an intense greenhouse effect, with most of the remaining 3.5% being nitrogen. The surface pressure is 9.3 megapascals (93 bars), and the average surface temperature is 737 K (464 °C; 867 °F), above the critical points of both major constituents and making the surface atmosphere a supercritical fluid of mainly supercritical carbon dioxide and some supercritical nitrogen.

=== Natural history ===
==== Formation ====
The rocky terrestrial planets including Venus are thought to have formed in five stages: dust settling, planetesimal formation, planetary embryos, giant impacts, and finally formation of atmospheres. Limited measurements from Venus have prevented a more detailed analysis of the formation timeline.

Venus may have had active plate tectonics during its first billion years, yielding volcanic outgassing leading to the current amount of nitrogen in its atmosphere. As a result, it may have had a more habitable environment, possibly one capable of sustaining life. Venus has gained interest as a case for research into the development of Earth-like planets and their habitability. However, analysis of gas decomposition in its current atmosphere shows that Venus's volcanic activity yields too little water to create oceans, indicating that Venus has likely been a inhospitable world for its entire history.

==== Future ====
Venus is expected to be destroyed, along with Mercury, and possibly the Earth and the Moon, when the Sun becomes a red giant in approximately seven or eight billion years.

=== Geography ===
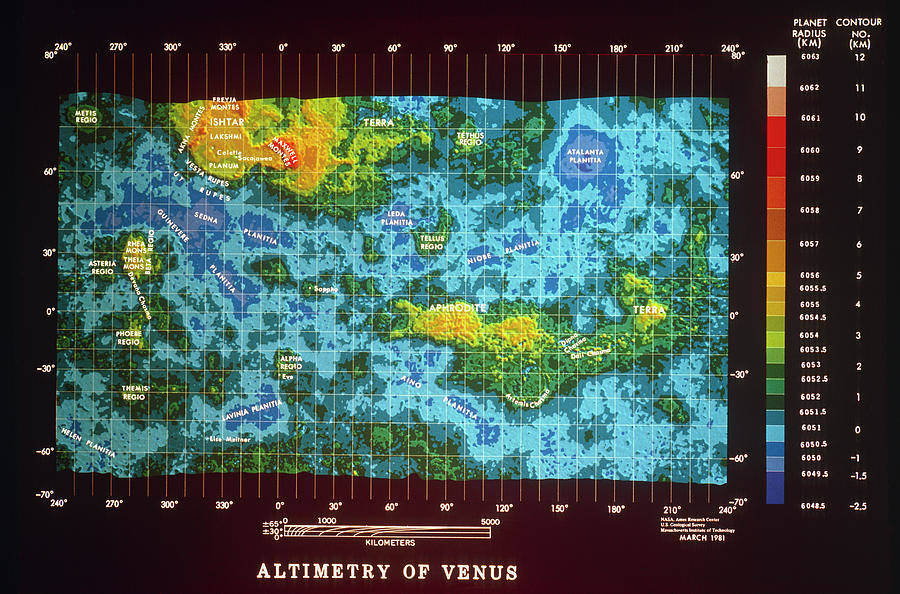
Colour-coded elevation map, showing the elevated terrae "continents" in yellow and minor features of Venus

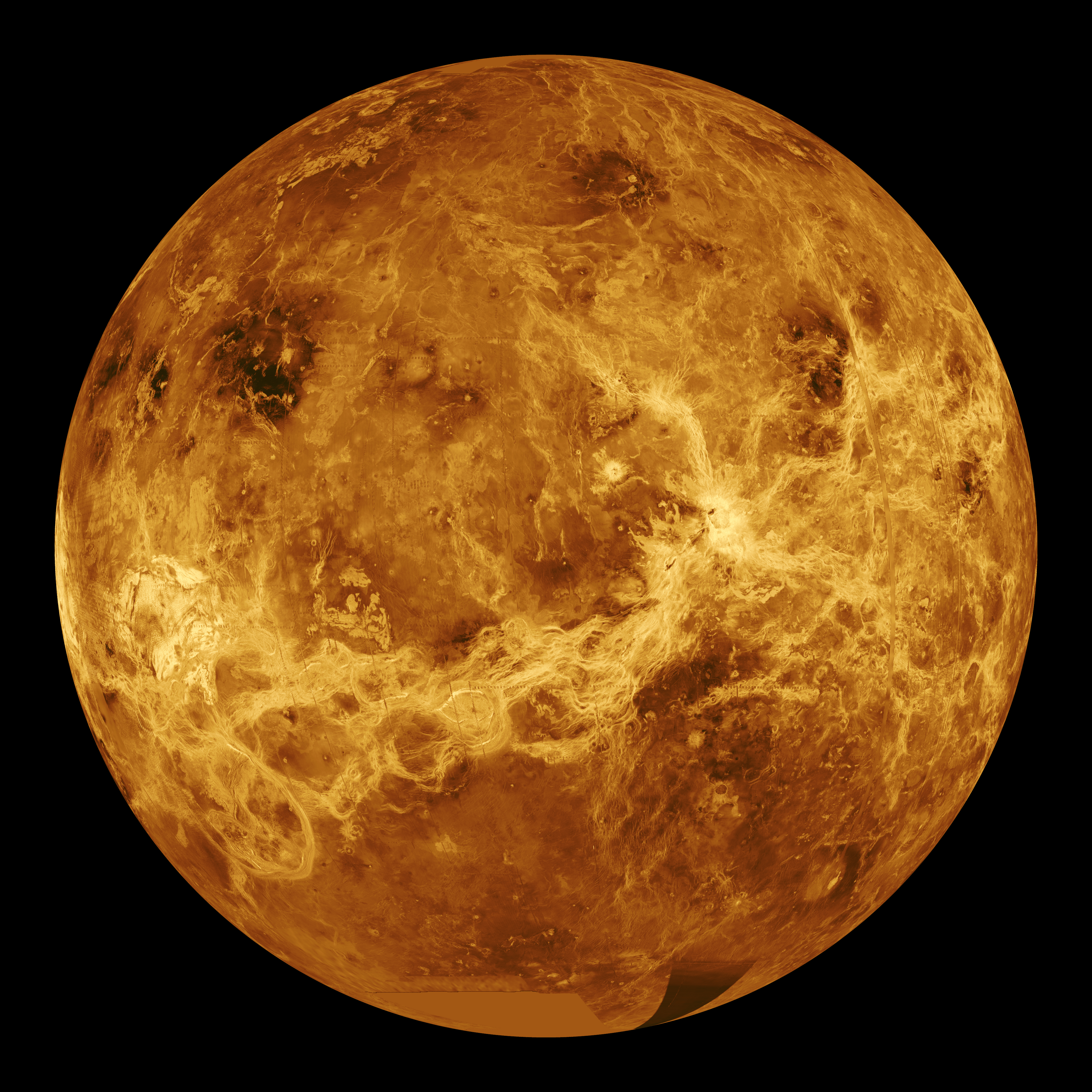
Spherical view of radar data of the surface of Venus, highlighting surface features (1989, Magellan). The colours do not represent the appearance of the surface in visible light.

The Venusian surface was a subject of speculation until some of its secrets were revealed by probes in the 20th century. Venera landers in 1975 and 1982 returned images of a surface covered in sediment and relatively angular rocks. The surface was mapped in detail by Magellan in 1990–91. There is evidence of extensive volcanism, and variations in the atmospheric sulphur dioxide may indicate that there are active volcanoes.

About 80% of the Venusian surface is covered by smooth, volcanic plains, consisting of 70% plains with wrinkle ridges and 10% smooth or lobate plains. Two highland "continents" make up the rest of its surface area, one lying in the planet's northern hemisphere and the other just south of the equator. The northern continent is called Ishtar Terra after Ishtar, the Babylonian goddess of love, and is about the size of Australia. The Maxwell Montes mountain range lies on Ishtar Terra. The southern continent is called Aphrodite Terra, after the Greek mythological goddess of love, and is the larger of the two highland regions at roughly the size of South America. A network of fractures and faults covers much of this area.

There is recent evidence of lava flow on Venus (2024), such as flows on Sif Mons, a shield volcano, and on Niobe Planitia, a flat plain. There are visible calderas. The planet has few impact craters, demonstrating that the surface is relatively young, at 300–600 million years old. Venus has some unique surface features in addition to the impact craters, mountains, and valleys commonly found on rocky planets. Among these are flat-topped volcanic features called "farra", which look somewhat like pancakes and range in size from 20 to 50 km (12 to 31 mi) across, and from 100 to 1,000 m (330 to 3,280 ft) high; radial, star-like fracture systems called "novae"; features with both radial and concentric fractures resembling spider webs, known as "arachnoids"; and "coronae", circular rings of fractures sometimes surrounded by a depression. These features are volcanic in origin.

Most Venusian surface features are named after historical and mythological women. Exceptions are Maxwell Montes, named after James Clerk Maxwell, and highland regions Alpha Regio, Beta Regio, and Ovda Regio. The last three features were named before the current system was adopted by the International Astronomical Union, the body which oversees planetary nomenclature.

The longitude of physical features on Venus is expressed relative to its prime meridian. The original prime meridian passed through the radar-bright spot at the centre of the oval feature Eve, located south of Alpha Regio. After the Venera missions were completed, the prime meridian was redefined to pass through the central peak in the crater Ariadne on Sedna Planitia.

The stratigraphically oldest tessera terrains have consistently lower thermal emissivity than the surrounding basaltic plains measured by Venus Express and Magellan, indicating a different, possibly a more felsic, mineral assemblage. The mechanism to generate a large amount of felsic crust usually requires the presence of a water ocean and plate tectonics, implying that habitable condition existed on early Venus, with large bodies of water at some point. However, the nature of tessera terrains is far from certain.

==== Volcanism ====
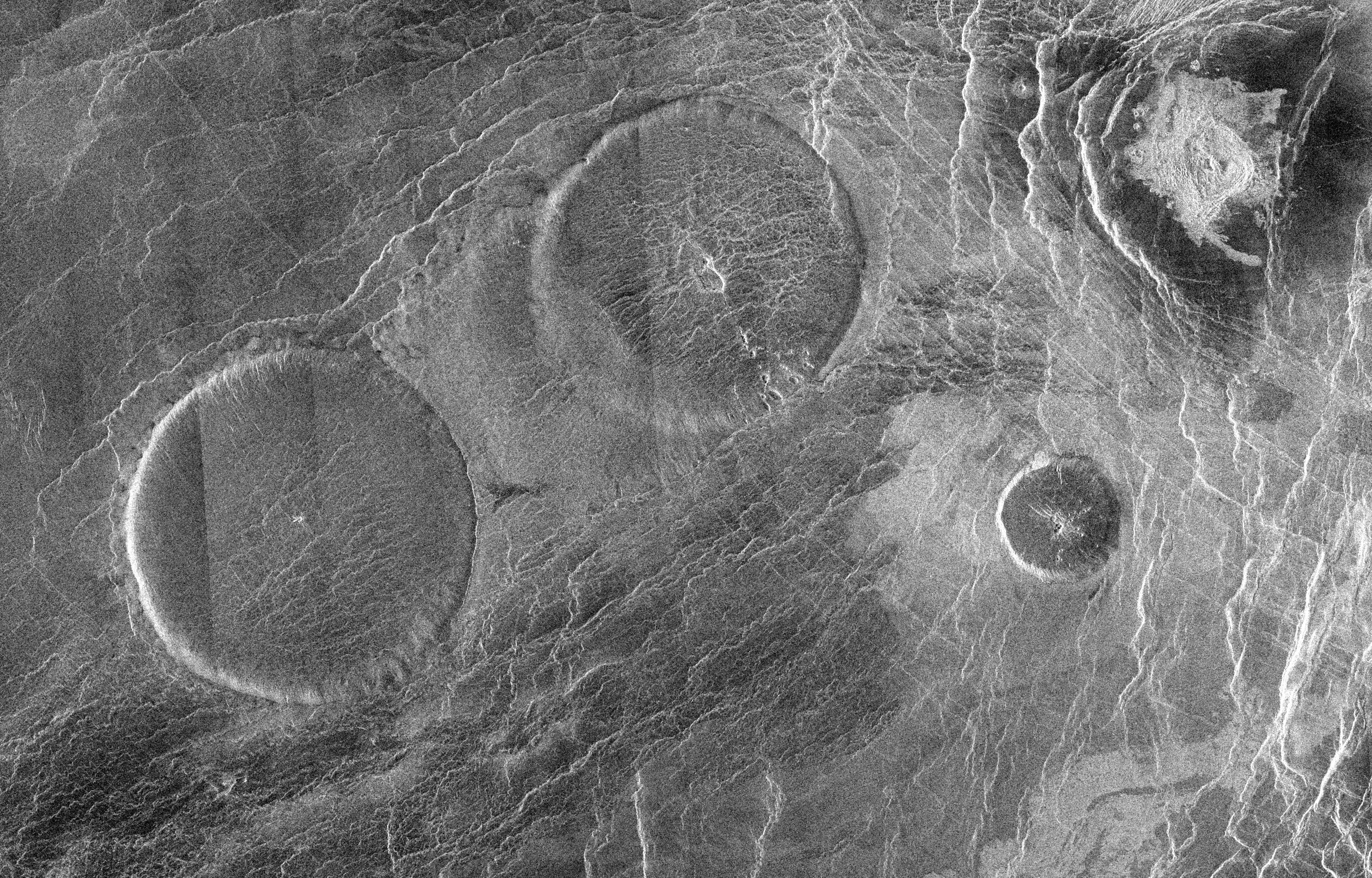
Radar mosaic of two pancake domes in Venus's Eistla region—both 65 km (40 mi) wide and less than 1 km (0.62 mi) high

Much of the Venusian surface appears to have been shaped by volcanic activity. Venus has several times as many volcanoes as Earth, and it has 167 large volcanoes that are over 100 km (60 mi) across. The only volcanic complex of this size on Earth is the Big Island of Hawaii. More than 85,000 volcanoes on Venus have been identified and mapped. This is not because Venus is more volcanically active than Earth, but because its crust is older and is not subject to the erosion processes active on Earth. Earth's oceanic crust is continually recycled by subduction at the boundaries of tectonic plates, and has an average age of about 100 million years, whereas the Venusian surface is estimated to be 300–600 million years old.

Several lines of evidence point to ongoing volcanic activity on Venus. Sulfur dioxide concentrations in the upper atmosphere dropped by a factor of 10 between 1978 and 1986, jumped in 2006, and again declined 10-fold. This may mean that levels were boosted several times by large volcanic eruptions. It has been suggested that Venusian lightning (discussed below) could originate from volcanic activity (i.e. volcanic lightning). In January 2020, astronomers reported evidence suggesting that Venus is currently volcanically active, specifically the detection of olivine, a volcanic product that would weather quickly on the planet's surface.

This massive volcanic activity is fuelled by a hot interior, which models say could be explained by energetic collisions when the planet was young, as well as radioactive decay as in the case of the earth. Impacts would have had significantly higher velocity than on Earth, both because Venus moves faster due to its closer proximity to the Sun and because high-eccentricity objects colliding with the planet would have high speeds.

In 2008 and 2009, the first direct evidence for ongoing volcanism was observed by Venus Express, in the form of four transient localized infrared hot spots within the rift zone Ganis Chasma, (Note: Misstated as "Ganiki Chasma" in the press release and scientific publication.) near the shield volcano Maat Mons. Three of the spots were observed in more than one successive orbit. These spots are thought to represent lava freshly released by volcanic eruptions. The actual temperatures are not known, because the size of the hot spots could not be measured, but are likely to have been in the 800–1,100 K (527–827 °C; 980–1,520 °F) range, relative to a normal temperature of 740 K (467 °C; 872 °F). In 2023, scientists reexamined topographical images of the Maat Mons region taken by the Magellan orbiter. Using computer simulations, they determined that the topography had changed during an 8-month interval, and concluded that active volcanism was the cause.

==== Craters ====
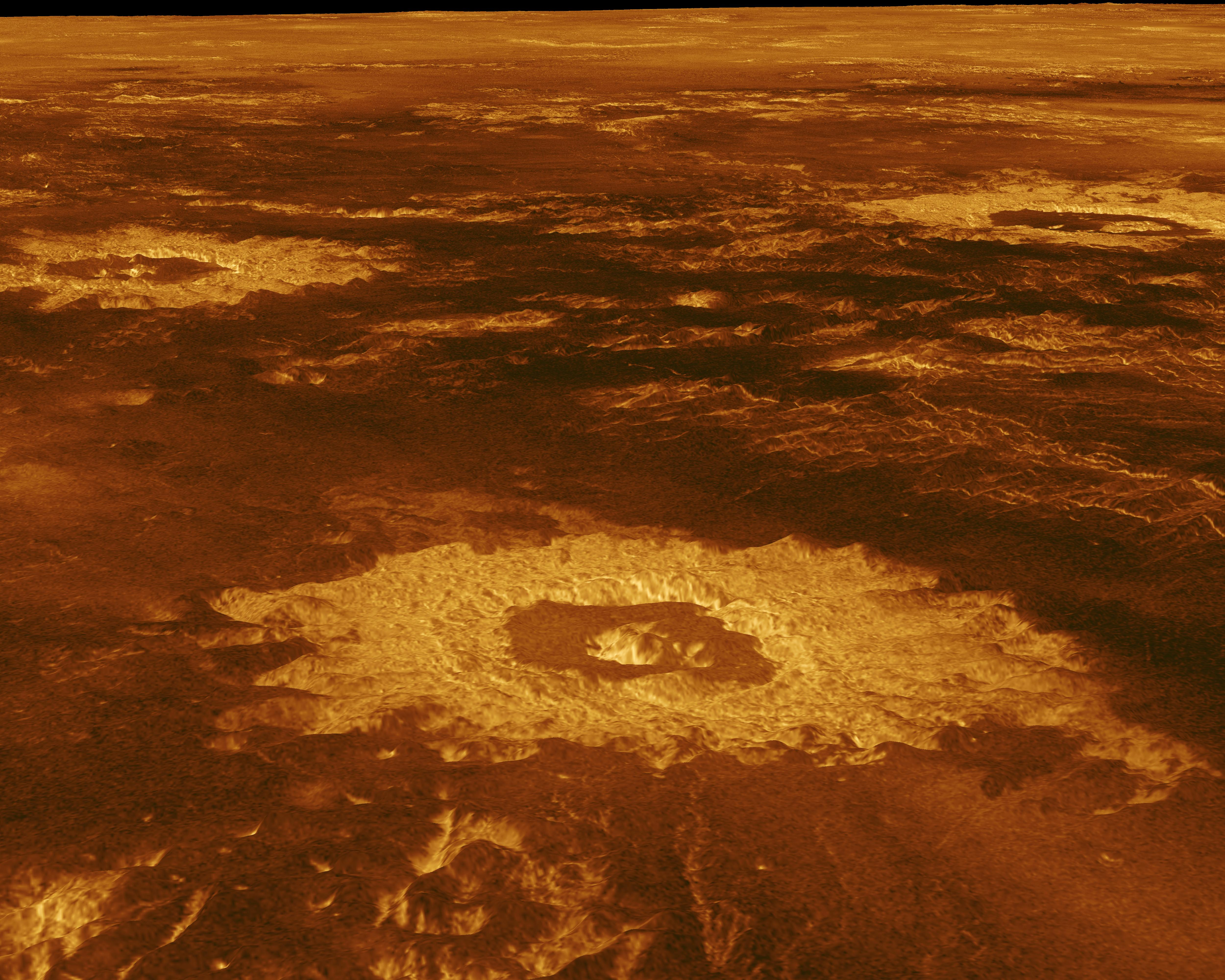
Impact craters on the surface of Venus (false-colour, 3D projection image reconstructed from radar data)

There are almost a thousand impact craters on Venus, evenly distributed across its surface. On other cratered bodies, such as Earth and the Moon, craters show a range of states of degradation. On the Moon, degradation is caused by subsequent impacts, whereas on Earth it is caused by wind and rain erosion. On Venus, about 85% of the craters are in pristine condition. The number of craters, together with their well-preserved condition, indicates the planet underwent a global resurfacing event 300–600 million years ago, followed by a decay in volcanism. Whereas Earth's crust is in continuous motion, Venus is thought to be unable to sustain such a process. Without plate tectonics to dissipate heat from its mantle, Venus instead undergoes a cyclical process in which mantle temperatures rise until they reach a critical level that weakens the crust. Then, over a period of about 100 million years, subduction occurs on an enormous scale, completely recycling the crust.

Venusian craters range from 3 to 280 km (2 to 174 mi) in diameter. No craters are smaller than 3 km, because of the effects of the dense atmosphere on incoming objects. Objects with less than a certain kinetic energy are slowed so much by the atmosphere that they do not create an impact crater. Incoming projectiles less than 50 m (160 ft) in diameter will fragment and burn up in the atmosphere before reaching the ground.

=== Internal structure ===
The differentiated structure of Venus

Without data from reflection seismology or knowledge of its moment of inertia, little direct information has been available about the internal structure and geochemistry of Venus. The similarity in size and density between Venus and Earth suggests that they share a similar internal structure: a core, mantle, and crust. Like that of Earth, the Venusian core is most likely at least partially liquid because the two planets have been cooling at about the same rate, although a completely solid core cannot be ruled out. The slightly smaller size of Venus means pressures are 24% lower in its deep interior than Earth's. The predicted values for the moment of inertia based on planetary models suggest a core radius of 2,900–3,450 km. There is now an estimate of 3,500 km from the moment of inertia based on the rate of axial precession, measured between 2006 and 2020.

The crust of Venus is estimated to be 40 kilometers thick on average and at most 65 kilometers thick.

The principal difference between the two planets is the lack of evidence for plate tectonics on Venus, possibly because its crust is too strong to subduct without water to make it less viscous. The resulting stagnant lid tectonics reduces heat loss from the planet, preventing it from cooling and providing a likely explanation for its lack of an internally generated magnetic field. Instead, Venus may lose its internal heat in periodic major resurfacing events.

=== Magnetic field and core ===
Venus interacts with the solar wind. Components of the induced magnetosphere are shown.

In 1967, Venera 4 found Venus's magnetic field to be much weaker than that of Earth. This magnetic field is induced by an interaction between the ionosphere and the solar wind, rather than by an internal dynamo as in the Earth's core. Venus's small induced magnetosphere provides negligible protection to the atmosphere against solar and cosmic radiation.

The lack of an intrinsic magnetic field on Venus was surprising, given that it is similar to Earth in size and was expected to contain a dynamo at its core. A dynamo requires three things: a conducting liquid, rotation, and convection. The core is thought to be electrically conductive and, although its rotation is often thought to be too slow, simulations show it is adequate to produce a dynamo. This implies that the dynamo is missing because of a lack of convection in Venus's core. On Earth, convection occurs in the liquid outer layer of the core because the bottom of the liquid layer is much higher in temperature than the top. On Venus, a global resurfacing event may have shut down plate tectonics and led to a reduced heat flux through the crust. This insulating effect would cause the mantle temperature to increase, thereby reducing the heat flux out of the core. As a result, no internal geodynamo is available to drive a magnetic field. Instead, the heat from the core is reheating the crust.

One possibility is that Venus has no solid inner core, or that its core is not cooling, so that the entire liquid part of the core is at approximately the same temperature. Another possibility is that its core has already been completely solidified. The state of the core is highly dependent on the concentration of sulphur, which is unknown at present.

Another possibility is that the absence of a large impact on Venus (contra the Earth's "Moon-forming" impact) left the core of Venus stratified from the core's incremental formation, and without the forces to initiate/sustain convection, and thus a "geodynamo".

The weak magnetosphere around Venus means that the solar wind interacts directly with its outer atmosphere. Here, ions of hydrogen and oxygen are being created by the dissociation of water molecules due to ultraviolet radiation. The solar wind then supplies energy that gives some of these ions sufficient speed to escape Venus's gravity field. This erosion process results in a steady loss of low-mass hydrogen, helium, and oxygen ions, whereas higher-mass molecules, such as carbon dioxide, are more likely to be retained. Atmospheric erosion by the solar wind could have led to the loss of most of Venus's water during the first billion years after it formed. However, the planet may have retained a dynamo for its first 2–3 billion years, so the water loss may have occurred more recently. The erosion has increased the ratio of higher-mass deuterium to lower-mass hydrogen in the atmosphere 100 times compared to the rest of the solar system.

== Atmosphere and climate ==
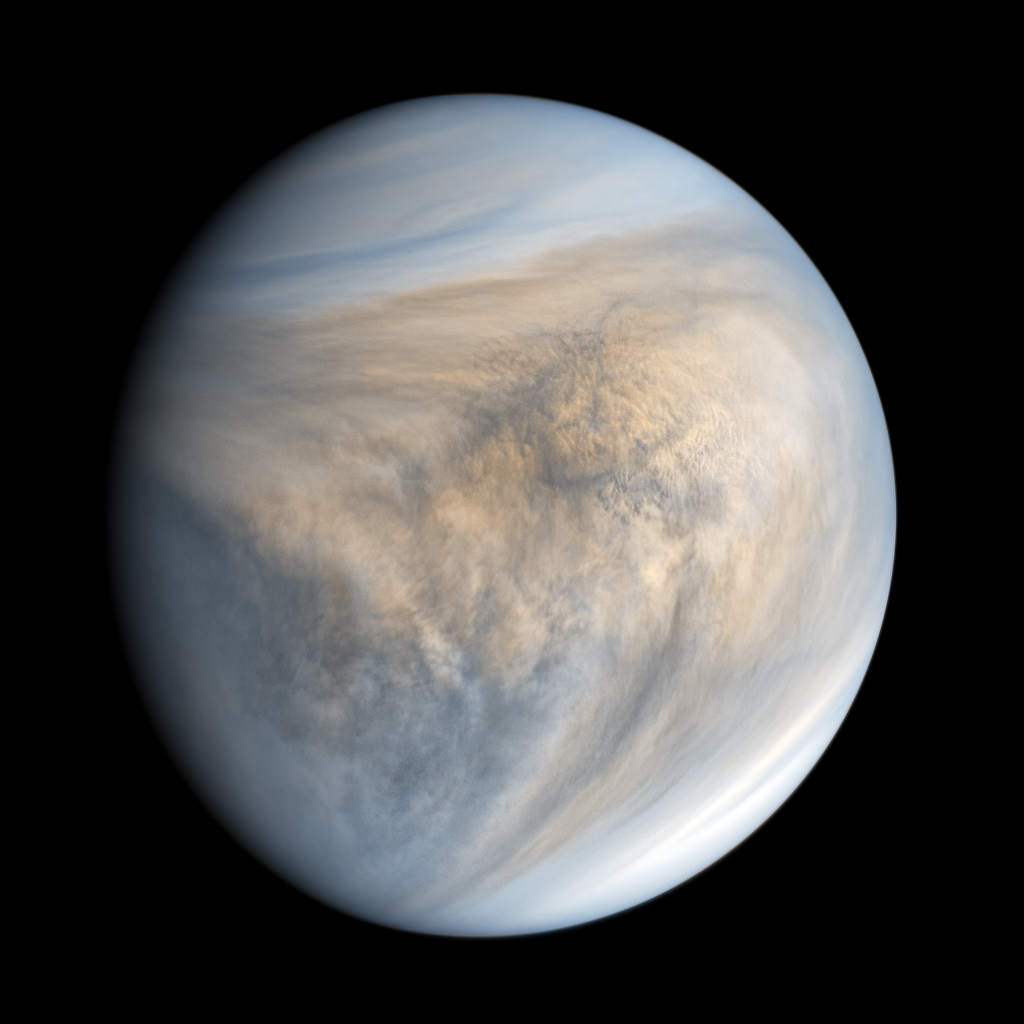
Cloud structure of the Venusian atmosphere, made visible through ultraviolet imaging

Venus has a dense atmosphere composed of 96.5% carbon dioxide, 3.5% nitrogen—both exist as supercritical fluids at the planet's surface with a density 6.5% that of water—and traces of other gases including sulphur dioxide. The mass of its atmosphere is 92 times that of Earth's, whereas the pressure at its surface is about 93 times that at Earth's—a pressure equivalent to that at a depth of nearly 1 km (5/8 mi) under Earth's ocean surfaces. The density at the surface is 65 kg/m^{3} (4.1 lb/cu ft), 6.5% that of water or 50 times as dense as Earth's atmosphere at 293 K (20 °C; 68 °F) at sea level. The CO_{2}-rich atmosphere generates the strongest greenhouse effect in the Solar System, creating surface temperatures of at least 735 K (462 °C; 864 °F). This makes the Venusian surface hotter than Mercury's, even though Venus is nearly twice Mercury's distance from the Sun and thus receives only around a quarter of Mercury's solar irradiance, of 2,600 W/m^{2} (double that of Earth). Because of its runaway greenhouse effect, Venus has been identified by scientists such as Carl Sagan as a warning and research object linked to climate change on Earth. Venus has thus been called a greenhouse planet.

Venus's atmosphere is rich in primordial noble gases compared to that of Earth. This enrichment indicates an early divergence from Earth in evolution. An unusually large comet impact or accretion of a more massive primary atmosphere from the solar nebula have been proposed to explain the enrichment. However, the atmosphere is poor in radiogenic argon-40, a proxy for mantle degassing, suggesting an early shutdown of major magmatism.

Studies have suggested that billions of years ago, the atmosphere of Venus may have been much more like the one surrounding the early Earth, and there may have been substantial quantities of liquid water on the surface. After a period of 600 million to several billion years, the rising luminosity of the Sun and possibly large volcanic resurfacing caused the evaporation of the original water. A runaway greenhouse effect was created once a critical level of greenhouse gases (including water) was reached in the atmosphere.

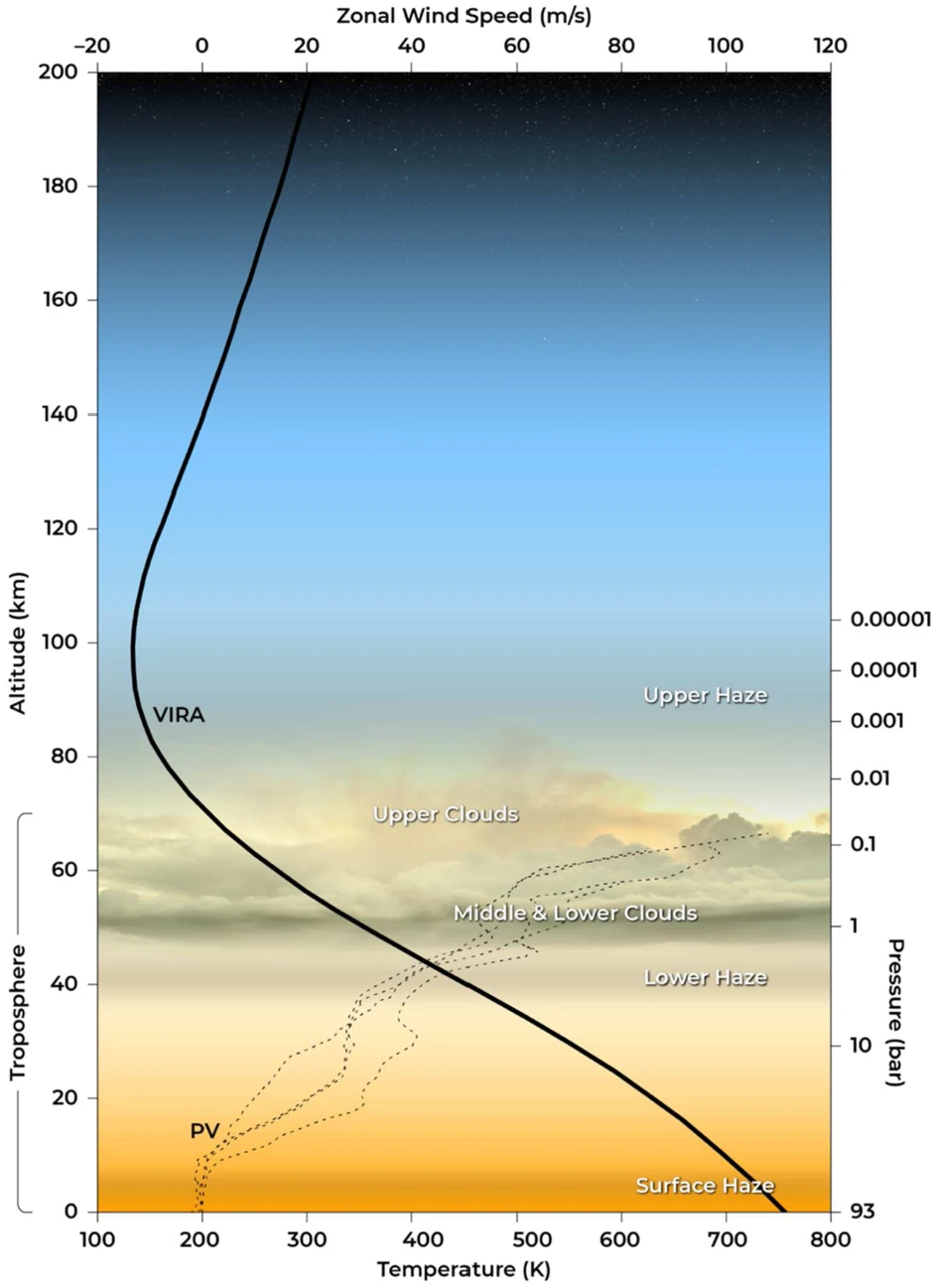
Atmospheric profile by altitude (left scale): cloud layers, temperature change (VIRA thick line and bottom scale), pressure change (right scale) and wind speed (PV dotted lines and top scale)

Thermal inertia and the transfer of heat by winds in the lower atmosphere mean that the surface temperature does not vary significantly between the hemispheres facing and not facing the Sun, despite Venus's slow rotation. Winds at the surface are slow, moving at a few kilometres per hour, but because of the high density of the atmosphere at the surface, they exert a significant amount of force against obstructions, and transport dust and small stones across the surface. This alone would make it difficult for a human to walk through, even without the heat, pressure, and lack of oxygen.

Above the dense CO_{2} layer are thick clouds 45 to 70 km above the surface, consisting mainly of sulphuric acid, which is formed by a reaction catalyzed by UV radiation from sulphur dioxide molecules and then water, resulting in sulphuric acid hydrate. Additionally, the clouds contain approximately 1% ferric chloride. Other possible constituents of the cloud particles are ferric sulfate, aluminium chloride and phosphoric anhydride. Clouds at different levels have different compositions and particle size distributions. These clouds cover the whole planet and prevent visual observation of the surface. The dense atmosphere and highly reflective clouds gives it a high albedo of 0.68, meaning it reflects nearly 70% of the incident sunlight. The permanent cloud cover means that although Venus is closer than Earth to the Sun, it receives less sunlight on the ground, with only 10% of the received sunlight reaching the surface, resulting in average daytime levels of illumination at the surface of 14,000 lux, comparable to that on Earth "in the daytime with overcast clouds".

Venus's atmosphere rotates much faster than its solid body, a phenomenon known as atmospheric super-rotation. This results in strong 300 km/h (185 mph) winds at the cloud tops, which complete a full rotation around the planet in about 4 days, corresponding to 60 times the speed of the planet's rotation, whereas Earth's strongest winds reach only 10–20% of its rotational speed.

Although Venus looks featureless in visible light, there are bands or streaks in the UV, whose origin has not been pinned down. The absorption of UV may be due to a compound of oxygen and sulfur, OSSO, which has a double bond between the sulfur atoms and exists in "cis" and "trans" forms, or due to polysulfur compounds from S_{2} to S_{8}.

Venus temperature
Location	Surface temperature
Deep depressions	~750 K (477 °C)
Average	~740 K (467 °C)
atop Maxwell Montes	~650 K (377 °C)

The surface of Venus is effectively isothermal; it retains a constant temperature not only between the two hemispheres but between the equator and the poles. Venus's minute axial tilt—less than 3°, compared to 23° on Earth—also minimizes seasonal temperature variation. Altitude is one of the few factors that affect Venusian temperatures; in particular, the coolest points occur at the highest-altitude points, such as the mountain peaks of the Maxwell Montes range. In 1995, the Magellan spacecraft imaged a highly reflective substance at the tops of the highest mountain peaks, a "Venus snow" that bore a strong resemblance to terrestrial snow. This substance likely formed by a similar process to snow, albeit at a far higher temperature. Too volatile to condense on the surface, it rose in gaseous form to higher elevations, where it is cooler and could precipitate. The identity of this substance is not known with certainty, but speculation has ranged from elemental tellurium to lead sulfide (galena).

Although Venus has no seasons, in 2019 astronomers identified a cyclical variation in sunlight absorption by the atmosphere, possibly caused by opaque, absorbing particles suspended in the upper clouds. The variation causes observed changes in the speed of Venus's zonal winds and appears to rise and fall in time with the Sun's 11-year sunspot cycle.

The existence of lightning in the atmosphere of Venus has been controversial since the first suspected bursts were detected by the Soviet Venera probes. In 2006–07, Venus Express clearly detected whistler mode waves, the signatures of lightning. Their intermittent appearance indicates a pattern associated with weather activity. According to these measurements, the lightning rate is at least half that on Earth, however other instruments have not detected lightning at all. The origin of any lightning remains unclear, but could originate from clouds or Venusian volcanoes.

In 2007, Venus Express discovered that a huge double atmospheric polar vortex exists at the south pole. Venus Express discovered, in 2011, that an ozone layer exists high in the atmosphere of Venus. In 2013 ESA scientists reported that the ionosphere of Venus streams outwards in a manner similar to "the ion tail seen streaming from a comet under similar conditions."

In December 2015, and to a lesser extent in April and May 2016, researchers working on Japan's Akatsuki mission observed bow-shaped objects in the atmosphere of Venus. This was considered direct evidence of the existence of perhaps the largest stationary gravity waves in the solar system.

The colour and sound of the atmosphere at the surface have been recorded, with the sky having an orange-yellow colour, fading to white at higher altitudes.

== Orbit and rotation ==
Venus is the second planet from the Sun, making a full orbit in about 224 days.

Venus orbits the Sun at an average distance of about 0.72 AU (108 million km; 67 million mi), and completes an orbit every 224.7 days. It completes 13 orbits in 7.998 years, so its position in our sky almost repeats every eight years. Although all planetary orbits are elliptical, Venus's orbit is currently the closest to circular, with an eccentricity of less than 0.01. Simulations of the early solar system orbital dynamics have shown that the eccentricity of the Venus orbit may have been substantially larger in the past, reaching values as high as 0.31 and possibly impacting early climate evolution.

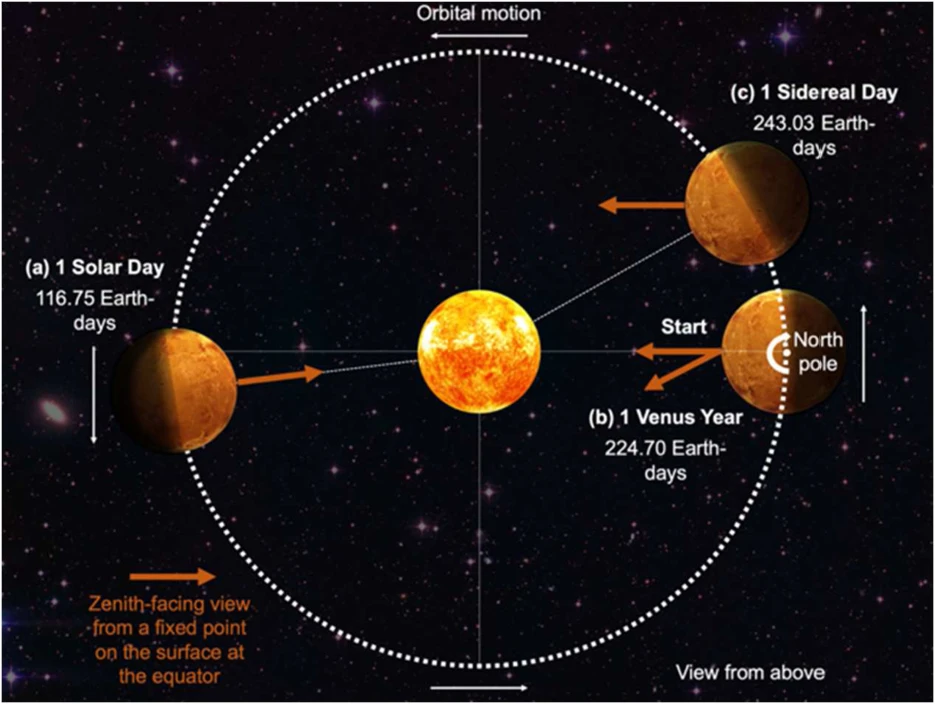
Venus and its rotation in respect to its revolution

Venus has retrograde rotation, meaning that unlike most planets, including Earth, it rotates clockwise around its own axis, opposite to its anticlockwise rotation around the Sun. Therefore, Venusian sidereal day, 243 Earth days, lasts longer than a Venusian year, 224.7 Earth days. If Venus were tidally locked to the Sun, it would always have the same face pointed to the Sun and its sidereal day would be 224.7 days. However, Venus's atmosphere is massive and it is close to the Sun, so differential heating of the atmosphere gives Venus a small retrograde rotation. The day length also fluctuates by up to 20 minutes for the same reason. Venus's rotation period measured with Magellan spacecraft data over a 500-day period is smaller than the rotation period measured during the 16-year period between the Magellan spacecraft and Venus Express visits, with a difference of about 6.5 minutes. Because of the retrograde rotation, the length of a solar day on Venus is significantly shorter than the sidereal day, at 116.75 Earth days. One Venusian year is about 1.92 Venusian solar days. To an observer on the surface of Venus, the Sun would rise in the west and set in the east, although Venus's opaque clouds prevent observing the Sun from the planet's surface.

Venus may have formed from the solar nebula with a different rotation period and obliquity, reaching its current state because of chaotic spin changes caused by planetary perturbations and tidal effects on its dense atmosphere, a change that would have occurred over the course of billions of years. The rotation period of Venus may represent an equilibrium state between tidal locking to the Sun's gravitation, which tends to slow rotation, and an atmospheric tide created by solar heating of the thick Venusian atmosphere. The 584-day average interval between successive close approaches to Earth is almost exactly equal to 5 Venusian solar days (5.001444 to be precise), but the hypothesis of a spin-orbit resonance with Earth has been discounted.

Venus has no natural satellites. It has several trojan asteroids: the quasi-satellite 524522 Zoozve and two other temporary trojans, 2001 CK_{32} and 2012 XE133. In the 17th century, Giovanni Cassini reported a moon orbiting Venus, which was named Neith and numerous sightings were reported over the following 200 years, but most were determined to be stars in the vicinity. Alex Alemi's and David Stevenson's 2006 study of models of the early Solar System at the California Institute of Technology shows Venus likely had at least one moon created by a huge impact event billions of years ago. About 10 million years later, according to the study, another impact reversed the planet's spin direction and the resulting tidal deceleration caused the Venusian moon gradually to spiral inward until it collided with Venus. If later impacts created moons, these were removed in the same way. An alternative explanation for the lack of satellites is the effect of strong solar tides, which can destabilize large satellites orbiting the inner terrestrial planets.

The orbital space of Venus has a dust ring-cloud, with a suspected origin either from Venus–trailing asteroids, interplanetary dust migrating in waves, or the remains of the Solar System's original circumstellar disc that formed the planetary system.

=== Orbit in respect to Earth ===
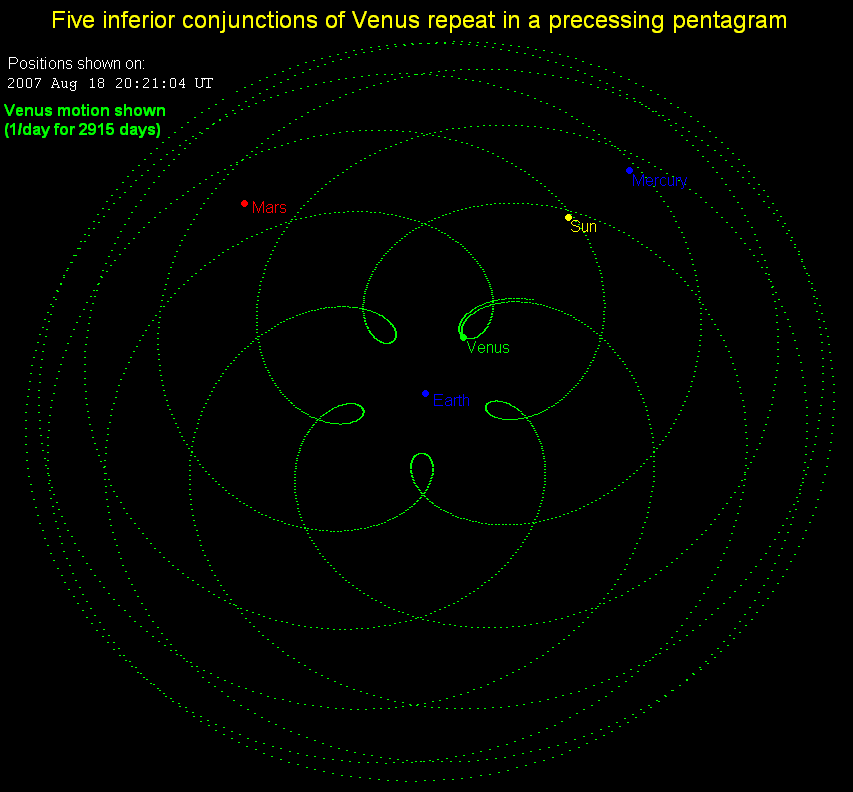
Earth is positioned at the centre of the diagram, and the curve represents the direction and distance of Venus as a function of time.

Earth and Venus have a near orbital resonance of 13:8 (Earth orbits eight times for every 13 orbits of Venus). Therefore, they approach each other and reach inferior conjunction in synodic periods of 584 days, on average. The path that Venus makes in relation to Earth viewed geocentrically draws a pentagram over five synodic periods, shifting every period by 144°. This pentagram of Venus is sometimes referred to as the petals of Venus due to the path's visual similarity to a flower.

When Venus lies between Earth and the Sun in inferior conjunction, it makes the closest approach to Earth of any planet, at an average distance of 41 million km (25 million mi). Because of the decreasing eccentricity of Earth's orbit, the minimum distances will become greater over tens of thousands of years. From the year 1 to 5383, there are 526 approaches less than 40 million km (25 million mi); then, there are none for about 60,158 years.

While Venus approaches Earth the closest, Mercury is more often the closest to Earth of all planets and to any other planet. Venus has been used as a waypoint for gravity assist manoeuvres, which has been identified as a more economic way to travel to Mercury, the Sun, asteroids, Mars, Jupiter and beyond.

Tidally Venus exerts the third strongest tidal force on Earth, after the Moon and the Sun, though significantly less.

== Observability ==
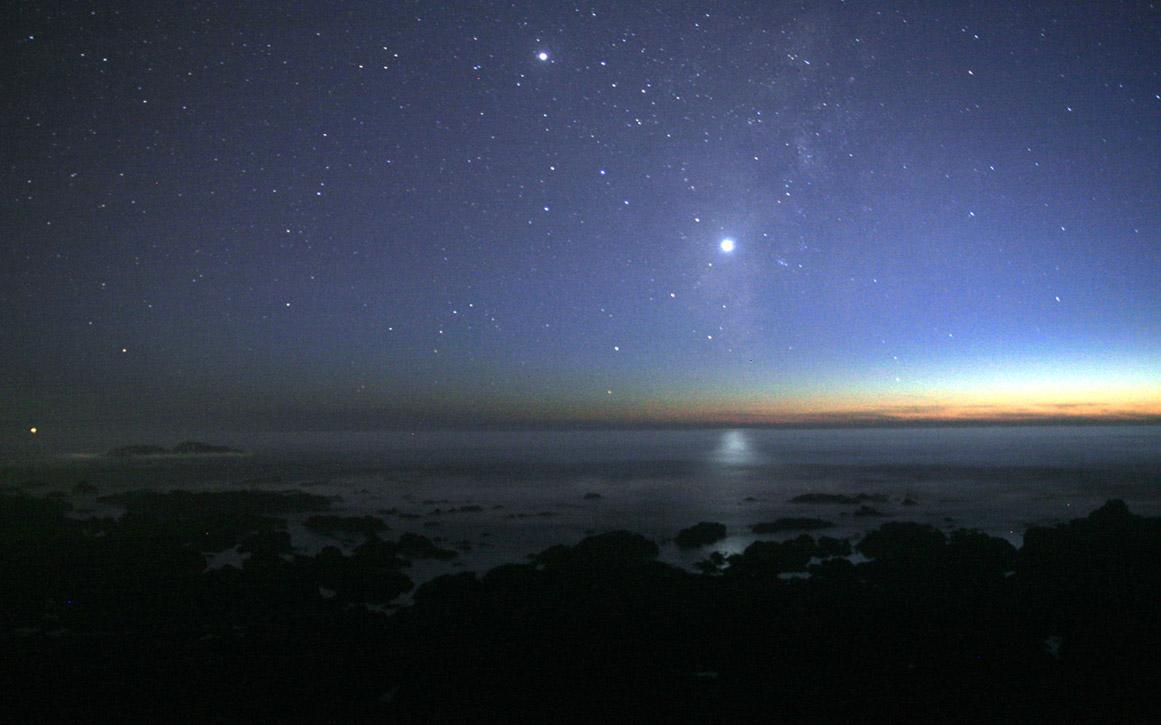
Venus, pictured centre-right, is always brighter than all other planets or stars at their maximal brightness, as seen from Earth. Jupiter is visible at the top of the image.

To the naked eye, Venus appears as a white point of light with a maximum apparent magnitude of −4.92, brighter than any other planet or star apart from the Sun, even when faintest during its transit with an apparent magnitude of −2.98. The planet's mean apparent magnitude is −4.14 with a standard deviation of 0.31. The brightest magnitude occurs during the crescent phase about one month before or after an inferior conjunction. Venus fades to about magnitude −3 when it is backlit by the Sun, although the exact value depends on the phase angle. The planet is bright enough to be seen in broad daylight, but is more easily visible when the Sun is low on the horizon or setting. As an inferior planet, it always lies within about 47° of the Sun.

Venus "overtakes" Earth every 584 days as it orbits the Sun. As it does so, it changes from the "Evening Star", visible after sunset, to the "Morning Star", visible before sunrise. Although Mercury, the other inferior planet, reaches a maximum elongation of only 28° and is often difficult to discern in twilight, Venus is hard to miss when it is at its brightest. Its greater maximum elongation means it is visible in dark skies long after sunset. As the brightest point-like object in the sky, Venus is a commonly misreported "unidentified flying object".

Because Venus comes close to the earth at inferior conjunction and has an orbit inclined to the plane of the earth's orbit, it can appear more than 8° north or south of the ecliptic, more than any other planet or the moon. Every eight years around March it appears this far north of the ecliptic, in Pisces (such as in mid-March 2025), and every eight years it appears this far south of the ecliptic in August or September in Virgo (as in late August 2023). Venus can thus be north of the sun and appear as a morning star and an evening star on the same day, in the northern hemisphere. The timing of these north or south excursions becomes slowly earlier in the year, and over thirty cycles (240 years) the cycle is gradually replaced by another cycle offset by three years, so the situation returns close to the original situation after 243 orbits of Earth, 395 of Venus.

Lunar occultations of Venus, in which the moon blocks the view of Venus for observers in certain parts of the earth, occur on average about twice a year, sometimes several times in a year (though rarely).

=== Phases ===
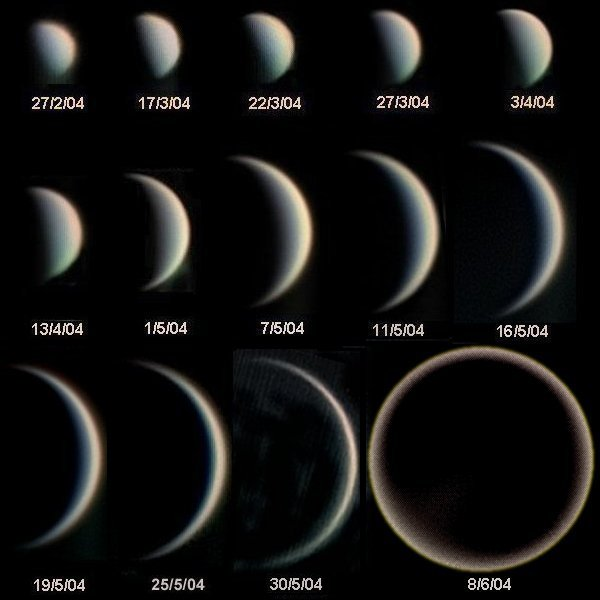
The phases of Venus and evolution of its apparent diameter

As it orbits the Sun, Venus displays phases like those of the Moon in a telescopic view. The planet appears as a small and "full" disc when it is on the opposite side of the Sun (at superior conjunction). Venus shows a larger disc and "quarter phase" at its maximum elongations from the Sun, and appears at its brightest in the night sky. The planet presents a much larger thin "crescent" in telescopic views as it passes along the near side between Earth and the Sun. Venus displays its largest size and "new phase" when it is between Earth and the Sun (at inferior conjunction). Its atmosphere is visible through telescopes by the halo of sunlight refracted around it. The phases are clearly visible in a 4" telescope.

=== Daylight apparitions ===
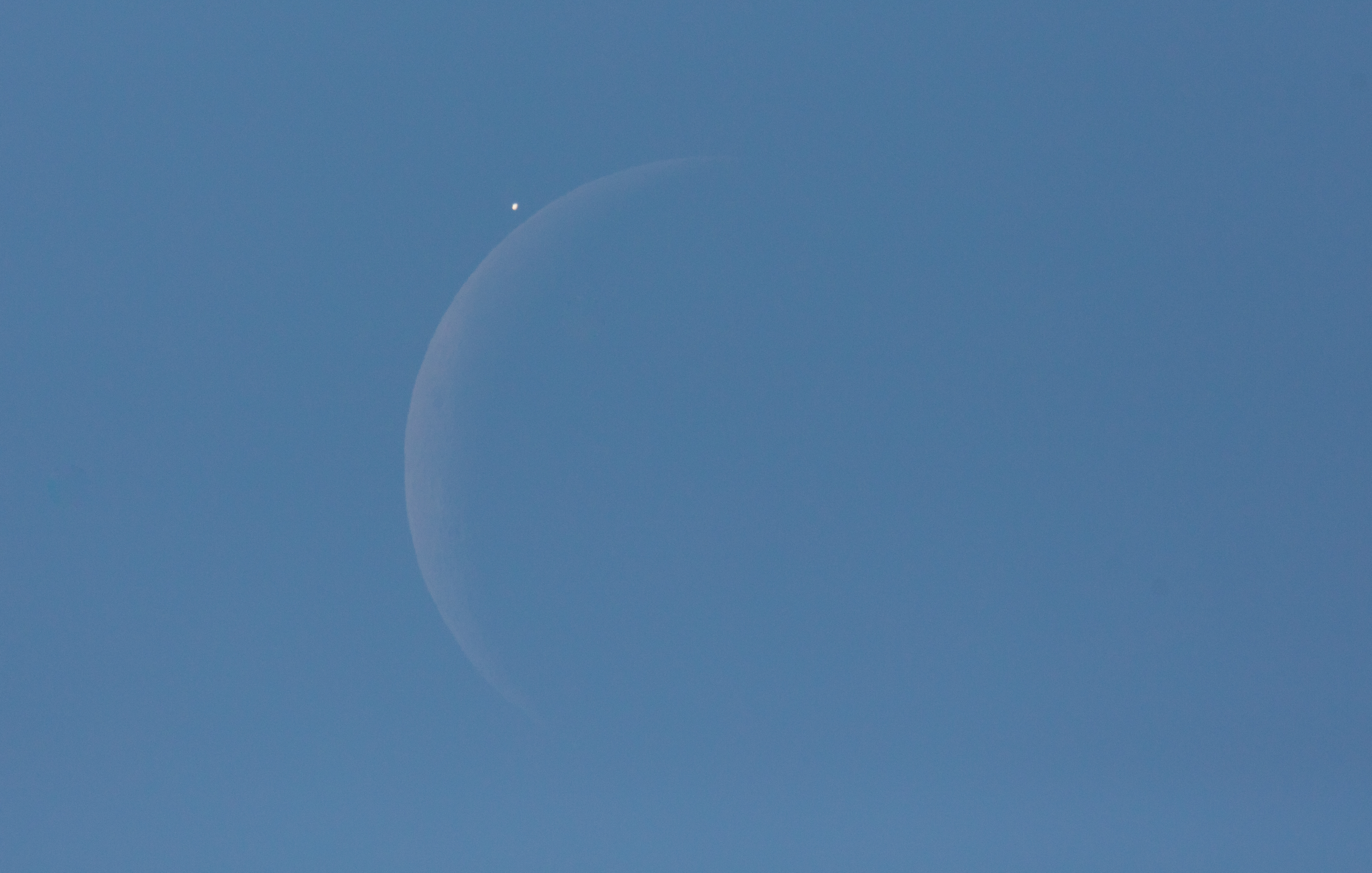
Venus is often visible to the naked eye in daytime, as seen just prior to the lunar occultation of 7 December 2015.

When Venus is sufficiently bright with enough angular distance from the sun, it is easily observed in a clear daytime sky with the naked eye, though most people do not know to look for it. Astronomer Edmund Halley calculated its maximum naked eye brightness in 1716, when many Londoners were alarmed by its appearance in the daytime. French emperor Napoleon Bonaparte once witnessed a daytime apparition of the planet while at a reception in Luxembourg. Another historical daytime observation of the planet took place during the inauguration of the American president Abraham Lincoln in Washington, D.C., on 4 March 1865.

=== Transits ===
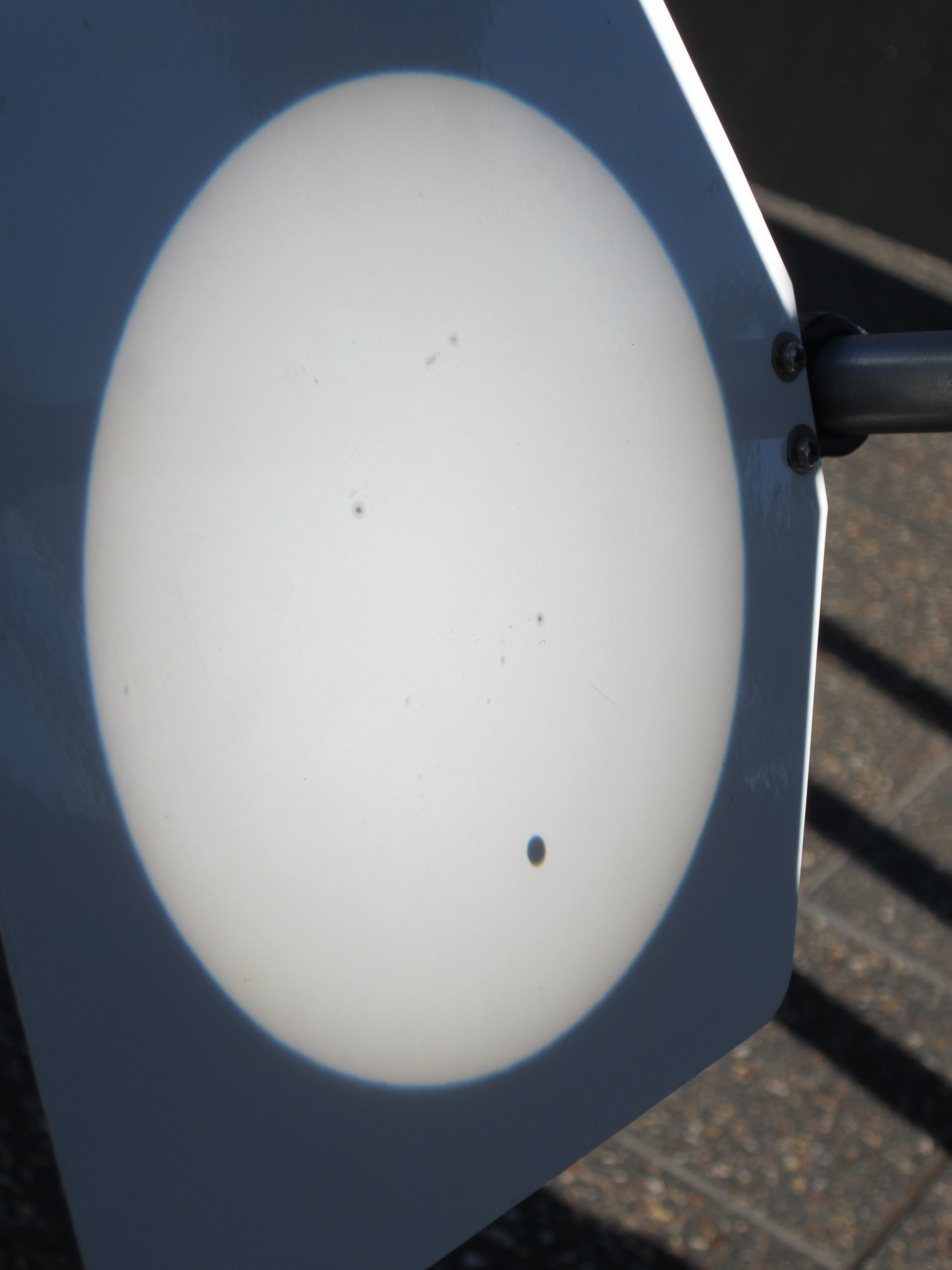
2012 transit of Venus, projected by a telescope onto a white card

A transit of Venus is the appearance of Venus in front of the Sun, during inferior conjunction. Since the orbit of Venus is slightly inclined relative to Earth's orbit, most inferior conjunctions with Earth, which occur every synodic period of 1.6 years, do not produce a transit of Venus. Consequently, Venus transits only occur when an inferior conjunction takes place during some days of June or December, when the orbits of Venus and Earth cross a straight line with the Sun. This results in Venus transiting above Earth in a sequence currently of 8 years, 105.5 years, 8 years and 121.5 years, forming cycles of 243 years.

Historically, transits of Venus were important, because they allowed astronomers to determine the size of the astronomical unit, and hence the size of the Solar System as shown by Jeremiah Horrocks in 1639 with the first known observation of a Venus transit (after history's first observed planetary transit in 1631, of Mercury).

Only seven Venus transits have been observed so far, since their occurrences were calculated in 1621 by Johannes Kepler. Captain Cook sailed to Tahiti in 1768 to record the third observed transit of Venus, which subsequently resulted in the exploration of the east coast of Australia.

The latest pair was 8 June 2004 and 5–6 June 2012. The transit could be watched live from many online outlets or observed locally with the right equipment and conditions. The preceding pair of transits occurred in December 1874 and December 1882.

The next transits will occur in December 2117 and December 2125.

=== Ashen light ===
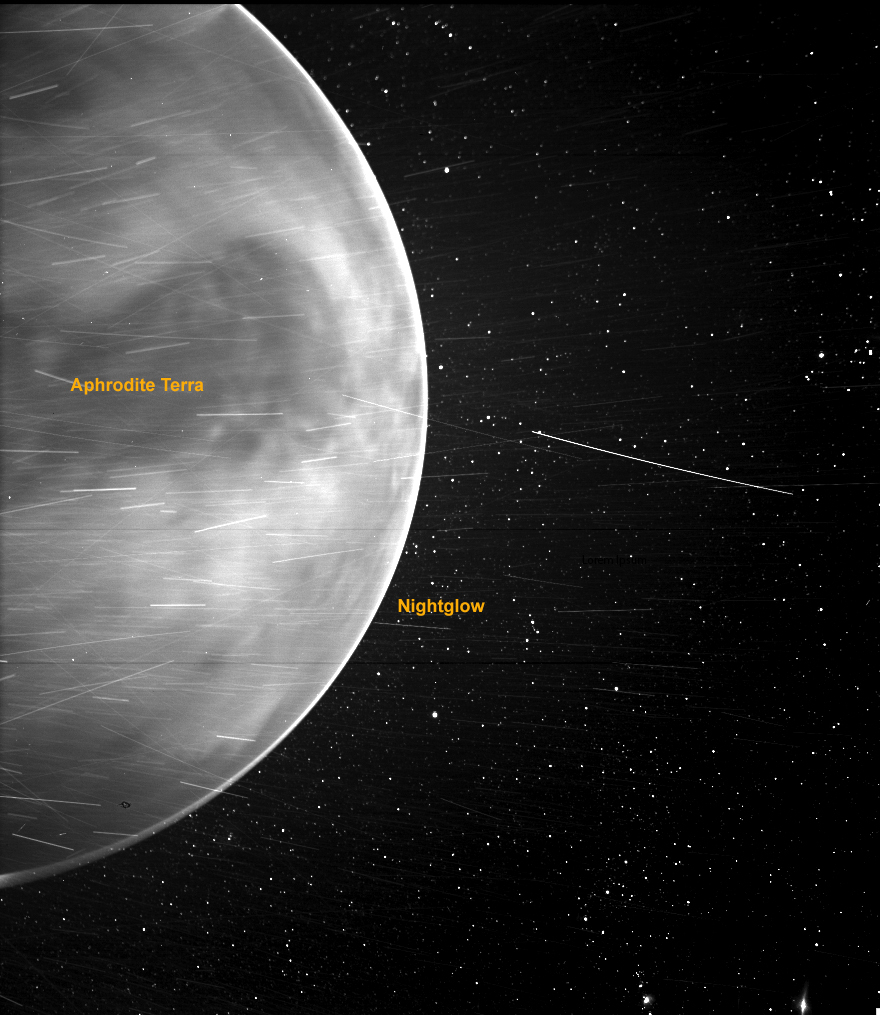
Visible light to near-infrared image of the night side of Venus showing nightglow.

A long-standing mystery of Venus observations is ashen light, an apparent weak illumination of its dark side, seen when the planet is in the crescent phase. The first claimed observation of ashen light was made in 1643, but the existence of the illumination has never been reliably confirmed. Observers have speculated it may result from electrical activity in the Venusian atmosphere, but it could be illusory, resulting from the physiological effect of observing a bright, crescent-shaped object. In 2022, images of the night side of Venus with the Wide-Field Imager for Parker Solar Probe showed nightglow, leading to the suggestion that this effect, similar to auroras, explains the ashen light.

== Observation and exploration history ==
=== Early observation ===
Venus is in Earth's sky bright enough to be visible without aid, making it one of the classical planets that human cultures have known and identified throughout history, particularly for being the third brightest object in Earth's sky after the Sun and the Moon. Because the movements of Venus appear to be discontinuous (it disappears due to its proximity to the sun, for many days at a time, and then reappears on the other horizon), some cultures did not recognize Venus as a single entity; instead, they assumed it to be two separate stars on each horizon: the morning and evening star. Nonetheless, a cylinder seal from the Jemdet Nasr period and the Venus tablet of Ammisaduqa from the First Babylonian dynasty indicate that the ancient Sumerians already knew that the morning and evening stars were the same celestial object.

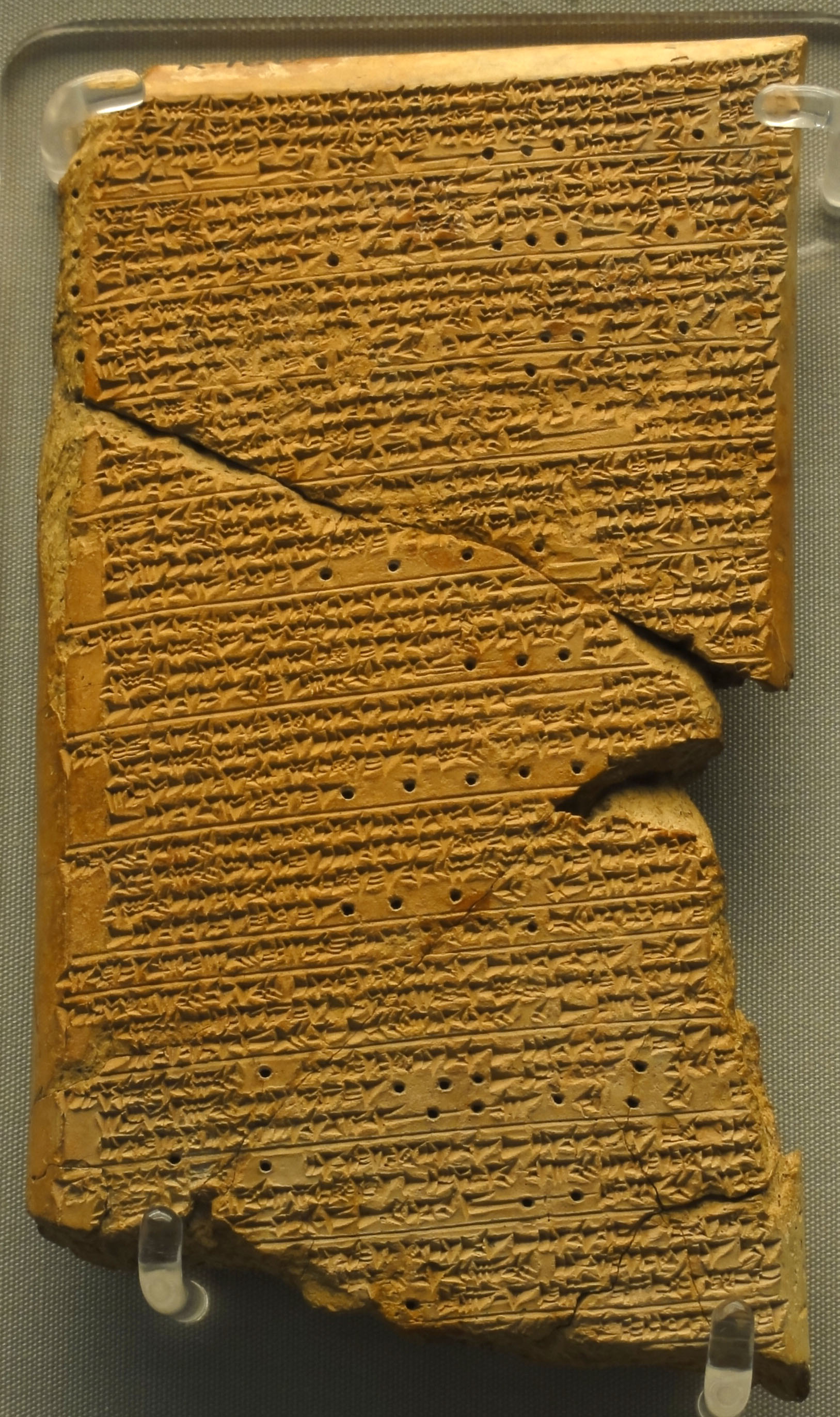
Oldest known recording of Venus positions, on the Babylonian Venus tablet of Ammisaduqa (1600 BC)

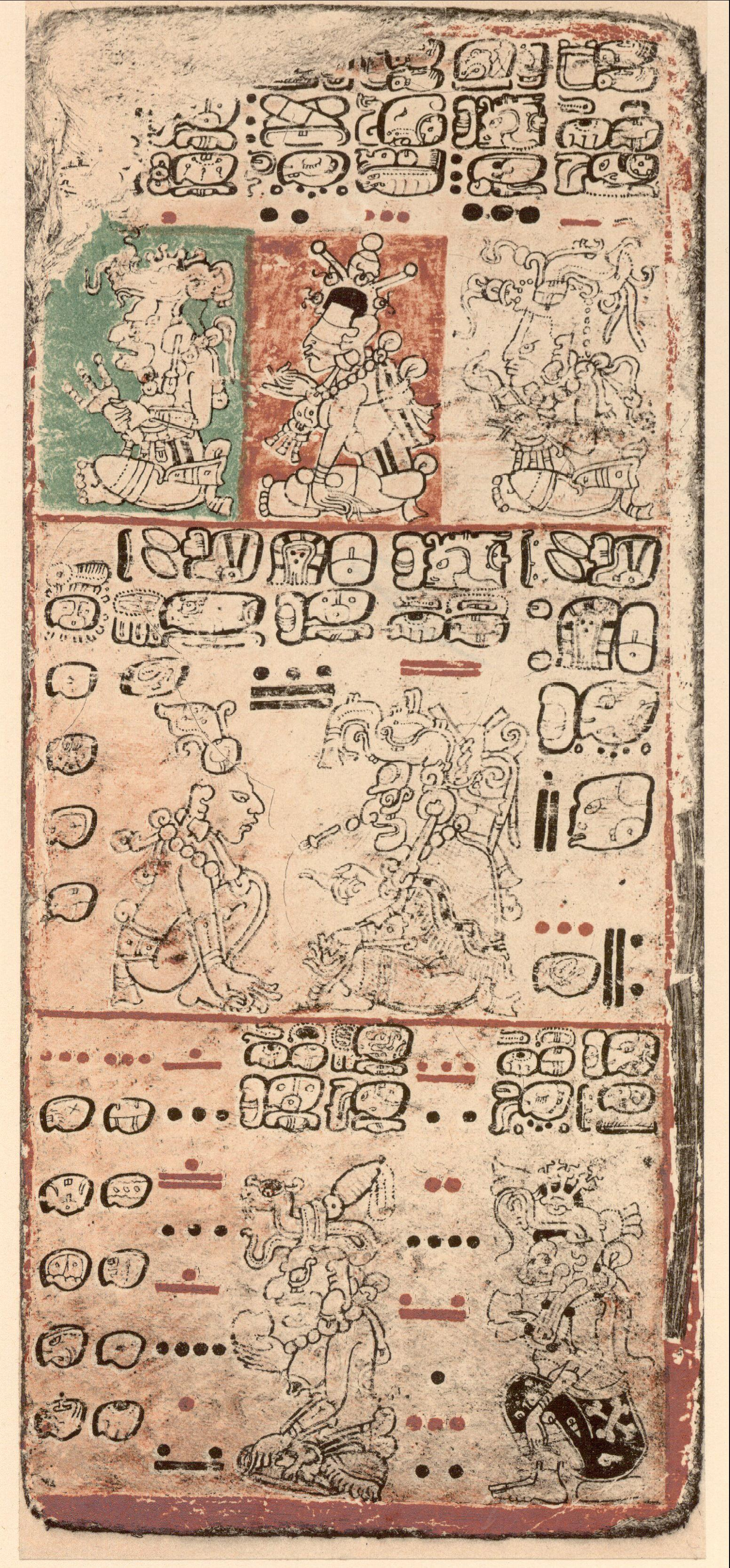
The Pre-Columbian Mayan Dresden Codex, which calculates appearances of Venus

In the Old Babylonian period, the planet Venus was known as Ninsi'anna, and later as Dilbat. The name "Ninsi'anna" translates to "divine lady, illumination of heaven", which refers to Venus as the brightest visible "star". Earlier spellings of the name were written with the cuneiform sign si4 (= SU, meaning "to be red"), and the original meaning may have been "divine lady of the redness of heaven", in reference to the colour of the morning and evening sky.

The Chinese historically referred to the morning Venus as "the Great White" (Tàibái 太白) or "the Opener (Starter) of Brightness" (Qǐmíng 啟明), and the evening Venus as "the Excellent West One" (Chánggēng 長庚).

The ancient Greeks initially believed Venus to be two separate stars: Phosphorus, the morning star, and Hesperus, the evening star. Pliny the Elder credited the realization that they were a single object to Pythagoras in the sixth century BC, while Diogenes Laërtius argued that Parmenides (early fifth century) was probably responsible for this discovery. Though they recognized Venus as a single object, the ancient Romans continued to designate the morning aspect of Venus as Lucifer, literally "Light-Bringer", and the evening aspect as Vesper, both of which are literal translations of their traditional Greek names.

In the second century, in his astronomical treatise Almagest, Ptolemy theorized that both Mercury and Venus were located between the Sun and the Earth. The 11th-century Persian astronomer Avicenna claimed to have observed a transit of Venus (although there is some doubt about it), which later astronomers took as confirmation of Ptolemy's theory. In the 12th century, the Andalusian astronomer Ibn Bajjah observed "two planets as black spots on the face of the Sun"; these were thought to be the transits of Venus and Mercury by 13th-century Maragha astronomer Qotb al-Din Shirazi, though this cannot be true as there were no Venus transits in Ibn Bajjah's lifetime. Several claims of transit observations made by mediaeval Islamic astronomers have been shown to be sunspots.

=== Venus and early modern astronomy ===
In 1610 Galileo Galilei observed with his telescope that Venus showed phases, despite remaining near the Sun in Earth's sky (first image). This proved that it orbits the Sun and not Earth, as predicted by Copernicus's heliocentric model and disproved Ptolemy's geocentric model (second image).

When the planet was first observed with a telescope in December 1610, by the Italian physicist Galileo Galilei, he found it showed phases like the Moon, varying from crescent to gibbous to full and vice versa. When Venus is furthest from the Sun in the sky, it shows a half-lit phase, and when it is closest to the Sun in the sky, it shows as a crescent or full phase. This could be possible only if Venus orbited the Sun, reported by Galileo in his 1613 Letters on Sunspots, becoming one of the first observations to clearly contradict the Ptolemaic geocentric model that the Solar System was concentric and centred on Earth.

The 1631 transit of Venus, while not recorded, was the first one successfully predicted, by Johannes Kepler and his calculations, which he published in 1629. The following 1639 transit of Venus was accurately predicted by Jeremiah Horrocks and observed by him and his friend, William Crabtree, at each of their respective homes, on 4 December 1639 (24 November under the Julian calendar in use at that time).

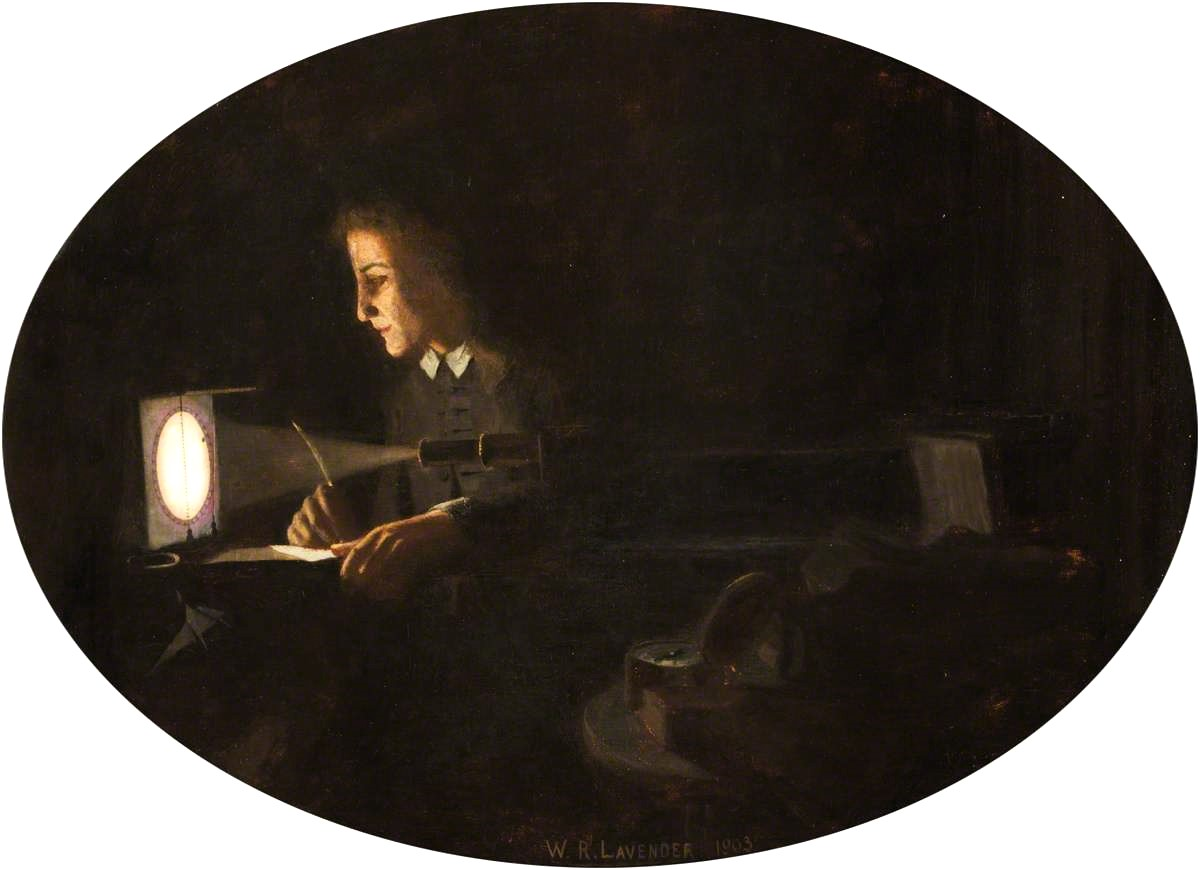
Twentieth century painting of Jeremiah Horrocks observing the 1639 transit of Venus.

The atmosphere of Venus was discovered in 1761 by Russian polymath Mikhail Lomonosov. Venus's atmosphere was observed in 1790 by German astronomer Johann Schröter. Schröter found when the planet was a thin crescent, the cusps extended through more than 180°. He correctly surmised this was due to scattering of sunlight in a dense atmosphere. Later, American astronomer Chester Smith Lyman observed a complete ring around the dark side of the planet when it was at inferior conjunction, providing further evidence for an atmosphere. The atmosphere complicated efforts to determine a rotation period for the planet, and observers such as Italian-born astronomer Giovanni Cassini and Schröter incorrectly estimated periods of about 24 h from the motions of markings on the planet's apparent surface.

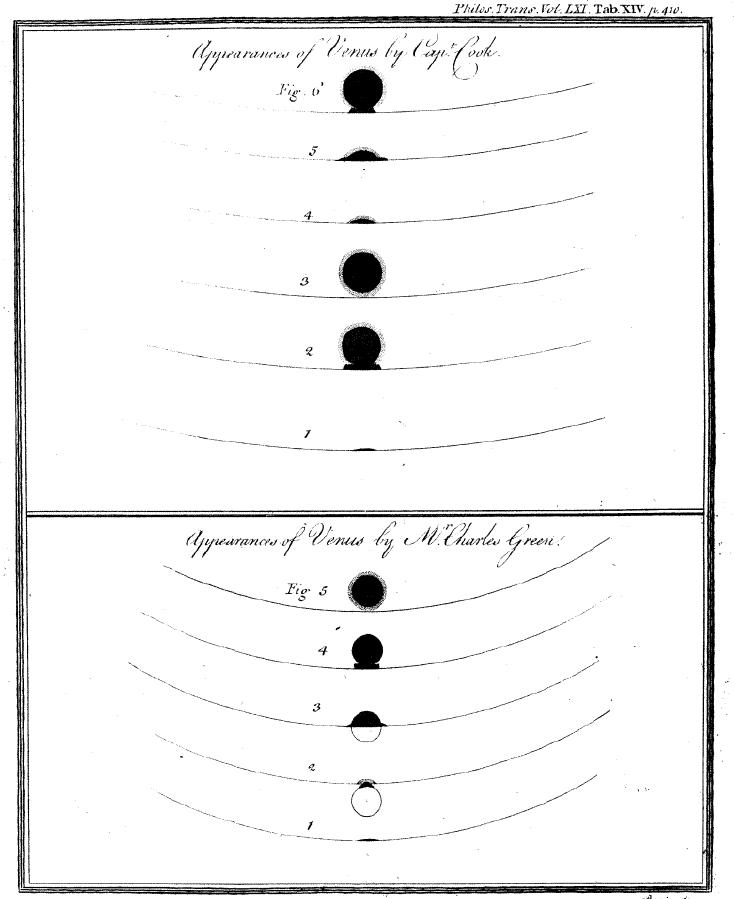
The "black drop effect" as recorded during the 1769 transit

=== Early 20th century advances ===
Little more was discovered about Venus until the 20th century. Its almost featureless disc gave no hint what its surface might be like, and it was only with the development of spectroscopic and ultraviolet observations that more of its secrets were revealed.

The first ultraviolet observations were carried out in the 1920s, when Frank E. Ross found that ultraviolet photographs revealed considerable detail that was absent in visible and infrared radiation. He suggested this was due to a dense, yellow lower atmosphere with high cirrus clouds above it.

It had been noted that Venus had no discernible oblateness in its disk, suggesting a slow rotation, and some astronomers concluded based on this that it was tidally locked like Mercury was believed to be at the time; but other researchers had detected a significant quantity of heat coming from the planet's nightside, suggesting a quick rotation (a high surface temperature was not suspected at the time), confusing the issue. Later work in the 1950s showed the rotation was retrograde.

=== First missions to Venus ===
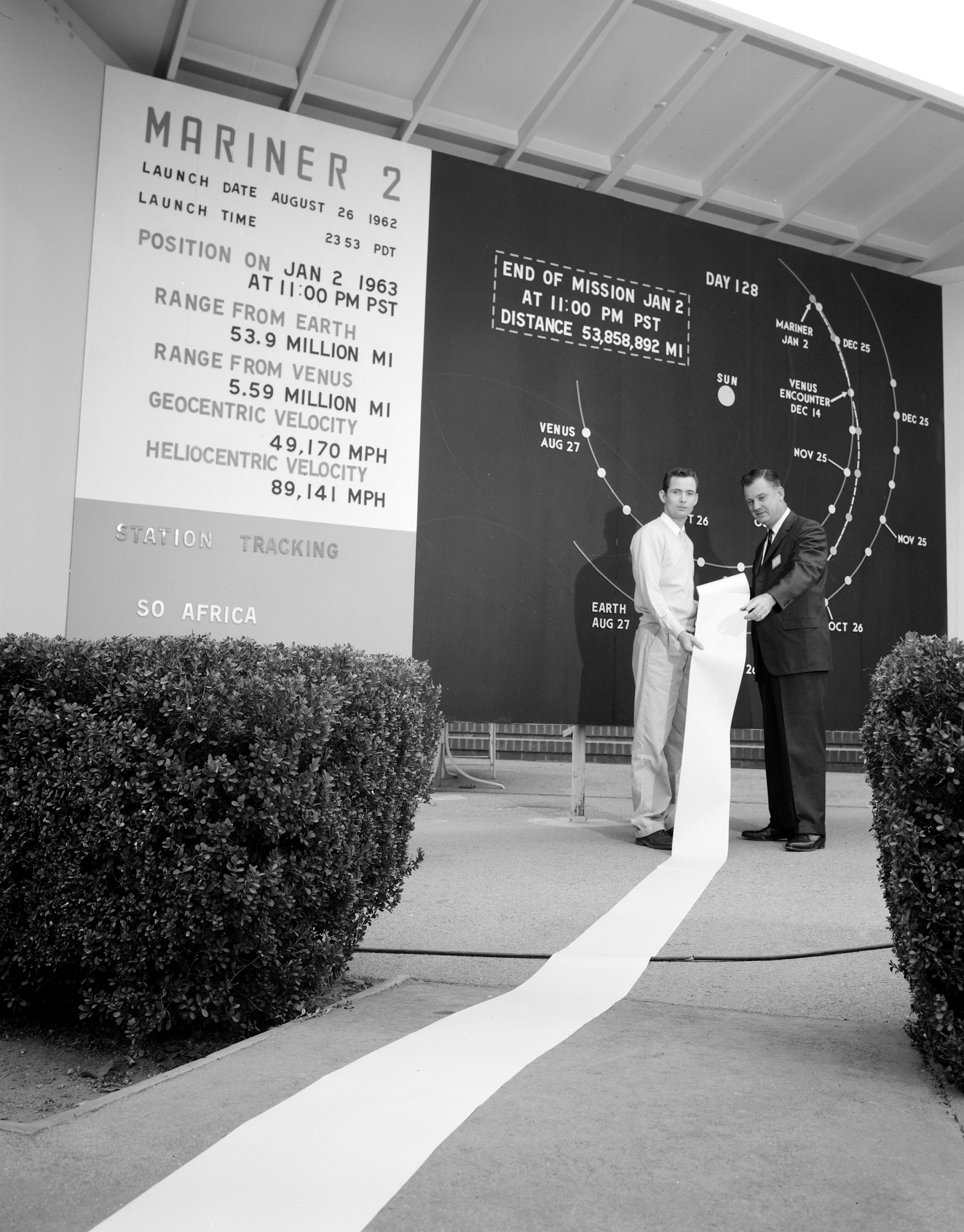
Mariner 2's fly-by was the first time data was successfully returned from Venus, which was presented at JPL with a print-out (1963)

The first interplanetary spaceflight attempt was in 1961 when the robotic space probe Venera 1 of the Soviet Venera programme flew to Venus. It lost contact en route.

The first successful interplanetary mission, also to Venus, was Mariner 2 of the United States' Mariner programme, passing on 14 December 1962 at 34,833 km (21,644 mi) above the surface of Venus and gathering data on the planet's atmosphere.

Additionally radar observations of Venus were first carried out in the 1960s, and provided the first measurements of the rotation period, which were close to the actual value.

Venera 3, launched in 1966, became humanity's first probe and lander to reach and impact another celestial body other than the Moon, but could not return data as it crashed into the surface of Venus. In 1967, Venera 4 was launched and successfully deployed science experiments in the Venusian atmosphere before impacting. Venera 4 showed the surface temperature was hotter than Mariner 2 had calculated, at almost 500 °C (932 °F), determined that the atmosphere was 95% carbon dioxide (CO_{2}), and discovered that Venus's atmosphere was considerably denser than Venera 4's designers had anticipated.

In an early example of space cooperation the data of Venera 4 was joined with the 1967 Mariner 5 data, analysed by a combined Soviet–American science team in a series of colloquia over the following year.

On 15 December 1970, Venera 7 became the first spacecraft to soft land on another planet and the first to transmit data from there back to Earth.

In 1974, Mariner 10 swung by Venus to bend its path towards Mercury and took ultraviolet photographs of the clouds, revealing the extraordinarily high wind speeds in the Venusian atmosphere. This was the first interplanetary gravity assist ever used, a technique which would be used by later probes.

Radar observations in the 1970s revealed details of the Venusian surface for the first time. Pulses of radio waves were beamed at the planet using the 300 m (1,000 ft) radio telescope at Arecibo Observatory, and the echoes revealed two highly reflective regions, designated the Alpha and Beta regions. The observations revealed a bright region attributed to mountains, which was called Maxwell Montes. These three features are now the only ones on Venus that do not have female names.

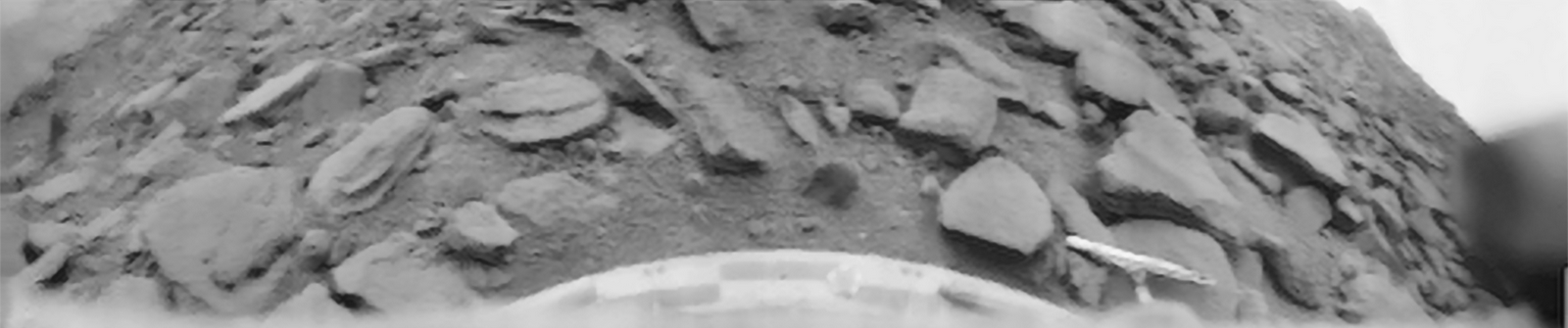
First view of Venus's surface as well as any other planet than Earth (1975, Soviet Venera 9 lander). Black-and-white 180-degree panorama of barren, black, slate-like rocks against a flat sky. The ground and the probe are the focus.

In 1975, the Soviet Venera 9 and 10 landers transmitted the first images from the surface of Venus, which were in black and white. NASA obtained additional data with the Pioneer Venus project, consisting of two separate missions: the Pioneer Venus Multiprobe and Pioneer Venus Orbiter, orbiting Venus between 1978 and 1992. In 1982 the first monochrome colour filters images of the surface were obtained with the Soviet Venera 13 and 14 landers. After Venera 15 and 16 operated between 1983 and 1984 in orbit, conducting detailed mapping of 25% of Venus's terrain (from the north pole to 30°N latitude), the Soviet Venera programme came to a close.

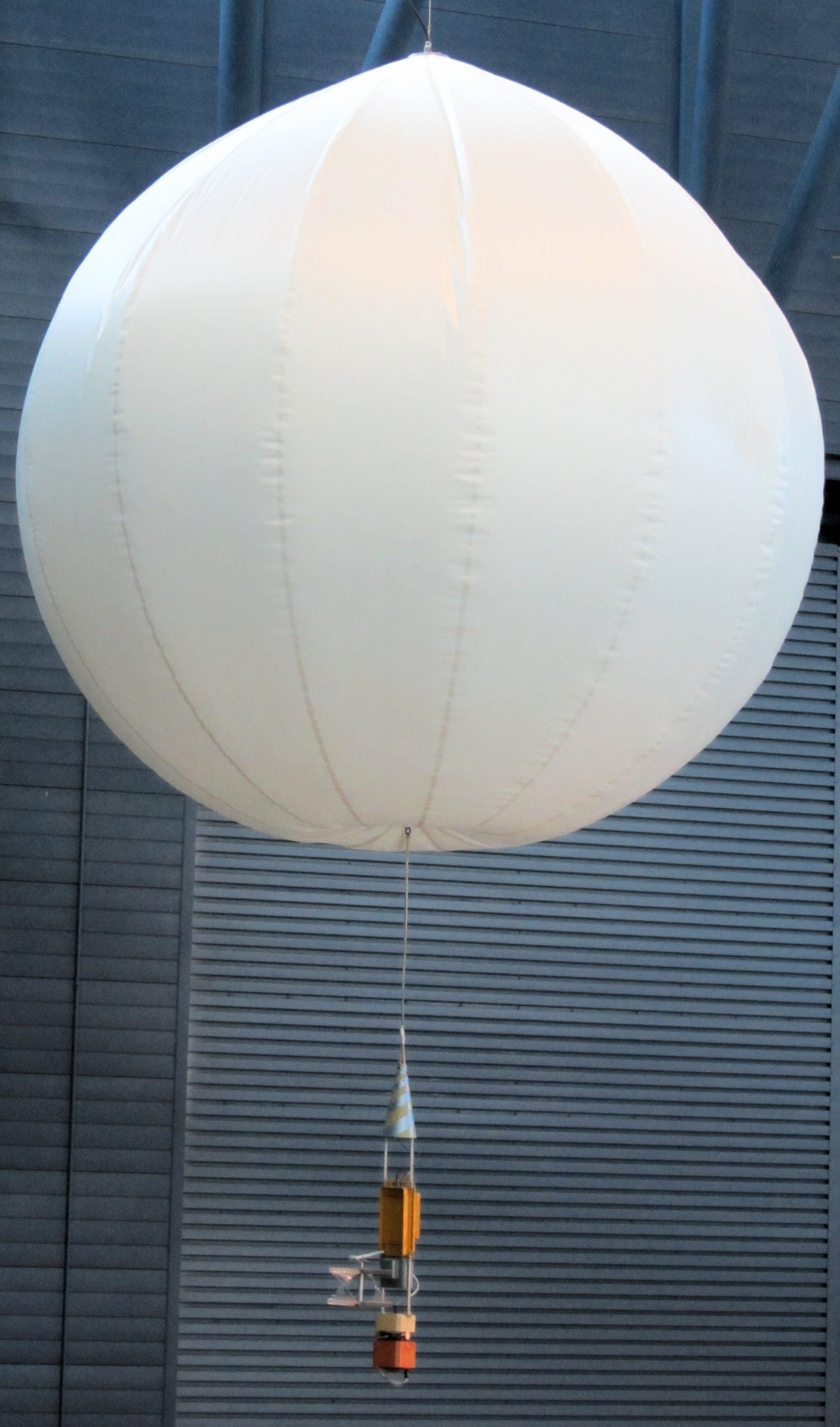
Vega balloon probe on display at the Udvar-Hazy Center of the Smithsonian Institution

In 1985 the Soviet Vega programme with its Vega 1 and Vega 2 missions carried the last entry probes and carried the first ever extraterrestrial aerobots for the first time achieving atmospheric flight outside Earth by employing inflatable balloons.

Between 1990 and 1994, Magellan operated in orbit until deorbiting, mapping the surface of Venus. Furthermore, probes like Galileo (1990), and Cassini–Huygens (1998/1999) visited Venus with flybys en route to other destinations.

=== Renewed exploration ===
In April 2006, Venus Express, the first dedicated Venus mission by the European Space Agency (ESA), entered orbit around Venus. Venus Express provided unprecedented observation of Venus's atmosphere. ESA concluded the Venus Express mission in December 2014 deorbiting it in January 2015. The same and following year MESSENGER visited Venus with flybys en route to other destinations.

In 2010, the first successful interplanetary solar sail spacecraft IKAROS travelled to Venus for a flyby.

Between 2015 and 2024 Japan's Akatsuki probe was active in orbit around Venus and BepiColombo performed flybys in 2020/2021.

WISPR of the Parker Solar Probe took this visible light footage of the nightside in 2021, showing the hot faintly glowing surface, and its Aphrodite Terra as large dark patch, through the clouds, which prohibit such observations on the dayside when they are illuminated.

=== Active and planned missions ===
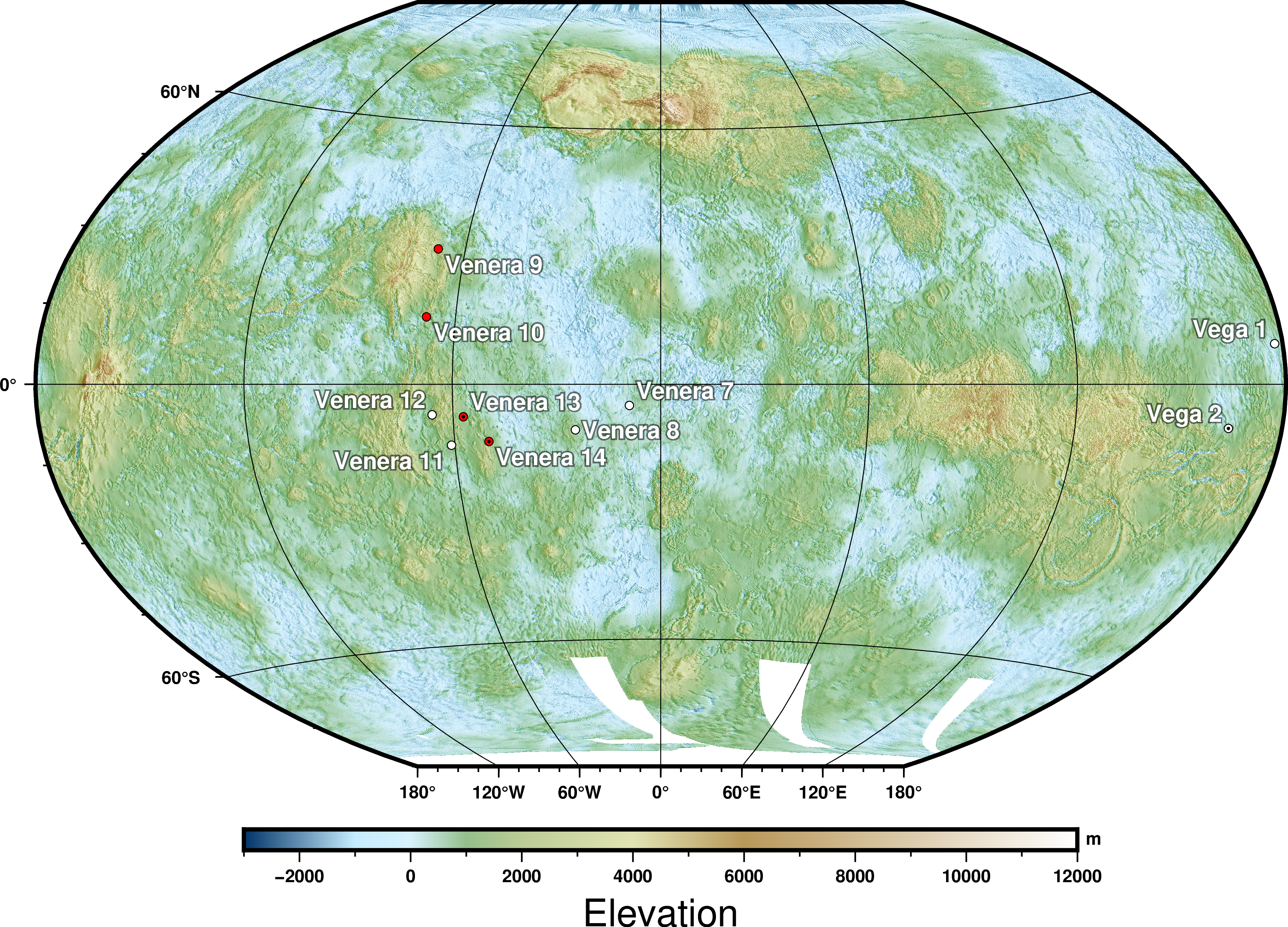
Global topographic map of Venus, with all probe landing sites marked (red: images returned; black dot: samples taken and on-site analysed)

As of 2025 there are no active probes at Venus, with Parker Solar Probe scheduled to return repeatedly to Venus until 2030.

Several probes are under development as well as multiple proposed missions still in their early conceptual stages. The next Venus mission scheduled is the Venus Life Finder, expected to launch not earlier than summer 2026.

Indian ISRO is working on Venus Orbiter Mission, aiming to launch it in 2028. UAE mission to asteroids, MBR Explorer, will perform a flyby of the planet. NASA approved two missions to the planet, VERITAS and DAVINCI, planned to be launched not earlier than 2031. ESA plans to launch EnVision also in 2031.

A project by the MIT with the rocket company Rocket Lab aims to be the first private interplanetary space craft with a proposal to look for organics by entering the atmosphere of Venus with a probe named Venus Life Finder.

==== Objectives ====
Venus has been identified for future research as an important case for understanding:

- the origins of the solar system and Earth, and if systems and planets like ours are common or rare in the universe.
- how planetary bodies evolve from their primordial states to today's diverse objects.
- the development of conditions leading to habitable environments and life.

=== Crewed mission concepts ===
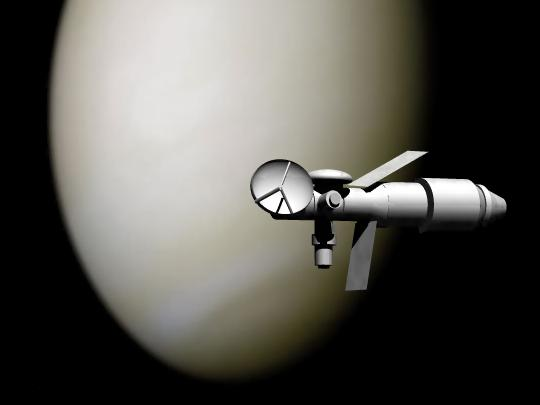
In the 1970s the United States and the Soviet Union both designed crewed Venus missions, like the Apollo program derived Manned Venus Flyby design, or the depicted, the proposed Soviet TMK-MAVR craft on a Venus flyby

Venus has been considered since the 1960s as a waypoint for crewed missions to Mars through opposition missions instead of direct conjunction missions with Venus gravity assist flybys, demonstrating that they should be quicker and safer missions to Mars, with better return or abort flight windows, and less or the same amount of radiation exposure from the flight as direct Mars flights.

==== Possible atmospheric habitation ====
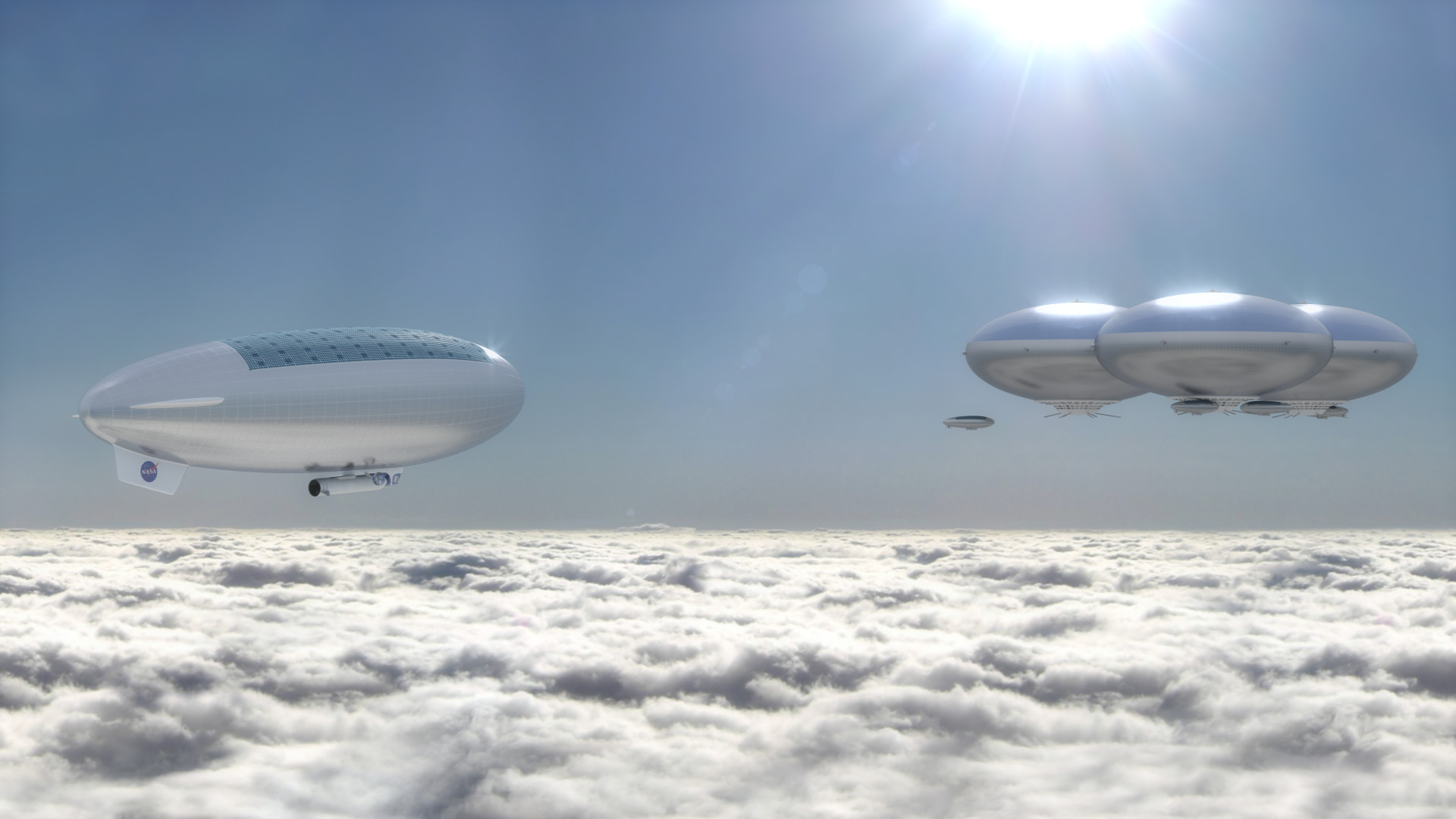
Artist's rendering of a NASA High Altitude Venus Operational Concept (HAVOC) crewed floating outpost on Venus

While the surface conditions of Venus are extremely hostile, the atmospheric pressure, temperature, and solar and cosmic radiation 50 km above the surface are similar to those at Earth's surface ("clement conditions"). Among the many engineering challenges for any human presence in the atmosphere of Venus are the corrosive amounts of sulfuric acid in the atmosphere. Aerostats for crewed exploration and possibly for permanent "floating cities" in the Venusian atmosphere have been proposed as an alternative to the popular idea of living on planetary surfaces such as Mars. NASA's High Altitude Venus Operational Concept was a training concept to study a crewed aerostat design.

== Possibility of life ==
Although the surface conditions on Venus are no longer hospitable to any terrestrial-like life that might have formed before this event, there is speculation that life may exist in the upper cloud layers of Venus, 50 km (30 mi) above the surface, where atmospheric conditions are the most Earth-like in the Solar System, with temperatures ranging between 303 and 353 K (30 and 80 °C; 86 and 176 °F), and the pressure and radiation being about the same as at Earth's surface, but with acidic clouds and the carbon dioxide air. More specifically, between heights of 48 and 59 km temperature and radiation conditions are suitable for life. At lower elevations water would evaporate and at higher elevation UV radiation would be too strong.

Speculation on the possibility of life on Venus's surface decreased significantly after the early 1960s when it became clear that conditions were extreme compared to those on Earth. Venus's extreme temperatures and atmospheric pressure make water-based life, as currently known, unlikely.

Some scientists have speculated that thermoacidophilic extremophile microorganisms might exist in the cooler, acidic upper layers of the Venusian atmosphere. Such speculations go back to 1967, when Carl Sagan and Harold J. Morowitz suggested in a Nature article that tiny objects detected in Venus's clouds might be organisms similar to Earth's bacteria (which are of approximately the same size):

While the surface conditions of Venus make the hypothesis of life there implausible, the clouds of Venus are a different story altogether. As was pointed out some years ago, water, carbon dioxide and sunlight—the prerequisites for photosynthesis—are plentiful in the vicinity of the clouds.

In August 2019, astronomers led by Yeon Joo Lee reported that long-term pattern of absorbance and albedo changes in the atmosphere of the planet Venus caused by "unknown absorbers", which may be chemicals or even large colonies of microorganisms high up in the atmosphere of the planet, affect the climate. Their light absorbance is almost identical to that of micro-organisms in Earth's clouds. Similar conclusions have been reached by other studies.

The putative detection of an absorption line of phosphine in Venus's atmosphere, a gas not known to be produced by any known chemical processes on the Venusian surface or atmosphere, led to speculation in September 2020 that there could be extant life currently present in the atmosphere. Later research attributed the spectroscopic signal that was interpreted as phosphine to sulphur dioxide, or found that in fact there was no absorption line.

=== Planetary protection ===
Due to the harsh surface environment of Venus, Venus has been under the planetary protection category two, the second lowest. This gives it only a remote chance that spacecraft-borne interplanetary contamination could compromise investigations.

However, with findings of potential biosignatures this categorization for at least some atmospheric layers has been called into question, but since these layers have not been identified as sufficiently conducive to life, adjusting the categorization has not been recommended.

== In culture ==
Venus is among the most prominent features in the night sky, and has been treated as particularly important in mythology, astrology and fiction across many different cultures.

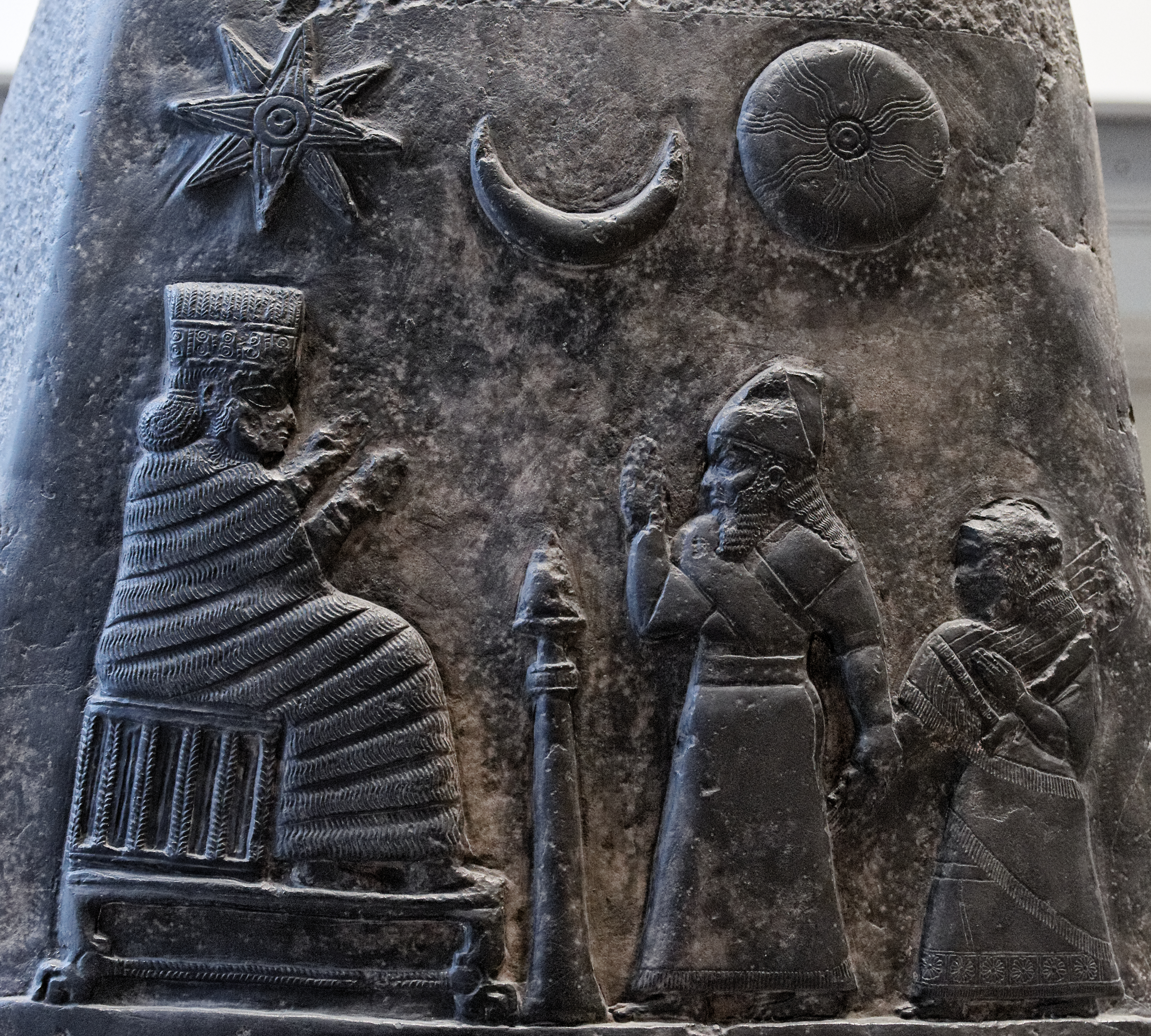
The eight-pointed star is a symbol used in some cultures to represent Venus, sometimes combined into a star and crescent arrangement. Here, the eight pointed star is the Star of Ishtar, the Babylonian Venus goddess, alongside the solar disk of her brother Shamash and the crescent moon of their father Sin on a boundary stone of Meli-Shipak II, dating to the 12th century BC.

Several hymns praise Inanna in her role as the goddess of the planet Venus. Theology professor Jeffrey Cooley has argued that, in many myths, Inanna's movements may correspond with the movements of the planet Venus in the sky. The discontinuous movements of Venus relate to both mythology as well as Inanna's dual nature. In Inanna's Descent to the Underworld, unlike any other deity, Inanna is able to descend into the netherworld and return to the heavens. The planet Venus appears to make a similar descent, setting in the West and then rising again in the East. An introductory hymn describes Inanna leaving the heavens and heading for Kur, what could be presumed to be, the mountains, replicating the rising and setting of Inanna to the West. In Inanna and Shukaletuda and Inanna's Descent into the Underworld appear to parallel the motion of the planet Venus. In Inanna and Shukaletuda, Shukaletuda is described as scanning the heavens in search of Inanna, possibly searching the eastern and western horizons. In the same myth, while searching for her attacker, Inanna herself makes several movements that correspond with the movements of Venus in the sky.

Via Mesopotamian influence, it is possible that the Ancient Egyptians and Greeks knew that the morning star and the evening star were one and the same as early as the second millennium BC—or the Late Period at the latest. The Egyptians knew the morning star as Tioumoutiri and the evening star as Ouaiti. They depicted Venus at first as a phoenix or heron (see Bennu), calling it 'the crosser' or 'star with crosses', associating it with Osiris, and later depicting it as two-headed (with human or falcon heads), and associated it with Horus, son of Isis (which during the even later Hellenistic period was together with Hathor identified with Aphrodite). The Greeks used the names Phōsphoros, meaning 'light-bringer' (whence the element phosphorus; alternately Ēōsphoros, meaning 'dawn-bringer'), for the morning star, and Hesperos, meaning 'Western one', for the evening star, both children of dawn Eos and therefore grandchildren of Aphrodite. Though by the Roman era they were recognized as one celestial object, known as "the star of Venus", the traditional two Greek names continued to be used, though usually translated to Latin as Lucifer and Vesper.

Classical poets such as Homer, Sappho, Ovid and Virgil spoke of the star and its light. Poets such as William Blake, Robert Frost, Letitia Elizabeth Landon, Alfred Lord Tennyson and William Wordsworth wrote odes to it. The composer Holst included it as the second movement of his The Planets suite.

"Venus, The Bringer of Peace" from Holst's The Planets

In India, the name for Venus in Sanskrit was Shukra Graha, meaning 'the planet Shukra'—in reference to Shukra, a powerful saint. As appears in Vedic astrology, the Sanskrit name Shukra means 'clear, pure' or 'brightness, clearness'. One of the nine Navagraha, it is held to affect wealth, pleasure and reproduction; it was the son of Bhrgu, preceptor of the Daityas, and guru of the Asuras.

The English name Venus stems originally from the ancient Romans. Romans named Venus after their goddess of love, who in turn was based on the ancient Greek love goddess Aphrodite, who was herself based on the similar Sumerian religion goddess Inanna (which is Ishtar in Akkadian religion), all of whom were associated with the planet. The weekday of the planet and these goddesses is Friday, named after the Germanic goddess Frigg, who has been associated with the Roman goddess Venus.

In Chinese, the planet is called metal star or gold star (金星; Jīnxīng); of the five elements of traditional Chinese philosophy, Venus was historically associated with metal. These traditions are shared among modern Chinese, Japanese, Korean and Vietnamese cultures, including a name for the planet literally meaning 'metal star' (金星) in each language.

The Maya considered Venus to be the most important celestial body after the Sun and Moon. They called it Chac ek, or Noh Ek', 'the Great Star'. The cycles of Venus were important to their calendar and were described in some of their books, such as the Maya Codex of Mexico and Dresden Codex. The flag of Chile (Estrella Solitaria, 'Lone Star') depicts Venus.

=== Modern culture ===
Venus is portrayed just to the right of the large cypress tree in Vincent van Gogh's 1889 painting The Starry Night.

The impenetrable Venusian cloud cover gave science fiction writers free rein to speculate on conditions at its surface; all the more so when early observations showed that not only was it similar in size to Earth, it possessed a substantial atmosphere. Closer to the Sun than Earth, the planet was often depicted as warmer, but still habitable by humans. The genre reached its peak between the 1930s and 1950s, at a time when science had revealed some aspects of Venus, but not yet the harsh reality of its surface conditions. Findings from the first missions to Venus showed reality to be quite different and brought this particular genre to an end. As scientific knowledge of Venus advanced, science fiction authors tried to keep pace, particularly by conjecturing human attempts to terraform Venus.

Carl Sagan remarked in the "Heaven and Hell" episode of the 1980 television series Cosmos: A Personal Voyage, "Far from the balmy paradise imagined by some early scientists, Venus is the one place in the solar system most like Hell." (Note: Sagan's comment occurs at 42:43.)

=== Symbols ===

The symbol of a circle with a small cross beneath is the so-called Venus symbol, gaining its name for being used as the astronomical symbol for Venus. The symbol is of ancient Greek origin, and represents more generally femininity, adopted by biology as gender symbol for female, like the Mars symbol for male and sometimes the Mercury symbol for hermaphrodite. This gendered association of Venus and Mars has been used to pair them heteronormatively, describing women and men stereotypically as being so different that they can be understood as coming from different planets, an understanding popularized in 1992 by the book titled Men Are from Mars, Women Are from Venus.

The Venus symbol was also used in Western alchemy representing the element copper (like the symbol of Mercury is also the symbol of the element mercury), and since polished copper has been used for mirrors from antiquity the symbol for Venus has sometimes been called Venus mirror, representing the mirror of the goddess, although this origin has been discredited as an unlikely origin.

Besides the Venus symbol, many other symbols have been associated with Venus, other common ones are the crescent or particularly the star, as with the Star of Ishtar.

== See also ==
- Outline of Venus
- Physical properties of planets in the Solar System
- Venus-like exoplanet
- Venus zone
