= Henry Walcott Farnam =

American economist

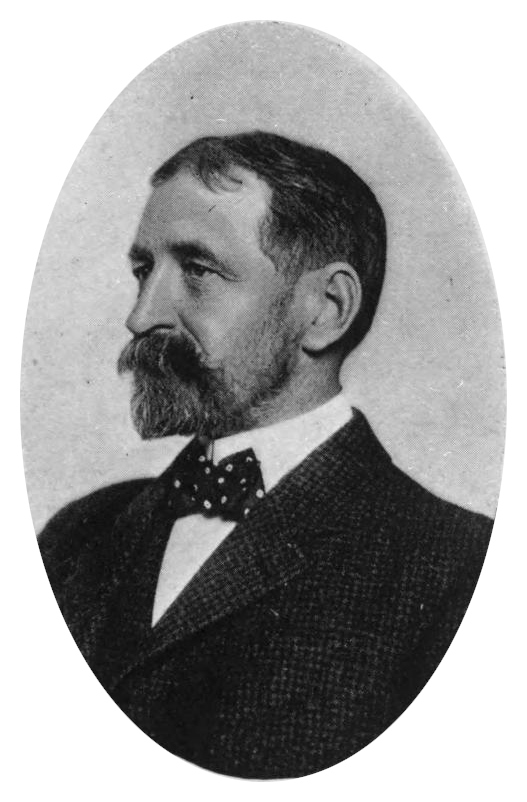

Henry Walcott Farnam (November 6, 1853 in New Haven, Connecticut – September 5, 1933) was an American economist.

== Background ==
The son of Henry Farman, a railroad executive, Walcott Farman attended Yale University, graduating with a bachelor's degree in 1874, and then studied towards an M.A. in Roman law and economics in 1876. Like many American economists of the late 19th century, Farnam then went to Germany to study under the leading figures of the German historical school. Farnam earned a PhD from the University of Strasbourg in 1878.

== Career ==
Farnam was professor of political economy at Yale University from 1880 to 1918. He served as the editor of The Yale Review from 1892 to 1911. In 1911, he served as president of the American Economic Association.

In 1906, Farnam made a gift of US$30,000 to be used for the erection of a new building for Lowell House. The gift was the largest of its kind on record and would allow the settlement work to be conducted on a broader and more effective basis. Farnam was one of five Yale professors who, together with several women of New Haven, Connecticut, composed the Council of the organization.

That same year, Farnam co-founded the American Association for Labor Legislation (AALL) with other economists.
