= Lowell House (New Haven, Connecticut) =

Social settlement in Connecticut, US

Coordinates: 41.3099°N 72.9122°W

Lowell House was an American social settlement, the first in New Haven, Connecticut. Established in 1900, it formed an association in 1903.

== History ==
Established January, 1900, as an outgrowth of a flower mission operated by the youth of the Second Congregational Church, Fair Haven, and the personal incentive of Dr. Julia E. Teele, who established herself in a tenement occupied by five other families, "to study the needs, live a life of neighborliness, and to interest others in our neighbors." In February, 1901, an advisory council was organized which assumed the financial burden of the work, and the house at 153 Franklin Street was taken. In March, 1903, an association was formed and a constitution adopted. The settlement was maintained by voluntary subscriptions.

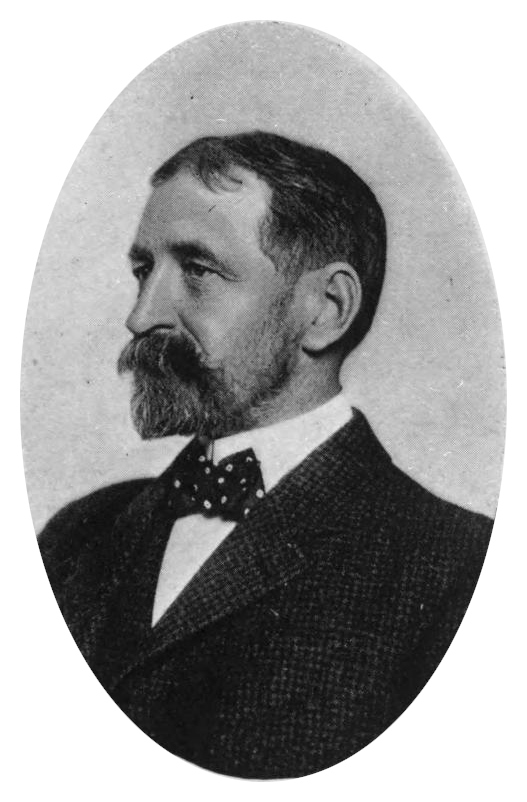
Henry Walcott Farnam

In 1906, announcement was made of a gift of US$30,000 by Professor Henry Walcott Farnam to be used for the erection of a new building for the Lowell House. The gift was the largest of its kind on record and would allow the settlement work to be conducted on a broader and more effective basis. Farnam was interested in the work of Lowell House, and was one of five Yale University professors who, together with several women of New Haven, composed the Council of the organization.

== Neighborhood ==
The settlement was located at 202 Franklin Street (January 1900 to January 1901), 153 Franklin Street (1901 to May 15, 1907), and Dr. Teele's apartment, Hamilton Streel (1906-). From 1907, it was located at 198 Hamilton Street, with a dispensary at 206 Hamilton Street.

The settlement was located in a factory district. While there were a considerable number of Irish families left, they were fast being pushed out and the district was becoming characteristically Italian. There were some Jews, Russians and Germans.

== Activities ==
Lowell House was involved in several activities, such as representation in the various city movements for better conditions. It was involved in an investigation of housing, as a result of which a committee was formed which drafted the Connecticut Tenement House Act, which passed in 1905. The movement which led to the presentation to the Connecticut legislature of a bill for the regulation of tenement houses had its origin in two independent organizations, one in Hartford, Connecticut, the other in New Haven. In New Haven, the Lowell House Association took up the matter in the winter of 1901-02, and by enlisting the volunteer work of students and others and securing the cooperation of the city authorities, made a thorough and careful investigation of nine city blocks in one of the worst quarters of the city. This led to the formation of a volunteer committee which contained representatives of the business interests of New Haven as well as city officials, sanitary experts, and charitable workers, and this committee drafted a bill which was presented by Senator Eli Whitney of New Haven.

Residents were also able to be of service in organizing the District Nurses Association, the Consumers' League, and the Associated Civic Societies.

Lowell House maintained a noon lunch club for factory girls, a dispensary, a bank, and a branch of the public library. In the Lowell House library, all the readers were children, except for the few foreign language books read by adults.

Piano lessons and practice were available, as well as classes in sewing, drawing, cooking, carving, kitchen gardening, painting, iron work, dressmaking, and basketry. There were various clubs for children and women, boys and young men; English classes for foreigners. Summer work included a playground open for eight weeks, piano lessons, a woman's club, dispensary, noon lunch, and some informal work.

The Lowell House had a wide influence in the promotion of good citizenship among the working classes.

In 1900, Delia Lyman Porter organized the Mothers' Club of Lowell House, and served as president for more than two decades. In 1926, representing the club and its opposition to the amending of the National Prohibition Act, Porter spoke before Congress:—

I am president of the New Haven Women's Church Union of 60 churches; president of the New Haven Lowell House Mothers' Club for 25 years; chairman of religious training for Connecticut Congress of Mothers, representing 8,000. I am also a delegate appointed at a meeting of 500 women of New Haven, Conn., members of 60 Protestant churches of 8 denominations, also Catholic and Hebrew, as well as more than 50 organizations of women, who respectfully request the Senate of the United States to pass no act which will weaken the Volstead Act or the eighteenth amendment. As president for more than 25 years of a mothers' club, I know the misery of families where the husband and father was too weak to resist the saloon on pay day. None of the bills or acts now before you provide for any abolishment of the saloon. This club unanimously protests.

== Residents ==
As of 1911, there were four women residents and three men. There were also 40 women volunteers and ten men. Head Residents included: Dr. Julia E. Teele (January 1900 to Spring 1905), Ethel R. Evans (October 1905-).

== See also ==
- Settlement and community houses in the United States
