= Transit of Venus (disambiguation) =

A Transit of Venus occurs when the planet Venus passes between the Sun and the Earth, as it happened in:

- Transit of Venus, 1639
- Transit of Venus, 1761
- Transit of Venus, 1769
- Transit of Venus, 1874
- Transit of Venus, 1882
- Transit of Venus, 2004
- Transit of Venus, 2012

Transit of Venus may also refer to:

- Passage de Vénus, a series of photographs of the 1874 transit, sometimes considered the first "film" ever made
- Transit of Venus March, an 1883 march by John Philip Sousa
- Transit of Venus (play), a 1992 play by Maureen Hunter
- Transit of Venus (opera), a 2007 operatic adaptation of the 1992 play
- The Transit of Venus (Doctor Who audio), a 2009 audiobook based on the television series Doctor Who
- Transit of Venus (album), the 2012 album from Canadian rock band Three Days Grace
- The Transit of Venus, a 1980 novel by Shirley Hazzard
- Transit of Venus: Travels in the Pacific, a 1992 book by Julian Evans

== See also ==
- Astrological transit
