= 1874 transit of Venus =

Astronomical event

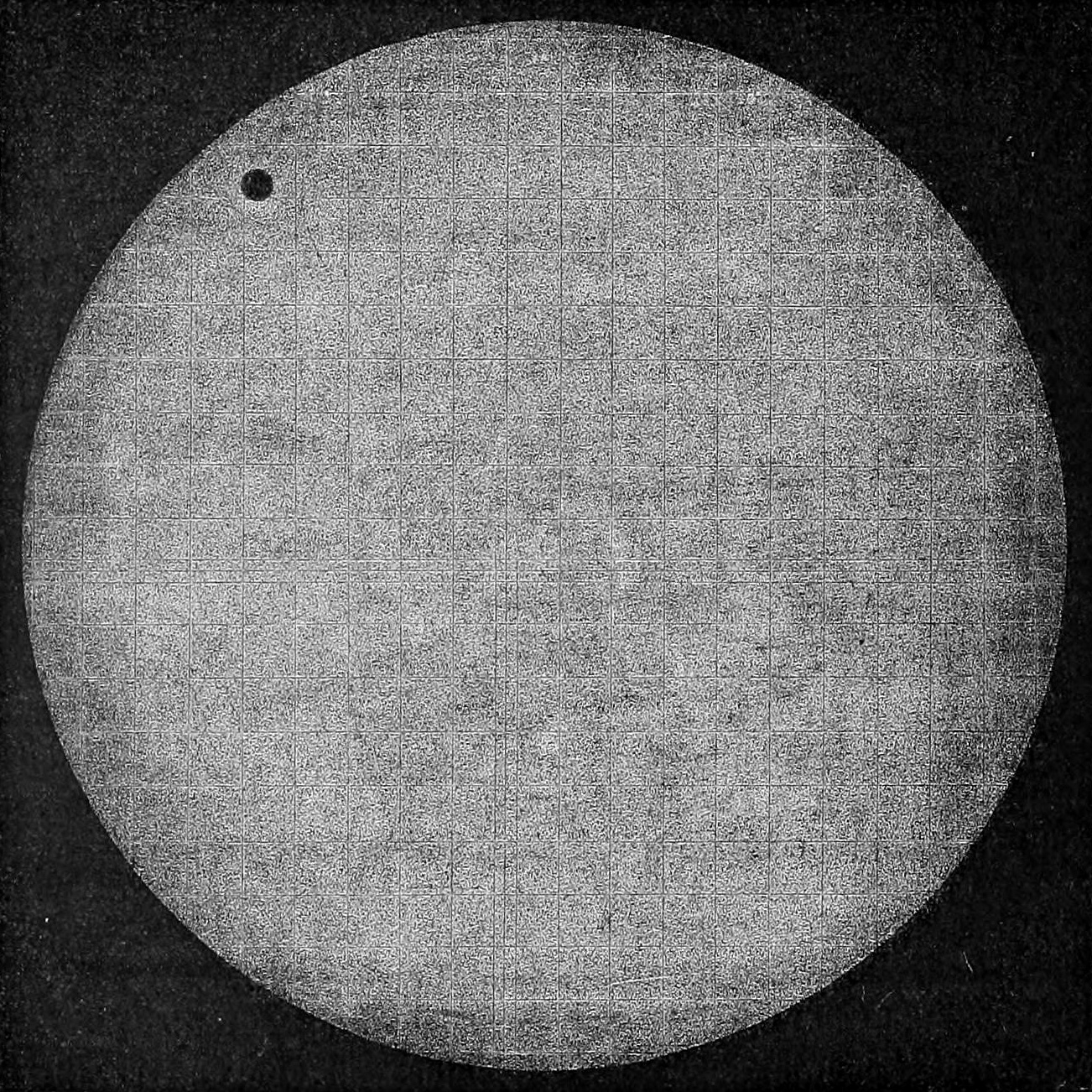
The transit as seen from Japan by Pierre Janssen

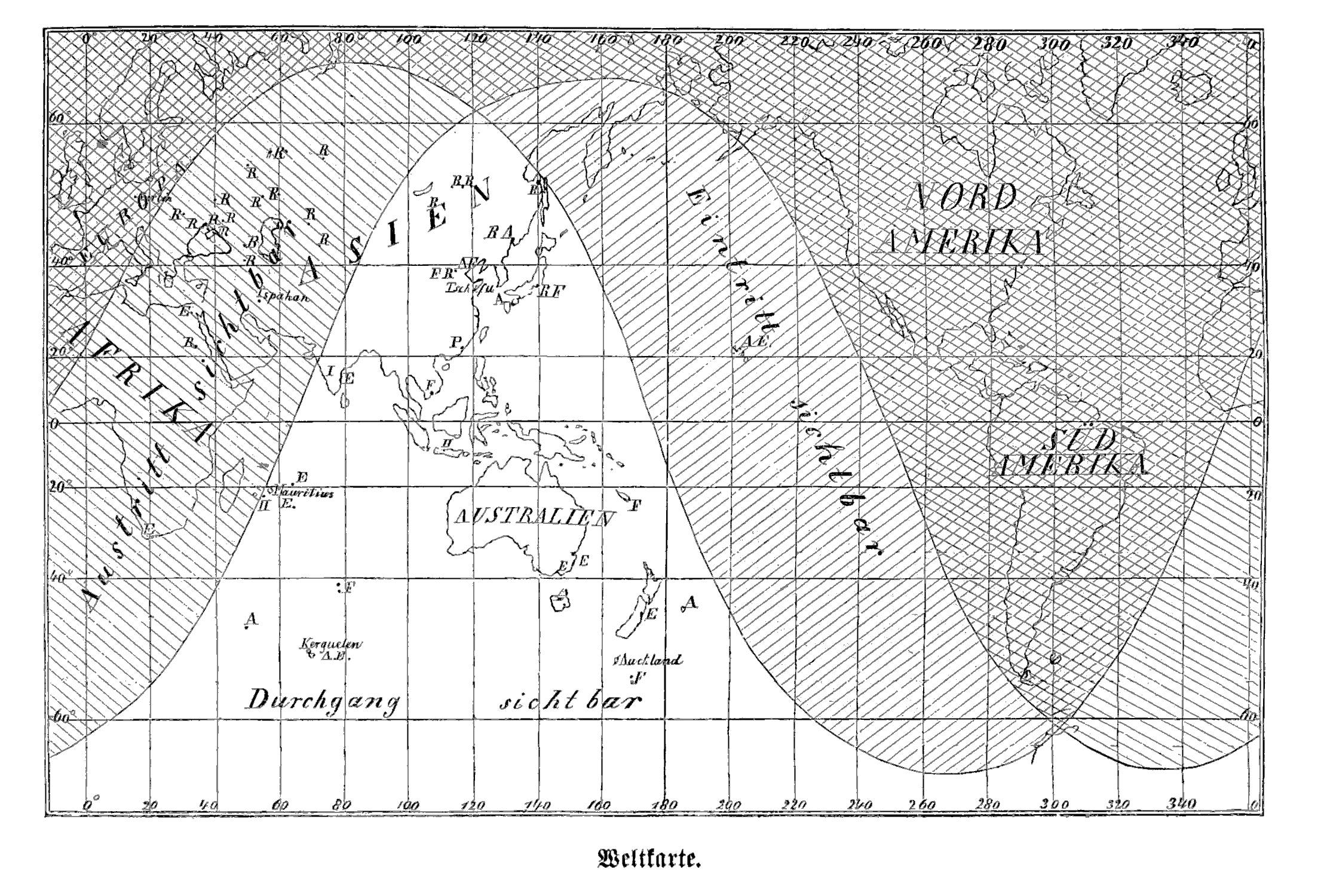
Map showing the visibility of the 1874 transit of Venus

The 1874 transit of Venus, which took place on 9 December 1874 (01:49 to 06:26 UTC), (Note: The timings given here are the geocentric circumstances, as viewed from the centre of the Earth. The exact timings of a transit vary by a few minutes from these timings depending on the exact location it is viewed from on the surface of the Earth. It is these variations, due to parallax, that allow measurements of the timings to be used to calculate a value for the astronomical unit.) was the first of the pair of transits of Venus that took place in the 19th century, with the second transit occurring eight years later in 1882. The previous pair of transits had taken place in 1761 and 1769, and the next pair would not take place until 2004 and 2012. (Note: For details of one of the observations carried out in 1769, see 1769 Transit of Venus observed from Tahiti. For details of the 2004 and 2012 transits, see Transit of Venus, 2004 and Transit of Venus, 2012.) As with previous transits, the 1874 transit would provide an opportunity for improved measurements and observations. Numerous expeditions were planned and sent out to observe the transit from locations around the globe, with several countries setting up official committees to organise the planning.

== Expeditions ==
=== French expeditions ===
There were six official French expeditions. One expedition went to New Zealand's Campbell Island, the other five travelling to Île Saint-Paul in the Indian Ocean, Nouméa in New Caledonia in the Pacific, Nagasaki in Japan (with an auxiliary station in Kobe), Peking in China, and Saigon in Vietnam.

=== British expeditions ===
There were five official British expeditions or observation sites. One expedition travelled to Hawaii, with two others sent to the Kerguelen Archipelago in the far southern reaches of the Indian Ocean, and Rodrigues, an island further north in the Indian Ocean, near Mauritius. A fourth expedition went to a site near Cairo in Egypt, and the fifth travelled to a site near Christchurch (now Burnham Military Camp) in New Zealand. Several of the expeditions included auxiliary observation stations that were constructed in addition to the main observation sites.

=== American expeditions ===
In the United States, the Transit of Venus Commission sent out eight expeditions funded by Congress, one to Kerguelen, one to Hobart, Tasmania, one to Queenstown, New Zealand, one led by Edwin Smith to Chatham Island in the southern Pacific, one led by James Craig Watson in Peking, one to Nagasaki in Japan, and one to Vladivostok in Russia. The eighth expedition had been intended for Crozet Island, but was unable to land there and instead made observations from Tasmania. These expeditions obtained 350 photographic plates for the 1874 transit.

== Observations ==
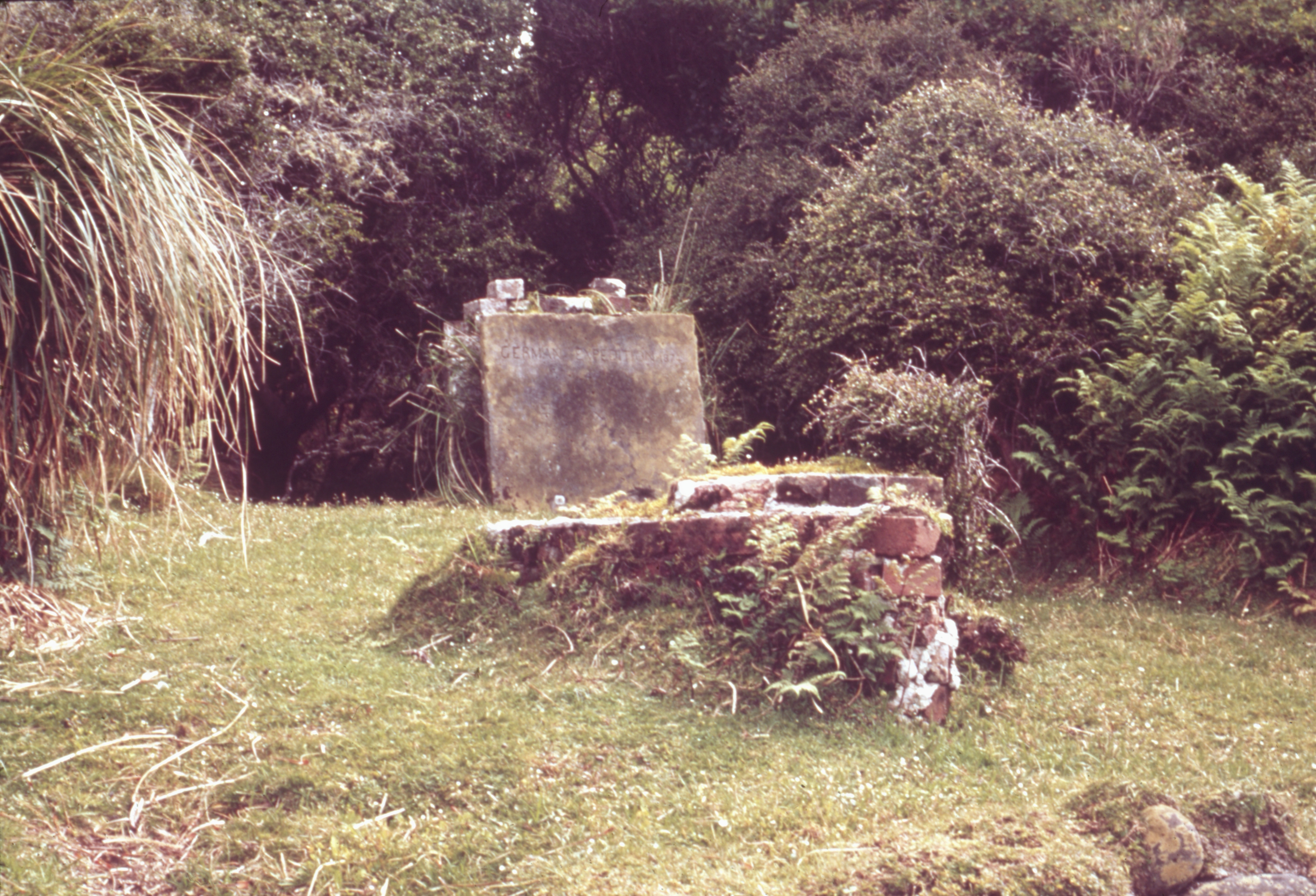
German Transit of Venus observation site 1874, Auckland Islands

The transit was observed from many observatories, including the Melbourne Observatory, Adelaide Observatory and Sydney Observatory in Australia, the Royal Observatory at Cape Town in what is now South Africa, the Royal Alfred Observatory on Mauritius, the Madras Observatory in Madras, India, the Colonial Time Service Observatory in Wellington, New Zealand, and the Khedivial Observatory in Egypt. The Sydney Observatory sent an observing party to Goulburn in Australia.

Passage de Venus (1874) by Pierre Janssen

Italian astronomer Pietro Tacchini led an expedition to Muddapur, India. Other locations in India from where the transit was observed included Roorkee, and Visakhapatnam. The German astronomer Hugo von Seeliger directed an expedition that travelled to the Auckland Islands (subantarctic New Zealand islands). German astronomers also travelled to Isfahan in Persia, and to Kerguelen. The Dutch astronomer Jean Abraham Chrétien Oudemans made observations from Réunion, and observations were also made from various points in the Dutch East Indies. Austrian astronomers made observations from Jassy, in what is now Romania. The Russian astronomer Otto Wilhelm von Struve organised expeditions to make observations in eastern Asia, the Caucasus, Persia and Egypt. Two Mexican expeditions travelled to Yokohama in Japan.

There were also several individuals that journeyed to various locations to observe the transit, or funded private expeditions. Archibald Campbell made observations from Thebes in Egypt. James Ludovic Lindsay funded a private expedition to Mauritius. Several private or amateur observations were known to have been made from New South Wales, including from Eden, Windsor, and Sydney. A privately funded expedition from the United States also travelled to Beechworth, Victoria, in Australia.

Not all the observers were able to make measurements, either due to adverse weather conditions, or problems with the equipment used. Many observers, particularly those on the official expeditions, used the new technique of photoheliography, intending to use the photographic plates to make precise measurements. However, the results of using this new technique were poor, and several expeditions were unable to produce publishable results or improve on existing values for the astronomical unit (au). In addition to this, observations made of Mars were producing more accurate results for calculating the value of the au than could be obtained during a transit of Venus.

== See also ==
- Passage de Venus – A series of photographs taken of the transit by Pierre Janssen, listed by IMDb as the first film
