= 2004 transit of Venus =

Astronomical event on 8 June 2004

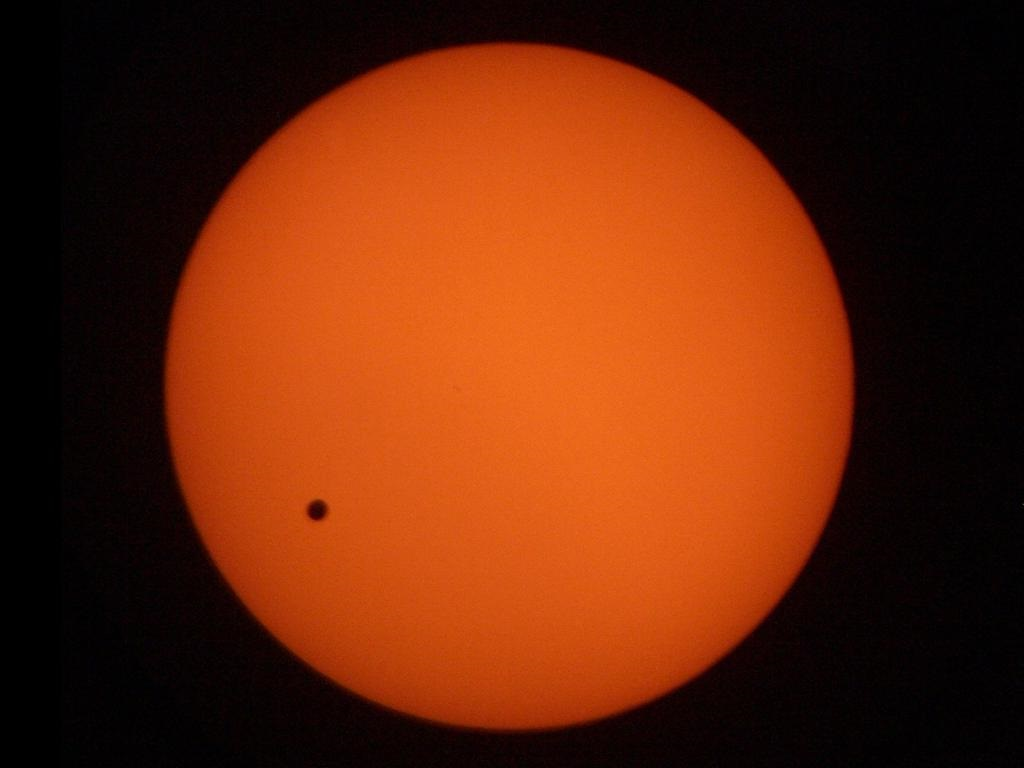
A photograph taken at 15:39 Hong Kong time (07:39 UTC) from Tuen Mun, New Territories, Hong Kong.

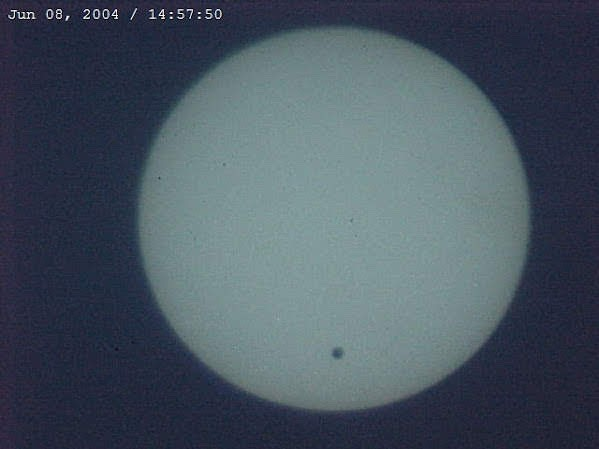
A projection of the 2004 Transit of Venus as seen from Mumbai, India at 14:57:50 IST (09:27:50 UTC) clicked using a Sony Digital Mavica MVC-FD73 camera by Dhaval Mahidharia.

A transit of Venus was observed from Earth on 8 June 2004. The event received significant attention, since it was the first Venus transit after the invention of broadcast media. No human alive at the time had witnessed a previous Venus transit since that transit occurred on 6 December 1882 in the 19th century.

The European Southern Observatory (ESO) and the European Association for Astronomy Education (EAAE) launched the VT-2004 project, together with the Institut de Mécanique Céleste et de Calcul des Éphémérides (IMCCE) and the Observatoire de Paris in France, as well as the Astronomical Institute of the Academy of Sciences of the Czech Republic. This project had 2,763 participants all over the world, including nearly 1,000 school classes. The participants made a measurement of the astronomical unit (AU) of 149 608 708 km ± 11 835 km which had only a 0.007% difference to the accepted value.

== Visibility ==
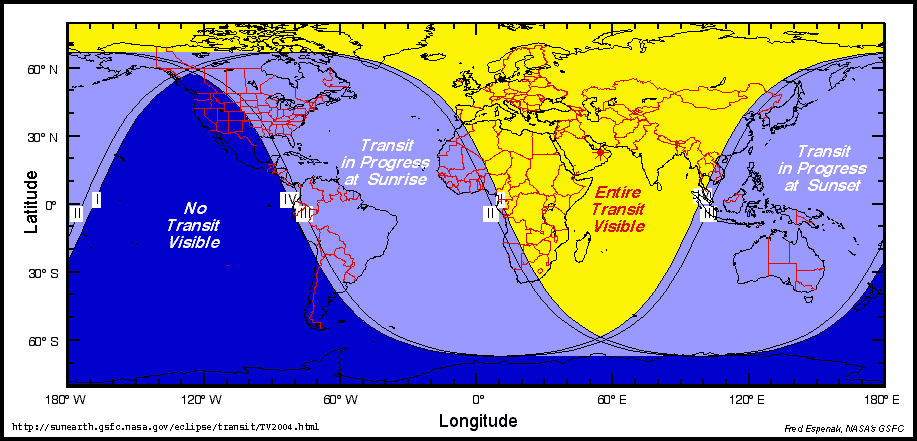
Where the 2004 transit was visible

The entire transit was visible from Europe, most of Asia, and almost all of Africa. The beginning was visible before sunset from easternmost Asia and Australia. The end was visible after sunrise from the westernmost fringe of Africa, eastern North America, and much of South America. The transit was not visible at all from western North America, southern South America, Hawaii, or New Zealand. The regions from which the transit were visible are shown on the map to the right.

== Timing ==
The following table and image give times for various events (respectively, first contact, second contact, the midpoint, third contact and fourth contact) during the transit on 8 June 2004 for a hypothetical observer at the center of the Earth. Due to parallax, times observed at different points on Earth may differ from the following by as much as ±7 minutes.

Times (UTC) for observations of the transit on 8 June 2004
I	II	Mid	III	IV
05:13:29	05:32:55	08:19:44	11:06:33	11:25:59
The path of Venus across the Sun (moving left to right)

== Media ==
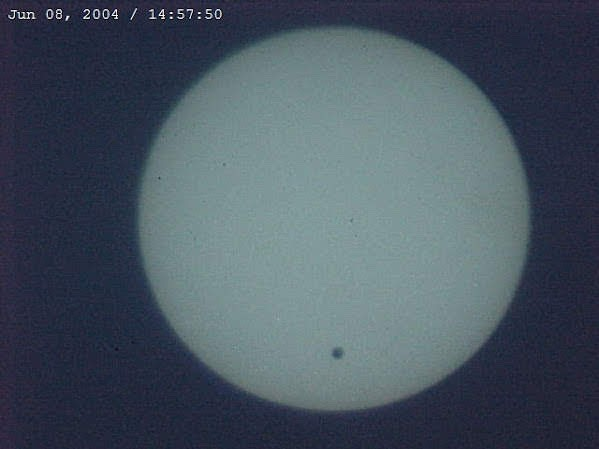
A projection of the 2004 Transit of Venus as seen from Mumbai, India at 14:57:50 IST (09:27:50 UTC) clicked using a Sony Digital Mavica MVC-FD73 camera by Dhaval Mahidharia.

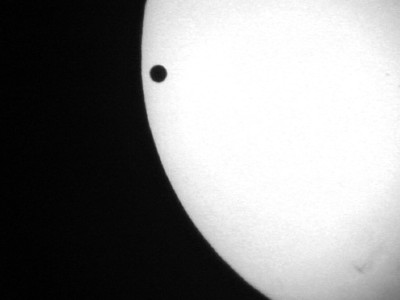
Source: Daniel P. B. Smith

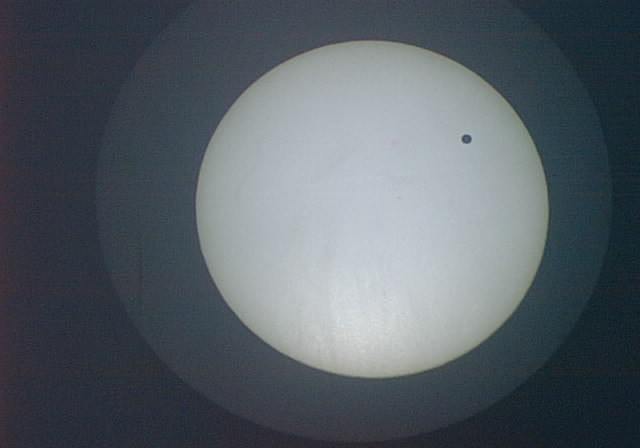
2004 transit as seen from Bangalore at 07:41 UTC, about two hours into the transit. The image is inverted compared to the diagram above, so Venus is seen near the top of the Sun's disc

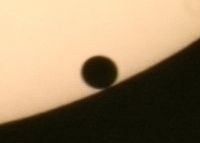
Third contact (compare to III in the diagram above) of the 2004 Venus transit as seen from the central part of the United States

Animation depicting the transit of Venus from the perspective of Earth

Close-up video of the 2004 Venus transit, recorded in the ultraviolet part of the spectrum

== See also ==
- Transit of Venus
- Transit of Venus, 2012
