= Transit of Venus =

Astronomical transit of Venus across the Sun

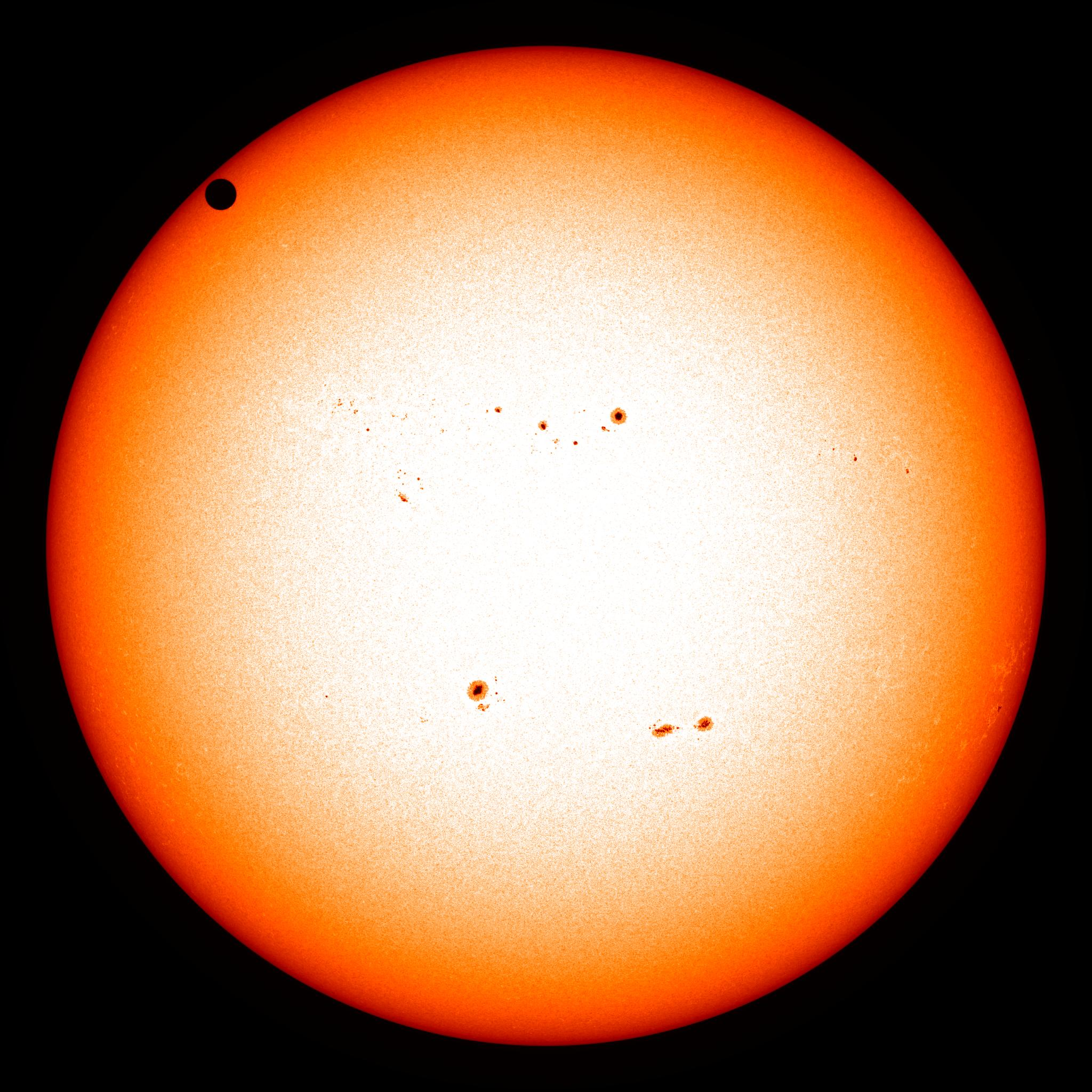
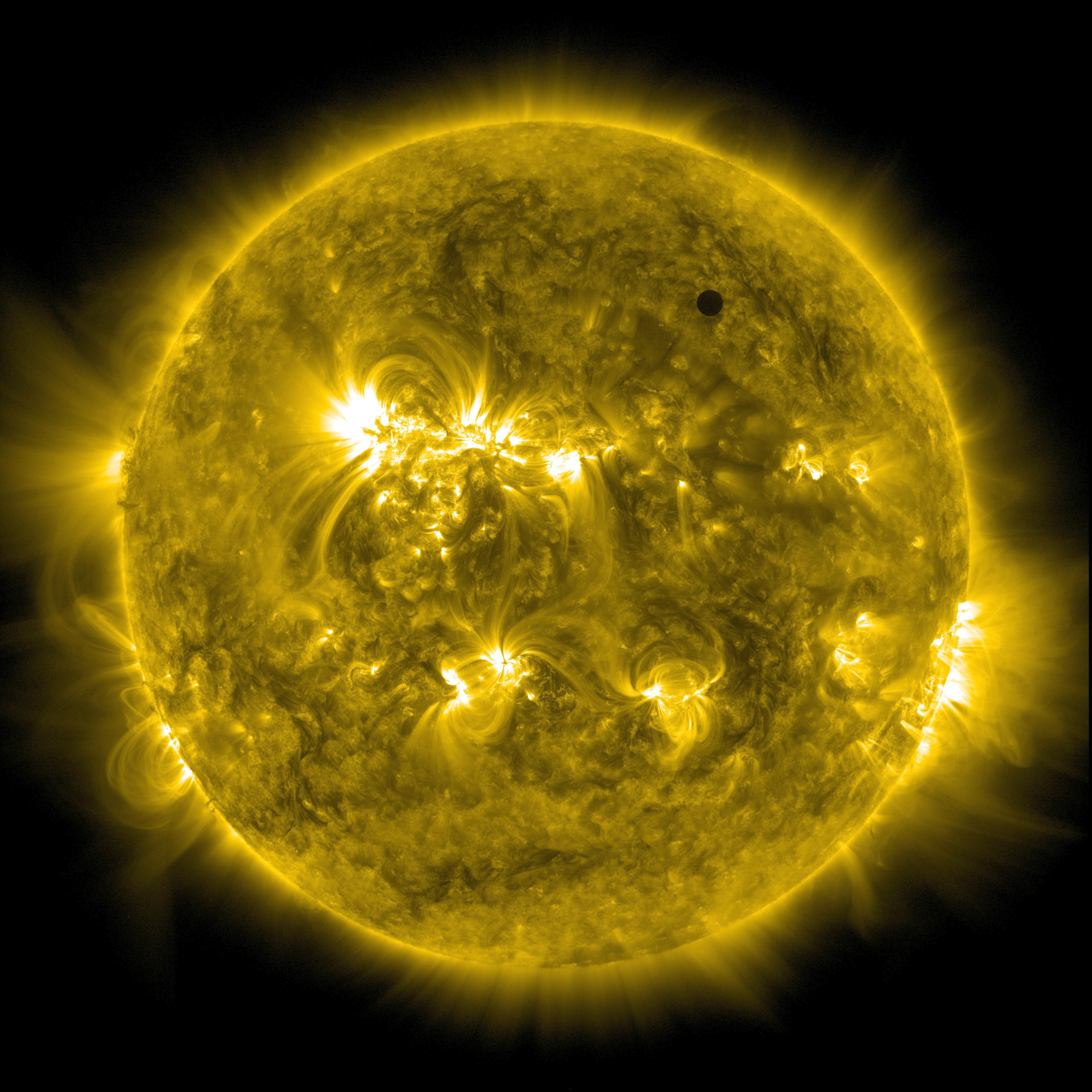
Images of the transit of Venus, taken from NASA's Solar Dynamics Observatory in 2012: (left) visible light; (right) ultraviolet

A transit of Venus takes place when Venus passes directly between the Sun and the Earth (or any other superior planet), becoming visible against (and hence obscuring a small portion of) the solar disk. During a transit, Venus is visible as a small black circle moving across the face of the Sun.

Transits of Venus reoccur periodically. A pair of transits takes place eight years apart in December (Gregorian calendar) followed by a gap of 121.5 years, before another pair occurs eight years apart in June, followed by another gap, of 105.5 years. The dates advance by about two days per 243-year cycle. The periodicity is a reflection of the fact that the orbital periods of Earth and Venus are close to 8:13 and 243:395 commensurabilities. The last pairs of transits occurred on 8 June 2004 and 5–6 June 2012. The next pair of transits will occur on 10–11 December 2117 and 8 December 2125. A transit lasts approximately 6 hours.

Transits of Venus provided the first opportunities to accurately calculate the distance from Earth to Venus, by which the astronomical unit and the distances of the other Solar System bodies could then be determined. The 2012 transit refined techniques for the search for exoplanets.

== Conjunctions ==
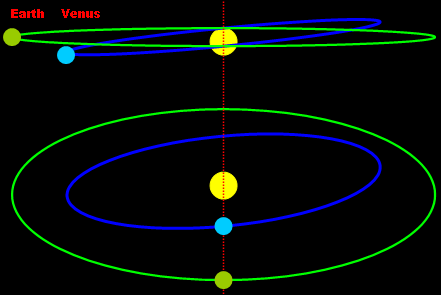
Diagram of transits of Venus and the angle between the orbital planes of Venus and Earth

The orbit of Venus has an inclination of 3.39° relative to that of the Earth, and so passes under (or over) the Sun when viewed from the Earth. A transit occurs when Venus reaches conjunction with the Sun whilst also passing through the Earth's orbital plane, and so it passes directly across the face of the Sun. (Note: Although the inclination between these two orbital planes is only 3.4°, Venus can be as far as 9.6° from the Sun when viewed from the Earth at inferior conjunction.) Sequences of transits usually repeat every 243 years, after which Venus and Earth have returned to nearly the same point in their respective orbits. During the Earth's 243 sidereal orbital periods, which total 88,757.3 days, Venus completes 395 sidereal orbital periods of 224.701 days each, which is equal to 88,756.9 Earth days. This period of time corresponds to 152 synodic periods of Venus.

A pair of transits takes place eight years apart in December, followed by a gap of 121.5 years, before another pair occurs eight years apart in June, followed by another gap, of 105.5 years. Other patterns are possible within the 243-year cycle, because of the slight mismatch between the times when the Earth and Venus arrive at the point of conjunction. Prior to 1518, the pattern of transits was 8, 113.5, and 121.5 years, and the eight inter-transit gaps before the AD 546 transit were 121.5 years apart. The current pattern will continue until 2846, when it will be replaced by a pattern of 105.5, 129.5, and 8 years. Thus, the 243-year cycle is relatively stable, but the number of transits and their timing within the cycle vary over time. Since the 243:395 Earth:Venus commensurability is only approximate, there are different sequences of transits occurring 243 years apart, each extending for several thousand years, which are eventually replaced by other sequences. For instance, there is a series which ended in 541 BC, and the series which includes 2117 only started in AD 1631.

== History of observation of the transits ==
Ancient Indian, Greek, Egyptian, Babylonian, and Chinese observers knew of Venus and recorded the planet's motions. Pythagoras is credited with realizing that the so-called morning and evening stars were really both the planet Venus. There is no evidence that any of these cultures observed planetary transits. It has been proposed that frescoes found at the Maya site at Mayapan may contain a pictorial representation of the 12th or 13th century transits.

The Persian polymath Avicenna claimed to have observed Venus as a spot on the Sun. There was a transit on 24 May 1032, but Avicenna did not give the date of his observation, and modern scholars have questioned whether he could have observed the transit from his location; he may have mistaken a sunspot for Venus. He used his alleged transit observation to help establish that Venus was, at least sometimes, below the Sun in Ptolemaic cosmology, i.e., the sphere of Venus comes before the sphere of the Sun when moving out from the Earth in the then prevailing geocentric model.

Transits of Venus (1631–2012)
Date(s) of transits	Time (UTC)			Notes
Date(s) of transits	Start	Mid	End	Notes
7 December 1631	03:51	05:19	06:47	Predicted by Kepler
4 December 1639	14:57	18:25	21:54	First transit to be recorded, by Horrocks and Crabtree
6 June 1761	02:02	05:19	08:37	Lomonosov, Chappe d'Auteroche, and others observe from Russia; Mason and Dixon observe from the Cape of Good Hope. John Winthrop observes from St. John's, Newfoundland
3–4 June 1769	19:15	22:25	01:35	Cook sent to Tahiti to observe the transit, Chappe to San José del Cabo, Baja California, and Maximilian Hell to Vardø, Norway.
9 December 1874	01:49	04:07	06:26	Pietro Tacchini leads expedition to Muddapur, India. A French expedition goes to New Zealand's Campbell Island, and a British expedition travels to Hawaii. This is also the first ever transit filmed.
6 December 1882	13:57	17:06	20:15	
8 June 2004	05:13	08:20	11:26	Various media networks globally broadcast live video of the Venus transit.
5–6 June 2012	22:09	01:29	04:49	Visible in its entirety from the Pacific and Eastern Asia, with the beginning of the transit visible from North America and the end visible from Europe. First transit while a spacecraft orbits Venus.

=== 1631 and 1639 transits ===
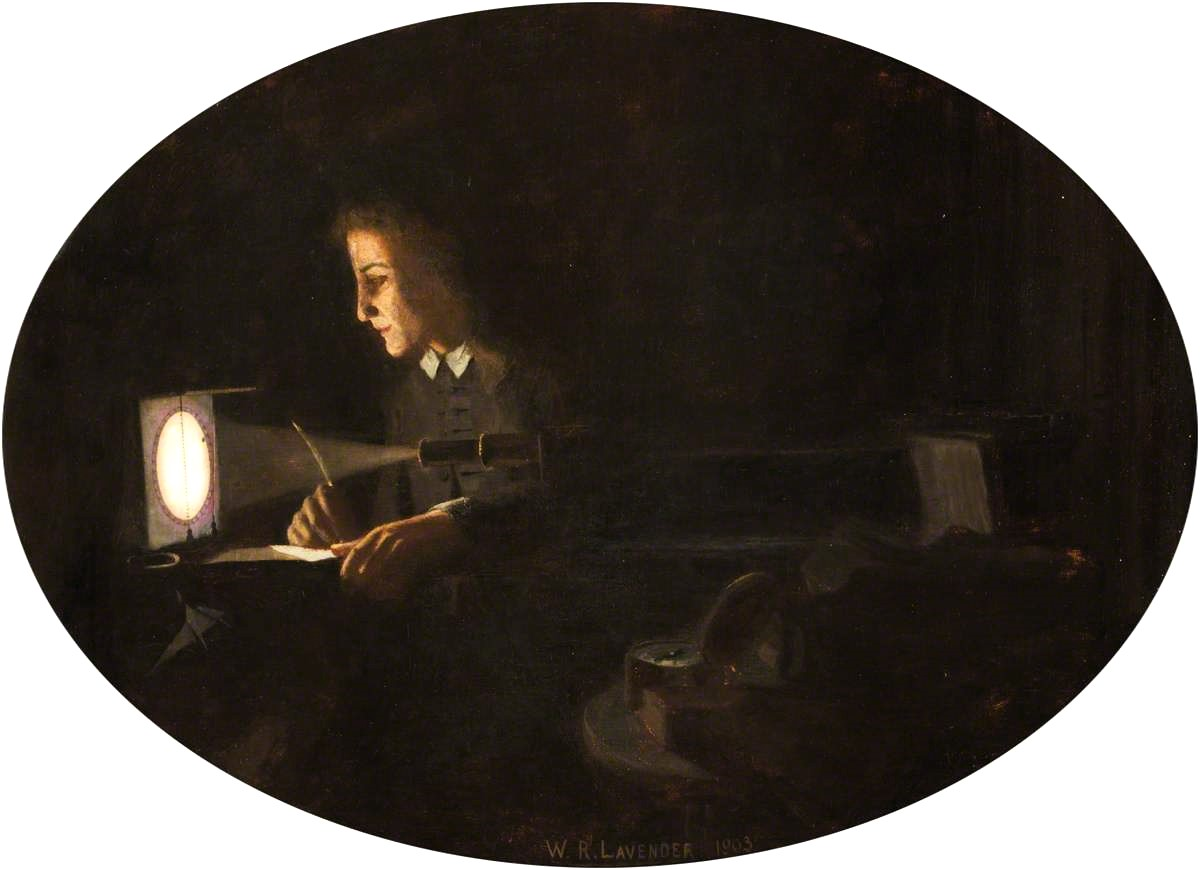
William Richard Lavender, Jeremiah Horrocks (1618–1641) (1903), Astley Hall Museum and Art Gallery

The German astronomer Johannes Kepler predicted the 1631 transit in 1627, but his methods were not sufficiently accurate to predict that it could not be seen throughout most of Europe. As a consequence, astronomers were unable to use his prediction to observe the event.

The first recorded observation of a transit of Venus was made by the English astronomer Jeremiah Horrocks from his home at Carr House in Much Hoole, near Preston, on 4 December 1639 (24 November O.S.). His friend William Crabtree observed the transit from nearby Broughton. Kepler had predicted transits in 1631 and 1761 and a near miss in 1639. Horrocks corrected Kepler's calculation for the orbit of Venus, realized that transits of Venus would occur in pairs 8 years apart, and so predicted the transit of 1639. Although he was uncertain of the exact time, he calculated that the transit was to begin at approximately 15:00. Horrocks focused the image of the Sun through a simple telescope and onto paper, where he could observe the Sun without damaging his eyesight. After waiting for most of the day, he eventually saw the transit when clouds obscuring the Sun cleared at about 15:15, half an hour before sunset. His observations allowed him to make a well-informed guess for the diameter of Venus and an estimate of the mean distance between the Earth and the Sun (59.4 million mi (95.6 million km; 0.639 AU)). His observations were not published until 1661, well after Horrocks's death. (Note: His estimation for the distance from Earth to the Sun was about two thirds of the actual distance of 93 million mi (150 million km), but was a more accurate figure than any suggested up to that time.) Horrocks based his calculation on the (false) presumption that each planet's size was proportional to its rank from the Sun, not on the parallax effect as used by the 1761 and 1769 and following experiments.

=== 1761 transit ===
Measuring Venus transit times to determine solar parallax

In 1663, the Scottish mathematician James Gregory had suggested in his Optica Promota that observations of a transit of Mercury, at widely spaced points on the surface of the Earth, could be used to calculate the solar parallax, and hence the astronomical unit by means of triangulation. Aware of this, the English astronomer Edmond Halley made observations of such a transit on 28 October O.S. 1677 from the island of Saint Helena, but was disappointed to find that only Richard Towneley in the Lancashire town of Burnley, Lancashire had made another accurate observation of the event, whilst Gallet, at Avignon, had simply recorded that it had occurred. Halley was not satisfied that the resulting calculation of the solar parallax of 45" was accurate.

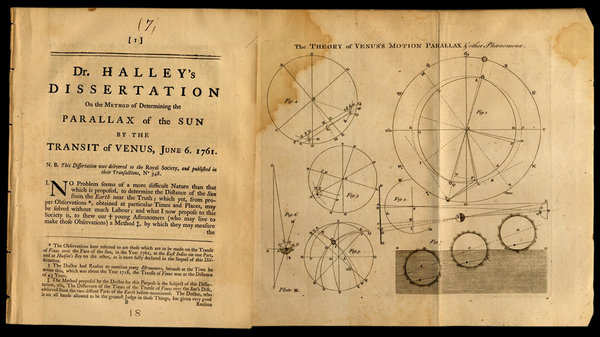
Halley 1716 proposal of determining the parallax of the sun

In a paper published in 1691, and a more refined one in 1716, Halley proposed that more accurate calculations could be made using measurements of a transit of Venus, although the next such event was not due until 1761 (6 June N.S., 26 May O.S.). In an attempt to observe the first transit of the pair, astronomers from Britain (John Winthrop) and France (Jean-Baptiste Chappe d'Auteroche, Alexandre-Gui Pingré, and Guillaume Le Gentil) took part in expeditions to places that included Newfoundland, Siberia, and Madagascar. Most of them observed at least part of the transit. Jeremiah Dixon and Charles Mason succeeded in observing the transit at the Cape of Good Hope, but Nevil Maskelyne and Robert Waddington were less successful on Saint Helena, although they put their voyage to good use by trialling the lunar-distance method of finding longitude.

Venus was generally thought to possess an atmosphere prior to the transit of 1761, but the possibility that it could be detected during a transit seems not to have been considered. The planet's atmosphere was discovered by the Russian polymath Mikhail Lomonosov, who observed the 1761 transit from the Imperial Academy of Sciences of St. Petersburg and inferred the existence of an atmosphere from a luminous arc he observed around the black disc of Venus during ingress and egress. Doubts about the feasibility of such an observation with 18th-century telescopes were convincingly resolved by the 2012 transit of Venus experiment that successfully replicated the observation using several antique refractors, confirming Lomonosov's account.

=== 1769 transit ===
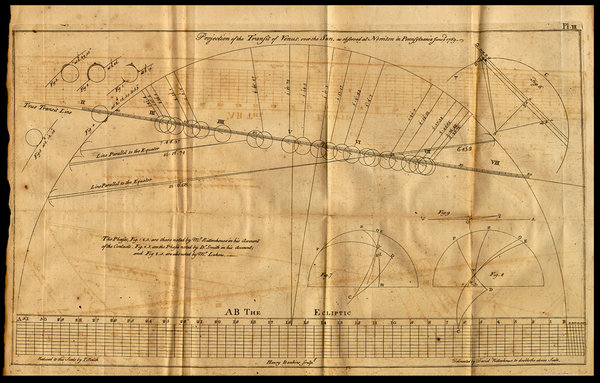
Diagram from David Rittenhouse's observations of the 1769 transit of Venus

For the 1769 transit, scientists travelled to places all over the world. The Czech astronomer Christian Mayer was invited by the Russian empress Catherine the Great to observe the transit in Saint Petersburg with Anders Johan Lexell, while other members of the Russian Academy of Sciences went to eight other locations in the Russian Empire under the general coordination of Stepan Rumovsky. King George III of the United Kingdom had the King's Observatory built near his summer residence at Richmond Lodge, so that he and the Astronomer Royal, Stephen Demainbray, could observe the transit. Maximilian Hell and his assistant János Sajnovics travelled to Vardø, Norway. Wales and Joseph Dymond went to Hudson Bay to observe the event. In Philadelphia, the American Philosophical Society erected three temporary observatories and appointed a committee led by David Rittenhouse. Observations were made by a group led by Dr. Benjamin West in Providence, Rhode Island, Observations were also made from Tahiti by Captain James Cook and Charles Green at a location still known as Point Venus. (Note: The observations of the transit on Tahiti occurred during the first voyage of James Cook, after which Cook explored New Zealand and Australia. This was one of five expeditions organised by the Royal Society and Maskelyne.)

D'Auteroche went to San José del Cabo in what was then New Spain to observe the transit with two Spanish astronomers (Vicente de Doz and Salvador de Medina). For his trouble he died in an epidemic of yellow fever there shortly after completing his observations. Only 9 of 28 in the entire party returned home alive. Le Gentil spent over eight years travelling in an attempt to observe either of the transits. Whilst abroad he was declared dead, and as a result he lost his wife and possessions. Upon his return he regained his seat in the French Academy and remarried. Under the influence of the Royal Society, the astronomer Ruđer Bošković travelled to Istanbul, but arrived after the transit had happened.

In 1771, using the combined 1761 and 1769 transit data, the French astronomer Jérôme Lalande calculated the astronomical unit to have a value of 153 ± 1 million kilometres (95.07 ± 0.62 million miles). The precision was less than had been hoped for because of the black drop effect. The value obtained was still an improvement on the calculations made by Horrocks. (Note: The black drop effect distorts the image of Venus at the observed edge of the Sun. The effect is caused by turbulence in the Earth's atmosphere, imperfections in the viewing apparatus, or the extreme change in brightness at the edge of the Sun.) Hell published his results in 1770, which included a value for the astronomical unit of 151.7 million kilometres (94.3 million miles). Lalande challenged the accuracy and authenticity of observations obtained by the Hell expedition, but later wrote an article in Journal des sçavans (1778), in which he retracted his comments.

=== 1874 and 1882 transits ===
Observations of the transits of 1874 and 1882 worked to refine the value obtained for the astronomical unit. Three expeditions—from Germany, the United Kingdom, and the United States—were sent to the Kerguelen Archipelago for the 1874 observations. The American astronomer Simon Newcomb combined the data from the last four transits, and he arrived at a value of 149.59 ± 0.31 million kilometres (92.95 ± 0.19 million miles). (Note: The need for parallax calculations has been superseded, as modern techniques, such as the use of radio telemetry from space probes and of radar measurements of the distances to planets and asteroids in the Solar System, have allowed a value for the AU to be calculated to a precision of about ±30 metres (98 ft).)

=== 2004 and 2012 transits ===
The transit of Venus, June 2012

Scientific organisations led by the European Southern Observatory organised a network of amateur astronomers and students to measure Earth's distance from the Sun during the transit of 2004. The participants' observations allowed a calculation of the astronomical unit (au) of 149,608,708 ± 11,835 kilometres (92,962,541 ± 7,354 miles), which differed from the accepted value by 0.007%.

During the 2004 transit, scientists attempted to measure the loss of light as Venus blocked out some of the Sun's light, in order to refine techniques for discovering extrasolar planets.

The 2012 transit provided scientists with further research opportunities, in particular the study of exoplanets. The event was the first of its kind to be documented from space, photographed aboard the International Space Station by NASA astronaut Don Pettit. The measurement of the dips in a star's brightness during a transit is one observation that can help astronomers find exoplanets. Unlike the 2004 Venus transit, the 2012 transit occurred during an active phase of the 11-year activity cycle of the Sun, and it gave astronomers an opportunity to practise picking up a planet's signal around a "spotty" variable star. Measurements made of the apparent diameter of a planet such as Venus during a transit allows scientists to estimate exoplanet sizes. Observation made of the atmosphere of Venus from Earth-based telescopes and the Venus Express gave scientists a better opportunity to understand the intermediate level of Venus's atmosphere than was possible from either viewpoint alone, and provided new information about the climate of the planet. Spectrographic data of the atmosphere of Venus can be compared to studies of the atmospheres of exoplanets. The Hubble Space Telescope used the Moon as a mirror to study light from the atmosphere of Venus, and so determine its composition.

== Future transits ==
Date(s) of transit	Time (UTC)			Notes
Date(s) of transit	Start	Mid	End	Notes
10–11 December 2117	23:58	02:48	05:38	Visible in entirety in eastern China, Korea, Japan, south of Russian Far East, Taiwan, Indonesia, the Philippines, and Australia. Partly visible in Central Asia, the Middle East, south part of Russia, in India, most of Africa, and on extreme West Coast of North America.
8 December 2125	13:15	16:01	18:48	Visible in entirety in South America and the eastern North America. Partly visible in Western North America, Europe, Africa, and Oceania.
11 June 2247	08:42	11:33	14:25	Visible in entirety in Africa, Europe, and the Middle East. Partly visible in East Asia and Indonesia, and in North and South America.
9 June 2255	01:08	04:38	08:08	Visible in entirety in Russia, India, China, and western Australia. Partly visible in Africa, Europe, and western North America.
12–13 December 2360	22:32	01:44	04:56	Visible in entirety in Australia and most of Indonesia. Partly visible in Asia, Africa, and the western half of the Americas.
10 December 2368	12:29	14:45	17:01	Visible in entirety in South America, western Africa, and the North American East Coast. Partly visible in Europe, the western North America, and the Middle East.
12 June 2490	11:39	14:17	16:55	Visible in entirety through most of the Americas, western Africa, and Europe. Partly visible in eastern Africa, the Middle East, and Asia.
10 June 2498	03:48	07:25	11:02	Visible in entirety through most of Europe, Asia, the Middle East, and eastern Africa. Partly visible in eastern Americas, Indonesia, and Australia.

Transits usually occur in pairs, because the length of eight Earth years is almost the same as 13 years on Venus. This approximate conjunction is not precise enough to produce a triplet, as Venus arrives 22 hours earlier each time. The last transit not to be part of a pair was in 1396 (the planet passed slightly above the disc of the Sun in 1388); the next one will be in 3089.

After 243 years the transits of Venus return. The 1874 transit is a member of the 243-year cycle #1. The 1882 transit is a member of #2. The 2004 transit is a member of #3, and the 2012 transit is a member of #4. The 2117 transit is a member of #1, and so on. However, the ascending node (December transits) of the orbit of Venus moves backwards after each 243 years so the transit of 2854 is the last member of series #3 instead of series #1. The descending node (June transits) moves forwards, so the transit of 3705 is the last member of #2.

Over longer periods of time, new series of transits will start and old series will end. Unlike the saros series for solar and lunar eclipses, it is possible for a transit series to restart after a hiatus. The transit series also vary much more in length than the saros series.

== Grazing and simultaneous transits ==
Sometimes Venus only grazes the Sun during a transit. In this case it is possible that in some areas of the Earth a full transit can be seen while in other regions there is only a partial transit (no second or third contact). The last transit of this type was on 6 December 1631, and the next such transit will occur on 13 December 2611. It is also possible that a transit of Venus can be seen in some parts of the world as a partial transit, while in others Venus misses the Sun. Such a transit last occurred on 19 November 541 BC, and the next transit of this type will occur on 14 December 2854. These effects are due to parallax, since the size of the Earth affords different points of view with slightly different lines of sight to Venus and the Sun. It can be demonstrated by closing an eye and holding a finger in front of a smaller more distant object; when the viewer opens the other eye and closes the first, the finger will no longer be in front of the object.

The simultaneous occurrence of transits of Mercury and Venus does occur, but extremely infrequently. Such an event will next occur on 26 July 69,163, and again on 27–28 March 224,508. The simultaneous occurrence of a solar eclipse and a transit of Venus is currently possible, but very rare. The next solar eclipse occurring during a transit of Venus will be on 5 April 15,232.

== Commemoration ==
The Transit of Venus March was written by John Philip Sousa in 1883 to commemorate the 1882 transit.

== See also ==
- Transit of Mercury
- Transit of minor planets

== Sources ==
- Anderson, Mark (2012). The Day the World Discovered the Sun: An Extraordinary Story of Scientific Adventure and the Race to Track the Transit of Venus. Da Capo Press. ISBN 978-0-306-82038-0.
- Howse, Derek (1989). Nevil Maskelyne: The Seaman's Astronomer. Cambridge, UK: Cambridge University Press. ISBN 052136261X.
- Galindo Trejo, Jesús; Allen, Christine (2005). "Maya Observations of the 13th Century transits of Venus?". Proceedings of the International Astronomical Union. 196. International Astronomical Union: 124–137. Bibcode:2005tvnv.conf..124G. doi:10.1017/S1743921305001328. ISSN 1743-9213. S2CID 128694758.
- Meeus, J.; Vitagliano, A. (2004). "Simultaneous transits". Journal of the British Astronomical Association. 114 (3): 132–135. Bibcode:2004JBAA..114..132M.
