= 2012 transit of Venus =

Transit of Venus across the Sun visible from Earth on 5–6 June 2012

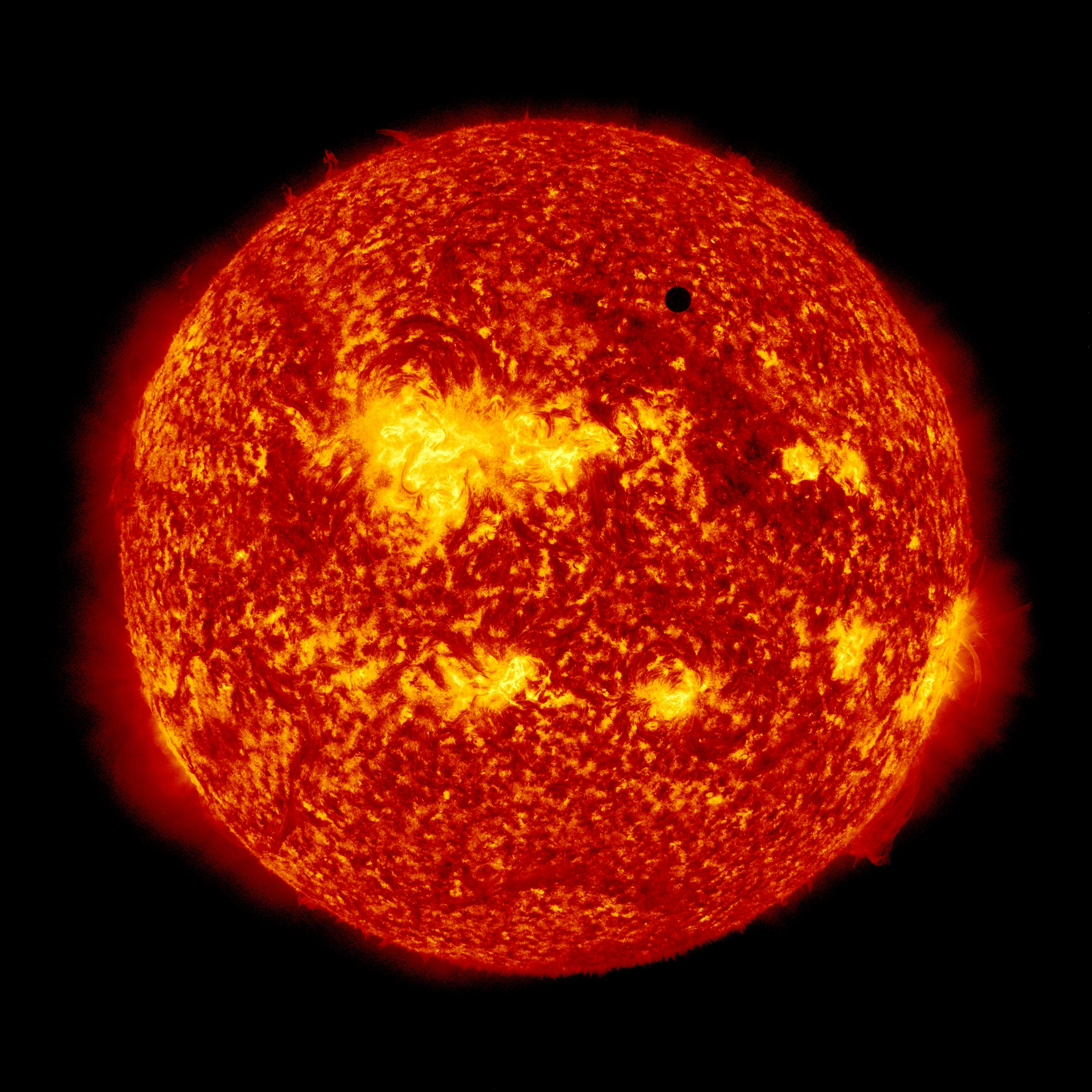
Image of the transit taken by NASA's Solar Dynamics Observatory spacecraft. Venus is in the upper right quadrant

The 2012 transit of Venus, when the planet Venus appeared as a small, dark spot passing across the face of the Sun, began at 22:09 UTC on 5 June 2012, and finished at 04:49 UTC on 6 June. Depending on the position of the observer, the exact times varied by up to ±7 minutes. Transits of Venus are among the rarest of predictable celestial phenomena and occur in pairs. Consecutive transits per pair are spaced 8 years apart, and consecutive pairs occur more than a century apart: The previous transit of Venus took place on 8 June 2004 (preceded by transits on 9 December 1874 and 6 December 1882); the next pair of transits will occur on 10–11 December 2117 and December 2125 within the 22nd century.

== Observations of the event ==
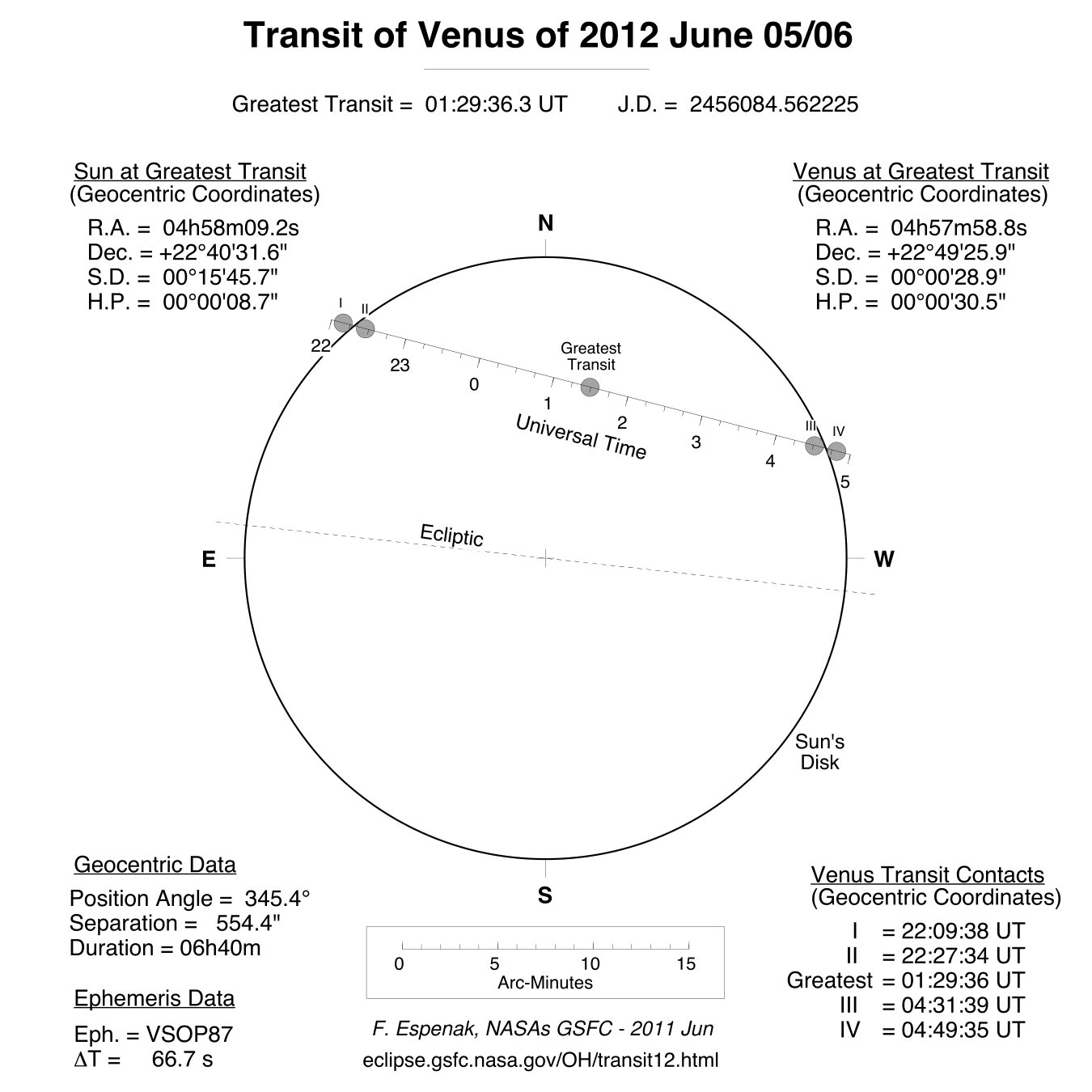
Path across the Sun, with contact times and other data

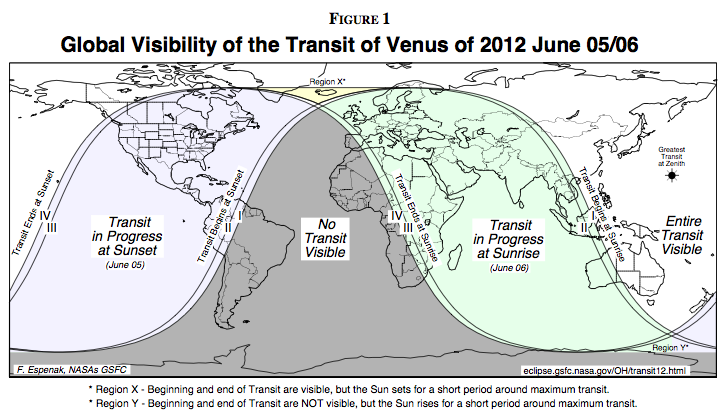
Visibility map

The entire transit was visible from the western Pacific Ocean, northwesternmost North America, northeastern Asia, Japan, the Philippines, eastern Australia, New Zealand, and high Arctic locations including northernmost Scandinavia, and Greenland. In North America, the Caribbean, and northwestern South America, the beginning of the transit was visible on 5 June until sunset. From sunrise on 6 June, the end of the transit was visible from South Asia, the Middle East, east Africa, and most of Europe. The phenomenon was not visible from most of South America, nor from western Africa. There were a number of live online video streams with footage from telescopes around the world. Midway through the transit one of the NASA streams had nearly 2 million total views and was getting roughly 90,000 viewers at any given moment.

In Los Angeles, crowds jammed Mount Hollywood where the Griffith Observatory set up telescopes for the public to view the transit. In Hawaii, hundreds of tourists watched the event on Waikiki Beach where the University of Hawaiʻi set up eight telescopes and two large screens showing webcasts of the transit. The transit was also observed and historically photographed by NASA astronaut Don Pettit aboard the International Space Station.

NASA's Solar and Heliospheric Observatory could not see the transit as it was not in between the Earth and the Sun at the time of the event, but high-definition images of the event were obtained by Solar Dynamics Observatory, from 36,000 km (22,000 mi) above the Earth. Agency astrophysicist Dr. Lika Guhathakurta said, "We get to see Venus in exquisite detail because of SDO's spatial resolution, SDO is a very special observatory. It takes images that are about 10 times better than a high-definition TV and those images are acquired at a temporal cadence of one every 10 seconds. This is something we've never had before".

== Research ==
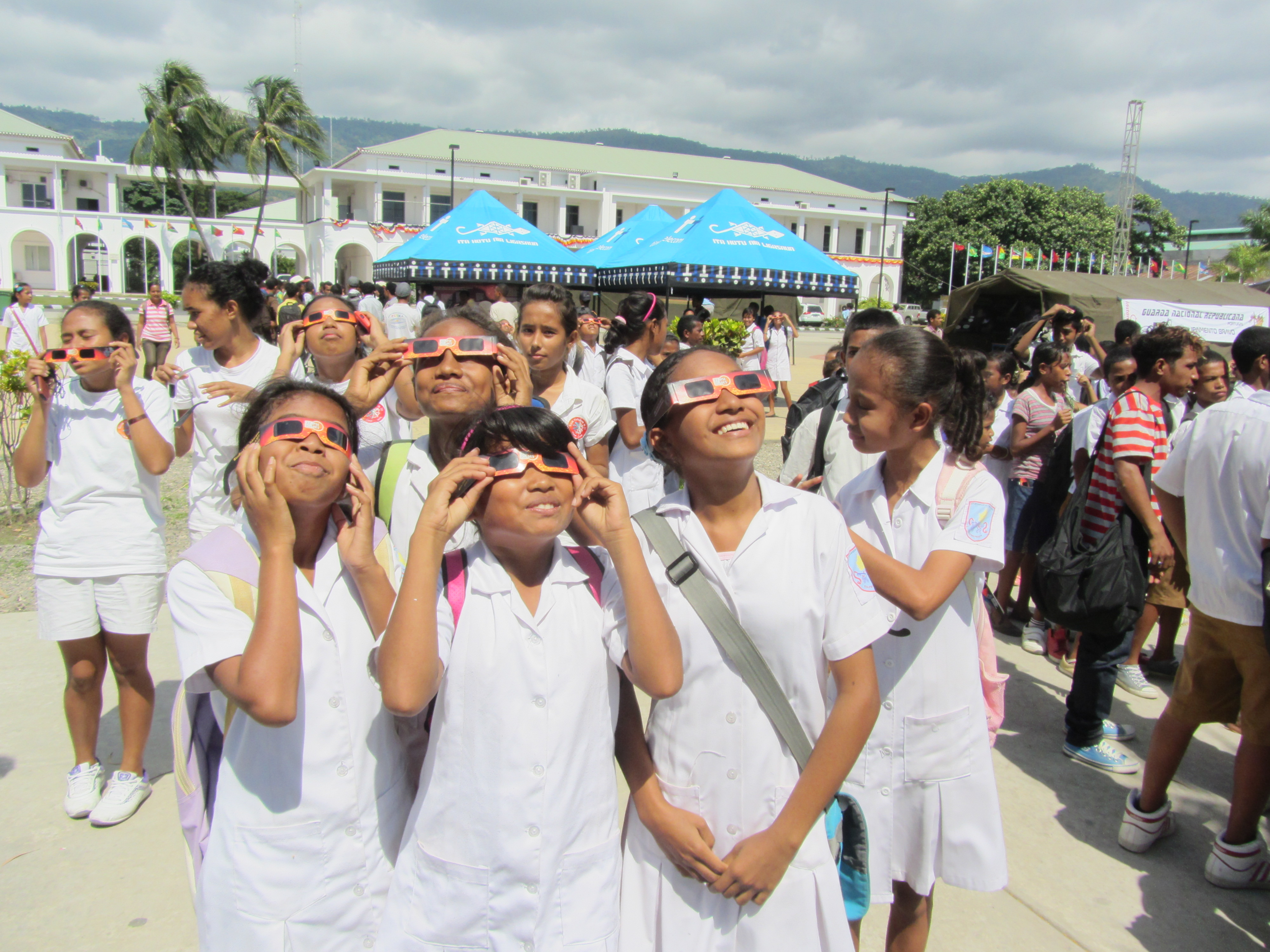
Children in Dili observing the transit of Venus

The 2012 transit gave scientists a number of research opportunities. These included:

- Measurement of dips in a star's brightness caused by a known planet transiting a known star (the Sun). This will help astronomers when searching for exoplanets. Unlike the 2004 Venus transit, the 2012 transit occurred during an active phase of the 11-year activity cycle of the Sun, and would have provided practice in detecting a planet's signal around a "spotty" variable star.
- Measurement of the apparent diameter of Venus during the transit, and comparison with its known diameter. This will have given information on how to estimate exoplanet sizes.
- The number of locations documenting the event will provide much data via parallax that will generate more accurate measurements.
- Observation of the atmosphere of Venus simultaneously from Earth-based telescopes and from the Venus Express spacecraft. This gave a better opportunity to understand the intermediate level of Venus's atmosphere than is possible from either viewpoint alone, and should provide new information about the climate of the planet.
- Spectrographic study of the atmosphere of Venus. The results of analysis of the well-understood atmosphere of Venus will be compared with studies of exoplanets with atmospheres that are unknown.
- The Hubble Space Telescope used the Moon as a mirror to study the light reflected from Venus to determine the makeup of its atmosphere. This may provide another technique to study exoplanets.
- Experimental reconstruction of Lomonosov's discovery of Venusian atmosphere (1761) with antique refractors. The researchers observed the "Lomonosov's arc" and other aureole effects due to Venus's atmosphere and concluded that Lomonosov's telescope was fully adequate to the task of detecting the arc of light around Venus off the Sun's disc during ingress or egress if proper experimental techniques as described by Lomonosov in his 1761 paper are employed.

== Gallery ==
=== North America ===
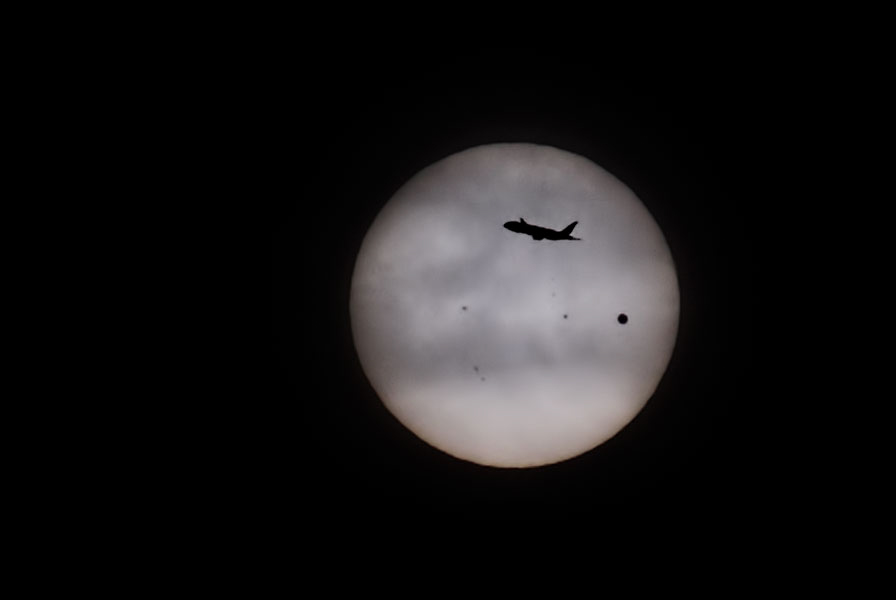
San Francisco, California, United States
Transit of airliner with Venus

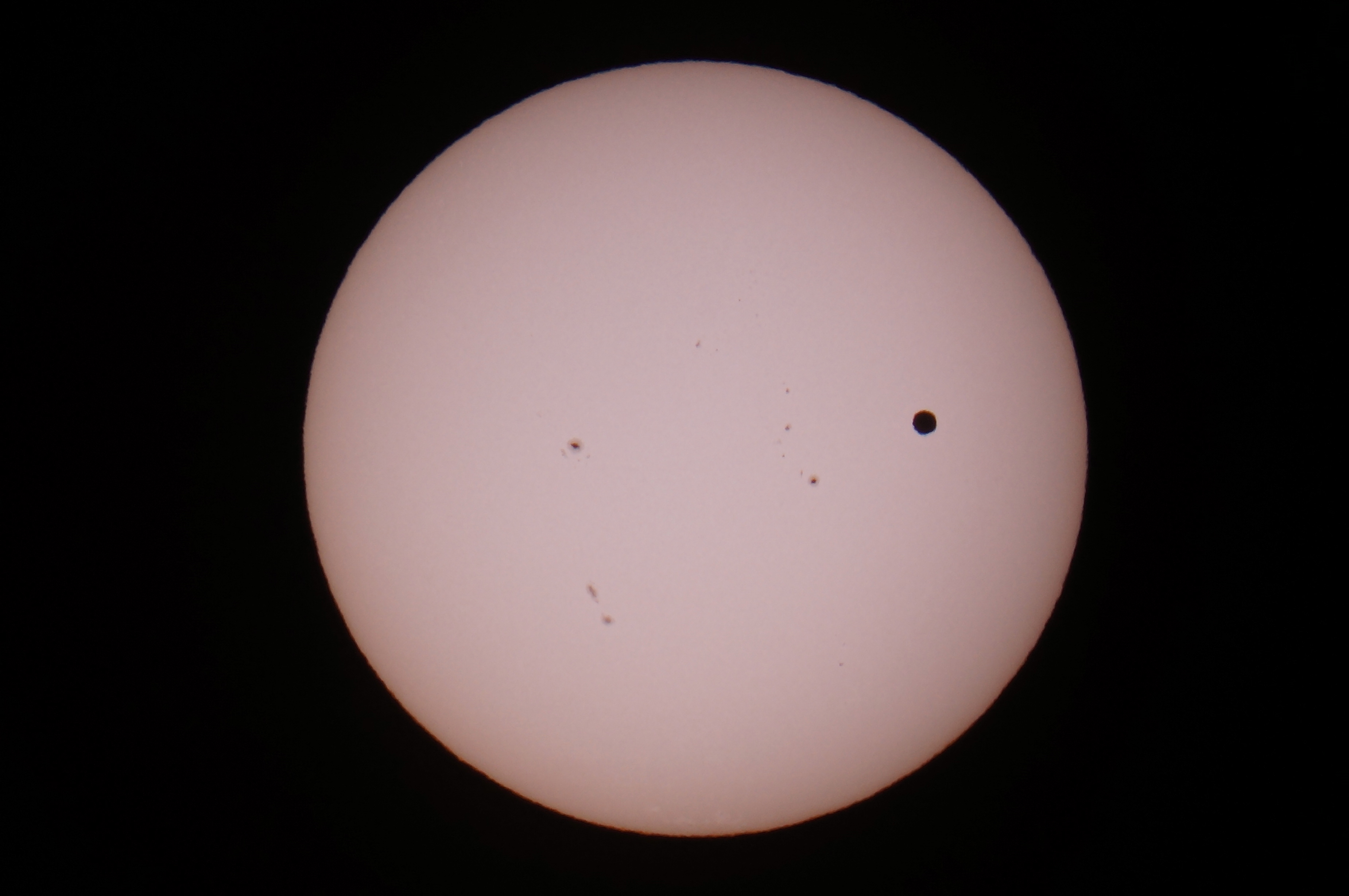
Tempe, Arizona, USA
01:54 UTC

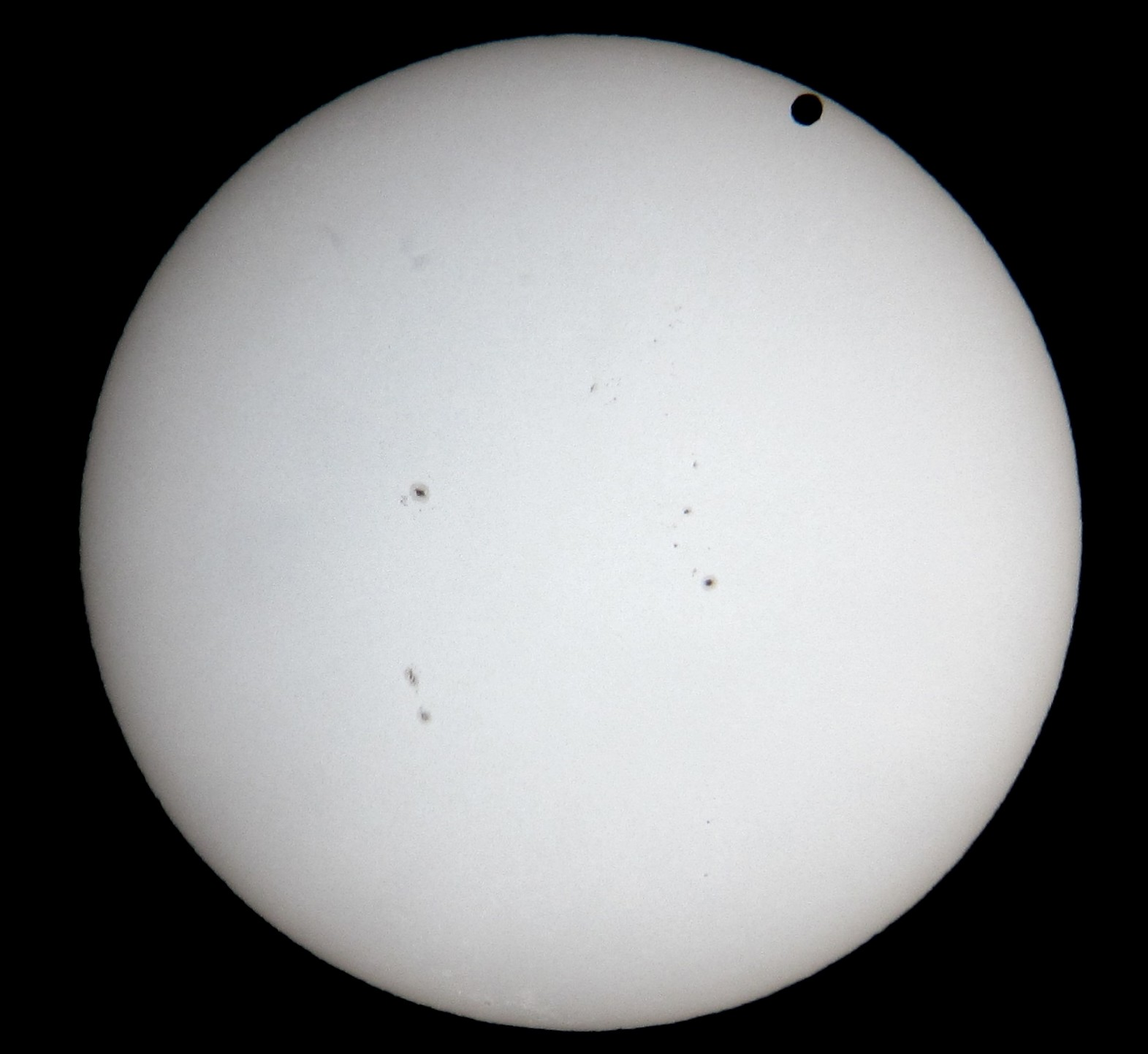
Wichita Falls, Texas, United States

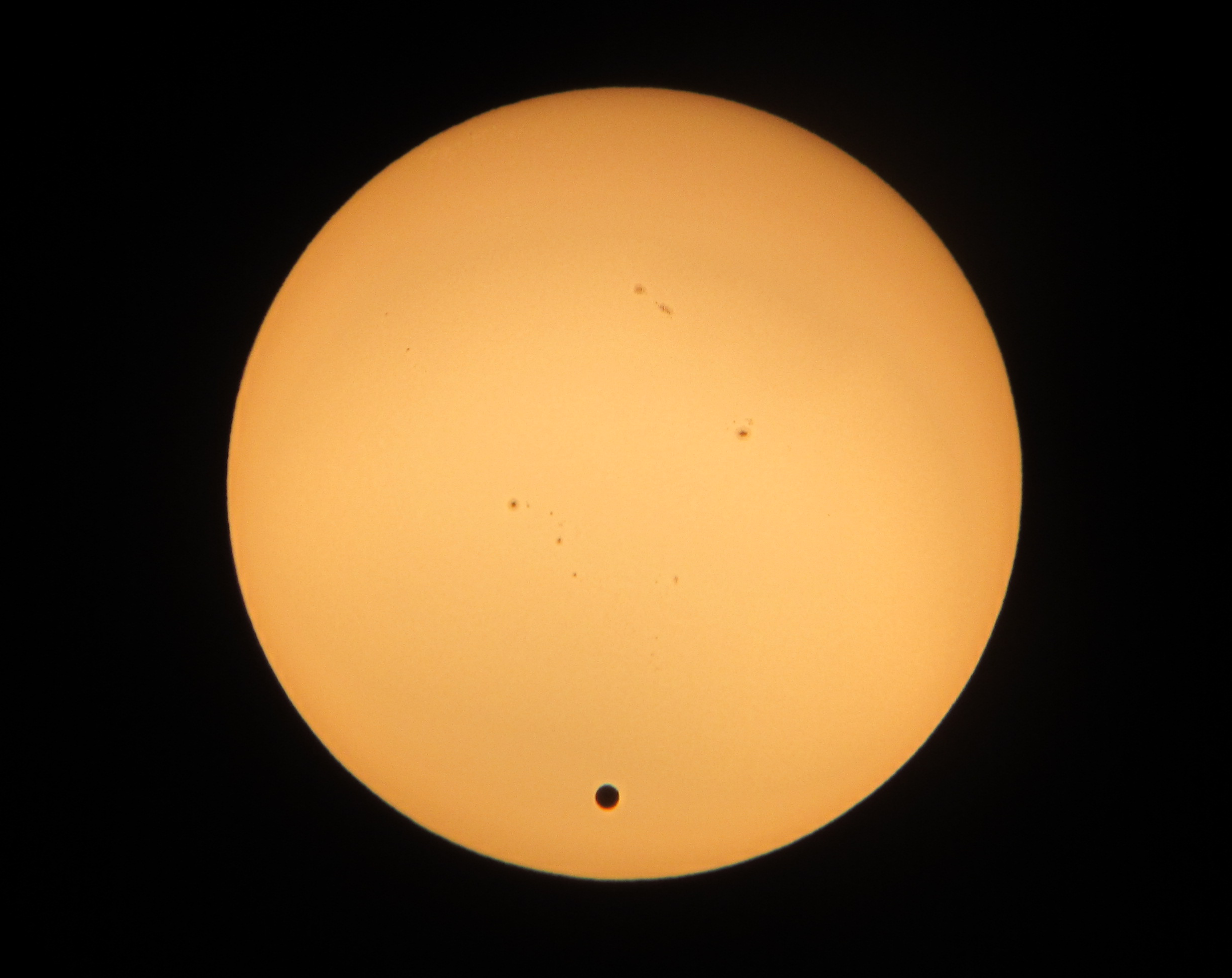
Fennell Observatory
Oakland, Tennessee, USA

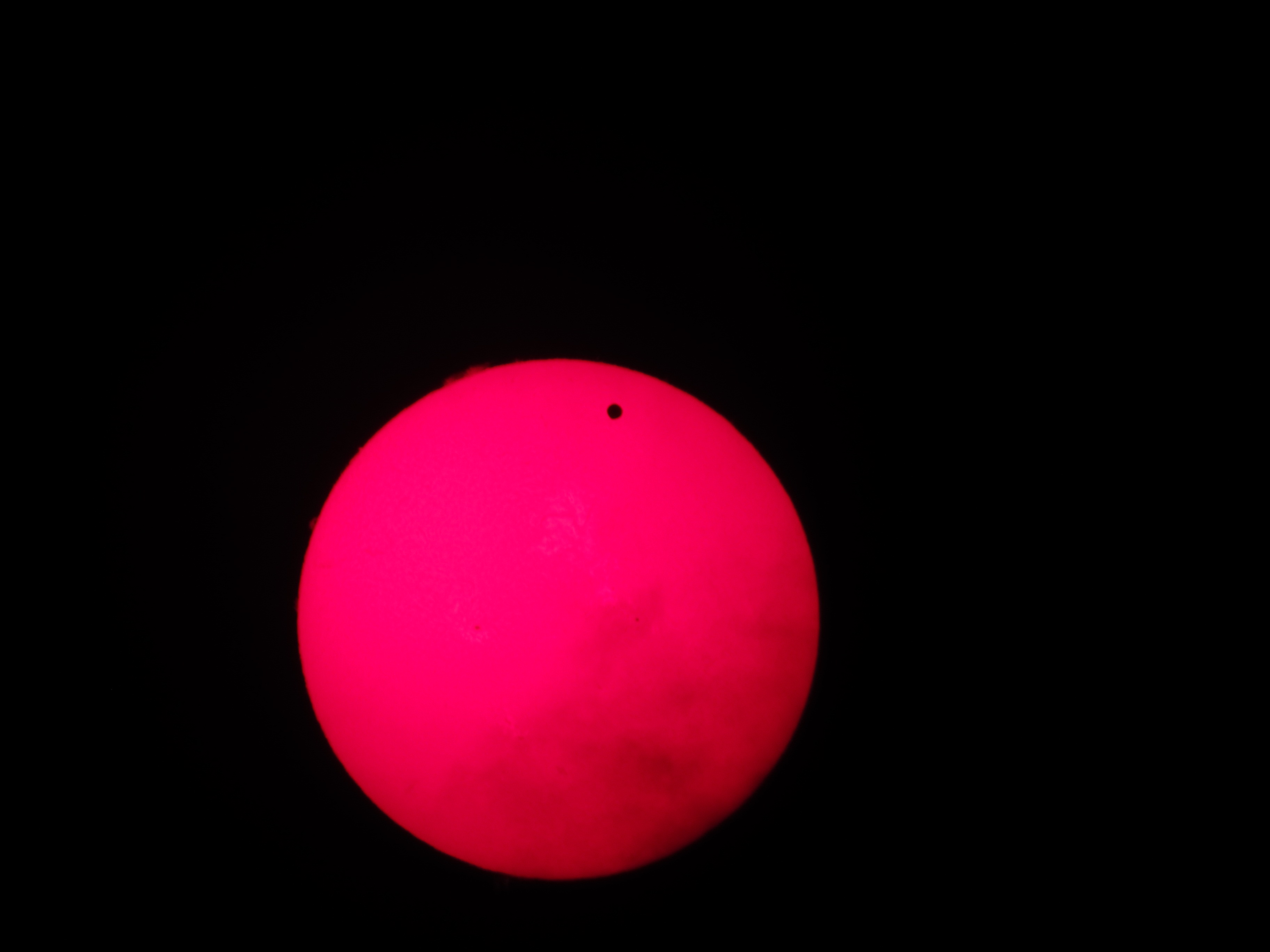
Toronto, Ontario, Canada
23:06 UTC

=== Europe ===
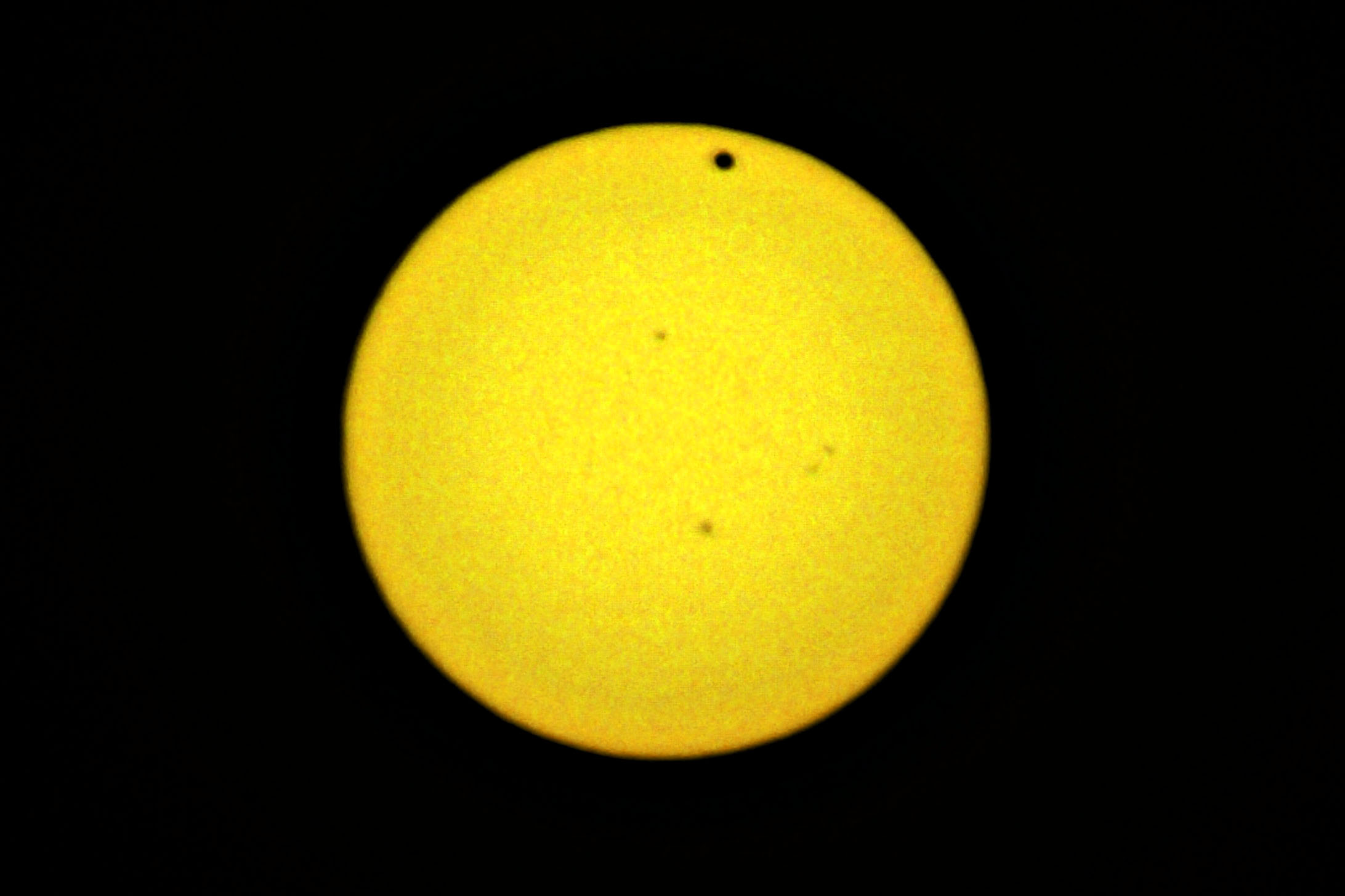
Ragusa, Sicily, Italy
04:11 UTC

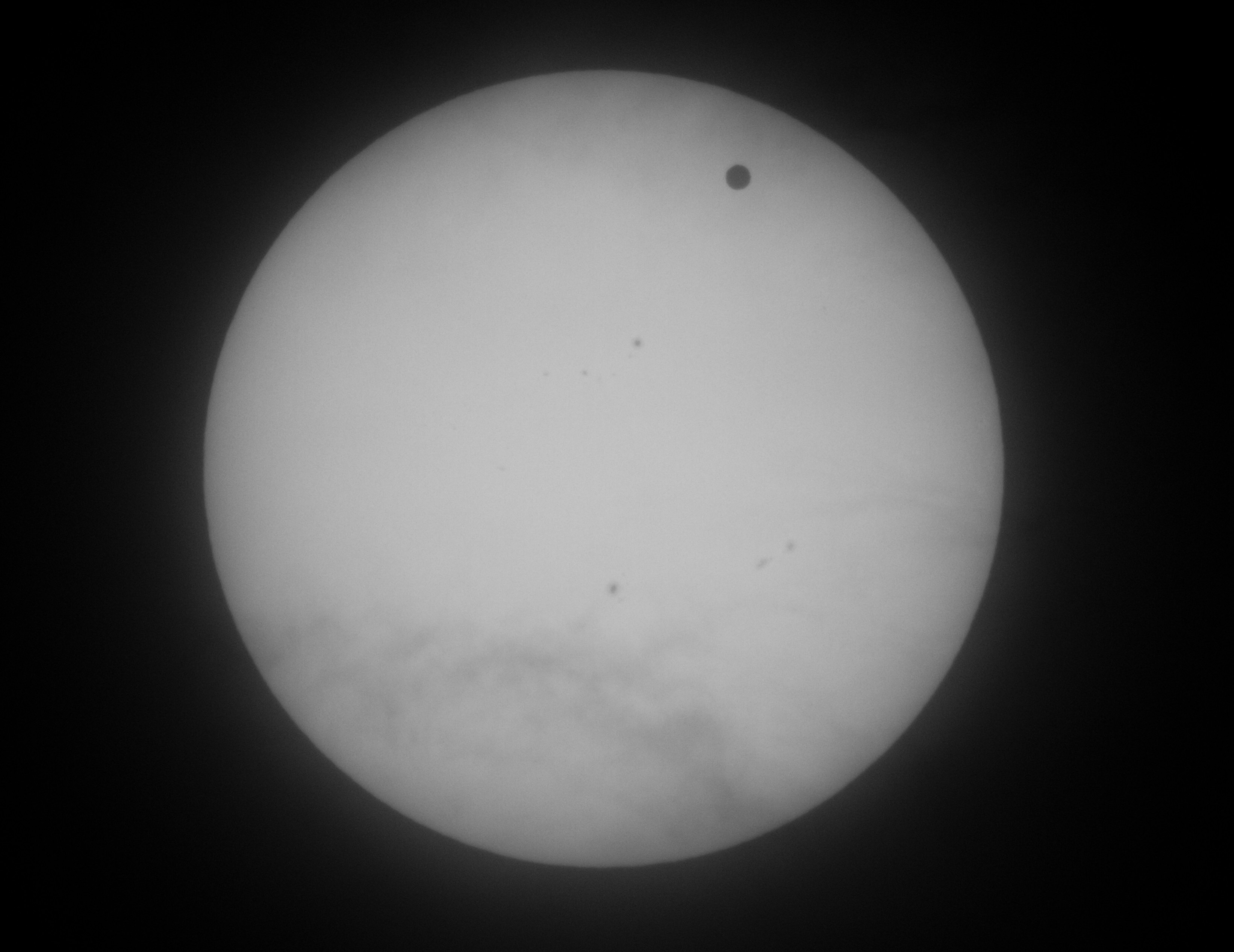
Moscow, Russia
03:47 UTC

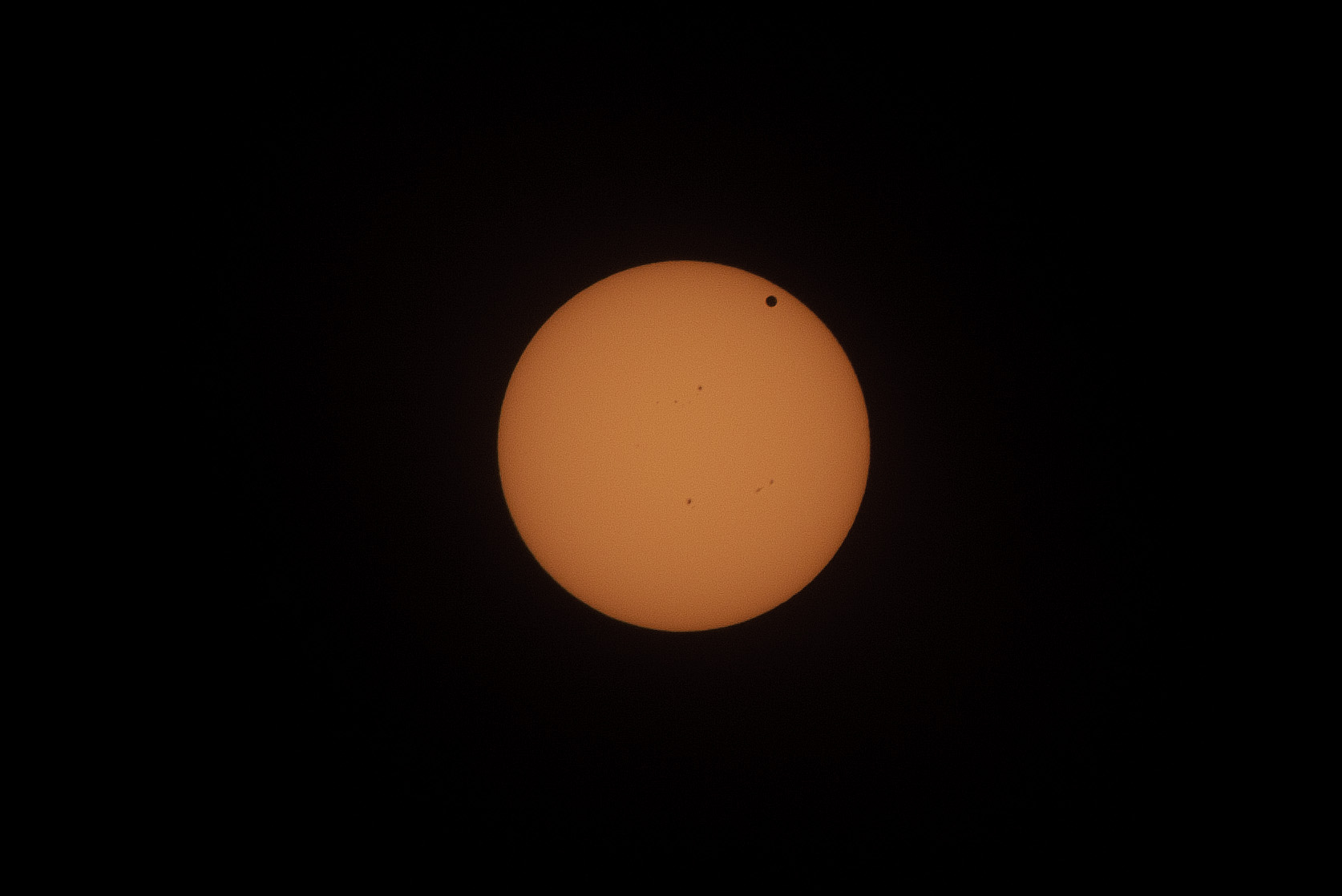
Helsingborg, Sweden
04:20 UTC

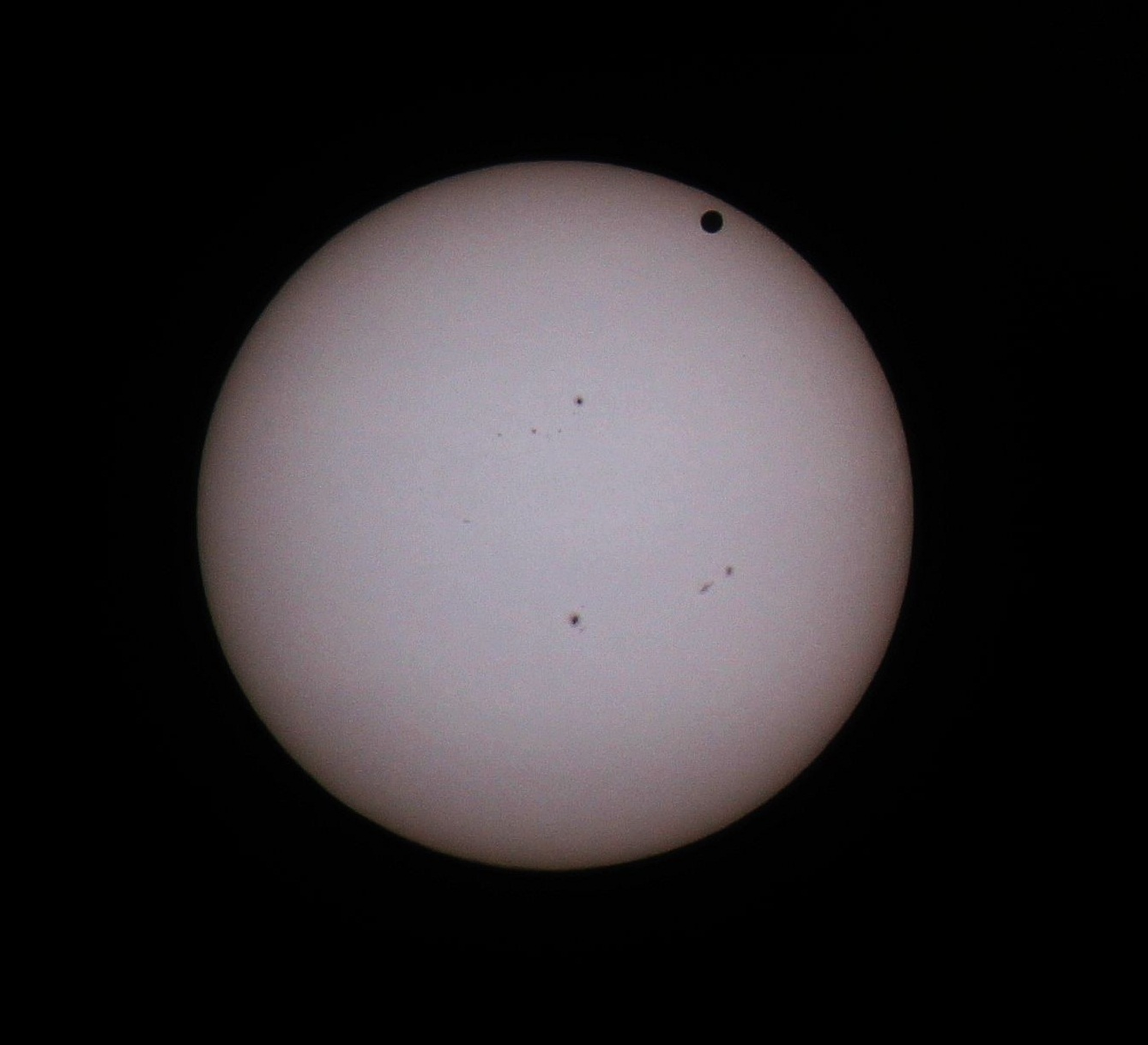
Úvaly, Czech Republic
04:26 UTC

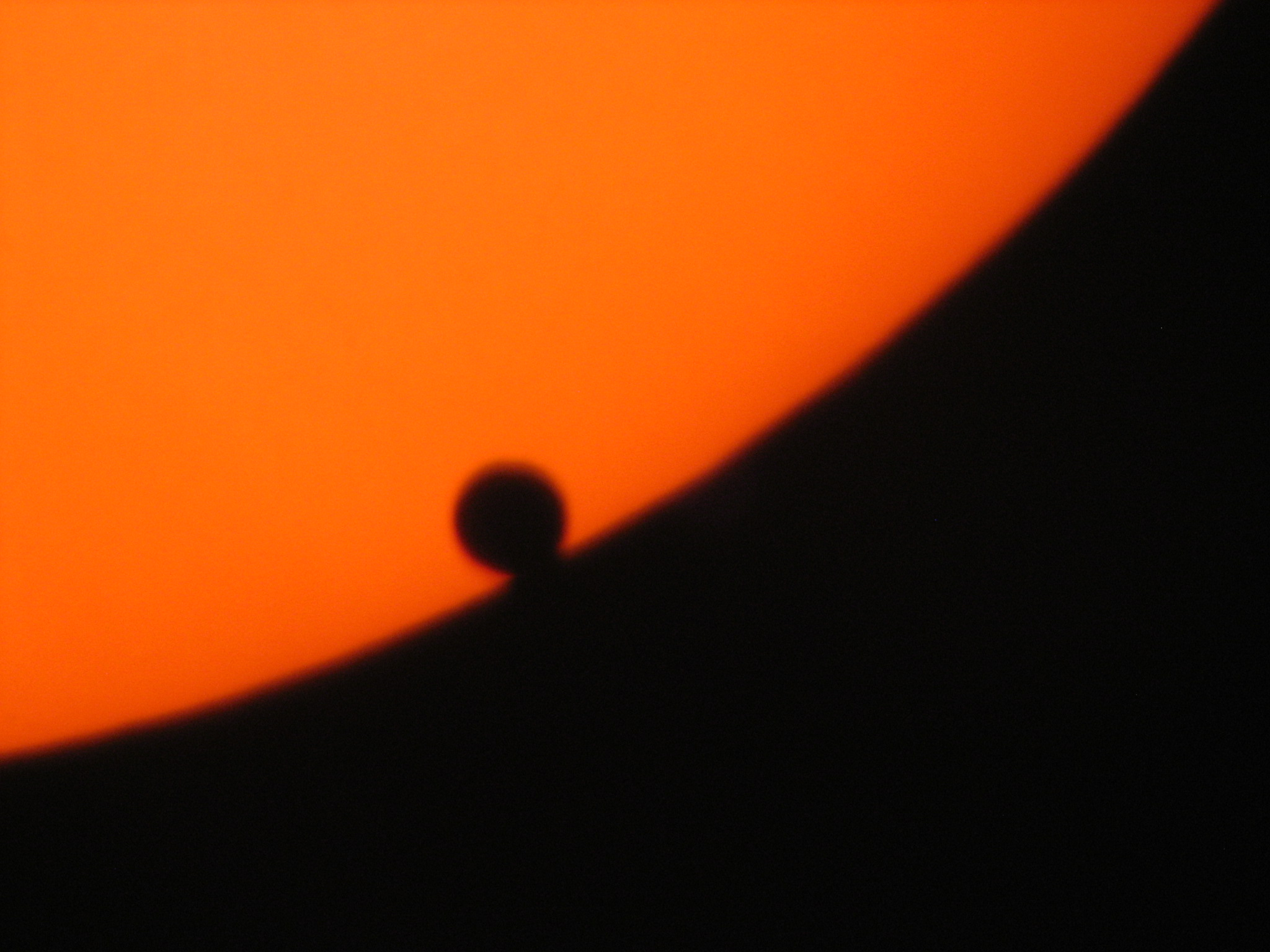
Kecskemét, Hungary
03:41 UTC

=== Asia ===
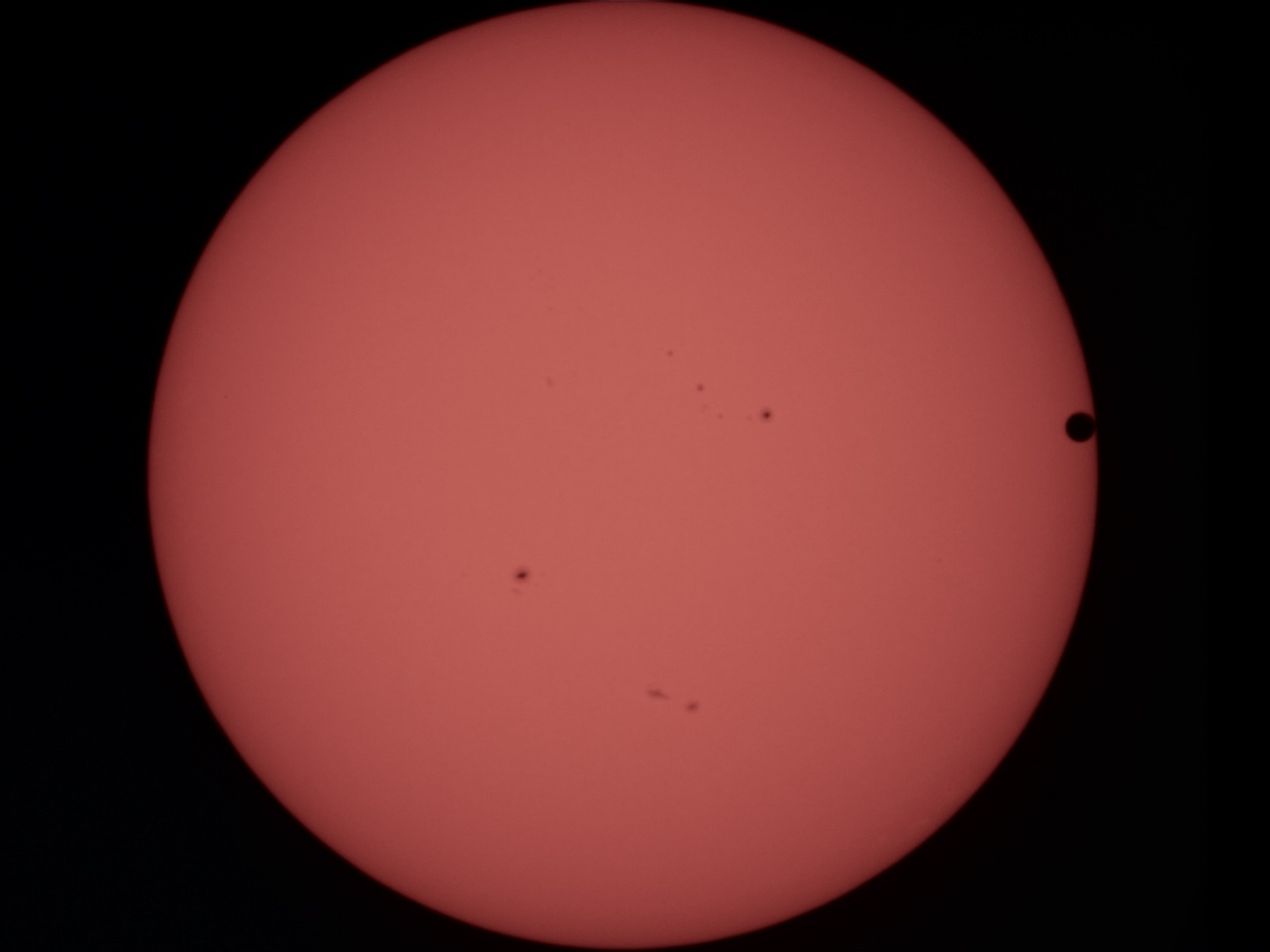
Kuwait City, Kuwait

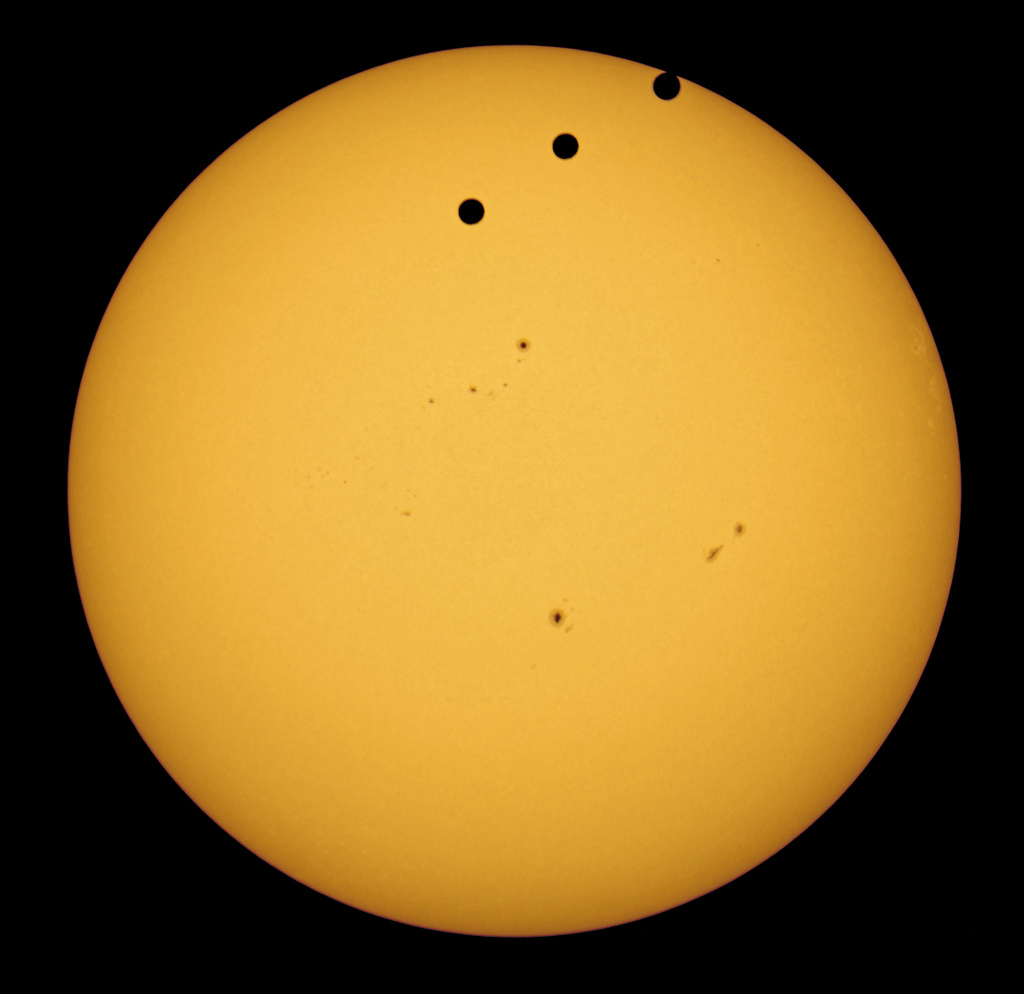
Amman, Jordan
Combination of 3 exposures

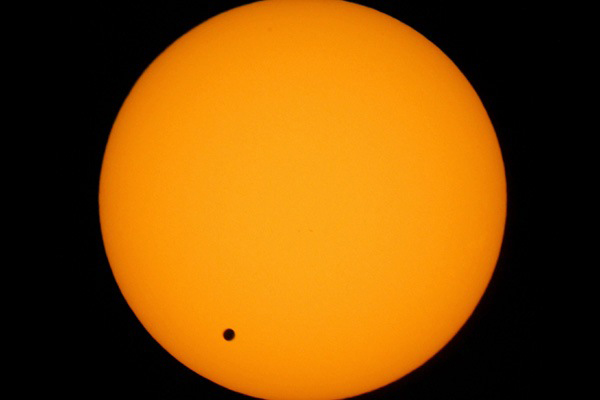
Delhi, India

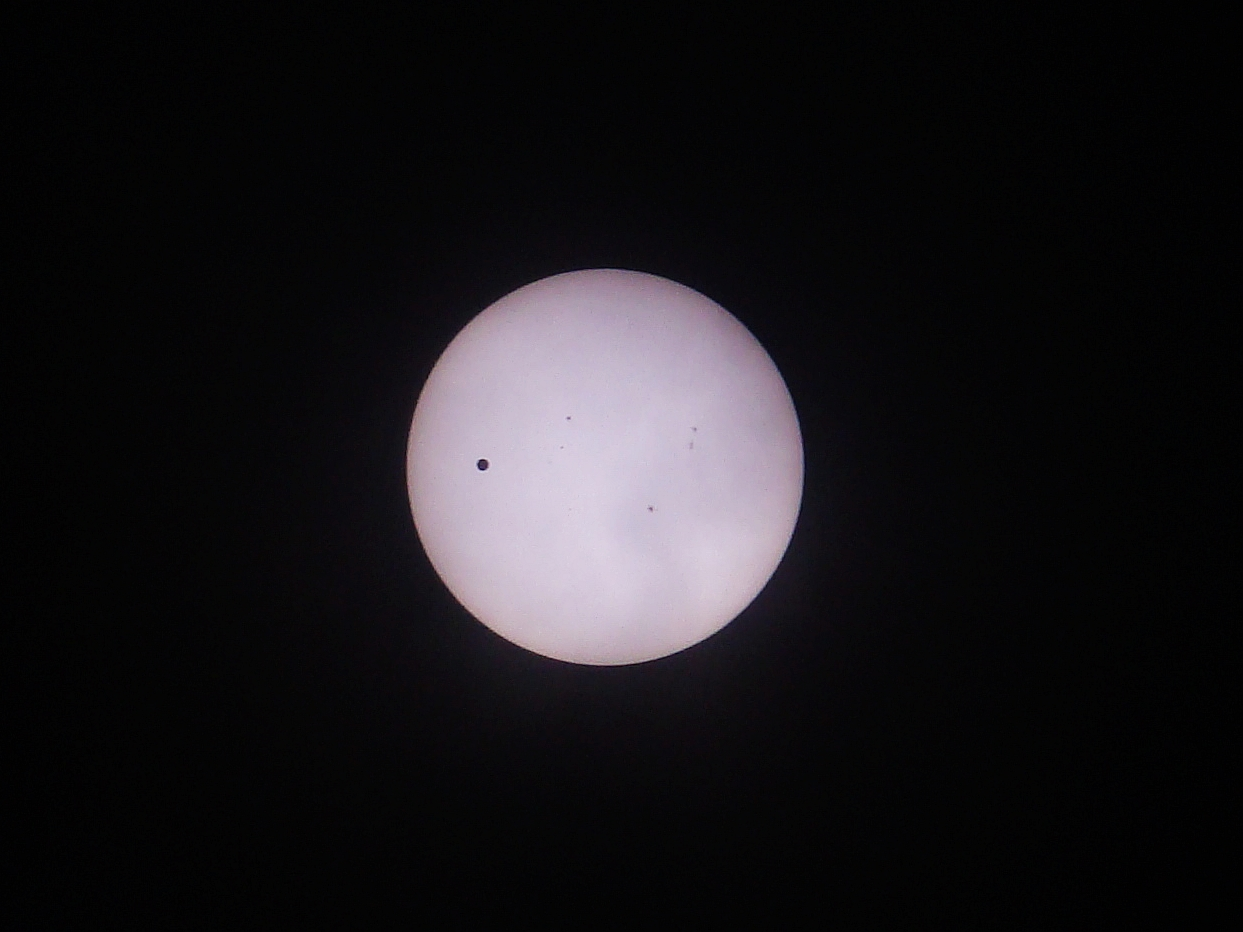
Guangzhou, China
00:41 UTC

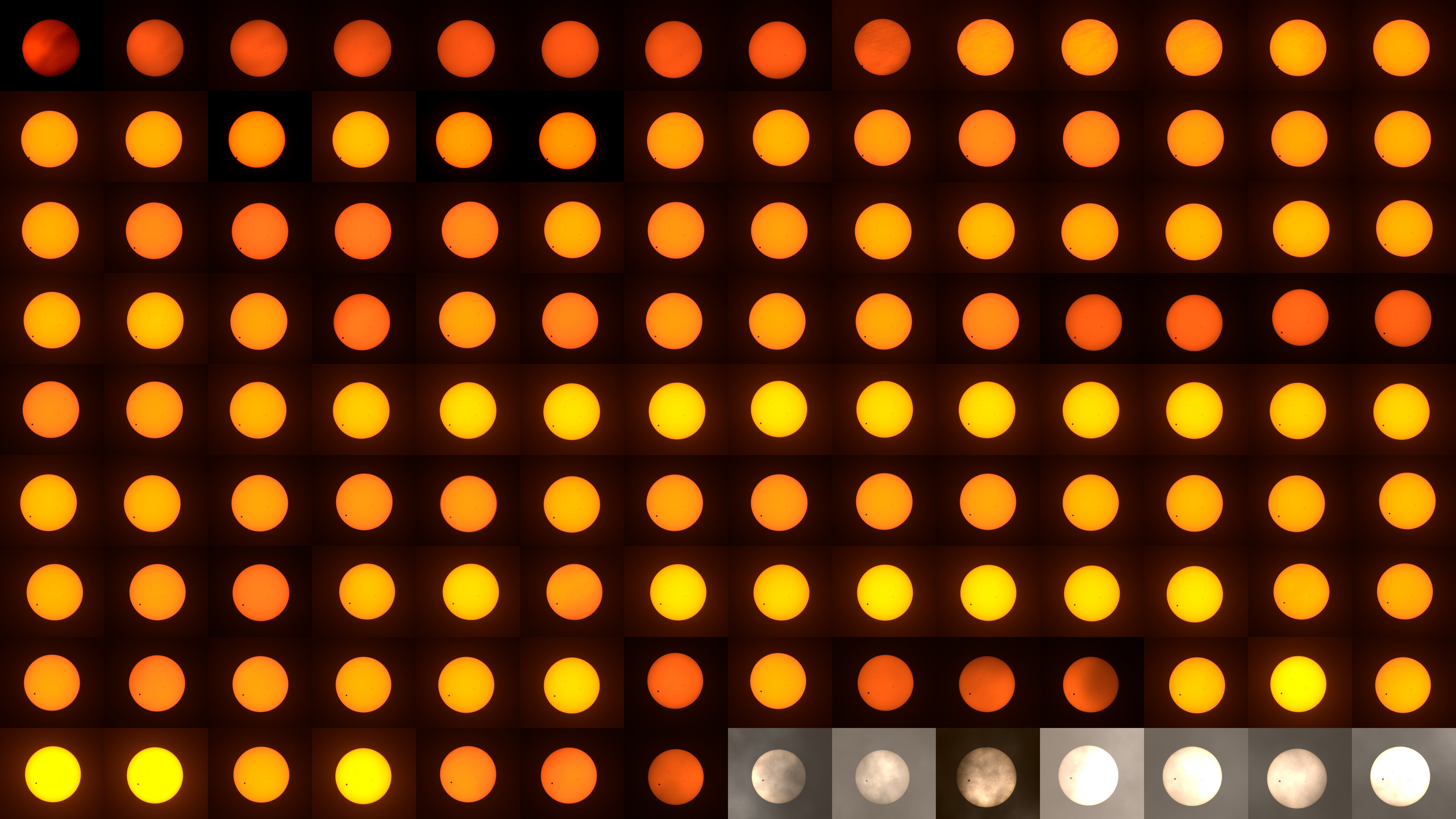
Photo sequence from Taichung, Taiwan

Video from Ussuriysk, Russia
00:08–04:43 UTC

Video from Handa, Aichi, Japan
23:36–04:50 UTC

=== Australasia ===
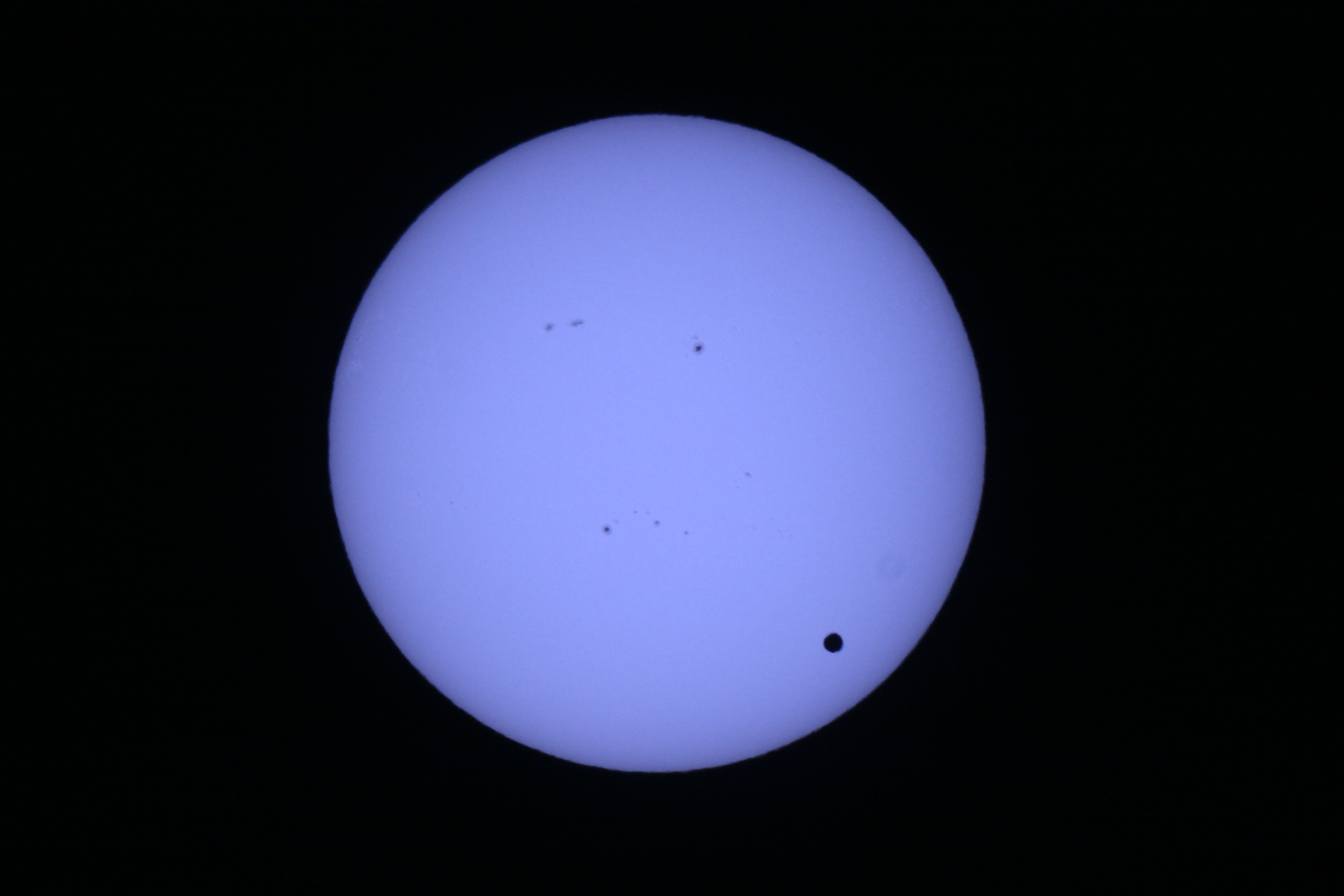
Sydney
23:25 UTC

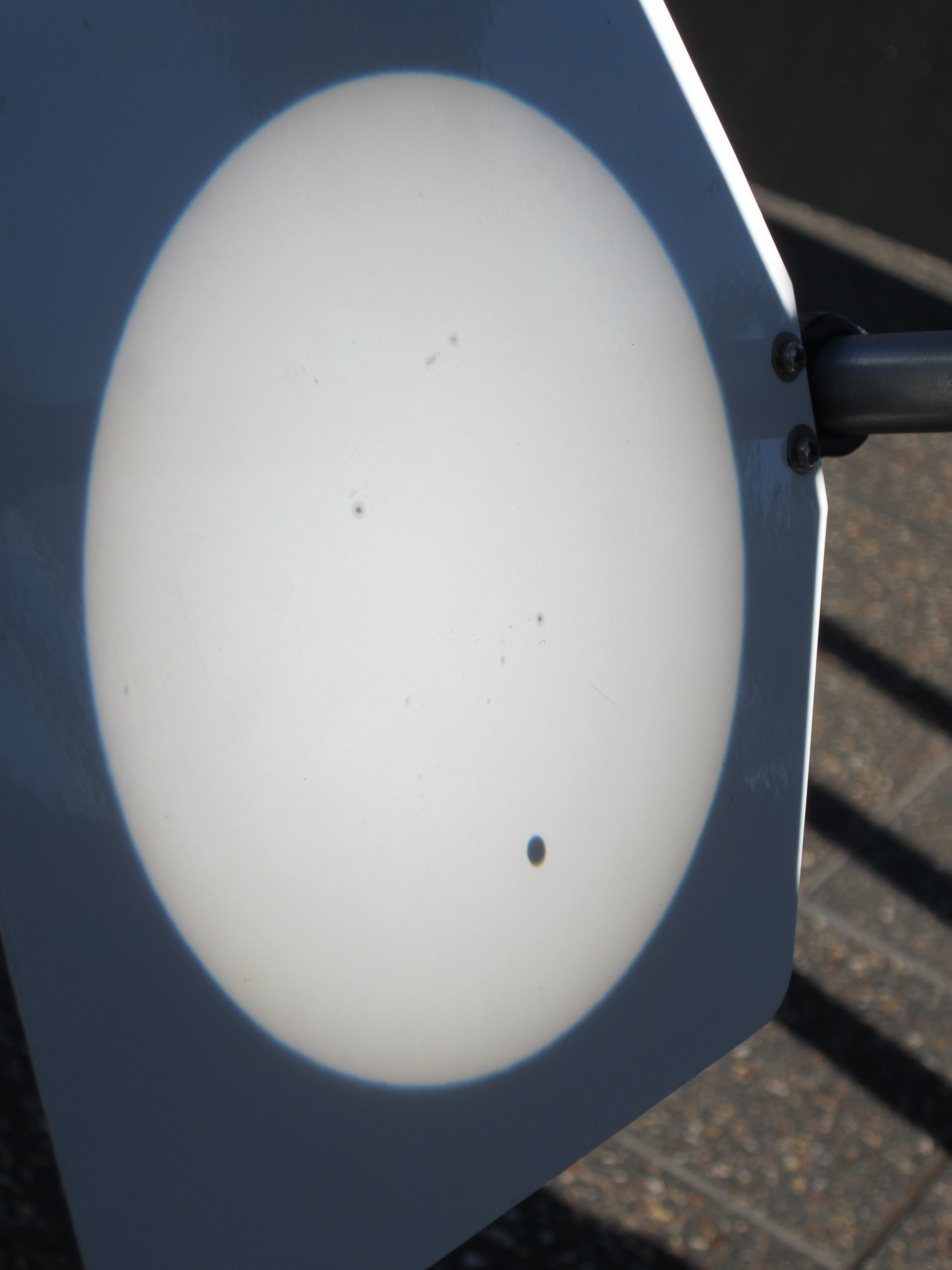
Wagga Wagga
00:49 UTC

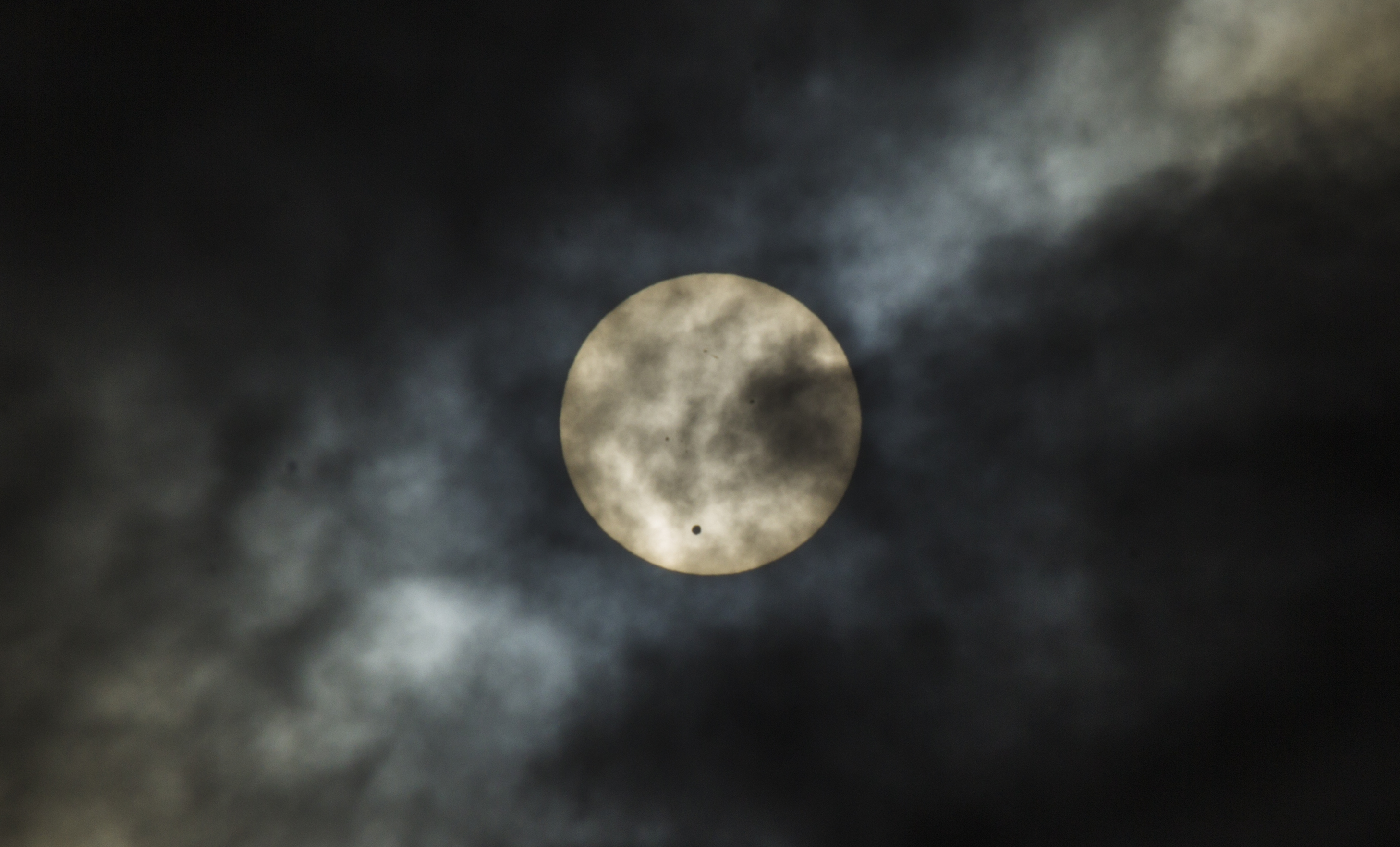
Clayton
01:06 UTC

=== Others ===
Solar Dynamics Observatory Ultra-high Definition View

This visualization shows the orbital paths of Venus and Earth that led to this rare alignment on 5–6 June 2012

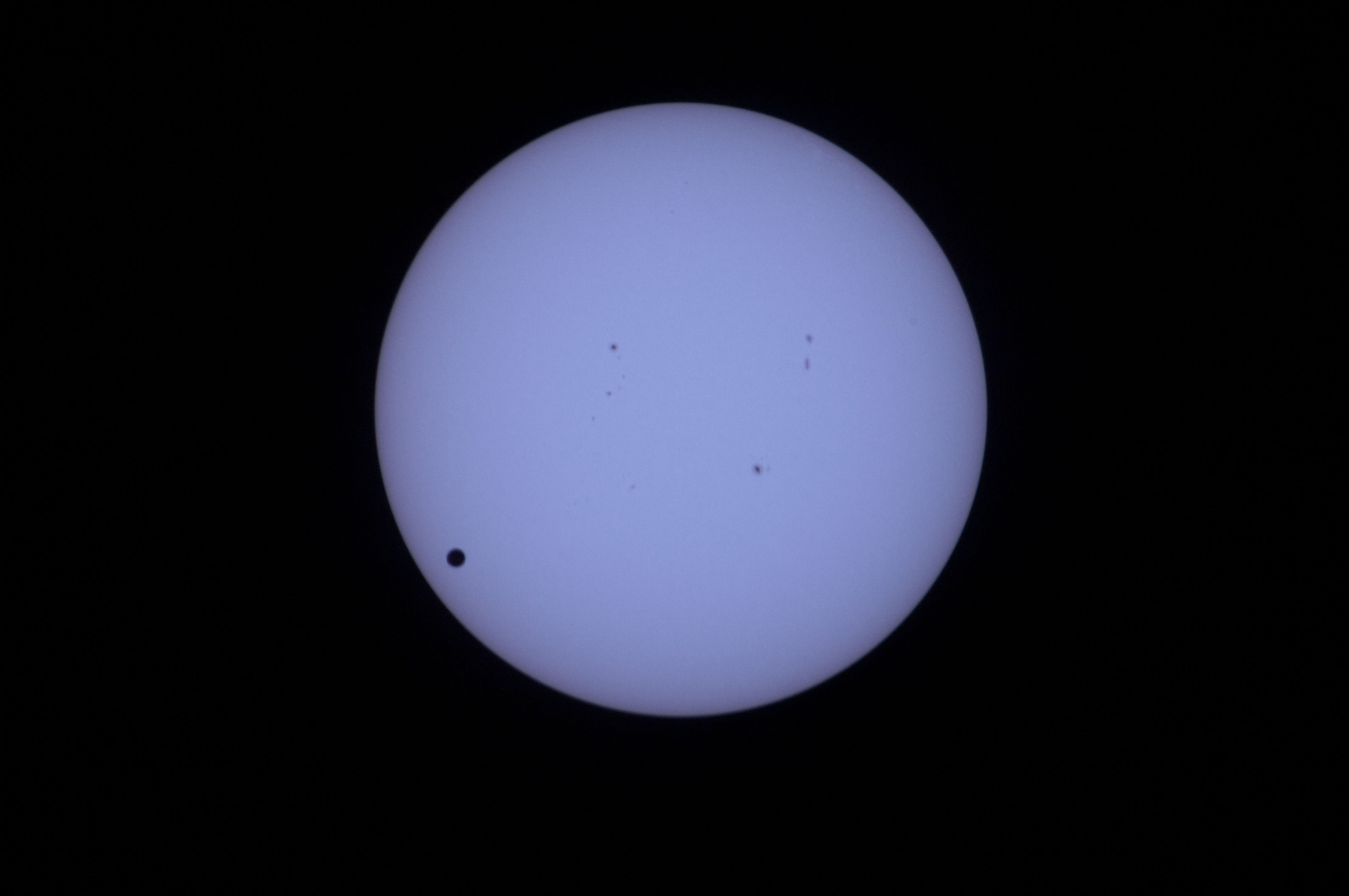
Venus transit, seen from the International Space Station.

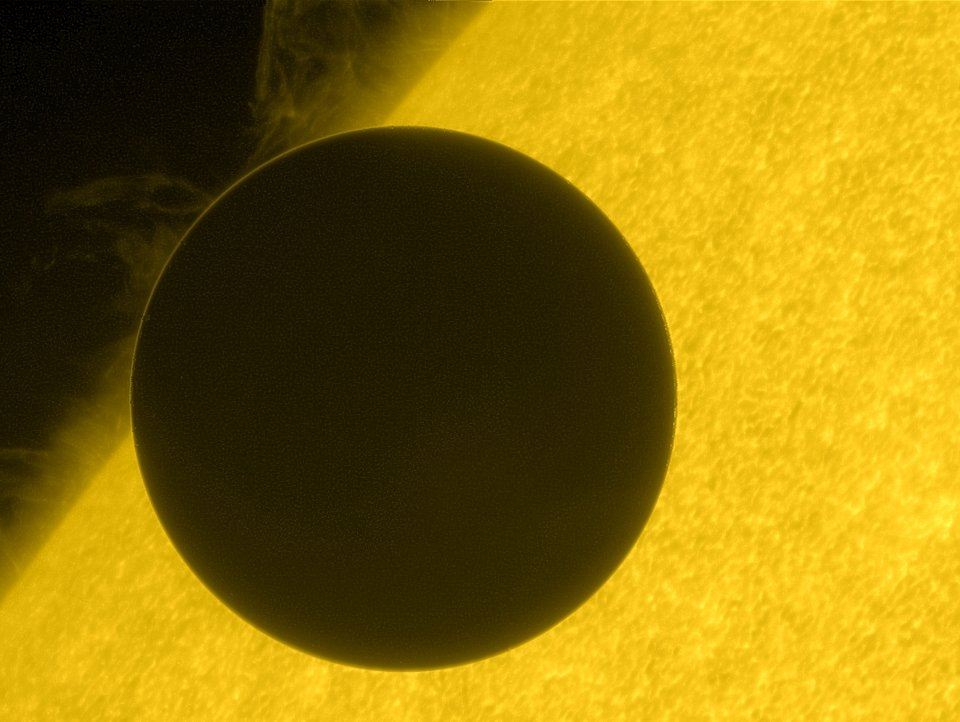
Close-up of Venus by the Japanese Hinode spacecraft on the Sun-synchronous orbit.

Visualization generated by compositing the small field-of-view, high-cadence closeups of Venus with the full-disk, low-cadence imagery from SDO.
