= 1882 transit of Venus =

Astronomical event

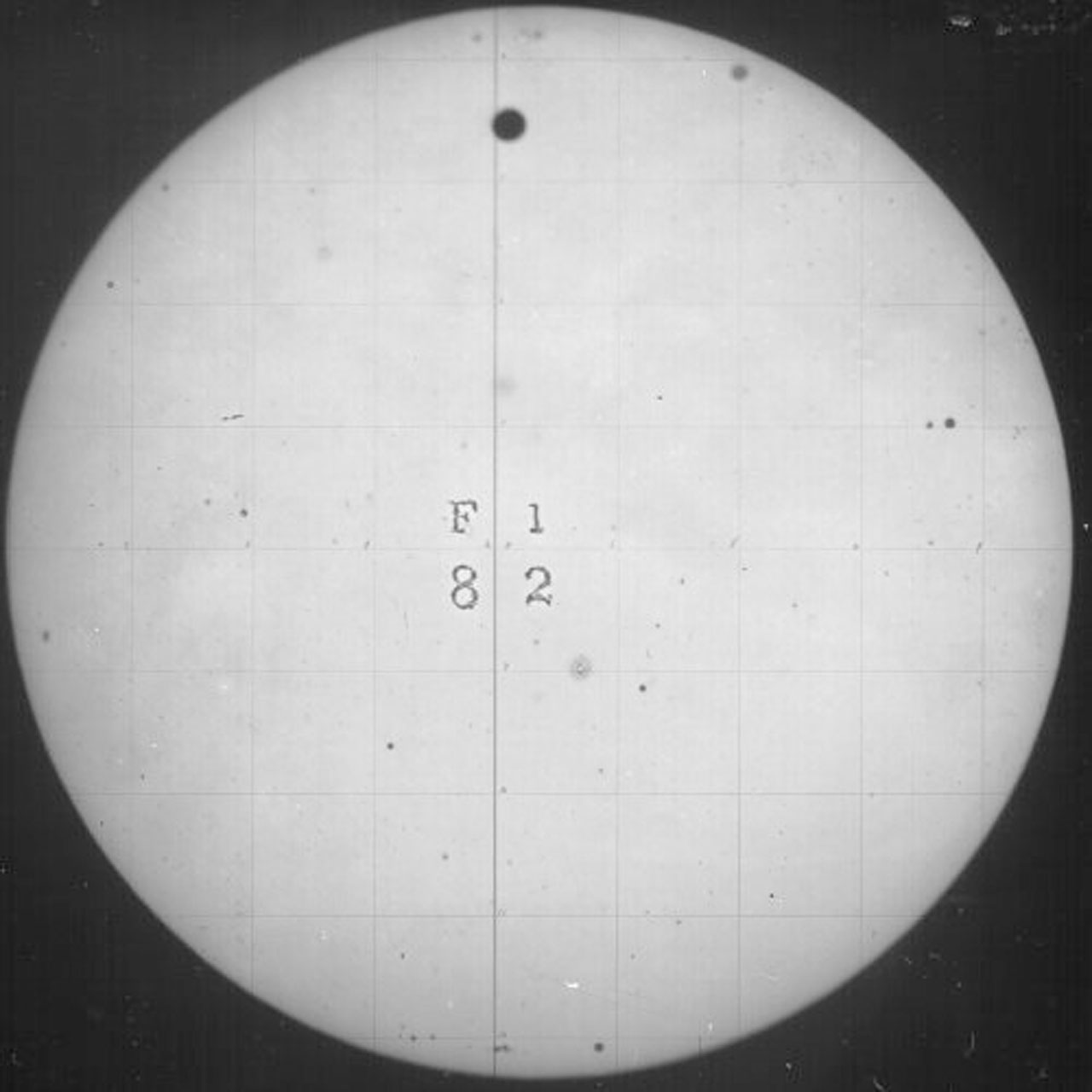
The Venus transit of 1882

The 1882 transit of Venus on 6 December 1882 (13:57 to 20:15 UTC), was the second and last transit of Venus of the 19th century, the first having taken place eight years earlier in 1874. Many expeditions were sent by European powers to describe both episodes, eight by the United States Congress alone.

Edward James Stone organized the British expeditions. Stephen Joseph Perry and Commander Pelham Aldrich, as captain of HMS Fawn, observed the transit from an improvised tent observatory in Madagascar.

Jean-Charles Houzeau invented in 1871 a heliometer with unequal focal lengths. For the observation of the transit he organized two expeditions: one to San Antonio, Texas, and another to Santiago de Chile. The two expeditions each had an identical copy of Houzeau's heliometer.

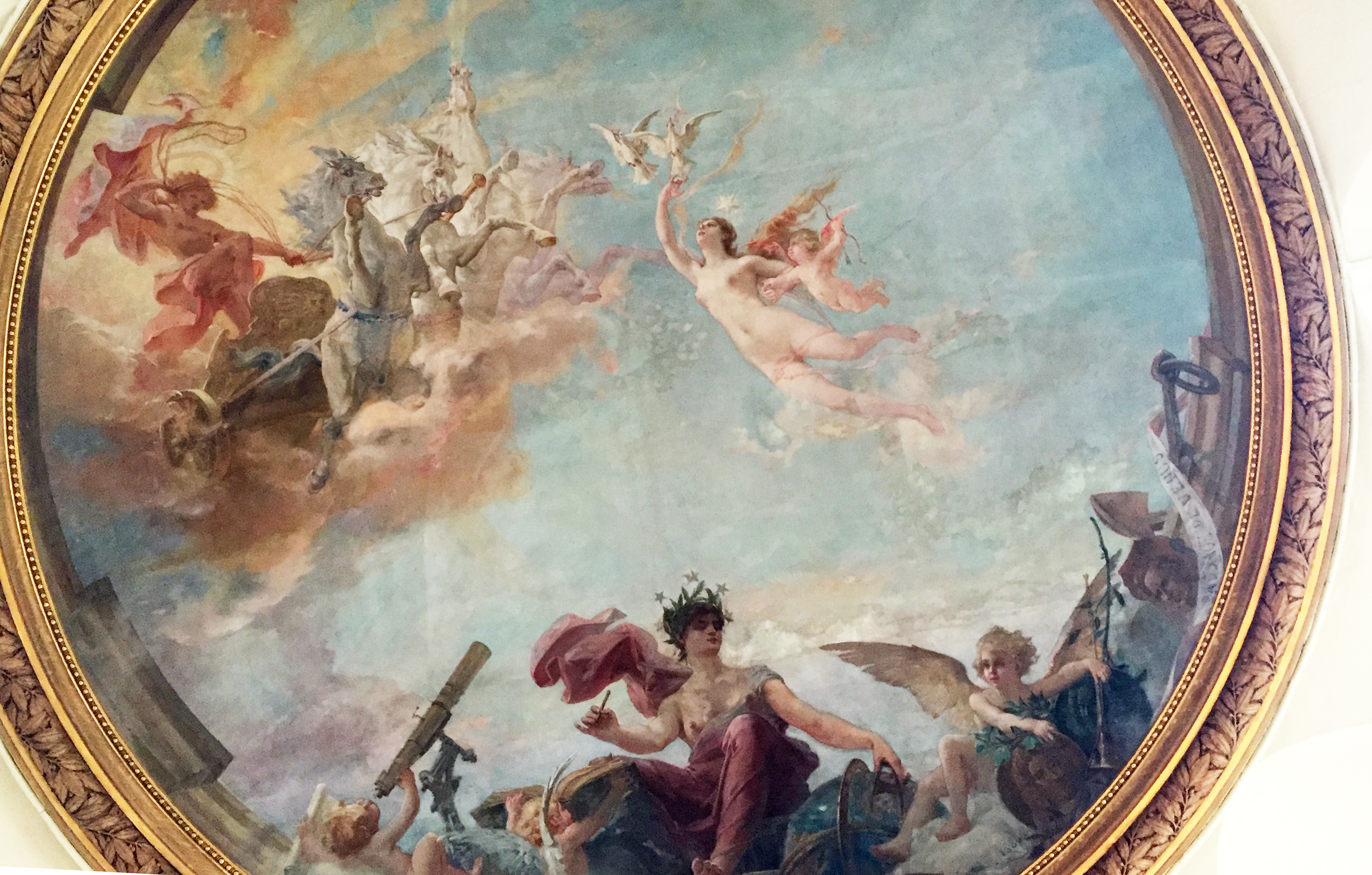
An illustration of the transit of Venus of 1882. Ceiling mural in the Paris Observatory.

The French Academy of Sciences organized ten expeditions to various locations, including Florida, Mexico, Haiti, Martinique, and Cape Horn. For observations of the transit by French expeditions, for the year 1883 the French Academy of Sciences awarded nine Lalande Prizes to scientists, including Jean Jacques Anatole Bouquet de La Grye (leader of expedition to Puebla, Mexico), Octave de Bernardières (leader of expedition to San Bernardo, Chile), and the naval officer Georges-Ernest Fleuriais (leader of expedition to the coast of the province Santa Cruz in Patagonia).

The transit was observed from the United Kingdom by Samuel Cooper in Charminster and Roger Langdon at Silverton, both in Devon, and by W F Denning in Bristol. In Ireland by R S Ball, W Doberck and J L E Dreyer also saw it.

The event was celebrated in music with the Transit of Venus March by John Philip Sousa.
