= 1639 transit of Venus =

Earliest certainly recorded transit of Venus

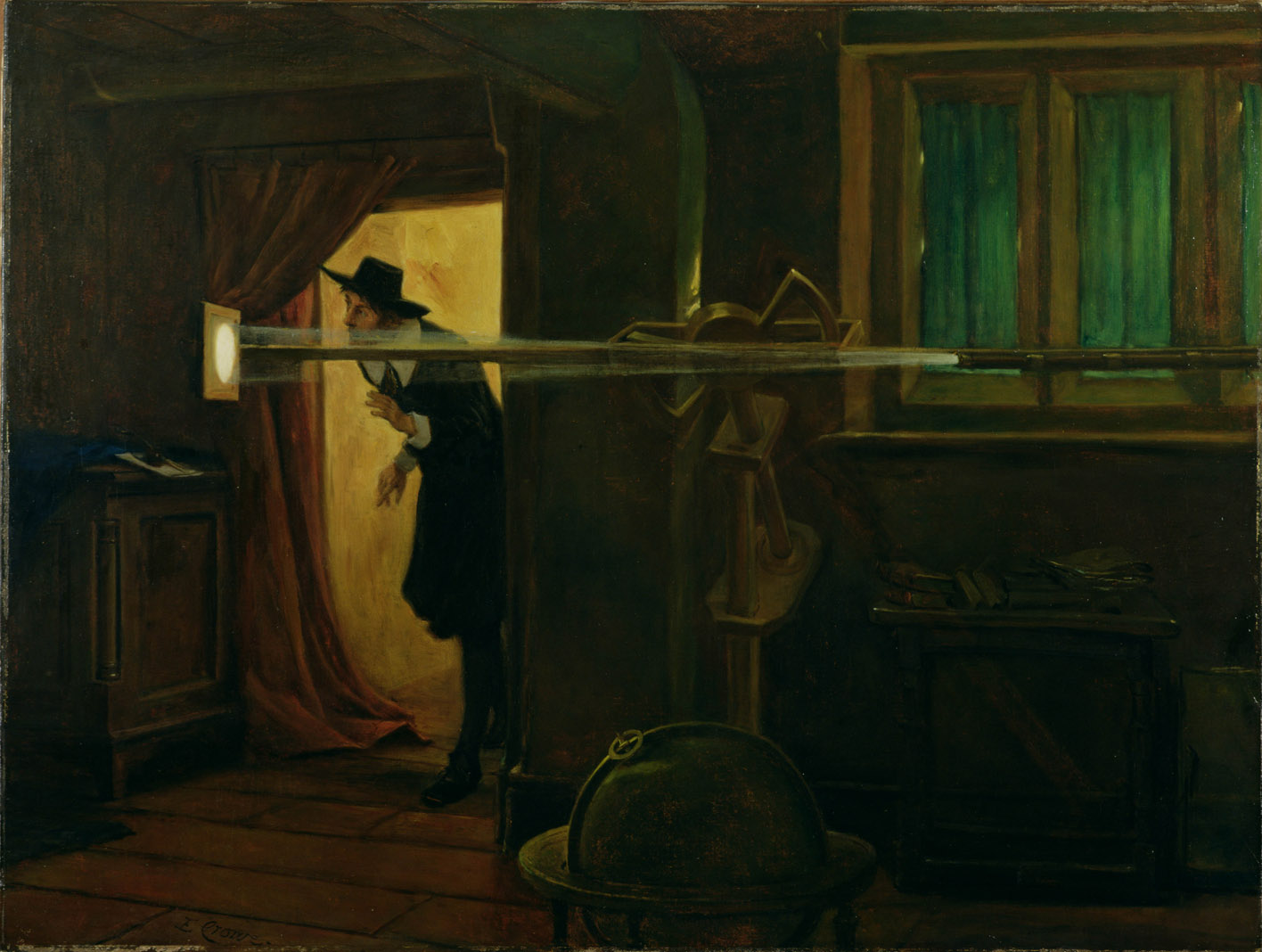
Romanticised Victorian painting of Jeremiah Horrocks observing the 1639 transit of Venus (The Founder of English Astronomy by Eyre Crowe, 1891)

The first known observations and recording of a transit of Venus were made in 1639 by the English astronomers Jeremiah Horrocks and his friend and correspondent William Crabtree. The pair made their observations independently on 4 December that year (24 November under the Julian calendar then used in England); Horrocks from Carr House, then in the village of Much Hoole, Lancashire, and Crabtree from his home in Broughton, near Manchester.

The friends, followers of the new astronomy of Johannes Kepler, were self-taught mathematical astronomers who had worked methodically to correct and improve Kepler's Rudolphine tables by observation and measurement. In 1639, Horrocks was the only astronomer to realise that a transit of Venus was imminent; others became aware of it only after the event when Horrocks's report of it was circulated. Although the friends both died within five years of making their observations, their ground-breaking work was influential in establishing the size of the Solar System; for this and their other achievements Horrocks and Crabtree, along with their correspondent William Gascoigne, are considered to be the founding fathers of British research astronomy.

== Background ==
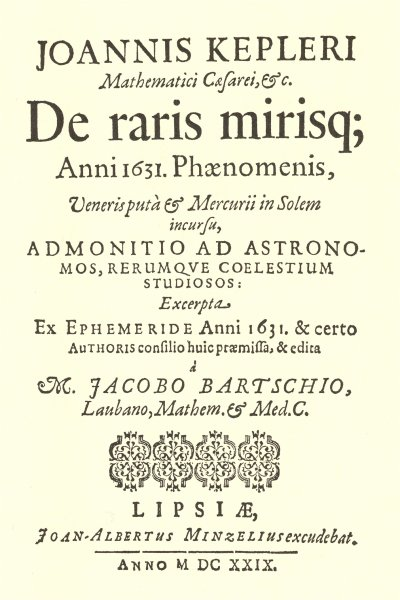
Kepler's De raris mirisque Anni 1631 Phaenomenis notice to astronomers of the impending transits of Mercury and Venus, 1631

By the 17th century, two developments allowed for the transits of planets across the face of the Sun to be predicted and observed: the telescope and the new astronomy of Johannes Kepler, which assumed elliptical, rather than circular, planetary orbits.

In 1627, Kepler published his Rudolphine Tables. Two years later he published extracts from the tables in his pamphlet De raris mirisque Anni 1631 Phaenomenis which included an admonitio ad astronomos (warning to astronomers) concerning a transit of Mercury in 1631 and transits of Venus in 1631 and 1761. The Mercury transit occurred as predicted and was observed by Johann Baptist Cysat in Innsbruck, Johannes Remus Quietanus in Rouffach and Pierre Gassendi in Paris, vindicating the Keplerian approach but their observations threw into question previous theories about the Solar System, as Mercury was shown to be much smaller than expected.

Although Kepler's calculations indicated that the 1631 transit of Venus would best be visible from the American continent, he was not fully confident of his prediction, and advised that European astronomers should be prepared to observe the event. Gassendi and others in Europe watched for it but, as predicted, the Sun was below the horizon during the transit. According to modern calculations, observers in much of Italy and along the eastern Mediterranean should have been able to view the last stage of the transit, but no such observations were recorded. Kepler had predicted a near miss for a Venus transit in 1639 (Note: This is the account given by most sources, but Kollerstrom (2004) says that the Rudolphine tables did predict the 1639 Venus transit, but that Kepler had only noticed the 1631 transit while preparing the ephemeris for that year and had not realised that the tables predicted a second transit for 1639.) and, as the next full transit was not expected for another 121 years, Gassendi and the other astronomers concentrated their efforts in other areas.

=== Jeremiah Horrocks ===
Jeremiah Horrocks (1618 – 3 January 1641) was born in Lower Lodge, Toxteth Park – now part of Liverpool but at that time a separate town. His father James was a watchmaker, and his mother Mary Aspinwall was from a notable Toxteth Park family. Several members of the Aspinwall family were also in the watchmaking trade, and it is said that a watchmaker uncle first interested Jeremiah in astronomy. Jeremiah joined Emmanuel College on 11 May 1632 and matriculated as a member of the University of Cambridge on 5 July 1632 as a sizar, which meant he did not have the means to fully support himself and was given specific duties to compensate for a reduction in fees. At Cambridge, he would have studied the arts, classical languages, a little geometry, and some traditional astronomy, but not the latest work by Galileo, Tycho Brahe and Kepler. He used his spare time to teach himself the more demanding mathematical astronomy and familiarise himself with the latest thinking. Horrocks read most of the astronomical treatises of his day, identified their weaknesses, and was suggesting new lines of research by the age of 17. In 1635, he left Cambridge without formally graduating, presumably owing to the cost of the graduation ceremony.

After leaving Cambridge, Horrocks returned to his home in Lancashire and began collecting books and instruments in order to pursue his main interest, the study of astronomy. In the summer of 1639, he left home and moved about 18 miles (29 km) along the coast to the village of Much Hoole. This was probably to become tutor to the children of the Stones family, prosperous haberdashers who lived at Carr House, within the Bank Hall Estate, Bretherton.

Horrocks was the first to demonstrate that the Moon moved in an elliptical path around the Earth. He also wrote a treatise on Keplerian astronomy and began to explore mathematically the properties of the force that became known as gravity. Decades later, Isaac Newton acknowledged Horrocks's work in relation to the Moon in Newton's Principia.

=== William Crabtree ===
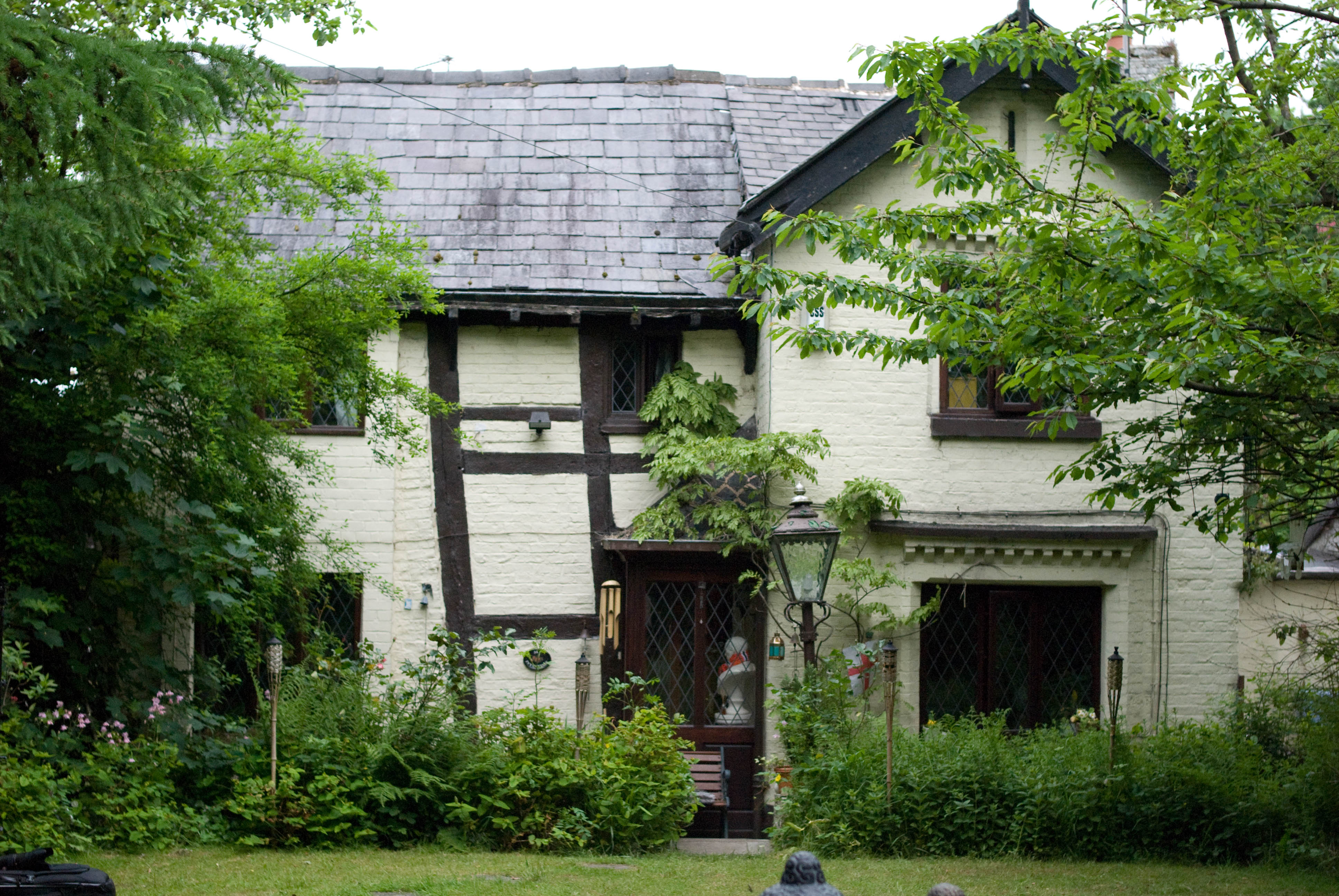
Ivy Cottage, Broughton: the house from which William Crabtree is thought to have made his observation of the transit

William Crabtree (1610–1644) was a cloth merchant from Broughton Spout, a hamlet in the township of Broughton near Manchester, which is now part of Salford. The son of John Crabtree, a Lancashire farmer of comfortable means, and Isabel Crabtree (née Pendleton), he was educated at Manchester Grammar School, which was then situated between the Collegiate Church and what is now Chetham's School of Music. He worked in Manchester, married into a wealthy family and in his spare time studied mathematics and astronomy. He carefully measured the movements of the planets, undertook precise astronomical calculations and rewrote the existing Rudolphine Tables with improved accuracy. He maintained an active correspondence, much of it now lost, with Horrocks, two other young astronomers – William Gascoigne and Christopher Towneley – and Samuel Foster, Professor of astronomy at Gresham College, London and alumnus of Emmanuel College. It is not known whether Horrocks and Crabtree ever met in person but from 1636 they corresponded regularly, and, because of their shared interest in the work of Johannes Kepler, referred to themselves, along with William Gascoigne, as nos Keplari (we Keplarians).

Crabtree's observations had convinced him that, despite their errors, Kepler's Rudolphine Tables were superior to the commonly used Lansberg's tables, and he became one of the first converts to Kepler's new astronomy. By 1637, he had convinced Horrocks of the superiority of the Keplerian system, and, using their own planetary observations, both men made many corrections to Kepler's tables, which Crabtree converted to decimal form.

=== Transit of Mercury ===
On 29 September 1638, Horrocks wrote to Crabtree about a likely forthcoming transit of Mercury on 21 October 1638 (Old Style) which Kepler had not predicted. He explained that he intended to construct what would later be called a helioscope by attaching his telescope to an "oblong stick, carrying a plane surface at right angles to itself on which to receive the Sun's image", and that he would draw a circle with numerical markings on a sheet of paper on which to project the image of the Sun. In the event, no such transit took place as Mercury passed over the Sun well outside the limit for a transit, but the exercise proved to be an important dry-run for the later observation of the transit of Venus.

In October 1639, Horrocks had calculated that transits of Venus occur not singly, but in pairs eight years apart, and realised that the second transit would occur in less than four weeks. He was convinced that a measurement could be made of the apparent diameter of the planet to within a fraction of a second of arc when it was seen as a dull black disk on the face of the Sun, compared to an accuracy of around one minute of arc when seen in its normal position as the bright morning star close to the Sun. He wrote to his younger brother and to Crabtree in Broughton, advising them to observe the event on Sunday, 24 November (4 December New Style). To quote Horrocks: "The more accurate calculations of Rudolphi very much confirmed my expectations; and I rejoiced exceedingly in the prospect of seeing Venus".

== Observation of the transit ==
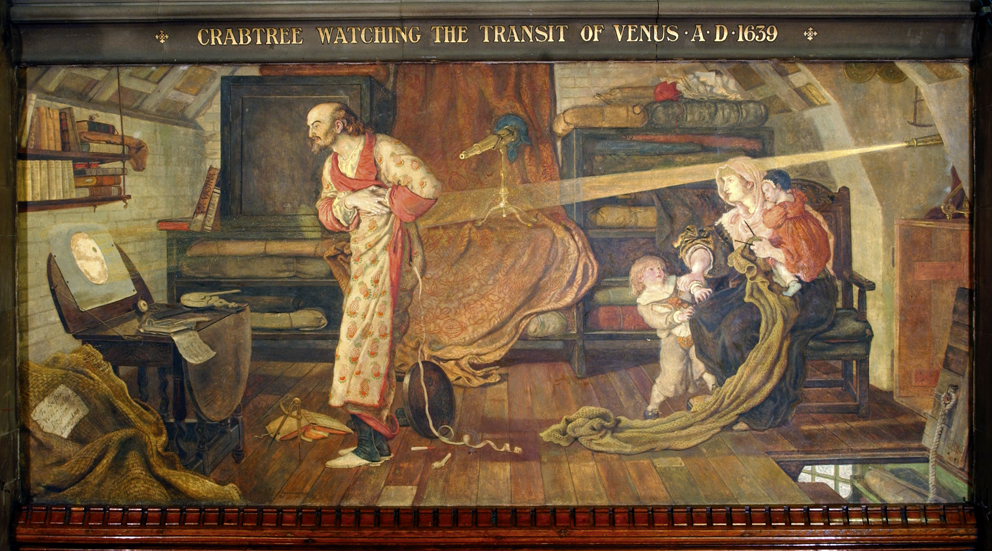
Crabtree watching the transit of Venus A.D. 1639 by Ford Madox Brown – one of the Manchester Murals. Crabtree is depicted as an old man although he was only 29 years old when he made the observation.

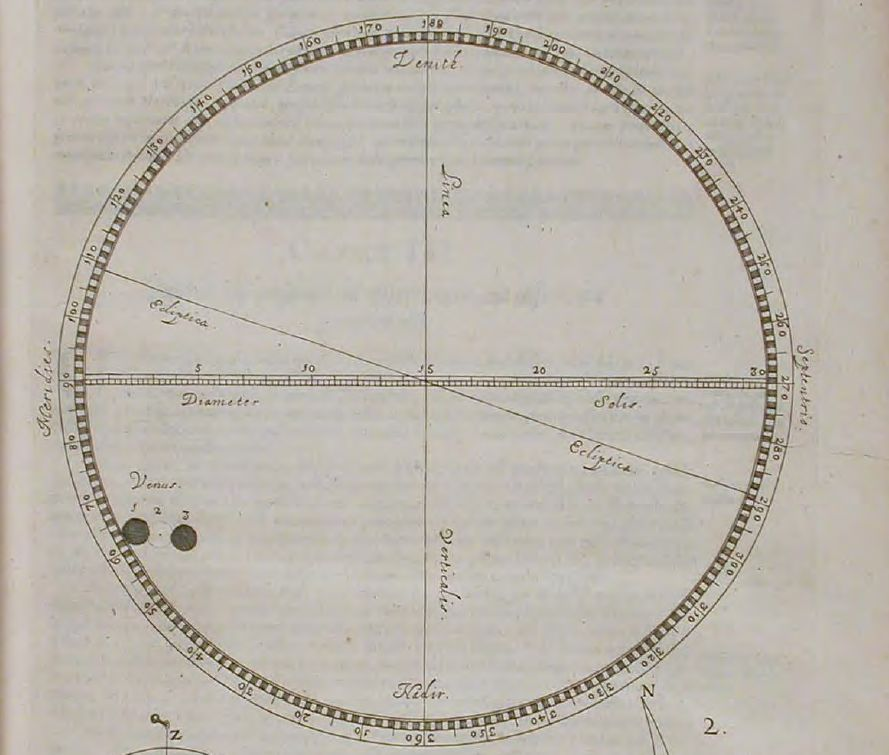
An image of the solar disk Hevelius added to his report, based on Horrocks's description of his observation. The image does not, however, give a true representation of what Horrocks would have seen. (Note: According to Van Roode (2012), Horrocks actually wrote "ad sinistram" (to the left) rather than "ad dextram", as does a letter from Nicolaus Mercator to Samuel Hartlib, quoting directly from Horrocks's own writing. Hevelius thought Horrocks was in error and changed it to "ad dextram". John Wallis also added the note "lege dextram" (read right) after "sinistram" in his Opera Posthuma of Horrocks. Van Roode assumes from this that both Hevelius and Wallis must have been confused about the orientation of the projected image from a Galileian telescope – which is inverted top to bottom, but not left to right. Also. the three disks of Venus are evenly spaced whereas the observations were made at intervals of 20 and 10 minutes. In A. B. Whatton's translation of "Venus in Sole Visa" Horrocks writes: I found that the shadow of Venus at the aforesaid hour, namely fifteen minutes past three, had entered the Sun's disk about 620 30', certainly between 600 and 650, from the top towards the right. This was the appearance in the dark apartment; therefore out of doors beneath the open sky, according to the laws of optics, the contrary would be the case, and Venus would be below the centre of the Sun, distant 620 30' from the lower limb, or the nadir, as the Arabians term it.)

Horrocks was concerned that the weather would be unfavourable for the transit as he believed the rare planetary conjunction would produce severe weather:

The chance of a clouded atmosphere caused me much anxiety; for Jupiter and Mercury were in conjunction with the Sun almost at the same time as Venus. This remarkable assemblage of the planets (as if they were desirous of beholding, in common with ourselves, the wonders of the heavens, and of adding to the splendour of the scene), seemed to forebode great severity of weather. Mercury, whose conjunction with the Sun is invariably attended with storm and tempest, was especially to be feared. In this apprehension I coincide with the opinion of the astrologers, because it is confirmed by experience; but in other respects I cannot help despising their more puerile vanities.

— Jeremiah Horrocks, "Venus in Sole Visa"

At around midday on 23 November Horrocks darkened his room and focused the rays of sunlight coming through the window onto the paper where the image could be observed safely. At his location in Much Hoole (the latitude of which he determined to be 53° 35'), he calculated that the transit should begin at about 3:00 P.M. on Sunday the 24th, but he began his observations the previous day fearing that he might miss the event if his calculations proved to be inaccurate. On the Sunday he began observing at sunrise, the weather was cloudy, but he first saw the tiny black shadow of Venus crossing the Sun at about 3:15 p.m., and observed for half an hour until sunset at 3:53 p.m.

When the time of the observation approached, I retired to my apartment, and having closed the windows against the light, I directed my telescope, previously adjusted to a focus, through the aperture towards the Sun and received his rays at right angles upon the paper ... I watched carefully on the 24th from sunrise to nine o'clock, and from a little before ten until noon, and at one in the afternoon, being called away in the intervals by business of the highest importance which, for these ornamental pursuits, I could not with propriety neglect ... About fifteen minutes past three in the afternoon, when I was again at liberty to continue my labours, the clouds, as if by divine interposition, were entirely dispersed ... I then beheld a most agreeable spectacle, the object of my sanguine wishes, a spot of unusual magnitude and of a perfectly circular shape, which had already fully entered upon the Sun's disk on the left ... Not doubting that this was really the shadow of the planet, I immediately applied myself sedulously to observe it ... although Venus continued on the disk for several hours, she was not visible to me longer than half-an-hour, on account of [the Sun] so quickly setting ... The inclination was the only point upon which I failed to attain the utmost precision; for, owing to the rapid motion of the Sun, it was difficult to observe with certainty to a single degree ... But all the rest is sufficiently accurate, and as exact as I could desire.

— Jeremiah Horrocks, "Venus in Sole Visa" (Note: For the full text of Horrocks's account of the observation see Jeremiah Horrox: "Venus in Sole Visa".)

Crabtree made his observations using a similar set-up but had insufficient time to make any measurements, as it was cloudy in Broughton, and thus he only saw the transit briefly. According to Horrocks: "Rapt in contemplation he stood for some time, scarcely trusting his own senses, through excess of joy ... In a little while, the clouds again obscured the face of the Sun, so that he could observe nothing more than that Venus was certainly on the disc at the time." Afterwards, he made "so rapid a sketch" of Venus as it had passed across the Sun's disc, allowing Crabtree to estimate the angular size of Venus to be 1′ 3″, accurate to within 1 second of arc of its actual size; Horrocks's estimate of 1′ 12″ was less accurate.

== Results ==
Kepler had found that the distance between the planets increased in proportion to their distance from the Sun, and this led him to assume that the universe was created with a divine harmony, and that the size of the planets would increase in the same way. He had written in 1618, "Nothing is more in concord with nature than that the order of magnitude should be the same as the order of the spheres". When Horrocks's measurements of Venus, coupled with some erroneous measurements by Kepler and Gassendi, seemed to confirm this, Horrocks tentatively (Note: Horrocks wrote in Venus in sole visa "I do not put forward this conjecture as a certain demonstration, but as a probability".) proposed a law which stated that all planets (with the exception of Mars) would be the same angular size when viewed from the Sun, this being 28 arc seconds. This meant that the assumption Kepler had made about the sizes of the planets held true, and led Horrocks to the false conclusion that the distance between each planet and the Sun was about 15,000 times its radius. Thus he estimated the average distance from the Earth to the Sun to be approximately 60 million miles (97 million km), suggesting that the Solar System was ten times larger than traditionally believed. His figure was much lower than the 93 million miles (150 million km) that the Astronomical Unit is known to be today, but, despite being based on a false premise, was more accurate than any suggested up to that time.

By 1640, the Yorkshire astronomer, William Gascoigne, had developed a reticle and a micrometer for his telescope, both of which would have been invaluable to Horrocks. Gascoigne showed them to Crabtree, who told Horrocks about them, and reported back to Gascoigne saying: "My friend Mr Horrox professeth, that little Touch I gave him, hath ravished his mind quite from itself, and left him in an Exstasie between Admiration and Amazement. I beseech you, Sir, slack not your Intentions for the Perfection of your begun Wonders."

Horrocks produced several drafts of a Latin treatise Venus in sole visa (Venus seen on the Sun) based on his observations, which he presumably intended to publish, but he died suddenly from unknown causes on 3 January 1641, aged 22.

== Legacy ==
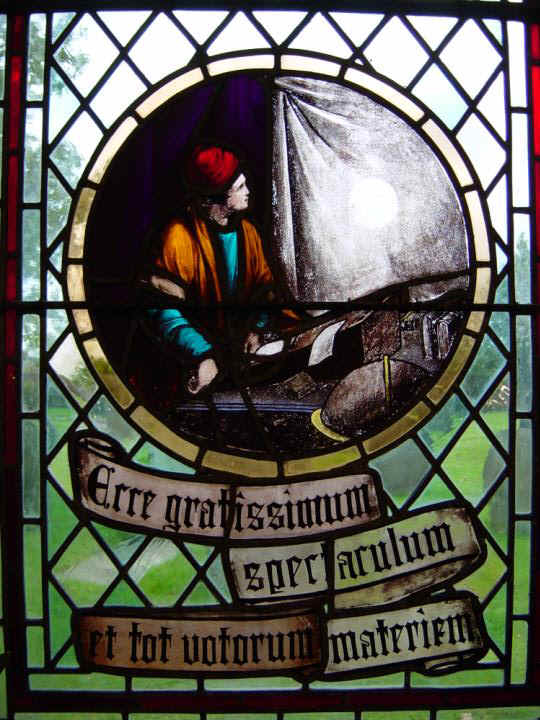
Memorial to Jeremiah Horrocks in St Michael's Church, Hoole. The Latin is taken from Horrocks's report of the 1639 transit and reads "Ecce gratissimum spectaculum et tot votorum materiem": "oh, most grateful spectacle, the realization of so many ardent desires".

Some of the drafts of Venus in Sole Visa were kept by Crabtree, who died in 1644, three years after Horrocks. Their other correspondent, William Gascoigne, died the same year in the Battle of Marston Moor. Horrocks's papers remained with his family for a short time; some were destroyed during the English Civil War, some were taken to Ireland by a brother, Jonas, and never seen again, and others passed into the collection of antiquarian and astronomer, Christopher Towneley, where they were consulted by Jeremy Shakerley, who wrote three books on astronomy in the mid-17th century. Others were destroyed in the Great Fire of London in 1666. The manuscripts were widely circulated from the late 1650s although they remained unpublished for many years.

The coronation of King Charles II took place on 23 April 1661 (3 May, New Style), the day of a Mercury transit across the Sun. Dutch astronomer Christiaan Huygens attended the coronation, during which he heard about the Horrocks's manuscript, found in 1659 by John Worthington (Master of Jesus College, Cambridge and alumnus of Emmanuel College, where he was a contemporary of Horrocks), together with some fragments of correspondence with Crabtree. Huygens knew the eminent Polish astronomer Johannes Hevelius, and gave him the manuscript copy; Hevelius appended the manuscript to his report on the Mercury transit, Mercurius in sole visus Gedani, published in 1662. The publication of Venus in Sole Visa by Hevelius caused great consternation at the newly founded Royal Society when it was realised that such an elegant and important paper by an Englishman had been neglected in his own country for so long. The mathematician John Wallis, who was a friend of Horrocks at Emmanuel College, and a founder member and leading light of the society, summed up the view of its members when he wrote:

I cannot help being displeased, that this valuable observation, purchasable with no money, elegantly described and prepared for the press, should have laid for two-and-twenty years, and that no-one should have been found to take charge of so fair an offspring at its father's death, to bring to light a treatise of such importance to astronomy and to preserve a work for our country's credit and for the advantage of mankind.

The Royal Society assumed responsibility for publication of most of the remainder of Horrocks's work as Jeremiae Horroccii Opera Posthuma in 1672–73.

The recording of the transit is seen by many as the birth of modern astronomy in Britain. John Flamsteed later said he regarded Horrocks, Crabtree and Gascoigne as the founding fathers of British research astronomy and the intellectual heirs to Galileo and Kepler. and began his three folio volume, Historia Coelestis Britannica (1745) by printing five pages of their letters and observations made between 1638 and 1643.

== Commemorations ==
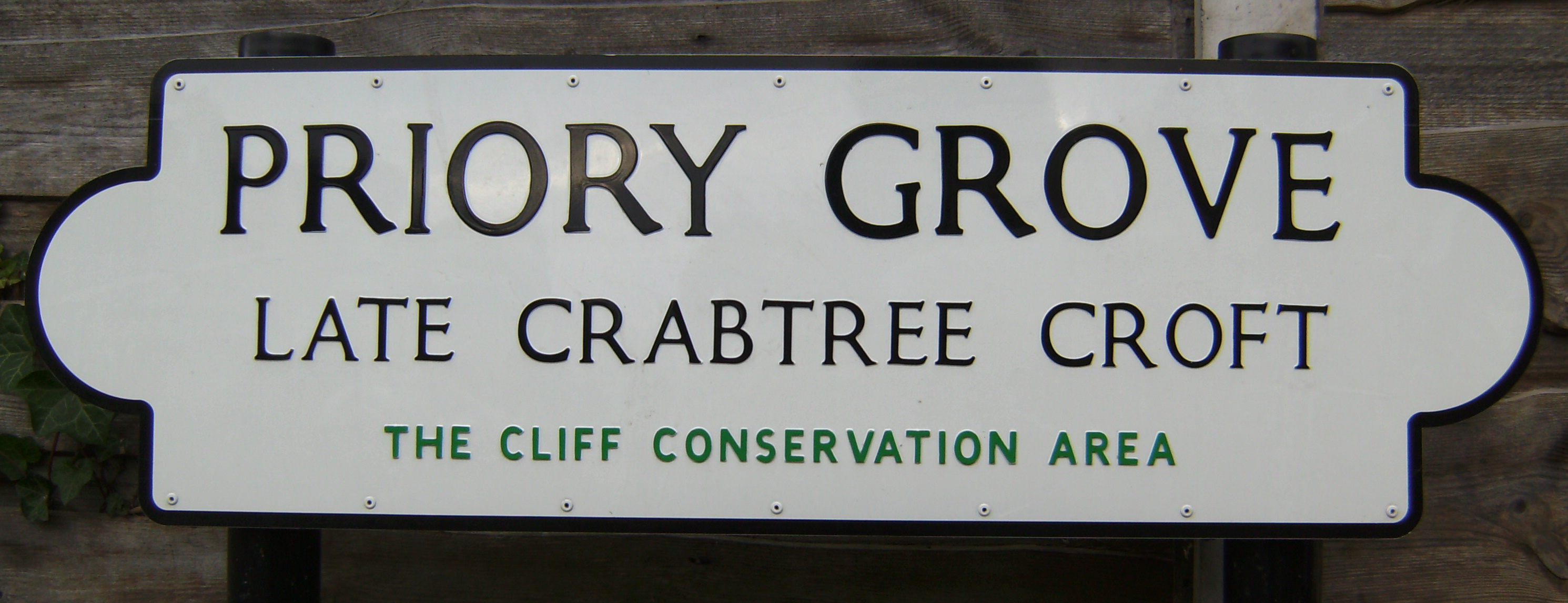

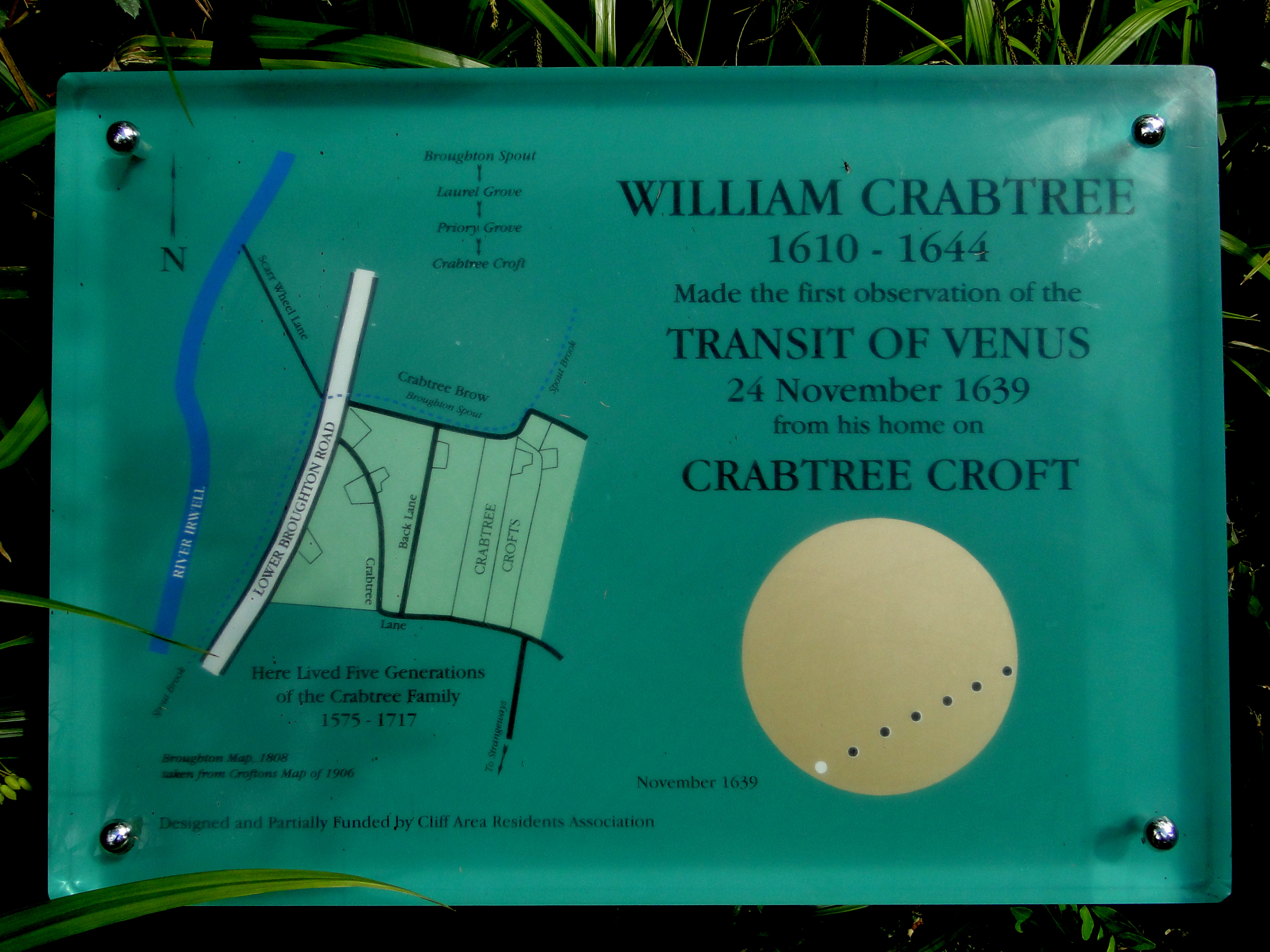
Plaque commemorating Crabtree's observation near his home in Broughton

During the 19th century there was a revival of interest in Horrocks's and Crabtree's achievement. Rev. A. B. Whatton, who translated Venus in sole visa from Latin, assumed that Horrocks's comment about "business of the highest importance which, for these ornamental pursuits, I could not with propriety neglect" must have referred to the duties of a curate, although it seems more probable they were his duties as tutor at the house, or perhaps his "business" was merely to attend the church. The notion of the impoverished curate gained popular traction and in 1874, after much lobbying, a memorial was mounted in Westminster Abbey opposite to that of Isaac Newton which reads:

In memory of Jeremiah Horrocks, Curate of Hoole in Lancashire who died on 3rd of Jan, 1641 in or near his 22nd year.

Having in so short a life detected the long inequality in the mean motion of Jupiter and Saturn discovered the orbit of the moon to be an ellipse determined the motion of the lunar apse suggested the physical cause of its revolution and of Venus which was seen by himself and his friend William Crabtree on Sunday the 24th of November (O.S.) 1639. This tablet facing the monument of Newton was raised after the lapse of more than two centuries. Dec. 9, 1874.

The Rev. Robert Brickel, Rector of St. Michael's Church, Hoole from 1848 to 1881, raised money by public subscription in Lancashire, Oxford and Cambridge to fund the creation of a new chancel and sanctuary to the church to be named "The Horrocks Chapel". The chancel was completed by 1824, and the sanctuary by 1858. The vestry was extended in 1998–1999, and the first window in the north wall, originally installed in 1872, has stained glass roundels commemorating the transits of Venus of 1874 and 2004. There is also a marble tablet commemorating Horrocks. The church clock, contributed by the parishioners as their commemoration of Horrocks, was installed in 1859; the sundial, installed in 1875, has a quotation from Horrocks ("Sine Sole Sileo") that translates as "Without the sun I am silent".

In 1903 the artist Ford Madox Brown was commissioned to produce the murals known as The Manchester Murals for Manchester Town Hall. The painting entitled Crabtree watching the transit of Venus AD 1639 is a romanticised depiction of Crabtree's observation of the event.

Thy return posterity shall witness; years must roll away, but then at length the splendid sight again shall greet our distant children's eyes. Jeremiah Horrocks

On 9 June 2004, the day after the first of a 21st-century pair of Venus transits occurred as predicted by Horrocks, a commemorative street nameplate in memory of William Crabtree was unveiled at the junction of Lower Broughton Road and Priory Grove, which marks the northern boundary of Crabtree Croft. In December 2005, a commemorative plaque was unveiled a few yards away near Ivy Cottage on Lower Broughton Road, which is thought to have been the home of Crabtree and his family at the time he was collaborating with Horrocks. The second transit of the pair occurred on 5 and 6 June 2012, and was marked by a celebration held in the church at Much Hoole, which was streamed live worldwide on the NASA website. A celebration was also held at Crabtree's former home in Broughton when NASA broadcast a re-creation of the observation at Ivy Cottage, inspired by the Ford Madox Brown mural, to millions of viewers, and projected a live video stream of the transit from Hawaii onto the side of the house.
