= Christopher Towneley =

English antiquarian

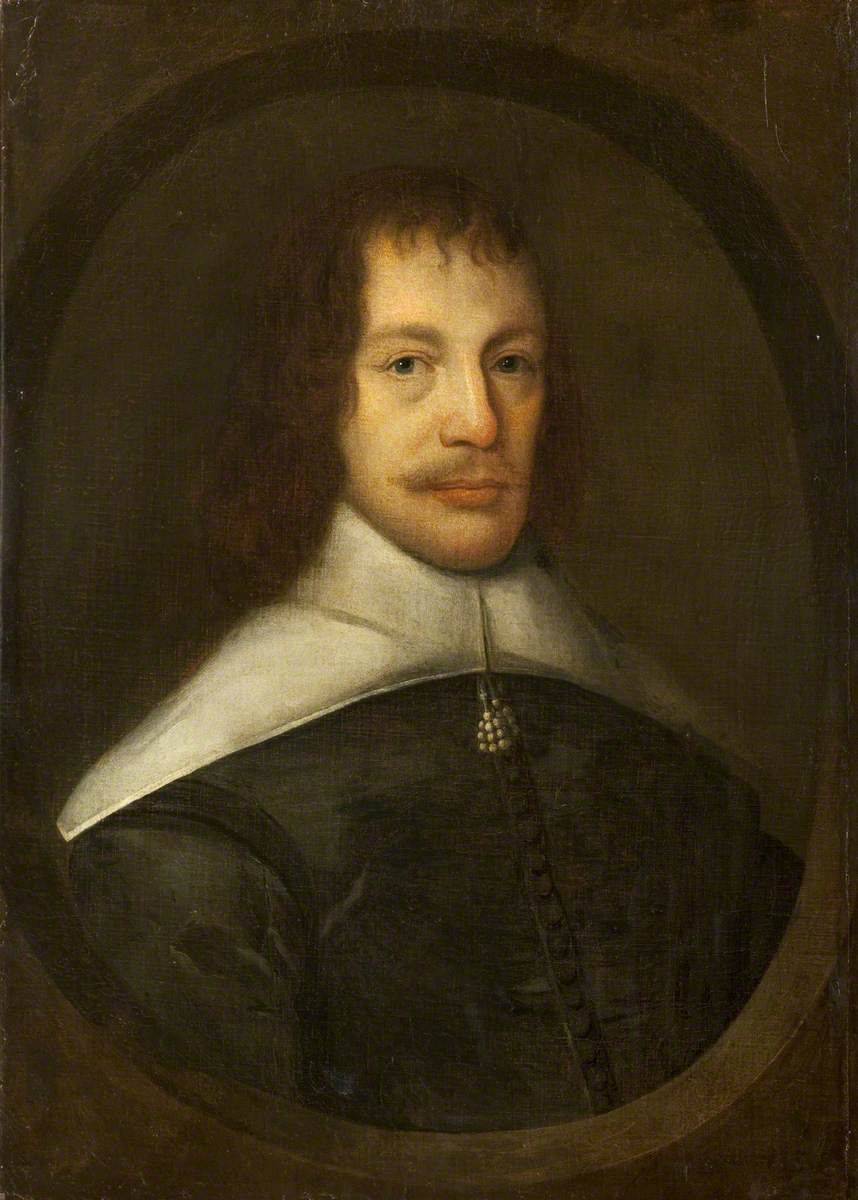
- Born: 9 January 1604; Towneley Hall, Lancashire
- Died: August 1674 (aged 70)
- Occupation: Antiquarian

Christopher Towneley (9 January 1604 – August 1674) was an English antiquarian from an old Roman Catholic, Lancashire family. Often called ‘the Transcriber’, he spent much of his life researching local history and copying ancient documents.

== Early life ==
Towneley was a younger son of Richard Towneley and Jane Ashton of Towneley Hall, Burnley, Lancashire, and was born there on 9 January 1604. His father died in 1628 and the Towneley Estate passed to Christopher's eldest brother, also called Richard. However this Richard also died, childless, in 1635. Another older brother, Charles, inherited, but he was killed during the Civil War, leading a small regiment for the Royalists at the Battle of Marston Moor in 1644. The Towneley Estate was confiscated by the Parliamentary sequestrators, but was recovered by Charles' son Richard by 1653, on payment of a large fine.

== Career ==
Towneley trained as an attorney, but probably did not long follow his profession (there was only a brief period when the recusancy laws did not prevent this), the greater part of his life being occupied in scientific and antiquarian pursuits.

Among his friends and correspondents were Jeremiah Horrox, William Crabtree, William Gascoigne, Sir Jonas Moore, Jeremiah Shakerley, and John Flamsteed, astronomers and mathematicians; Roger Dodsworth, Sir William Dugdale, and John Hopkinson, antiquaries, and Sir Edward Sherburne, poet. In conjunction with Dr. Richard Kuerden, he projected, but never finished, a history of Lancashire. Many years were spent by him in transcribing ‘in a fair but singular hand’ public records, chartularies, and other evidences relating chiefly to Lancashire and Yorkshire. These transcripts were drawn upon by friends during his lifetime, and have since proved a valuable storehouse of materials for county historians and genealogists. The best description of them is given in the fourth report of the historical manuscripts commission (1874, pp. 406, 613). The collections, after remaining at Towneley for over two centuries, were dispersed by auction at Sotheby's on 18–28 June 1883.

== Personal life ==
As a young man he had lived at Hapton Tower, near Burnley. In 1640, he married Alice, daughter of John Braddyll of Portfield, near Whalley. Alice was the widow of Richard Towneley of Carr Hall, Barrowford, a distant relative of Christopher. On his marriage he moved to Carr Hall, where the couple lived until Alice's death in 1657. Towneley then changed his residence to Moor Isles in Pendle Forest.

He died in August 1674, and was buried at Burnley. In the inventory of his goods, taken after his death, his manuscripts, the labour of a lifetime, were valued at only 11 shillings (the equivalent of approximately £100 as of 2023 (Note: UK Retail Price Index inflation figures are based on data from Clark, Gregory (2017). "The Annual RPI and Average Earnings for Britain, 1209 to Present (New Series)". MeasuringWorth.)).
