= Shakerley (disambiguation) =

Shakerley could refer to:

- Shakerley, English town

People:

- Lady Elizabeth Shakerley (1941–2020), British socialite
- Sir Geoffrey Shakerley (1932–2012), English aristocrat
- Jeremy Shakerley (1626–1653?), English astronomer
