= Jeremy Shakerley =

English astronomer

Jeremy [Jeremiah] Shakerley (November 1626 – c. 1653) was an English astronomer who came from astrological traditions and followed an observational approach which led him to critique several works of his time.

Shakerly was born in Halifax, Yorkshire to William Shakerley and Judith Brig (Briggs/Brigge). He was educated at a free school and then studied in Ireland before returning due to the unrest there. He concentrated on studies in mathematics from 1647 and began to correspond with the astrologer William Lilly. He believed that astrology could be improved by astronomical practice and sought to predict eclipses. He worked under John Stephenson and made calculations based on Kepler's tables. For a while he lived under the patronage of Christopher Towneley at Carr Hall. In 1649 he began to critique the work of Vincent Wing which he published as The anatomy of Urania practica: … laying open the errors and impertinencies delivered … by Mr Vincent Wing, and Mr William Leybourne, under the title of Urania practica (1649). He had examined the work of Jeremy Horrocks and found better explanation of the dynamics of the moon. Shakerley's predictions were published by Robert and William Leybourne as Tabulae Britannicae: the British Tables (1653). He travelled to India to make observations on a transit of Mercury predicted to occur in 1651. While in India, he calculated the latitude of Surat as "21 degrees and betwixt 10' and 15' North" writing to Henry Osborne in London. He observed that Indian astrologers were able to make predictions of lunar eclipses with little error and sought to examine their methods. Nothing further was heard of him and it is thought that he died in India.
