= Theodora Lisle Prankerd =

British botanist

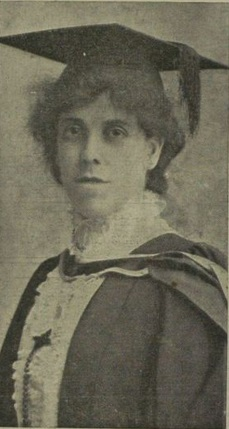
- Prankerd, 1919
- Born: 21 June 1878; Hackney, London, England
- Died: 11 November 1939 (aged 61); Reading, England
- Occupation: Botanist

Theodora Lisle Prankerd (21 June 1878 – 11 November 1939) was a British botanist who worked on the growth of ferns, and lectured at Bedford College and the University of Reading.

== Early life and education ==
Theodora Lisle Prankerd was born in Hackney, London, the daughter of general practitioner Orlando Reeves Prankerd and his second wife, Clementina Soares. She attended Brighton High School (now Brighton Girls). She then studied botany Royal Holloway, University of London, first supported by a Founders scholarship, and then a Driver Scholarship, graduating with 1st Class Honours in 1903, at the time headed by Margaret Jane Benson.

== Work and achievements ==
Prankerd worked as a school teacher from 1904 to 1911. She was appointed a part time lecturer in botany at Bedford College in 1912, before becoming a full time lecturer there until 1917. In 1912 she became a part-time Reader in Botany at Birkbeck College, London. In 1917 Plankerd was appointed a lecturer in botany at the University of Reading, where she lectured until her death. Colleagues included Tom Harris and Walter Styles, who wrote her obituary. She gained her Doctor of Sciences degree from the University of London in 1929. Between 1922 and 1936 she published a series of pioneering studies in the growth of ferns in response to gravity (geotropism). Although she was credited with all the research and authorship of the published papers, her work was presented at various scientific meetings by male colleagues.

Prankerd died in Reading in 1939 after being hit by a bus, and her mother endowed a research scholarship in her name to the University of Reading.

== Publications ==
- Prankerd, T. L. (1911), On the Structure and Biology of the Genus Hottonia. Annals of Botany os-25 (1): 253–268.view extract on publisher's website
- Prankerd, T. L. (1912), On the Structure of the Palæozoic Seed Lagenostoma ovoides, Will. Journal of the Linnean Society of London, Botany, 40: 461–490. doi:10.1111/j.1095-8339.1912.tb00880.x view extract
- Prankerd, T. L. (1915), Notes on the Occurrence of Multinucleate Cells. Annals of Botany os-29 (4): 599–604. view extract on publisher's website
- PRANKERD, T. L., Preliminary observations on the nature and distribution of the statolith apparatus in plants. Rep. Brit. Ass., Manchester Meeting, 1915, p. 722, Publ. London, 1916
- Prankerd, T. L. (1920), Statocytes of the Wheat Haulm. Botanical Gazette 70(2): 148-152 view on JSTOR
- Prankerd, T. L. (1922), On the Irritability of the Fronds of Asplenium bulbiferum, With Special Reference to Graviperception. Proc. R. Soc. Lond. B 93(650): 143–152; doi:10.1098/rspb.1922.0010 view full text
- Prankerd, T. L. (1925), The Ontogeny of Graviperception in Osmunda regalis. Annals of Botany os-39 (4): 709–720. view extract on publisher's website
- Prankerd, T. L. (1929), Studies in the Geotropism of Pteridophyta. IV. On Specificity in Graviperception. Journal of the Linnean Society of London, Botany, 48: 317–336. doi:10.1111/j.1095-8339.1929.tb00590.x view abstract
- Prankerd, T. L. (1935), Studies in the Geotropism of the Pteridophyta. V. Some Effects of Temperature on Growth and Geotropism in Asplenium bulbiferium. Proc. R. Soc. Lond. B 116(800): 479-493 doi:10.1098/rspb.1935.0004 view full text
- Prankerd, T. L. (1936), Studies in the Geotropism of Pteridophyta. VI. On Rhythm in Graviperception and Reaction to Gravity. Proc. R. Soc. Lond. B 120(817): 126-141 view full text

== Bibliography ==
- Strohmeier R. Lexikon der Naturwissenschaftlerinnen und naturkundigen Frauen Europas von der Antike bis zum 20. Jahrhundert. Frankfurt: Verlag Harri Deutsch, 1998. ISBN 978-3-8171-1567-9 page 226. Read on Google Books
