= William Crabtree =

English astronomer, mathematician, and merchant (1610–1644)

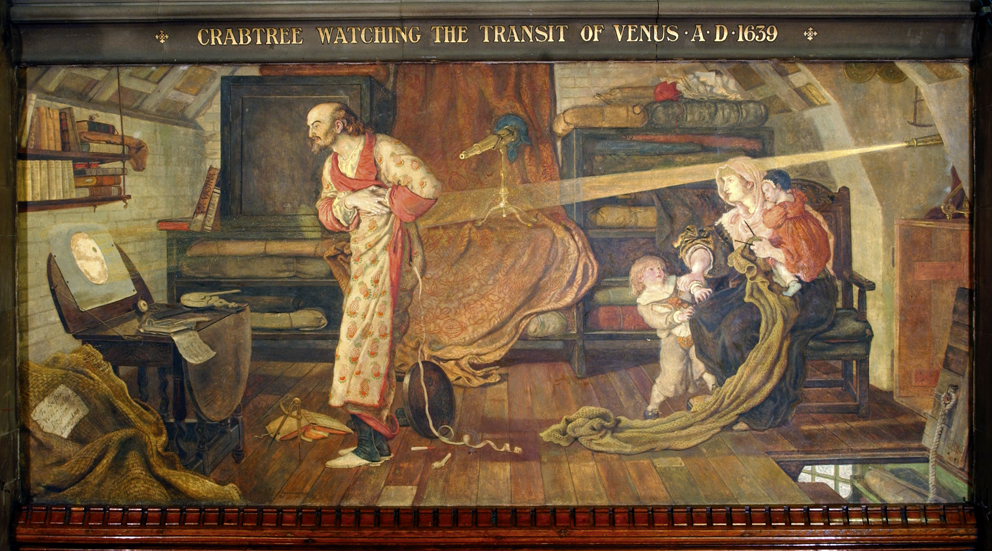
- William Crabtree, as he appears in The Manchester Murals in Manchester Town Hall
- Born: 1610; Broughton Spout, Broughton, Lancashire, England
- Died: 1644 (aged 34); Manchester, Lancashire, England
- Known for: Transit of Venus
- Scientific career
- Fields: Astronomy; Mathematics

William Crabtree (1610 – 1644) was an English astronomer, mathematician, and merchant from Broughton, then in the Hundred of Salford, Lancashire, England. He was one of only two people to observe and record the first predicted transit of Venus in 1639.

== Life and work ==
Crabtree was born in 1610 in the hamlet of Broughton Spout, which was on the east bank of the River Irwell, near the area now known as "The Priory" in Broughton, Salford and was educated at the Manchester Grammar School. He married into a wealthy family and worked as a merchant in Manchester. In his spare time, his great interest was astronomy. He carefully measured the movements of the planets and undertook precise astronomical calculations. With improved accuracy, he rewrote the existing Rudolphine Tables of Planetary Positions.

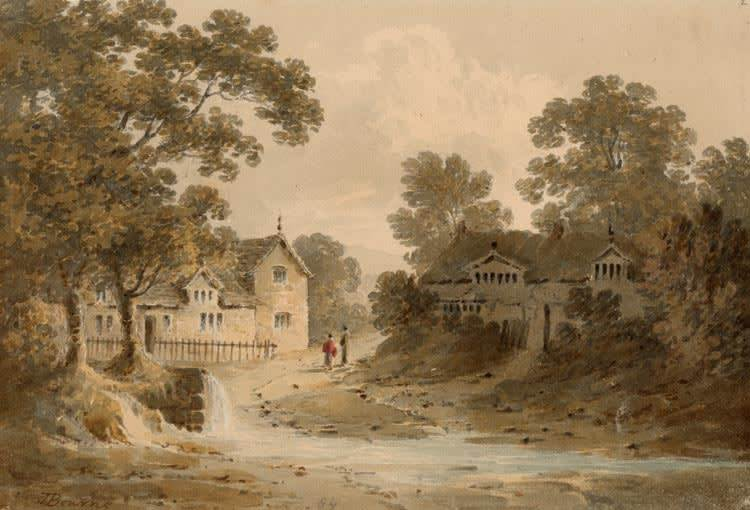
Broughton Spout by James Bourne (1773-1854) Crabtree's house is on the left of the painting.

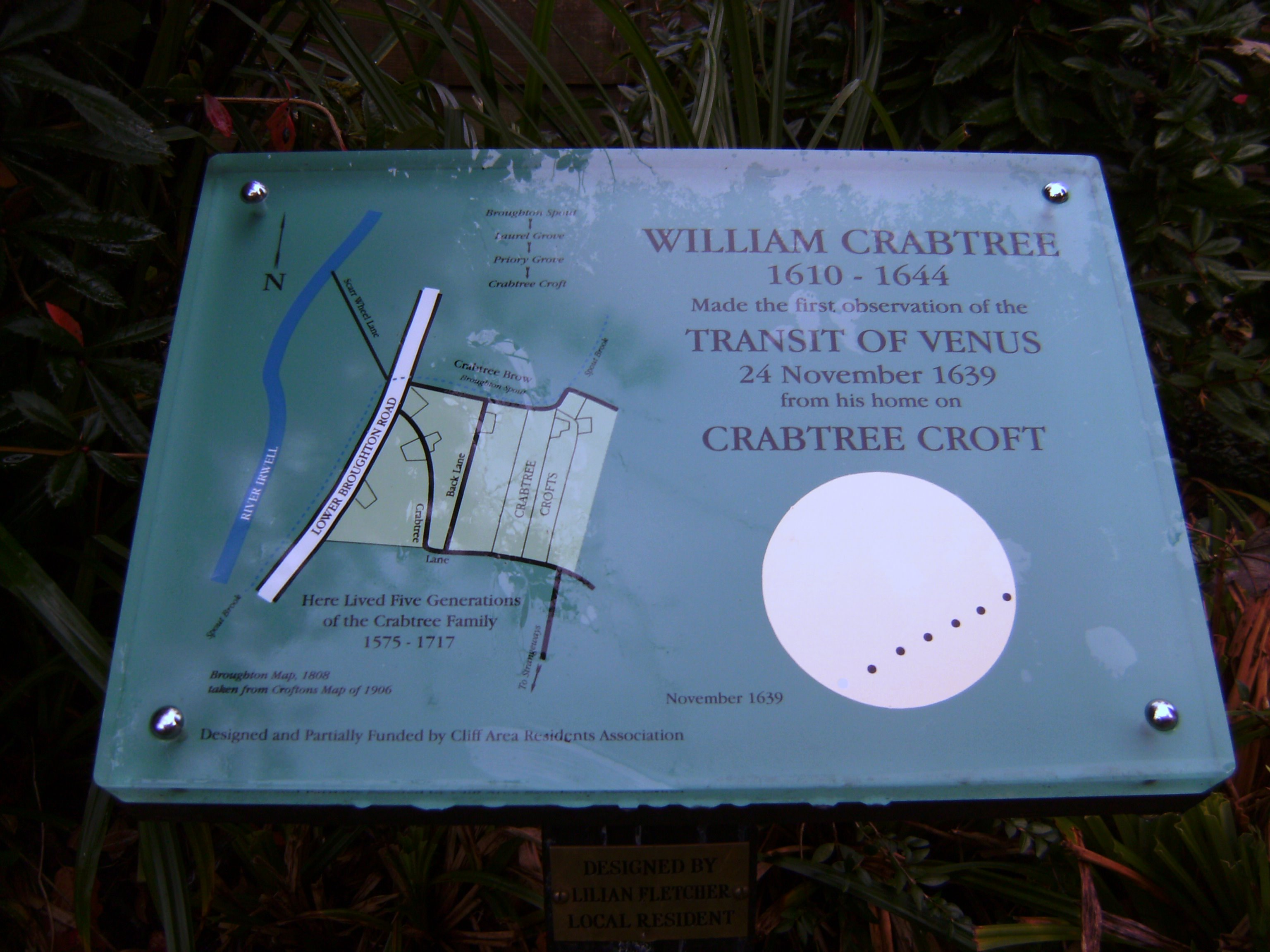
Plaque commemorating Crabtree's observation of the Transit of Venus

Crabtree corresponded with Jeremiah Horrocks, another enthusiastic amateur astronomer, from 1636. A group of astronomers from the north of England, which included William Gascoigne, formed around them and were Britain's first followers of the astronomy of Johannes Kepler. "Nos Keplari" as the group called themselves, were distinguished as being the first people to gain a realistic notion of the size of the Solar System. Crabtree and Horrocks were the only astronomers to observe, plot, and record the transit of Venus across the Sun, as predicted by Horrocks, on 24 November 1639 Julian calendar (4 December Gregorian calendar). The two correspondents both recorded the event in their own homes and it is not known whether they ever met in person, but Crabtree's calculations were crucial in allowing Horrocks to estimate the size of Venus and the distance from the Earth to the Sun. Unfortunately, Horrocks died early in 1641 – the day before he was due to meet Crabtree. Crabtree made his will on 19 July 1644, and was buried within the precincts of the Manchester Collegiate Church on 1 August 1644, close to where he had received his education.

The recording of the transit is now seen by many as the birth of modern astronomy in Britain, and indeed, John Flamsteed later said that the work of Horrocks and his north country colleagues laid much of the foundation upon which his work as Astronomer Royal would stand.

== Commemorations ==
Crabtree is celebrated in one of the Manchester Murals in the Great Hall of Manchester Town Hall, where a romanticised depiction of his recording of the transit can be seen (pictured) entitled Crabtree watching the transit of Venus AD 1639 painted by the artist Ford Madox Brown in 1881.

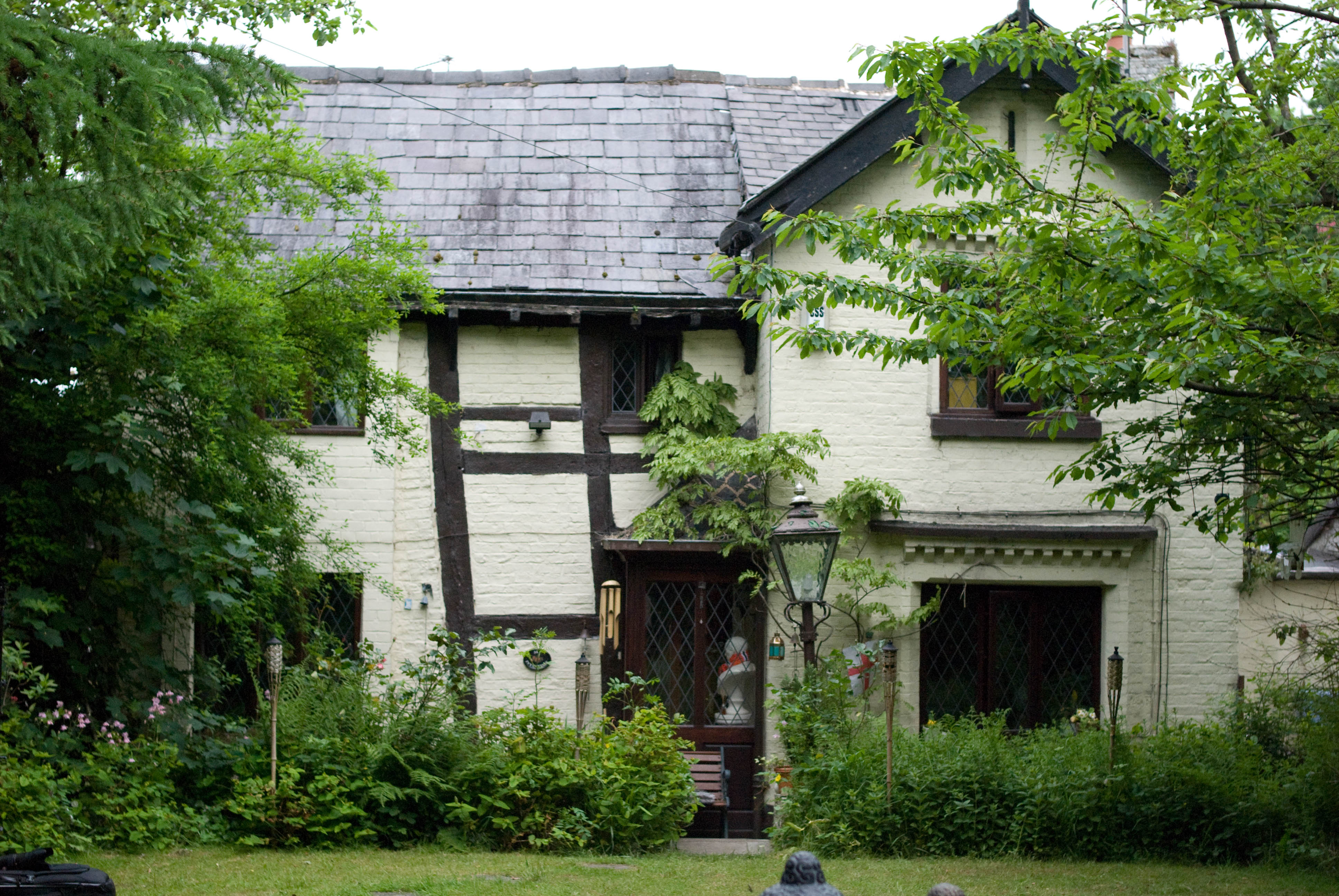
The house thought to be Crabtree's home at the time of the observation of the transit

On 9 June 2004, the day after a transit occurred as predicted by Horrocks, a commemorative street nameplate in memory of William Crabtree was unveiled at the junction of Lower Broughton Road and Priory Grove which marks the northern boundary of Crabtree Croft. A commemorative plaque was unveiled a few yards away in December 2005, at Ivy Cottage 388-90 Lower Broughton Road, which is thought most likely to have been the home of Crabtree and his family at the time when he was collaborating with Horrocks.

The second transit of the pair occurred on 5 and 6 June 2012 and a celebration was held at Ivy cottage, when NASA broadcast a recreation of the observation, inspired by the Ford Madox Brown mural, to millions of viewers and projected a live stream of the transit from Hawaii on the side of the house.

Minor planet 4137 Crabtree is named after him.
