= William Gascoigne (scientist) =

17th-century English astronomer, mathematician, and scientist

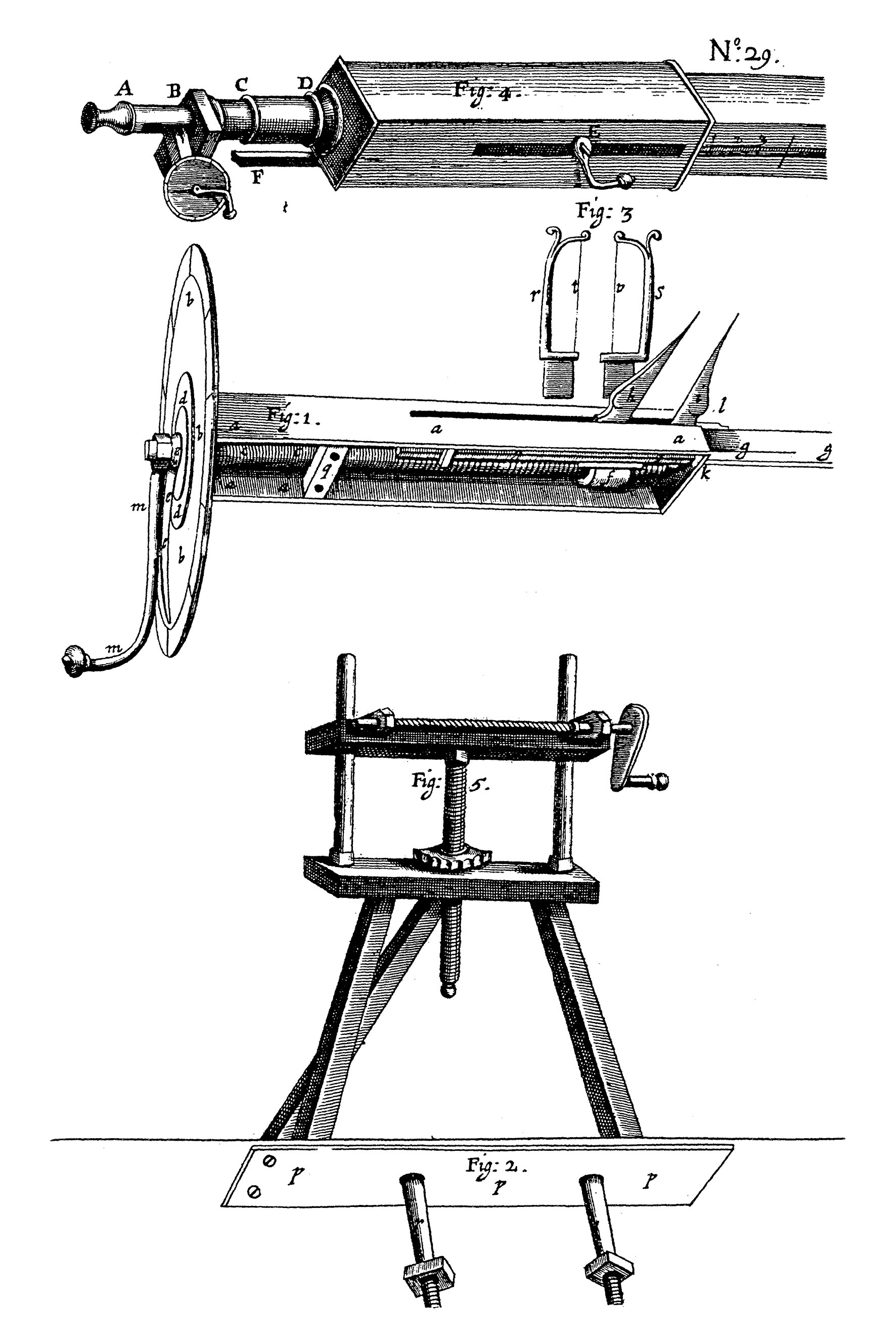
Gascoigne's Micrometer as drawn by Robert Hooke

William Gascoigne (1612 – 2 July 1644) was an English astronomer, mathematician and maker of scientific instruments from Middleton, Leeds who invented the micrometer and the telescopic sight. He was one of a group of astronomers in the north of England who followed the astronomy of Johannes Kepler, which included Jeremiah Horrocks and William Crabtree.

== Life and work ==
Gascoigne was born in Middleton, Leeds in 1612, the son of a minor country gentleman. His father was Henry Gascoigne, Esq., of Thorpe-on-the-Hill in the parish of Rothwell, near Leeds, Yorkshire. His mother was Margaret Jane, daughter of William Cartwright. Little is known of his early life. He claimed he was educated at the University of Oxford, although no record of this has been found.

In the late 1630s, Gascoigne, was working on a Keplerian optical arrangement when a thread from a spider's web happened to become caught at exactly the combined optical focal points of the two lenses. When he looked through the arrangement Gascoigne saw the web bright and sharp within the field of view. He realized that he could more accurately point the telescope using the line as a guide, and went on to invent the telescopic sight by placing crossed wires at the focal point to define the centre of the field of view. He then added this arrangement to a sextant modelled on the instrument used by Tycho Brahe, although Tycho's sextant was only a naked-eye instrument. Gascoigne's sextant was five feet in radius, and measured the distance between astronomical bodies to an unprecedented degree of accuracy. Gascoigne then realised that by introducing two points, whose separation could be adjusted using a screw, he could measure the size of the image enclosed by them. Using the known pitch of the screw, and knowing the focal length of the lens producing the image, he could work out the size of the object, such as the Moon or the planets, to a hitherto unattainable degree of accuracy.

Gascoigne met the Lancashire astronomer William Crabtree, probably in 1640. After making observations at Gascoigne's home, Crabtree was much taken with these inventions and immediately saw their significance. On his return to his home in Broughton, just outside Manchester, he wrote to Gascoigne asking if he might obtain such instruments and also wrote to his friend Jeremiah Horrocks about them. He wrote again to Gascoigne on 28 December 1640 saying,

My friend Mr. Horrox professeth that little touch which I gave him hath ravished his mind quite from itself and left him in an Exstasie between Admiration and Amazement. I beseech you Sir, slack not your Intentions for the Perfection of your begun Wonders.

Sadly, Horrocks died before he could try out the instruments, but Crabtree and Gascoigne did use them to try to corroborate Horrocks's theories about the elliptical orbit of the Moon.

This invention was later taken up and improved by the scientist and astronomer Richard Towneley who was the nephew of Gascoigne's friend Christopher Towneley. Towneley later brought the instrument to the attention of Robert Hooke, who used it to calculate the size of comets and other celestial bodies. The micrometer, as it became known, was to lie at the heart of astronomical measurement down to the twentieth century.

In 1642, civil war broke out in England, and Gascoigne received a commission as Providore for Yorkshire in the army of King Charles I. Crabtree lived in Broughton, just outside Manchester which was on the parliamentary side and all correspondence between the two ceased.

Gascoigne died at the Battle of Marston Moor, Yorkshire, on 2 July 1644 as did Charles Towneley, the father of his friend Richard Towneley.

After Gascoigne's death some of his papers and fragments of correspondence between Crabtree and Gascoigne came into the possession of Christopher and Richard Towneley. They brought them to the attention of John Flamsteed, the first Astronomer Royal, who came to see Horrocks, Crabtree, and Gascoigne as the founding fathers of British research astronomy and the intellectual heirs of Galileo and Kepler. He began his massive three-folio volume Historia Coelestis Britannica (1725) by printing five pages of their surviving letters and observations, made between 1638 and 1643.

Many of Gascoigne's papers and correspondence were lost during the English Civil War and later in the Great Fire of London, but most of what is known to remain is kept in the Bodleian Library at the University of Oxford.

== Legacy ==
In March 2018 Leeds Civic Trust unveiled a blue plaque in the city honouring Gascoigne. It was unveiled by David Sellers, who has written a biography of Gascoigne, who said:

Although his name is known by astronomers, his role as a pioneer in precision astronomy deserves wider public recognition. I hope that this plaque will help to achieve this and will encourage young people to follow his lead and inspire an interest in the natural world.

Local MP Hilary Benn was also present.

== Ancestry ==
Ancestors of William Gascoigne (scientist)

8. William Gascoigne of Thorpe
4. John Gascoigne of Thorpe on the Hill
9. Jane Grysse
2. Henry Gascoigne
10. Henry Tempest of Tong Hall (ancestor of the Tempest Baronets of Tong)
5. Margaret Tempest
11. Ellen Mirfield
1. William Gascoigne (scientist)
12.
6. William Cartwright of Newland
13.
3. Margaret Jane Cartwright
14.
7.
15.
