= The Manchester Murals =

Series of twelve paintings in Manchester, England

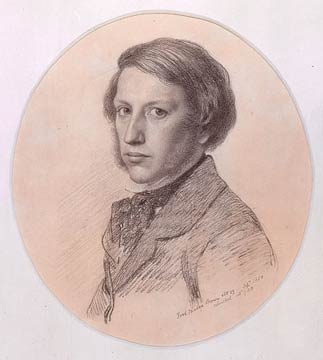
Ford Madox Brown, painter of The Manchester Murals

The Manchester Murals are twelve paintings by Ford Madox Brown in the Great Hall of Manchester Town Hall and are based on the history of Manchester. Following the success of Brown's painting Work he was commissioned to paint six murals for its Great Hall. Another six murals were to be completed by Frederic Shields who later withdrew, leaving Brown to complete all twelve works. The murals were begun in 1879, towards the end of Brown's career, but were not completed until 1893, the year he died. During this period he moved from London to Manchester with his family, first living in Crumpsall and then Victoria Park.

== Location ==
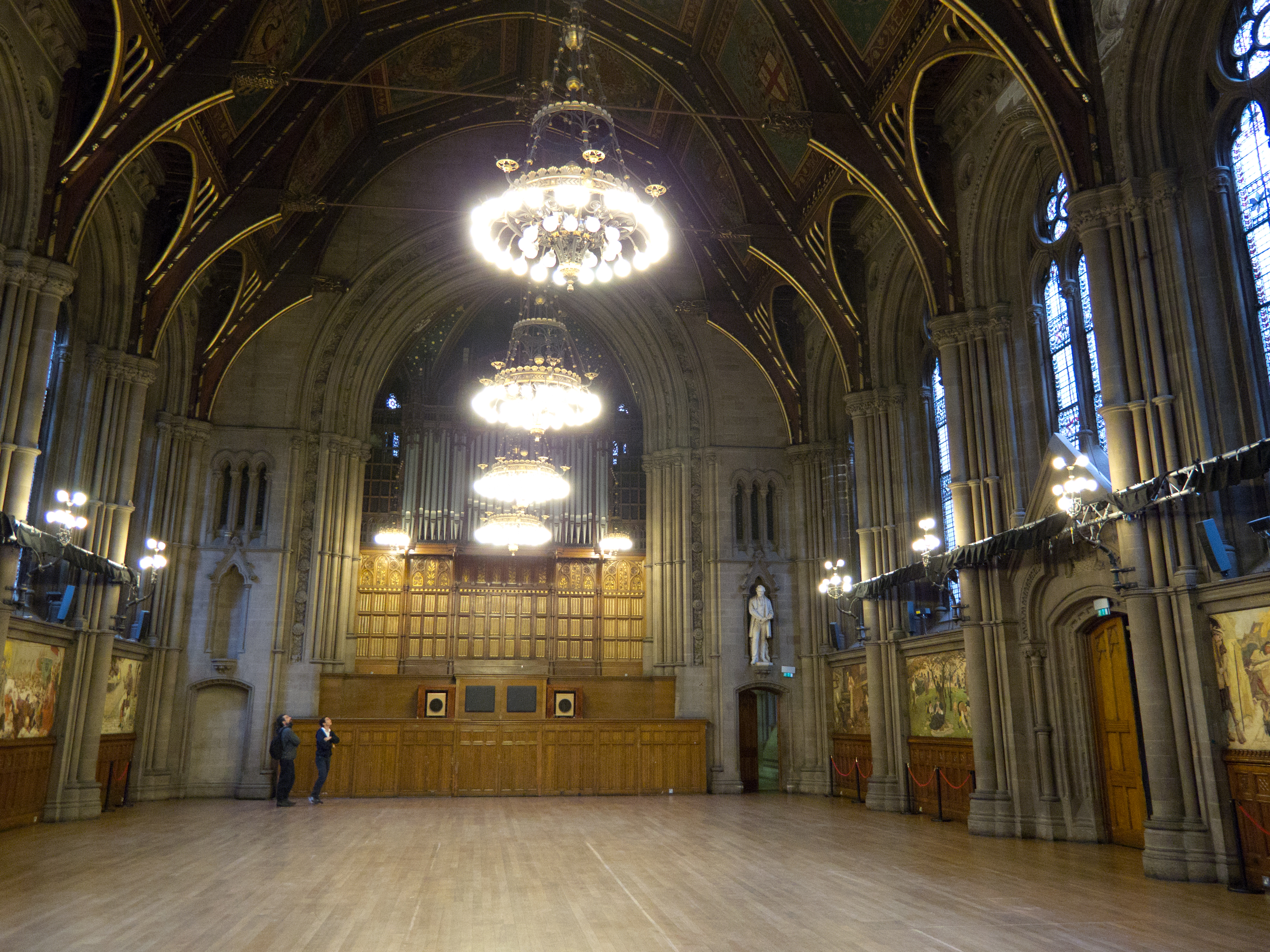
The twelve murals are located on opposite walls in the Great Hall.

The murals form part of the decoration of the Great Hall, the central room designed by Alfred Waterhouse. On entering the hall, six murals are on the left hand wall and six on the right, progressing chronologically from the left wall nearest the entrance to the right wall opposite, repeating the basic structure of the scheme of William Bell Scott's murals on the history of Northumbria in Wallington Hall.

== Subjects and meaning ==
The subjects chosen reflect the Victorian ideals through which the history of Manchester was seen, focusing on Christianity, commerce and the textile industry. The artist did a great deal of research to check the details for accuracy and he wrote their descriptions.

Recent commentators have identified satirical and critical features in the compositions which complicate any simple explanation of the paintings as expressions of "Victorian ideals" that the chosen subjects imply. The art historian Julie F. Codell refers to these as the "pratfalls and penultimates" of history, as opposed to its stately progress.

Most of the paintings contain Hogarthian satire (in contrast to Bell Scott's works). In the first picture the wife of the Roman general wearing a blond wig distracts him from his work; their son – a Caligula in the making – kicks an African servant. The painting that seems to celebrate industrial technology, John Kay: Inventor of the Fly Shuttle, depicts the hysterical inventor fleeing from an unruly mob which is bent on destroying the machine. Instead of culminating in the achievement of modern Manchester, the sequence concludes with a rustic scene in a small village. According to Codell, history is portrayed as fragmented, contested, and as ending in a "penultimate" moment. This may be related to Brown's interest in anarchism and William Morris's utopian socialism at the time, but it also arises from disputes about the more modern subjects. Paintings depicting the Peterloo Massacre in 1819 and the end of the Lancashire Cotton Famine in 1865 had been proposed, but were rejected by the council's committee as too controversial.

== Technique ==
All but the last four murals were painted directly on to the wall. They were not created using the true fresco process but taking advantage of a Victorian technique, the Gambier Parry process, which was "spirit" based producing a more hard-wearing image. Brown completed the last four murals on canvas, after he had returned to live in London.

== Murals ==
Image	Description
	The Romans Building a Fort at Mancenion; The mural depicts the building of a Roman fort by enslaved Britons while a Roman general gives the orders. The fort, now known as Mamucium, was at what is now the area of Castlefield, near the centre of Manchester.
	The Baptism of Edwin; The mural depicts the baptism of Edwin of Northumbria, who was also king of Deira which included the Manchester area, at York, watched by his Christian wife Ethelburga and family.
	The Expulsion of the Danes from Manchester; The mural depicts the retreat of the Danes from Manchester – showing soldiers carrying their general on a stretcher.
	The Establishment of Flemish Weavers in Manchester A.D. 1363; Queen Philippa of Hainault greets Flemish weavers who were invited to England under Edward III of England's act of 1337.
	The Trial of Wycliffe A.D. 1377 John Wycliffe is depicted on trial, defended by his patron, John of Gaunt. Geoffrey Chaucer, another protégé of Gaunt's, acts as recorder.
	The Proclamation regarding Weights and Measures A.D. 1556; In 1556, Manchester's Court passed an edict directing that "The Burgess and others of the Town of Manchester shall send in all manner of Weights and Measures to be tried by their Majesties standard."
	Crabtree watching the Transit of Venus A.D. 1639; William Crabtree, a draper who lived in Broughton, was asked by a curate friend, Jeremiah Horrocks, to observe the Transit of Venus, on 24 November 1639. Crabtree's diligence and rigour enabled him to correct Horrocks' faulty calculations and to observe the transit on 4 December.
	Chetham's Life's Dream A.D. 1640; The mural depicts merchant philanthropist Humphrey Chetham's dream of the charity school for poor boys founded in his will of 1653, which became Chetham's School of Music in 1969. Chetham is portrayed studying his will to the right of the painting.
	Bradshaw's Defence of Manchester A.D. 1642; During the English Civil War, Manchester was besieged by Royalist troops under the command of Lord Strange. It was, however, John Rosworm, not John Bradshaw as depicted, who defended the town. This was the last of the paintings to be completed. It is not strictly a mural, since Brown was by this time too frail to work in the hall. It was painted on canvas and adhered to the wall.
	John Kay, Inventor of the Fly Shuttle A.D. 1753; The invention, by John Kay, of the flying shuttle revolutionised weaving. The mural depicts rioters, who feared their jobs were in danger, breaking in to destroy the loom, while Kay is being smuggled to safety.
	The Opening of the Bridgewater Canal A.D. 1761; The 3rd Duke of Bridgewater owned coal mines in Worsley, and collaborated with engineer James Brindley to build the Bridgewater Canal to carry coal into Manchester. The Duke is shown standing on a barge decorated with flags of his coat of arms, observing the launch of the first coal barges on his new canal. He is accompanied by Brindley and the Earl and Countess of Stamford.
	Dalton collecting Marsh-Fire Gas; The mural depicts the scientist John Dalton collecting gases. His studies led to the development of atomic theory.

== See also ==
- List of paintings by Ford Madox Brown
