= Margaret Jane Benson =

English botanist

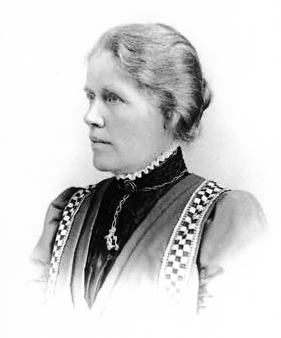
- Benson c. 1911
- Born: 20 October 1859; London, England
- Died: 20 June 1936 (aged 76); Highgate, London
- Education: University College London (BSc, DSc)
- Scientific career
- Fields: Botany
- Workplaces: Royal Holloway College
- Doctoral advisor: Francis Wall Oliver
- Doctoral students: Emily Mary Berridge; Helen Gwynne-Vaughan; Nesta Ferguson
- Other notable students: Theodora Lisle Prankerd

Margaret Jane Benson (20 October 1859 – 20 June 1936) was an English botanist specialising in paleobotany, and one of the first female members of the Linnean Society of London. Most of her career was spent as the head of the Department of Botany at Royal Holloway College, University of London from 1893 to 1922. In 1927, a botanical laboratory was dedicated in her name. She travelled extensively with Ethel Sargant, collecting specimens, laboratory equipment, and meeting other botanists around the world. Her students included Dame Helen Gwynne-Vaughan, Theodora Lisle Prankerd, Nesta Ferguson, and Emily Mary Berridge.

== Early life and education ==
Benson was born 20 October 1859 in London to William Benson and Edmunda Bourne, who was the daughter of the landscape painter James Bourne. Benson's mother was also a painter and exhibited at the Royal Academy of Art.

Benson was introduced to botany by her father, an engineer and architect with an interest in the subject. She was first educated by her sister, who had attended Queen's College. In 1878–9 she studied Classical Studies for one year at Newnham College, Cambridge, before working for seven years as a teacher at Exeter High School in order to have the finance for university study. She then matriculated to University College London in 1887 and earned her bachelor's degree in botany with first class honors from the university in 1891. She gained a Marion Kennedy research scholarship and earned her doctorate in 1894 from the University of London, working with Francis Wall Oliver. Her work focused on embryology of a category of Fagales that were called Amentiferae at the time.

== Work and achievements ==
Benson started working as a lecturer at Royal Holloway College in 1889. Benson was appointed head of the Botany Department at Royal Holloway College in 1893, and remained so until her retirement in 1922. She was the first female Botanist to become a department head in the UK. In 1897, Benson travelled around Europe with Ethel Sargant to gain equipment and knowledge to set up the department. Benson is also credited with planning and stocking the botanical garden, herbarium and museum.

Benson made various collecting trips for botanical material, including to Australia in 1905–1906, and to Australia, Java and India in 1914-15. Her observations of herbaceous plants from the early Paleozoic era and the earliest true ferns are considered notable. She proposed a model for the evolution of the ovule, which remains a likely explanation. She also described the species Cordaites felicis found in coal deposits in England. To adopt the new technique of microscopic anatomy of fossils, she cut sections herself with a gas-powered machine in her garden shed. Her papers are characterised by precise drawings and wash-paintings which are believed to be produced by Benson herself.

In 1904, she became a fellow of the Linnean Society of London, one of the first fifteen women who were admitted. In 1912 she was made a professor by the University of London.

== Death and legacy ==
Upon her retirement in 1922, Benson was succeeded by Professor Elizabeth Marianne Blackwell as Head of Botany at Royal Holloway College. Benson died in Highgate on 20 June 1936, and Blackwell authored Benson's official obituary.

== Publications ==
- M Benson (1893) Contributions to the Embryology of the Amentiferæ.—Part I. Transactions of the Linnean Society of London. 2nd Series: Botany 3(10):409-–424
- M Benson (1902) A new Lycopodiaceous seed-like organ. The New Phytologist 1(3): 58-59
- M Benson (1902) The fruitification of Lyginodendron oldhamium. Annals of Botany os-16(3): 575–576
- M Benson (1904) Telangium Scotti, a new Species of Telangium (Calymmatotheca) showing structure. Annals of Botany 18(69): 161-177
- M Benson, E Sanday, E Berridge (1906) III. Contributions to the Embryology of the Amentiferæ.—Part II. Carpinus Betulus. Transactions of the Linnean Society of London. 2nd Series: Botany 7(3):37–44
- M Benson (1908) The Sporangiophore - A Unit of Structure in the Pteridophyta. The New Phytologist 7: 143-149
- M Benson (1908) X. Miadesmia membranacea, Bertand; a new Palœozoic Lycopod with a seed-like structure. Philosophical Transactions of the Royal Society B 199 (251-261): 409-425
- M Benson (1908) On the Contents of the Pollen Chamber of a Specimen of Lagenostoma ovoides. Biological Gazette 45(6): 409-412
- M Benson and EJ Welsford (1909) The Morphology of the Ovule and female flower of Juglans regia and of a few allied genera. Annals of Botany 23(92):623-633
- M Benson (1910) Root Parasitism in Exocarpus (with comparative Notes on the Haustoria of Thesium). Annals of Botany, os-24 (4): 667–677
- M Benson (1911) New observations on Botryopteris antiqua, Kidston. Annals of Botany 25(100):1045-1057
- M Benson (1912) Cordaites felicis, nov. sp., a Cordaitean leaf from the lower coal measures of England. Annals of Botany os-26(1):201-207
- M Benson (1914) I.—Sphærostoma ovale (Conostoma ovale et intermedium, Williamson), a Lower Carboniferous Ovule from Pettycur, Fifeshire, Scotland. Earth and Environment Transactions of the Royal Society of Edinburgh 50(1): 1-17
- M Benson (1918) Mazocarpon or the Structural Sigillariostrobus. Annals of Botany 32(128):569-589
- M Benson (1921) The grouping of vascular plants. The New Phytologist 20(2): 82-89
- M Benson (1922) Hetertheca Grievii the microsporange of Heterangium Grievii. Botanical Gazette 74(2): 121-142
- M Benson and E Blackwell (1926) Observations on a lumbered area in Surrey from 1917 to 1925. Journal of Ecology 14(1):120-137
- M Benson (1933) The Roots and Habit of Heterangium Grievii. Annals of Botany os-47(2): 313–315

== See also ==
- Timeline of women in science
