= Francis Wall Oliver =

English botanist and university teacher

Francis Wall Oliver FRS
- Born: 10 May 1864
- Died: 14 September 1951 (aged 87)
- Education: Friends School, Kendal; Bootham School, York; Trinity College, Cambridge
- Occupation: botanist
- Known for: Professor of Botany, University College, London
- Notable work: Makers of British Botany, Exploitation of Plants
- Awards: Linnean Medal

Francis Wall Oliver FRS (10 May 1864 – 14 September 1951) was an English botanist whose interests evolved from plant anatomy to palaeobotany to ecology.

Oliver was from a Quaker (Society of Friends) family and was educated first at the Friends School, Kendal, then at Bootham School, York, and finally at Trinity College, Cambridge, where he took a first-class degree in natural sciences.^{[1]}

His father, Daniel, was Professor of Botany at University College London (UCL), and Keeper of the Herbarium at the Royal Botanic Gardens (RBG), Kew, Surrey. As a result, Francis was familiar with the leading botanists of the period from a young age. His father was a confidant of Sir Joseph Dalton Hooker, Director of the RBG, and a correspondent of Charles Darwin, advising Darwin on a number of botanical questions.

Francis (aka ‘Frank’) Oliver succeeded his father at UCL, first as Quain Lecturer, 1888, and then as Quain Professor of Botany in 1890. His career was notable for its encouragement of female botanists, such as Margaret Jane Benson, Ethel Thomas, and Marie Stopes. He regularly led field courses, at Blakeney on the north Norfolk coast (where a field laboratory is named after him) and at the Bouche d’Erquy, in Brittany; courses were open to both men and women, a mixing of the sexes that was rare at the time.

Francis Oliver, like his father, was a collector of art, and artists. After his marriage in 1896 to Mildred Alice Thompson (a fellow mountaineering enthusiast), he and his bride settled in The Vale, Chelsea, at the heart of London's artistic community. William De Morgan, the potter, was an immediate neighbour and good friend.

Among Francis Oliver's publications are two books that display his wide interests in botany and the advance of his subject. Makers of British Botany, edited by Oliver, explored the work of botanists from Robert Morison and John Ray, of the 17th century, to Harry Marshall Ward and Joseph Hooker of the late 19th century. In the Exploitation of Plants, he examined the relevance of his subject to everyday life, including chapters by invited authors such as Ethel Thomas and Marie Stopes and writing some chapters himself.

In 1930, Oliver retired from UCL, taking part-time Chairs of Botany in Cairo and in Alexandria. Living at Burg el Arab on the Western edge of the Libyan desert, he completed some of the first ecological studies of the desert, compiling maps that may have been useful to the opposing armies in WWII. Although, war permitting, he returned to Britain to escape the Egyptian summers, he only settled permanently in Britain in 1950. He died suddenly at Limpsfield Common, Surrey, in 1951.

Francis Oliver was elected a Fellow of the Royal Society in 1905. He was awarded the Linnean Medal in 1925.^{[1]}
