= Richard Jackson (antiquary) =

English antiquarian

- Born: 1623; Cuerden
- Died: Between 1690 and 1695
- Occupation: Antiquarian

Richard Jackson (1623–1690?), also known as Richard Kuerden, was an English antiquarian.

== Biography ==
Jackson was the son of Gilbert Jackson and his wife Ann Leyland, was born at Cuerden, near Preston, Lancashire, in 1623. He received his early education at Leyland, Lancashire, under Mr. Sherburn, and was admitted a commoner of St. Mary Hall, Oxford, in 1638. On the outbreak of the war he removed to Emmanuel College, Cambridge, where he graduated B.A. in 1642. In 1646 he returned to Oxford, graduated M.A. 22 March, and was elected vice-principal of St. Mary Hall and tutor. He was a staunch royalist, and declined the office of proctor of the university rather than submit to the parliamentary government. He then began the study of medicine, and in 1652 was appointed ‘replicant to all inceptors of physic,’ which office qualified him for the degree of M.D. After paying the fees he, however, again declined to take the required oath, and it was not until after the Restoration that he was made M.D. (26 March 1663). At that time he was settled at Preston as a physician. He appears as a freeman of the borough on the Guild Merchant Rolls of 1662 and 1682. According to Wood, he neglected his practice, and devoted himself to the study of antiquities. In conjunction with Christopher Townley of Carr Hall he contemplated the publication of a complete history of Lancashire, but the project was frustrated by Townley's death in 1674. Jackson afterwards issued proposals for publishing his work under the title of ‘Brigantia Lancastriensis Restaurata; or History of the Honourable Dukedom or County Palatine of Lancaster, in 5 vols. in folio,’ 1688. No further progress was made, and the manuscripts, in a crabbed and almost illegible hand, and consisting of crude materials without arrangement, are now preserved in the Heralds' College (8 vols.), the Chetham Library, Manchester (2 vols.), and the British Museum (1 vol.). A fragmentary but valuable itinerary of some parts of Lancashire from his pen is given in Earwaker's ‘Local Gleanings,’ 1876. He was a friend of Sir William Dugdale, and acted as his deputy and marshal at a visitation held at Lancaster. It is supposed that he died between 1690 and 1695.
