= Emily Mary Berridge =

British paleobotanist and bacteriologist

- Born: 1872
- Died: 8 October 1947 (aged 74–75)
- Education: Royal Holloway College,
- Awards: FLS
- Scientific career
- Fields: Botany
- Workplaces: University of Liverpool, University of London
- Doctoral advisor: Margaret Jane Benson

Emily Mary Berridge FLS (1872-1947) was an English palaeobotanist and bacteriologist. She was among the first group of women admitted to the Linnean Society.

== Personal life ==
Berridge was born in 1872 and educated at Dulwich High School, Kent. The headmistress, Miss Arnold, encouraged her ambitions for a career in science. She studied at the University of London, gaining B. Sc. in Physics from Bedford College in 1898 and subsequently studied natural sciences at Royal Holloway College, with an award of D. Sc.. Prior to her graduation she was also a research student at both University College (1906) and Imperial College (1910).

She died on 8 October 1947.

== Academic career ==
She worked with Professor Margaret Benson for her doctoral studies. These were on topics related to fossil plants, particularly relevant to the Gnetales and Amentiferae. They worked on several topics including the fertilisation of Carpinus betulus (European Hornbeam) and embryology of the Amentiferae.

In 1916 Berridge commenced an appointment at University of Liverpool in the Thompson Yates Laboratory that changed the direction of her research. She worked with Ernest Glynn on the bacteria responsible for fever and dysentery among soldiers returning from Egypt during the First World War. She remained there until 1919 working on aspects related to the interaction of the bacteria with serum applying technologies such as agglutination.

She then returned to London and between 1921 - 1930 worked in the Department of Botany at Imperial College on the physiology and pathogenicity of plant disease bacteria. She made use of her knowledge of agglutination in these later botanical studies.

She subsequently created a Botanical Research Fund for postgraduate students, funded by herself, and donated equipment and materials to Royal Holloway, her alma mater.

== Honours ==
Berridge was elected a Fellow of the Linnean Society in 1905 and was subsequently among the first women to read a paper to the Society, in November 1905.

== Publications ==
- Emily M. Berridge (1905) On two new specimens of Spencerites insignis. Annals of Botany 19 273-280
- Emily M. Berridge (1909) Fertilization in Ephedra altissima. Annals of Botany 23 509-U105
- Mary G Thoday (Sykes) and Emily M Berridge (1912) The Anatomy and Morphology of the inflorescences and flowers of Ephedra: With Plate LXXXV and twenty-one Figures in the Text. Annals of Botany 26 953–986
- Emily M. Berridge (1914) The structure of the flower of Fagaceae, and its bearing on the affinities of the group. Annals of Botany 28 509-526
- Emily M. Berridge and E. Glynn (1920) Observations on the classification of forty-eight strains of Flexner-Y and allied bacilli mainly by serological tests. Journal of Pathology and Bacteriology 23 199-216
- SG Paine and Emily M. Berridge (1921) Studies in bacteriosis V Further investigation of a suggested bacteriolytic action in Proteacynaroides affected with the leaf-spot disease. Annals of Applied Biology 8 20-26
- Emily M. Berridge (1924) The influence of hydrogen-ion concentration on the growth of certain bacterial plant parasites and saprophytes. Annals of Applied Biology 11 73-85
- MM Mehta and Emily M. Berridge (1924) Studies in bacteriosis - XII. B. pyocyaneus as a cause of disease in lettuce and the identity of B. marginale with this organism. Annals of Applied Biology 11 318-323
- Emily M. Berridge (1926) Studies in bacteriosis XIV Chemical agglutination as a means of differentiating bacterial species causing soft rot of potatoes and other vegetables. Annals of Applied Biology 13 12-18
- Emily M. Berridge (1929) Studies in bacteriosis - XVI The agglutinating and plasmolytic action of the sap of the potato on various parasitic and sapro phytic species of bacteria. Annals of Applied Biology 16 567-577
- Emily M. Berridge (1930) Studies in bacteriosis XVII Acidic relations between the Crown gall organism and its host. Annals of Applied Biology 17 280-283
