= John Hopkinson (antiquary) =

English antiquarian

- Born: 1610
- Died: 28 February 1680
- Occupation: Antiquarian

John Hopkinson (1610 – 28 February 1680) was an English antiquarian.

== Biography ==
Hopkinson was the son of George Hopkinson of Lofthouse, near Leeds, by his second wife, Judith, daughter of John Langley of Horbury, was born at Lofthouse in 1610. He states that he was a member of Lincoln's Inn, and for some part of the reign of Charles I he was clerk of the peace for the county of York. Thoresby, in his ‘Diary,’ infers that he had been Norroy king-of-arms, meaning really deputy to that officer. When Sir William Dugdale made a visitation of the county of York in 1665–6, Hopkinson accompanied him as his secretary. In spare moments he employed himself in transcribing old deeds connected with Yorkshire families, and also in drawing out the pedigrees of the Yorkshire gentry. In this way he slowly accumulated a very extensive antiquarian miscellany in manuscript, which has been largely used by local historians and genealogists. Hopkinson was well enough known and respected to have special letters of protection granted to him and his father during the civil war by both the Marquis of Newcastle and Fairfax. He died 28 February 1680, and was buried at Rothwell, near Leeds, where there is a monument to his memory in the chancel of the church.

Hopkinson's collections, which comprised at least eighty volumes, passed on his death to his sister Jane, who had married Richard Richardson. About half came by descent into the possession of Frances Mary Richardson Currer [q. v.] of North Bierley and Eshton in Yorkshire, and from her passed to her relative, Sir Matthew Wilson. These have been catalogued by the Historical Manuscripts Commission. The other portion were in the possession of J. G. F. Smyth of Heath, near Wakefield, who is also descended from Richard Richardson and Jane Hopkinson.

Many copies of Hopkinson's various collections have been made, especially of the genealogies of the West Riding families. One is in the British Museum, Harl. 4630. Another, much enlarged and corrected by Thomas Wilson, F.S.A., is in the Leeds Library.
