= Johannes Remus Quietanus =

German astronomer, astrologer and doctor

Johann Ruderauf or Johannes Remus Quietanus (Herda 1588 – Rouffach 1654) was a German astronomer, astrologer and doctor. He maintained correspondence with Galileo Galilei, Johannes Kepler and Giovanni Faber, a pontifical botanist. He is one of the first four observers of transit of Mercury that happened on 7 November 1631.

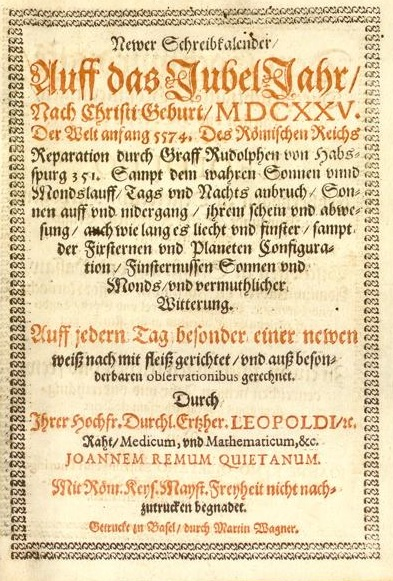
Remus Quietanus: The 1625 Calendar

== Biography ==
=== Early life in Thuringia ===
Johann Ruderauf was born on 22 September 1588 in Herda, near Bad Salzungen in Thuringia (Germany). His father Jeremias Ruderauf (or Rudravius) was a pastor and a schoolmaster. In the Julian Calendar, Johann was baptised as a Protestant on 15 September 1588. (Note: The date of baptism 15 September 1588 follows Julian Calendar. This is consistent with the date of birth that Johann Ruderauf himself mentioned in a letter to Kepler)

He enrolled at the University of Jena in 1605.

In 1607, he observed the passage of a comet, and then wrote a booklet of some fifty pages titled Gründliche Beschreibung des neuen monstrosischen Sternes, welcher anno Christi 1607 …am hohen Himmel geleichtet, (Accurate description of the new monstrous star that shone in the sky from July 27 to mid-October in 1607), where he proposed an astrological interpretation of this "sign of God". This was actually Halley's Comet that did not yet bear the current name.

In 1608, he went to Italy. Probably he had never returned to his native country thereafter.

=== Study and work in Italy ===
Johann Ruderauf registered at the University of Padua in 1608, where he studied medicine. There he was also acquainted with Galileo.

In Italy, he took up the Latinized name Johannes Remus Quietanus and converted to Catholicism. In 1609, he made a southbound trip to Sicily and Malta.

In 1611, he was in Rome, where he sent the first letter to Kepler. In the next years, he studied in the Collegio Romano with professor Christoph Grienberger. Remus Quietanus was well received by the pontifical circle, he befriended a number of cardinals and Giovanni Faber, secretary of the Accademia dei Lincei.

He made astronomical observations, especially solar and lunar eclipses, and wrote two pamphlets on this subject.

=== Doctor of Habsburg ===
In 1618, Remus Quietanus went to the court of Archduke Maximilian III of Austria in Innsbruck. There he met Christoph Scheiner. After the death of Maximilian in Vienna on 2 November 1618, Remus Quietanus was appointed the Imperial Doctor, serving Matthias, Holy Roman Emperor, and also his cousin Leopold V, the new Archduke of Austria-Tyrol.

In 1619, he met Johannes Kepler in Linz.

=== Witness of the Thirty Years' War ===
In his correspondence with Giovanni Faber(1618-1622), Remus Quietanus reported the outbreak of the Thirty Years' War, and military events favorable to Habsburg in Bohemia.

But soon after Mansfeld moved the theater of conflict to Alsace. Leopold V, who was also the bishop of Strasbourg, was obliged to go there to defend his possessions. Remus Quietanus joined his entourage.

In 1619, Remus Quietanus met Maria Schlitzweck, a young Alsatian lady he would soon marry. (Note: He announced their engagement in a letter to Kepler on 13 August 1619.)

=== Doctor in Rouffach ===
He settled in Rouffach around 1620. His wife gave birth to a boy in 1623. Remus Quietanus was named the physician (doctor) of the city.

Maria Schlitzweck died on 27 February 1635. Quietanus married again in 1650 to Maria Helena Freudenstehlin, who came from Ensisheim.

Remus Quietanus died in Rouffach on 17 October 1654.

== Correspondence with Kepler and Galileo ==
When Remus Quietanus wrote to Kepler in Rome in 1611, the two men did not know each other yet. Quietanus commented on recent astronomical news, yet expressed some reservations on Copernicus' heliocentric system. Kepler answered him point by point in March 1612. This correspondence resumed in 1618 when Quietanus was the doctor of the princes of Habsburg. Kepler looked forward to a future collaboration, but their partnership was limited to an exchange of 15 letters until 1620. The contact was reestablished from 1628 to 1630, the year when Kepler died.

In 1619, Remus Quietanus exchanged three letters with Galileo. Quietanus sent to Galileo his description of the 1618 comet and a copy of Kepler's Epitome Astronomiae Copernicanae, which was not circulated in Florence as it was put on the Index Librorum Prohibitorum by the Roman Catholic Church. Because of his position, Quietanus played an intermediary role between the two principal actors of the Copernican Revolution whose relations had already deteriorated.

== The transit of Mercury in 1631 ==
In his Rudolphine Tables published in 1627, Kepler predicted the transit of inferior planets at the end of 1631: 7 November for Mercury and 9 December for Venus. Until then, no one had been able to observe such phenomena. He reiterated his announcement in 1629 by publishing a reminder (Admonitio ad astronomos).

Informed by this prediction, Johannes Remus Quietanus observed the transit of Mercury in Rouffach on 7 November 1631 from 9 h 42. He wrote a short report, addressed to the archduke Leopold V.

This transit of Mercury was also observed by Pierre Gassendi in Paris, by Johann Baptist Cysat in Innsbruck and by an anonymous person in Ingolstadt.

== Publications ==
=== Calendars and diaries ===
Starting from 1624, Remus Quietanus published regularly (probably every year) calendars containing the ephemerides of planets and weather forecasts. The first known edition is “Neuer Schreibkalender, auff das Jubel Jahr 1625(…)“, Basel 1624, (New Calendar for the Year of Grace 1625(…) Containing the Real Course of the Sun and the Moon, the Sunrise and Sunset, the Lunar Phase and the Planetary Configurations, the Solar and Lunar Eclipses and the Probable Weather Conditions). It is presented in the form of a diary. Extant copies or references of the Schreibkalender can be found for the years of 1624, 1625, 1626, 1627, 1629, 1630, 1631, 1638, 1641, 1650.

=== Other publications ===
- Gründliche Beschreibung des neuen monstrosischen Sternes welcher Anno Christi 1607 (…) vom 27 Juli bis helfte october am hohen Himmel geleichtet (J.Rudrauff, Rudravius Herdenses, Erfurt 1607) Description of the passage of the 1607 comet, with astrological interpretation.
- Restitutio universalis Motuum caelestium in stellis fixis, sole, luna, et maxime eclipsibus. (…) Johannes Remus Quietanus Tyrigoetam, Doctor in Philosophy and Medicine, Rome 1615, manuscript, description on past and forthcoming eclipses.
- Observationes eclipsis lunaris anno Christi MDCXVI. XXVI. Augusti nocte sequente Romae habitae. Ex qua et aliis tribus exquisitis demonstrantur distantiae, magnitudines, & proportions corporum ac sphaerarum Solis, & Lunae, ac umbrae Terrenae, una cum comparatione calculi Alphonsini, Copernicaei, Brahaei, & Magini, Rome 1616. Description of the lunar eclipse on 26 August 1616, comparison between models of Alfonsine tables, Nicolaus Copernicus, Tycho Brahe and Giovanni Antonio Magini.
- Observationes et descriptiones duorum cometarum qui anno 1618… (Remus Quietanus, Innsbruck 1619), manuscript, description of the 1618 comets, addressed to Galileo, there exists a German edition printed by Daniel Paur, Innsbruck, 1619.
- Historia morbi quo Arch. Austriae Leopold fuit affectus… Vienne 1622. Report of medical care provided to the Archduke Leopold V.
- Natürliche Practica und Witterung, auf dass Jahr der Geburt Jesu Christi, M.DC.XLII. Im 24. Jahr der beharrlichen Kriegen in Teutschlandt, Remus Quietanus, Spannseil, Colmar, 1641 : Natural practices and meteorology for the year 1642, in the 24th year of incessant wars in Germany, an almanac with astronomical forecasts, meteorological, political, medical advice and gardening.
- Astronomischer und astrologischer Discurs von der grossen Zusammenkunfft ... der zweyen höchsten Planeten ... des Saturni u. Jupiters Remus Quietanus, Spannseil, Colmar 1642. Prediction of the conjunction of the planets Jupiter and Saturn for 1643, astrological interpretation.

== Posterity ==
Apart from the first observation of the Mercury transit, relatively little is known of Remus Quietanus, a privileged witness of the Copernican revolution. But he is not a passive observer. In his correspondence with Kepler, he took part in astronomical debate and asked questions that fitted exactly with the issues of his time: the calculation of longitudes, the nature of comets, the dimension of planets, their distances to the sun and especially the distance from the Earth to the Sun (Astronomical unit). On the last point, he had a better intuition than Kepler who gave an estimation of 3400 of Earth radius. Remus Quietanus proposed 14,000. Not until 1685 did Christiaan Huygens suggest a more accurate estimation (around 23,500 of Earth radius).

== Bibliography ==
- Max Caspar, Johannes Kepler Gesammelte Werke, 1937, volumes 16, 17 and 18.
- Klaus-Dieter Herbst, Biobilographisches Handbuch der Kalendermacher 1550-1750 Remus Quietanus, Johannes, Institut Deutsche Presseforschung, 2017.
- Klaus-Dieter Herbst, « Die erstmalige Benutzung von Keplers Rudolphinischen Tafeln für die Herstellung eines Schreibkalenders », Acta Historica Astronomiae, 40, 2010, p. 160-169.
- Jacques Mertzeisen, Jean-Pierre Luminet, Homage to Quietanus, Inference, International Review of Science, 2017.
