= James Bourne (artist) =

British artist (1773–1854)

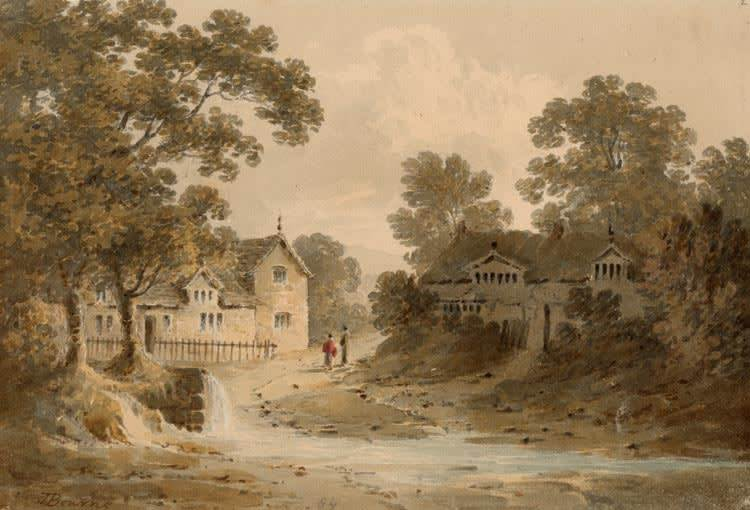
Broughton Spout by James Bourne

James Bourne, (Dalby, Lincolnshire 1773 – Sutton Coldfield 1854) was a watercolour landscape painter, working in London in the early part of the nineteenth century who later became a Methodist minister.

== Life ==
Bourne was born at Dalby in Lincolnshire in 1773. He was in London in 1789, and then moved to Manchester, before returning to London in about 1796, where he worked as a drawing master, going on sketching tours during the summers. He exhibited at the Royal Manchester Institution and between 1800 and 1809 at the Royal Academy. His address is given in the catalogues as 30, Park Street, Grosvenor Square in 1805, and 20, Princes Street, Cavendish Square for the next four years.

In 1848 he gave up art for the Methodist ministry. He died in Sutton Coldfield in 1854, survived by his widow and seven of his eight children. His daughter was Edmunda Bourne, mother of Margaret Jane Benson.

Several of Bourne's watercolours are in the Victoria and Albert Museum. They include a view of Dalby Hall, in Lincolnshire, which was owned by his brother. An engraving of the hall after a drawing by Bourne was published in the Copper-plate Magazine in 1801.

A selection of Bourne's letters, with a memoir, was published in 1861, under the title Letters by the late James Bourne: (in his latter years minister of the gospel at Sutton Coldfield); with Outlines of his Life written by himself, and an Account of his Death
