= Much Hoole =

Village in Lancashire, England

Coordinates: 53.703°N 2.801°W

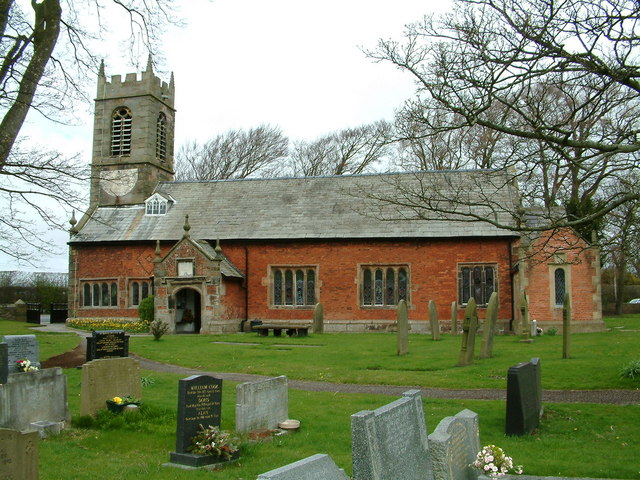
- St Michael's Parish Church

- Shown within South Ribble Location within Lancashire
- Population: 1,997
- OS grid reference: SD471232
- Civil parish: Much Hoole
- District: South Ribble
- Shire county: Lancashire
- Region: North West
- Country: England
- Sovereign state: United Kingdom
- Post town: PRESTON
- Postcode district: PR4
- Dialling code: 01772
- Police: Lancashire
- Fire: Lancashire
- Ambulance: North West
- UK Parliament: South Ribble

Much Hoole is a village and civil parish in the borough of South Ribble, Lancashire, England. The parish of Much Hoole had a population of 1,851 at the time of the 2001 census, increasing to 1,997 at the 2011 Census.

== History ==
Hoole derives from the Old English hulu, a shed or hovel. It was recorded as Hull in 1204, Hole in 1212 and Hoole in 1508. Magna Hole was recorded in 1235, Much Hole in 1260 and Grett Wholle in 1551.

At Much Hoole there are the remains of a medieval settlement and moat adjacent to Town Lane. Hoole gave its name to a family in the reign of King John and the parish has been held by the Montebegon family and by others, including those of Sir Thomas Hesketh and George Anthony Legh Keck.

== Governance ==
The township was separated from Croston in 1642, and made into a parish in the Leyland hundred of Lancashire. It became part of the Preston Poor Law Union, formed in 1837, which took responsibility for the administration and funding of the Poor Law and built a workhouse in the area.

The parish was part of Preston Rural District throughout its existence from 1894 to 1974. In 1974 the parish became part of South Ribble.

== Religion ==
A chapel is mentioned in a grant of about 1280 by Amery de Hoole but it is not known what happened to it. St Michael's Church was built of brick in 1628 and a stone tower was added when it was rebuilt in 1720. The church was funded by the Stone family who lived at Carr House. Jeremiah Horrocks, who predicted the transit of Venus in 1639, was a curate at St Michael's. He is commemorated in some of the church's windows.

== Geography ==
Much Hoole lies eight miles south west of Preston on the A59 from Preston to Ormskirk and Liverpool. It covers 1,701 acres (688 ha) of flat low-lying land. The soil is loam, peat moss and marsh. The River Douglas, which leads to the Ribble Estuary, forms Much Hoole's western boundary. Carr Brook forms its southern boundary. The highest land reaches 70 feet (21 m) above sea level in the east along the boundary with Leyland. The Preston to Southport line (closed in 1964), built by the Lancashire and Yorkshire Railway, crosses the north-west corner of the township.

== Population ==
Population growth in Much Hoole from 1881 to 1961
Year	1881	1891	1901	1911	1921	1931	1951	1961
Population	581	567	624	627	613	621	716	745
Much Hoole CP/Tn

== Transport ==
The A59 (Liverpool Road) runs through part of Much Hoole but mainly by-passes the village to the west. The village has regular bus services linking it with Preston, Southport and other local villages. Main roads in the village include the former main road, Liverpool Old Road, which passes through the centre of the village and Town Lane, which merges into Smithy Lane.

Much Hoole and Little Hoole were served by Hoole railway station on the West Lancashire Railway until the line closed in 1964.

In December 2005, plans for a 'microlight farm airstrip' between Bretherton and Much Hoole were rejected by Chorley and South Ribble councillors due to the fear of sound pollution and damage to the surrounding environment.

== Facilities ==
There are two public houses, the Smithy Inn and the Fox Cub. The Rose and Crown, once owned by Albert Pierrepoint the Chief Executioner and the Black Horse pub have been converted to restaurants.

The village primary school is Hoole St. Michael's. The village has a village hall, a park, tennis courts, and a bowling green. In 2006 the Little Chef was converted into an ice cream parlour and tapas bar. Nearby property has been redeveloped into a small shopping and business park. There are new housing developments in the village.

== Gallery ==
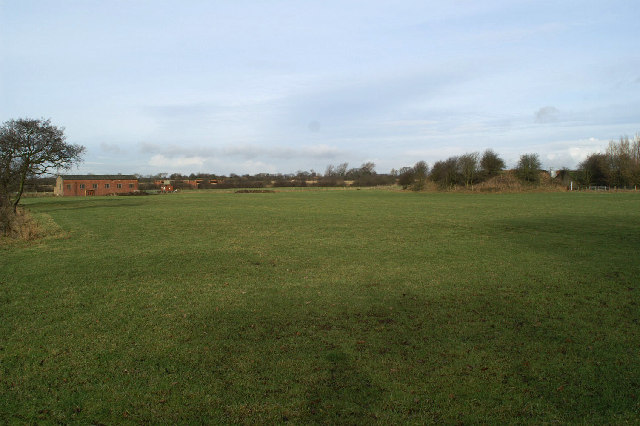
Fields around Much Hoole

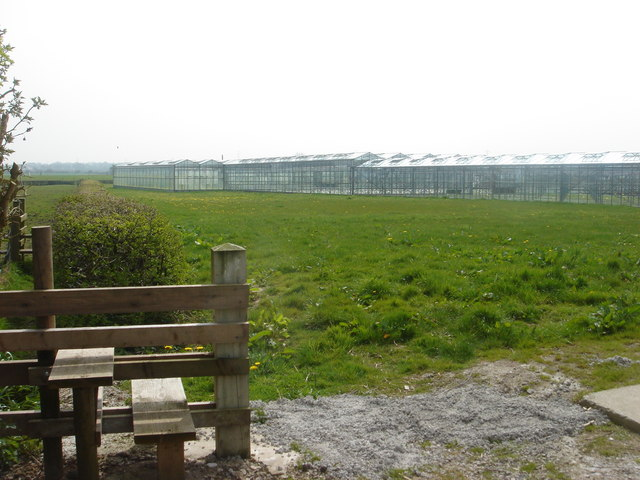
Public footpath near acres of greenhouses

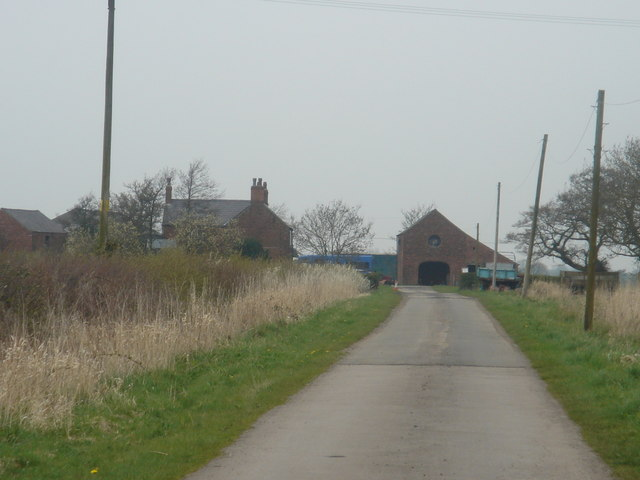
Long Fold Farm, Much Hoole

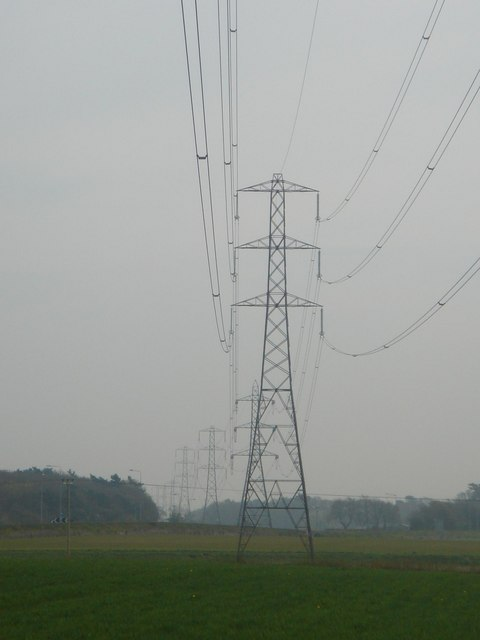
Pylons from Much Hoole to Bretherton

== See also ==
- Listed buildings in Much Hoole
