= Carr House, Bretherton =

Listed building in Lancashire, England

Carr House
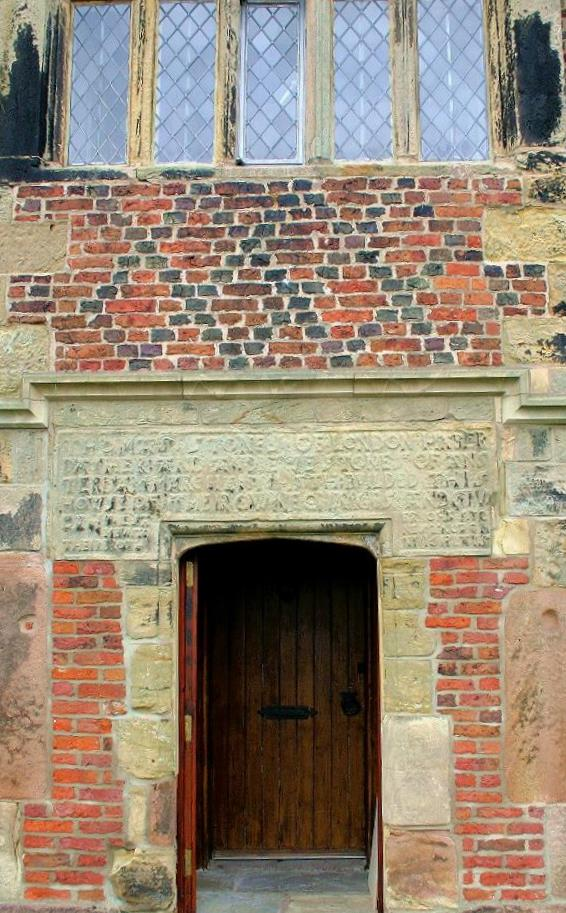
- Carr House porch, with the inscription above the door

- Location within the Borough of Chorley

General information
- Architectural style: Jacobean
- Location: Bretherton, England
- Coordinates: 53.6869°N 2.8150°W
- Year built: 1613
- Client: Thomas Stone

Technical details
- Material: Brick

Listed Building – Grade II*
- Official name: Carr House
- Designated: 22 October 1952
- Reference no.: 1163160

Carr House is a 17th-century house within the Bank Hall Estate, half-way between the villages of Tarleton and Much Hoole at the extreme north-west of the village of Bretherton, Lancashire, England. The building faces south to the Bretherton road, from which it stands back some distance, and has a foreyard inclosed on the west side by farm buildings.

== The Stone family ==
Carr House is the ancestral home of the Stone family. The house was built in 1613 by Thomas Stone, a haberdasher from London, and his brother Andrew, a merchant from Amsterdam.

The local church of St Michael was built in 1628 and was a gift to the people of the local villages of Croston, Much Hoole and Bretherton by Thomas and Andrew, who also built a manor house for the rector of St Michael's. John gave the church its font and his wife donated the silver goblets and plate that are still used in the church today for communion.

Andrew shipped goods to England via Hoole and Richard Stone imported Irish panel boards and timber in 1604 for the Shuttleworth family, who were then building Gawthorpe Hall, with 1,000 pieces, storing them until needed in Hoole's tithe barn.

== Architecture ==
The house was built in 1613 and has two wings to each side of a central porch. The building is built of red bricks which have weathered over the centuries, with a blue-brick diaper pattern similar to work of the same period at Bank Hall, Hoole Church and Rufford Old Hall, with stone quoins of irregular length. Externally the building has not been altered very much since construction, as all the old stone mullioned windows remain as they are, therefore the brick work is unaltered. Blue slates cover the roof instead of the usual stone slabs which can be found on most of the old brick houses in Lancashire from this time period. The porch is the main feature of the front, being centrally situated, and rising to the third-storey attic space.

There are ten windows on the front facade, four on the ground floor, five on the first, and one in the attic, with hood moulds; all have four panes of leaded glass, except those over the porch, which have five. Between the upper and lower windows are four vertical cuts in the brickwork which are now filled in with plaster/cement; the history behind them is said to have been a partial evasion of the window tax, the argument being that the upper and lower windows are connected, therefore counting as one. An inscription in raised letters on the stone head of the doorway reads: Thomas Stones of London haberdasher and Andrewe Stones of Amsterdam merchant hath builded this howse of their owne charges and giveth the same unto their brother John Stones: Ano domni 1613. Laus.

The inscription is divided towards the end by the head of the doorway breaking into it. The walls of the upper rooms are stated to have been formerly panelled in oak, but the panelling is said to have been removed to Bank Hall in 1832 when that building was renovated.

An important feature of the house is a rare cage newel staircase; four inner newel posts rise to the full height of the stairwell without interruption.

== Jeremiah Horrocks ==
The astronomer Jeremiah Horrocks made the first recorded observation of the transit of Venus, on 24 November 1639, from the room above the porch while living at Carr House as the guest and lodger of Mr. Stone. It is also believed that Horrocks was the tutor to the Stone family's children.

== Dolls Museum ==
Carr House was once home to a Dolls Museum that housed the Barry Elder Collection. The collection is now in the Judges' Lodgings Museum in Lancaster. The building is a private residence again.

== See also ==
- Grade II* listed buildings in Lancashire
- Listed buildings in Bretherton
