= Jeremiah Horrocks =

English astronomer (1618–1641)

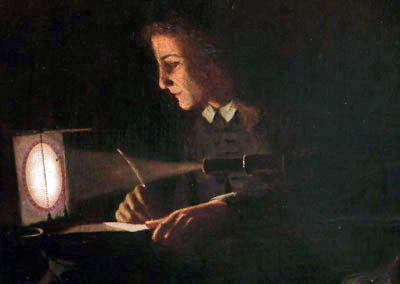
- Romanticised Victorian painting of Horrocks making the first observation of the transit of Venus in 1639. No contemporary portraits of Horrocks survive.
- Born: 1618; Lower Lodge, Otterspool, Toxteth Park, Liverpool, Lancashire, England
- Died: 3 January 1641 (aged 22); Toxteth Park, Liverpool, Lancashire, England
- Education: University of Cambridge
- Known for: Transit of Venus; Tides; Elliptical orbit Lunar orbit
- Scientific career
- Fields: Astronomy; Mathematics; Mechanics

Jeremiah Horrocks (1618 – 3 January 1641), sometimes given as Jeremiah Horrox (the Latinised version that he used on the Emmanuel College register and in his Latin manuscripts), was an English astronomer. He was the first person to demonstrate that the Moon moved around the Earth in an elliptical orbit; and he was the only person to predict the transit of Venus of 1639, an event which he and his friend William Crabtree were the only two people to observe and record. Most remarkably, Horrocks correctly asserted that Jupiter was accelerating in its orbit while Saturn was slowing and interpreted this as due to mutual gravitational interaction, thereby demonstrating that gravity's actions were not limited to the Earth, Sun, and Moon.

His early death and the chaos of the English Civil War nearly caused the loss to science of his treatise on the transit, Venus in sole visa; but for this and his other work he is acknowledged as one of the founding fathers of British astronomy.

== Early life and education ==
Jeremiah Horrocks was born at Lower Lodge Farm in Toxteth Park, a former royal deer park near Liverpool, Lancashire. His father James had moved to Toxteth Park to be apprenticed to Thomas Aspinwall, a watchmaker, and subsequently married his master's daughter Mary. Both families were well educated Puritans; the Horrocks sent their younger sons to the University of Cambridge and the Aspinwalls favoured Oxford. For their unorthodox beliefs the Puritans were excluded from public office, which tended to push them towards other callings; by 1600 the Aspinwalls had become a successful family of watchmakers. Jeremiah was introduced early to astronomy; his boyhood chores included measuring the local noon used to set local clocks, and his Puritan upbringing instilled an enduring suspicion of astrology, witchcraft and magic.

In 1632, Horrocks matriculated at Emmanuel College at the University of Cambridge as a sizar. At Cambridge he associated with the mathematician John Wallis and the platonist John Worthington. At that time he was one of only a few at Cambridge to accept Copernicus's revolutionary heliocentric theory, and he studied the works of Johannes Kepler, Tycho Brahe and others.

In 1635, for reasons not clear, Horrocks left Cambridge without graduating. Marston suggests that he may have needed to defer the extra cost this entailed until he was employed, whilst Aughton speculates that he may have failed his exams due to concentrating too much on his own interests, or that he did not want to take Anglican orders, and so a degree was of limited use to him.

== Astronomical observations ==
Now committed to the study of astronomy, Horrocks began to collect astronomical books and equipment; by 1638 he owned the best telescope he could find. Liverpool was a seafaring town so navigational instruments such as the astrolabe and cross staff were easy to find. But there was no market for the very specialised astronomical instruments he needed, so his only option was to make his own. He was well placed to do this; his father and uncles were watchmakers with expertise in creating precise instruments. Apparently he helped with the family business by day and, in return, the watchmakers in his family supported his vocation by assisting in the design and construction of instruments to study the stars at night.

Horrocks owned a three-foot radius astronomicus – a cross staff with movable sights used to measure the angle between two stars – but by January 1637 he had reached the limitations of this instrument and so built a larger and higher precision version. While a youth he read most of the astronomical treatises of his day and marked their weaknesses; by the age of seventeen he was suggesting new lines of research.

Tradition has it that after he left home he supported himself by holding a curacy in Much Hoole, near Preston in Lancashire, but there is little evidence for this. According to local tradition in Much Hoole, he lived at Carr House, within the Bank Hall Estate, Bretherton. Carr House was a substantial property owned by the Stones family who were prosperous farmers and merchants, and Horrocks was probably a tutor for the Stones' children.

== Lunar research ==
Horrocks was the first to demonstrate that the Moon moved in an elliptical path around the Earth, and he posited that comets followed elliptical orbits. He supported his theories by analogy to the motions of a conical pendulum, noting that after a plumb bob was drawn back and released it followed an elliptical path, and that its major axis rotated in the direction of revolution as did the apsides of the Moon's orbit. He anticipated Isaac Newton in suggesting the influence of the Sun as well as the Earth on the Moon's orbit. In the Principia Newton acknowledged Horrocks's work in relation to his theory of lunar motion. In the final months of his life Horrocks made detailed studies of tides in attempting to explain the nature of lunar causation of tidal movements.

== Transit of Venus ==
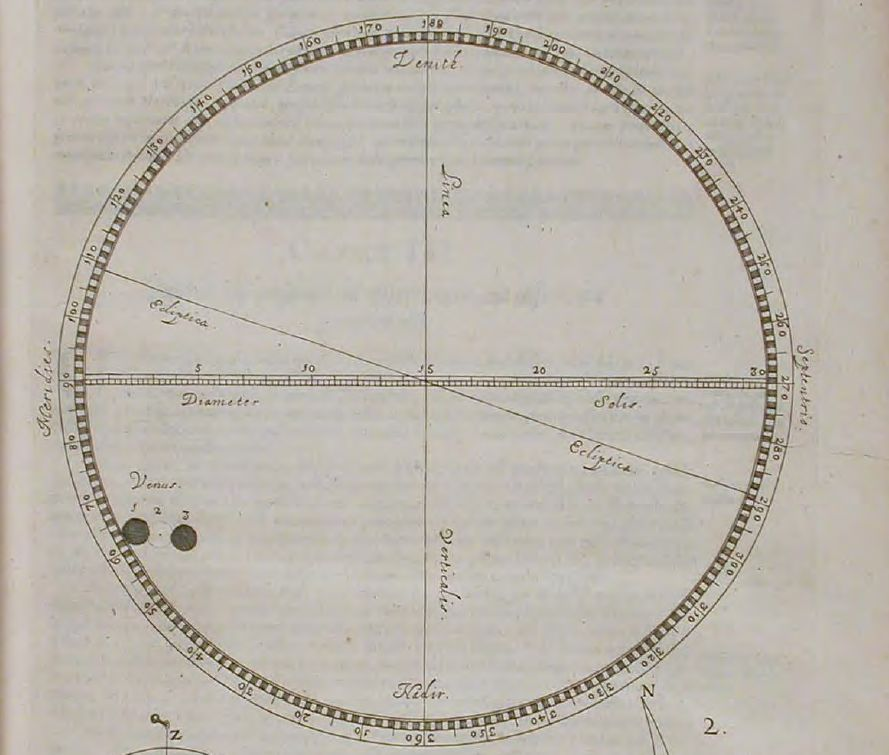
A representation of Horrocks's recording of the transit published in 1662 by Johannes Hevelius

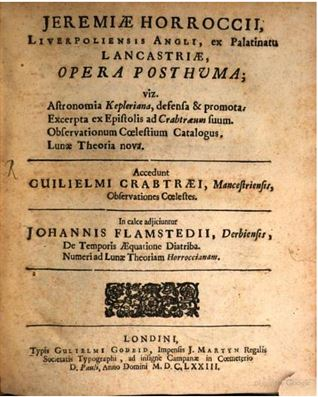
The title page of Jeremiah Horrocks's Opera Posthuma, published by the Royal Society in 1672.

Johannes Kepler had published his Rudolphine Tables in 1627. Two years later he published extracts from the tables in his pamphlet De raris mirisque Anni 1631, which included an admonitio ad astronomos (warning to astronomers) concerning a transit of Mercury in 1631 and transits of Venus in 1631 and 1761. Horrocks's own observations, combined with those of his friend and correspondent William Crabtree, had convinced him that Kepler's Rudolphine tables, although more accurate than the commonly used tables produced by Philip Van Lansberg, were still in need of some correction. Kepler's tables had predicted a near-miss of a transit of Venus in 1639 but, having made his own observations of Venus for years, Horrocks predicted a transit would indeed occur.

Horrocks made a simple helioscope by focusing the image of the Sun through a telescope onto a plane surface, whereby an image of the Sun could be safely observed. From his location in Much Hoole he calculated the transit would begin at approximately 3:00 pm on 24 November 1639, Julian calendar (or 4 December in the Gregorian calendar). The weather was cloudy but he first observed the tiny black shadow of Venus crossing the Sun at about 3:15 pm; and he continued to observe for half an hour until the Sun set. The 1639 transit was also observed by William Crabtree from his home in Broughton near Manchester.

Horrocks's observations allowed him to make a well-informed guess as to the size of Venus—previously thought to be larger and closer to Earth—and to estimate the distance between the Earth and the Sun, now known as the astronomical unit (AU). His figure of 95 million kilometres (59 million miles, 0.63 AU) was far from the 150 million kilometres (93 million miles) known today, but it was more accurate than any suggested up to that time.

A treatise by Horrocks on the study of the transit, Venus in sole visa (Venus seen on the Sun), was later published by the Polish astronomer Johannes Hevelius at his own expense; it caused great excitement when revealed to members of the Royal Society in 1662, some 20 years after it was written. It presented Horrocks's enthusiastic and romantic nature, including humorous comments and passages of original poetry. When speaking of the century separating Venusian transits, he rhapsodised:

" ...Thy return
Posterity shall witness; years must roll
Away, but then at length the splendid sight
Again shall greet our distant children's eyes."

It was a time of great uncertainty in astronomy, when the world's astronomers could not agree amongst themselves and theologians fulminated against claims that contradicted Scripture. Horrocks, although a pious young man, came down firmly on the side of scientific determinism.

It is wrong to hold the most noble Science of the Stars guilty of uncertainty on account of some people's uncertain observations. Through no fault of its own it suffers these complaints which arise from the uncertainty and error not of the celestial motions but of human observations . . . I do not consider that any imperfections in the motions of the stars have so far been detected, nor do I believe that they are ever to be found. Far be it from me to allow that God has created the heavenly bodies more imperfectly than man has observed them. – Jeremiah Horrocks

== Death ==
Horrocks returned to Toxteth Park sometime in mid-1640 and died suddenly from unknown causes on 3 January 1641, at the age of 22. As expressed by Crabtree, "What an incalculable loss!" He has been described as a bridge which connected Newton with Copernicus, Galileo, Brahe and Kepler.

It is believed that Horrocks was buried at Toxteth Unitarian Chapel, but there is seemingly no proof of this.

== Legacy ==
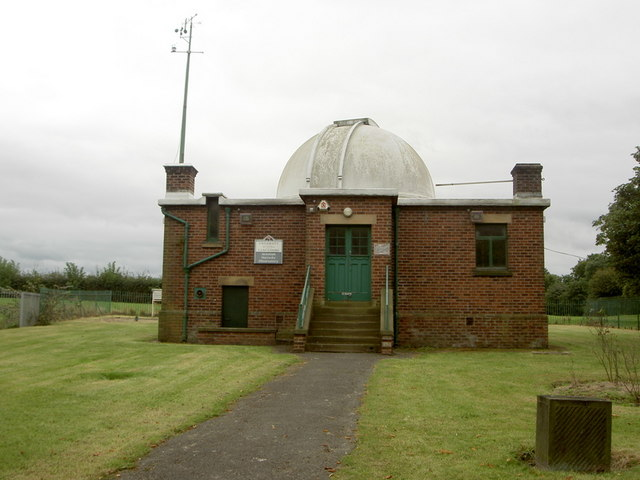
Jeremiah Horrocks Observatory on Moor Park, Preston

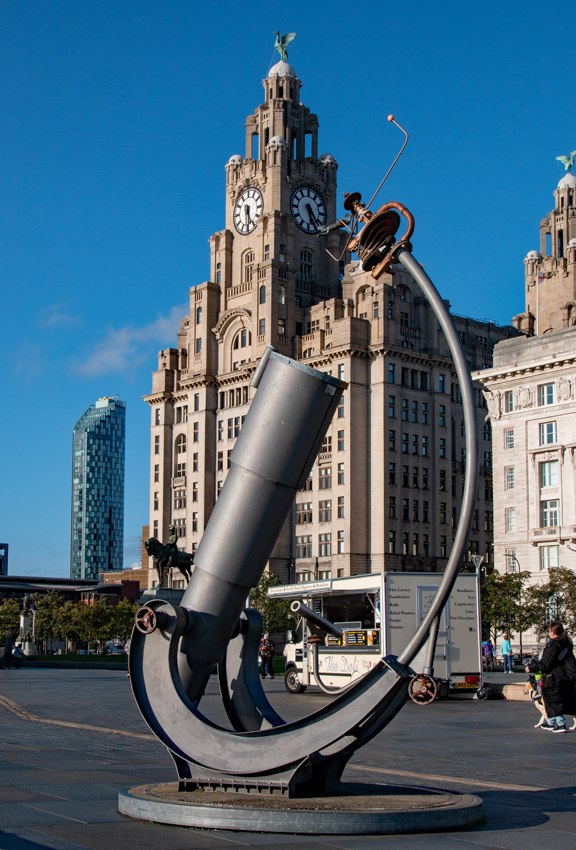
Sculpture commemorating Horrocks at the Pier Head, Liverpool

Horrocks is remembered on a plaque in Westminster Abbey and the lunar crater Horrocks is named after him. In 1859, a marble tablet and stained-glass windows commemorating him were installed in the Parish Church of St Michael, Much Hoole. Toxteth Unitarian Chapel contains a memorial plaque commemorating his achievements. Horrocks Avenue in Garston, Liverpool, is also named after him.

In 1927, the Jeremiah Horrocks Observatory was built at Moor Park, Preston.

The 2012 transit of Venus was marked by a celebration held in the church at Much Hoole, which was streamed live worldwide on the NASA website.

Horrocks and the transit of Venus feature in an episode ("Dark Matter") of the British television series Lewis.

In 2011, a sculpture by Andy Plant, titled Heaven and Earth, was installed at the Pier Head in Liverpool to celebrate Horrocks's work on the transit of Venus. It consists of a telescope looking at a working orrery which has the planet Venus replaced by a figure of the astronomer depicted as an angel.

In 2023 a new play, Horrox on Horrocks's short life and overlooked achievements, by playwright David Sear, was staged in Cambridge’s ADC Theatre from 28 March to 1 April as part of the Cambridge festival.

=== Jeremiah Horrocks Institute ===
The Jeremiah Horrocks Institute for Astrophysics and Supercomputing was established in 1993 at the University of Central Lancashire. In 2012 it was renamed the Jeremiah Horrocks Institute for Mathematics, Physics, and Astronomy.

== Bibliography ==
- Aughton, Peter (2004). The Transit of Venus: The Brief, Brilliant Life of Jeremiah Horrocks, Father of British Astronomy. London: Weidenfeld & Nicolson. ISBN 0-297-84721-X.
- Clerke, Agnes Mary (1891). "Horrocks, Jeremiah" . In Lee, Sidney (ed.). Dictionary of National Biography. Vol. 27. London: Smith, Elder & Co. p. 373-375.
