= Statue of Joseph Henry =

Statue by William Wetmore Story in Washington, D.C., U.S.

- Professor Joseph Henry
- U.S. Historic district – Contributing property
- D.C. Inventory of Historic Sites
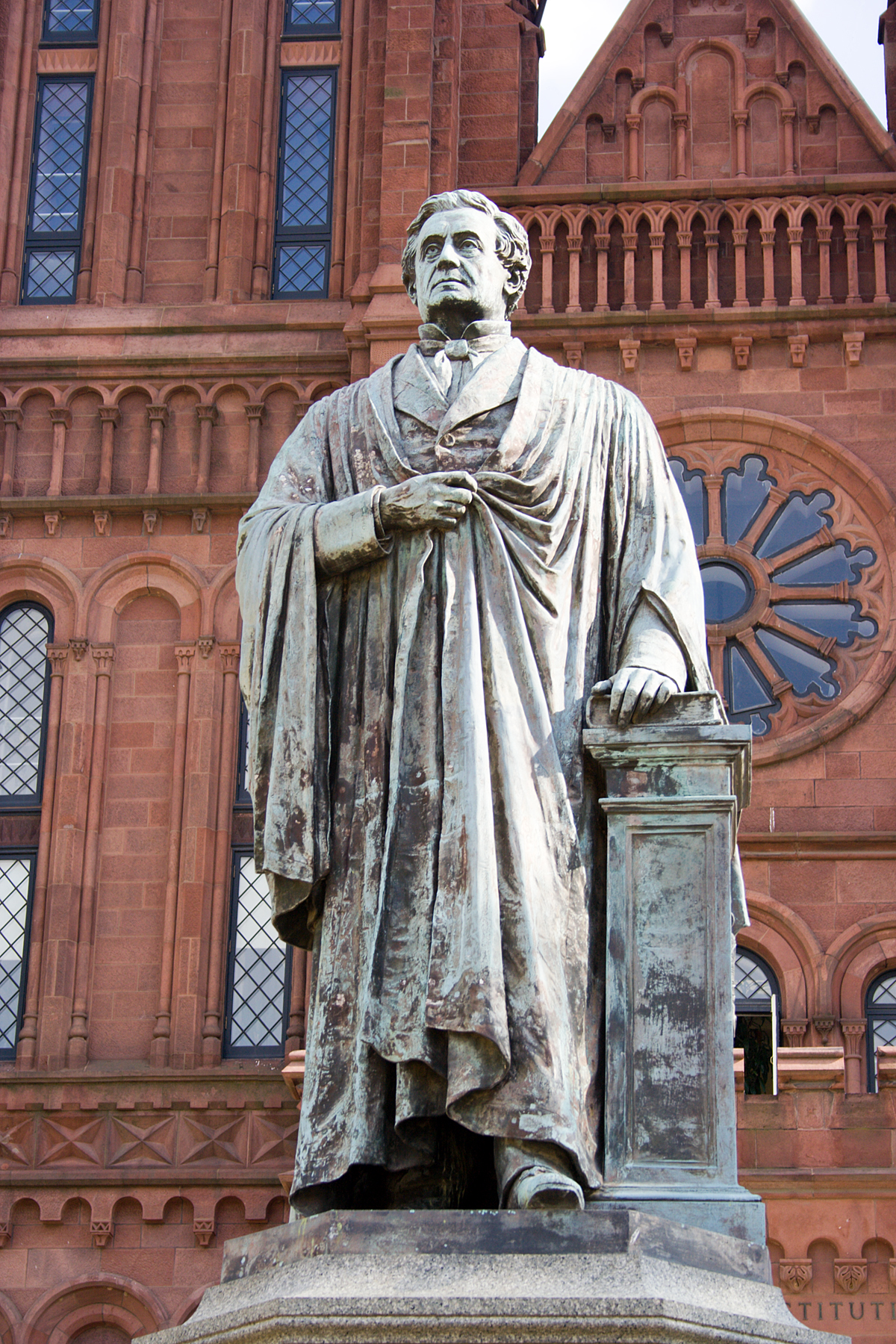
- Statue of Joseph Henry
- Location: Jefferson Drive SW; Washington, D.C., U.S.
- Coordinates: 38°53′21″N 77°01′34″W
- Built: 1883
- Architect: William Wetmore Story
- Part of: National Mall (66000031); L'Enfant Plan (97000332)

Significant dates
- Designated CP: October 15, 1966 (National Mall); April 24, 1997 (L'Enfant Plan)
- Designated DCIHS: November 8, 1964 (National Mall); January 19, 1971 (L'Enfant Plan)

Professor Joseph Henry, also known as the Joseph Henry Memorial, is an outdoor bronze sculpture depicting scientist Joseph Henry, the first president of the Smithsonian Institution. The statue stands in front of the Smithsonian Institution Building in Washington, D.C., facing the National Mall. It was sculpted by artist William Wetmore Story, and dedicated in 1883, a few years after Henry's death. The bronze statue and granite base were unveiled in front of thousands of onlookers and invited guests. Speeches at the dedication included one from Chief Justice of the Supreme Court Morrison Waite, and the president of Yale College, Noah Porter.

The statue originally stood northwest of the Smithsonian Institution Building, but it was moved in 1934 when the National Mall was reconfigured. In 1965, the statue was turned around so that Henry faces the Mall. He did not like the Smithsonian Institution Building, even though he and family lived there for more than two decades. The statue is a contributing property to the National Mall Historic District and the L'Enfant Plan, both listed on the National Register of Historic Places and the District of Columbia Inventory of Historic Sites.

== History ==
=== Biography ===
Joseph Henry was born in 1797 in Albany, New York. His childhood included poverty and the death of his father. In response, Henry lived with relatives for much of his early life. He worked as an apprentice to a watchmaker and silversmith, but Henry's real passion during that time was acting. Before attempting that as a profession, he read Lectures on Experimental Philosophy, Astronomy, and Chemistry by George Gregory. Henry enrolled in The Albany Academy and graduated in 1822. He returned to the academy in 1828 as a teacher of mathematics and natural philosophy. While a student at the academy, Henry married his cousin, Harriet Alexander.

In 1832, Henry was offered a job as professor of natural philosophy at the College of New Jersey, later renamed Princeton University. While there, he not only taught classes covering multiple subjects, Henry published scientific articles, including topics on electromagnetism and astrophysics. During a European tour in 1837, Henry met many scientists, which increased his notability in the field of science.

Beginning in 1846, Henry served as the Smithsonian Institution's first president. He and his family moved to Washington, D.C., but they did not like the condition of the city at that time nor the weather. Nevertheless, Henry stayed because he thought it was important for the public to learn about science and for others to perform scholarly research. In 1855, Henry and his family moved into the east wing of the Smithsonian Institution Building, a building which he disliked.

During his years in Washington, D.C., Henry continued writing and founded the Smithsonian Contributions to Knowledge, which still publishes periodical publications on various topics. He was assigned to work on a committee of the United States Lighthouse Board, helping oversee tests on oils and other items related to lighthouses.

His assistance in the Civil War included providing hot air balloons to the Union Army for reconnaissance purposes. Henry's other professional contributions included helping create the National Academy of Sciences, where he served as president, as well as the precursor to the National Weather Service. He continued working until his death in 1878, with some of his mentees being Samuel Morse and Alexander Graham Bell.

=== Memorial plans ===
Soon after Henry's death, there were plans for a memorial to be created in his honor. In 1879, U.S. Senator Newton Booth introduced a resolution that would allocate $20,000 for Henry's memorial. After U.S. Senator Justin S. Morrill sponsored a bill for erection of the memorial, an Act of Congress passed on June 6, 1880, allocating $15,000 for a bronze statue and granite base. The act also named William Wetmore Story as the sculptor and a contract was signed with him on December 8, 1880. Story used a death mask created by Clark Mills for the statue.

==== Dedication ====
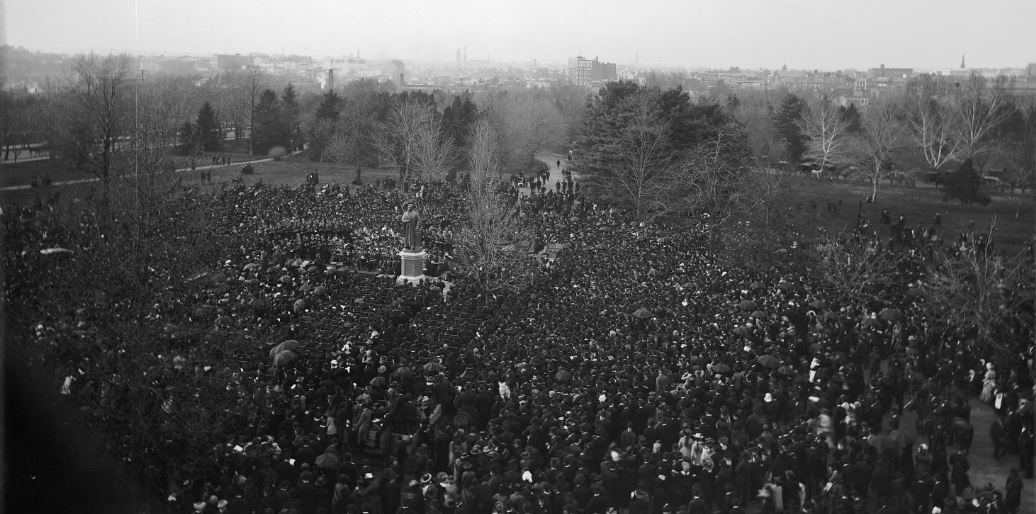
People gathered on the National Mall to watch the statue's unveiling in 1883

The unveiling and dedication ceremony for Henry's statue took place at 4pm on April 19, 1883. A temporary stand with seating for 1,500 people was built around the statue, but there were many more onlookers that day, filling the area between the building and statue. There were three chairs on a platform directly beside the statue, reserved for the three speakers. The statue and base were both tightly covered by a large cloth, not allowing anyone a peak before the unveiling.

The event began with guests of honor walking from the museum to the statue. As they walked, the United States Marine Band played the Transit of Venus March. The speakers sitting in the three seats on stage were Chief Justice of the Supreme Court Morrison Waite, president of Yale College Noah Porter, and Reverend Archibald Alexander Hodge. The band, led by John Philip Sousa, then played a portion of Messiah followed by an opening prayer by Hodge. Waite then gave a speech about Henry's life and accomplishments. After he spoke, the statue was unveiled, and the entire crowd cheered. The band then performed a portion of The Creation, which was followed by a lengthy speech from Porter. After he was finished, the band played two more songs, and the ceremony ended.

=== Later history ===
The statue was designed a contributing property to the National Mall Historic District, listed on the District of Columbia Inventory of Historic Sites (DCIHS) on November 8, 1964, and the National Register of Historic Places (NRHP) on October 15, 1966. The historic district was later expanded in 2016. The statue is also a contributing property to the L'Enfant Plan, and was added to the DCIHS on January 19, 1971, and the NRHP on April 24, 1997. Henry's statue, along with the Washington National Cathedral and the Lincoln Memorial, was vandalized in 2013 with green paint left on the base. The paint on the memorial was removed by the following month.

== Location and design ==
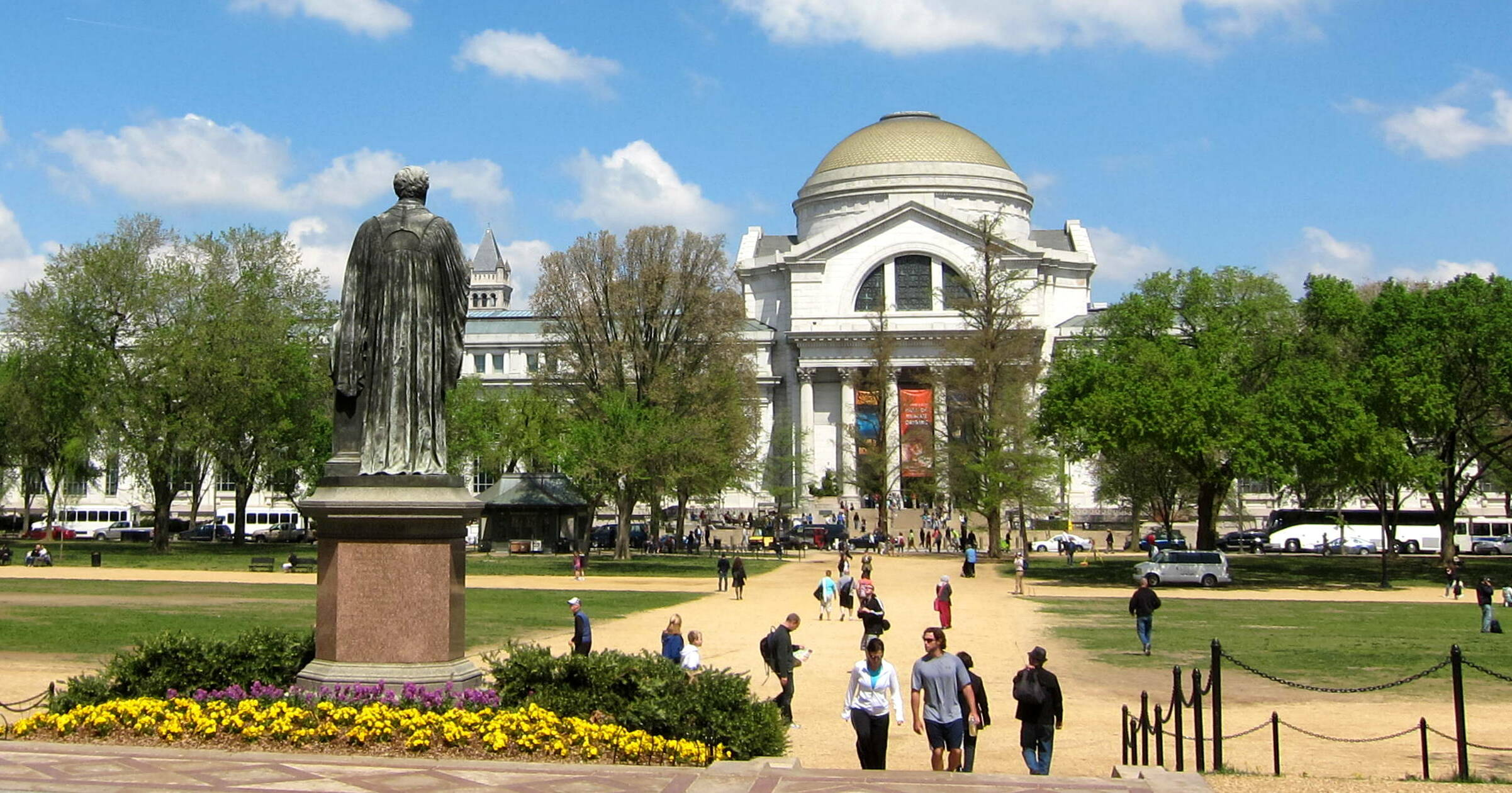
The statue facing north across the Mall

The statue is sited on the north side of the Smithsonian Institution Building, between Jefferson Drive NW and the building. It was originally located 150 feet (46 m) northwest of the building, but when the National Mall was reconfigured in 1934, the statue was moved to line up directly with the building's entrance. For many years, the statue faced the building. Smithsonian leader Sidney Dillon Ripley had the statue turned around on May 24, 1965, so that Henry would be facing the National Mall.

The bronze statue is 9-feet (2.7 m) tall and was made in Rome, where Story often lived. The octagonal base was made in the U.S. from red and gray granite. Henry is depicted standing next to a pedestal, wearing a vest and long coat, and placing his left hand on a book. The pedestal is decorated with a horseshoe magnet bound with insulated wire.

== See also ==
- Joseph Henry Memorial
- List of public art in Washington, D.C., Ward 2
- Outdoor sculpture in Washington, D.C.
