= Mary Henry =

Mary Henry may refer to:

- Mary Henry (doctor) (born 1940), Irish doctor and independent Senator
- Mary Henry (artist) (1913–2009), American artist
- Mary Gibson Henry (1884–1967), American botanist
- Mary Kay Henry (born 1958), American labor union activist
- Mary Anna Henry (1834–1903), American diarist
