= Stephen Alexander (astronomer) =

American astronomer and educator

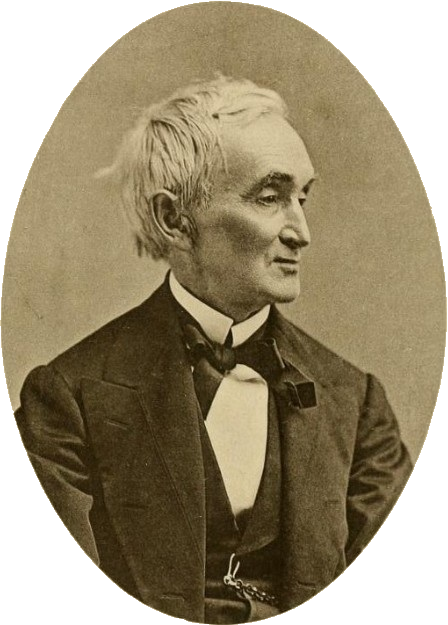
- Born: September 1, 1806; Schenectady, New York, US
- Died: June 25, 1883 (aged 76); Princeton, New Jersey, US
- Education: Union College; Princeton Theological Seminary
- Occupations: astronomer and educator
- Notable work: Statement and Exposition of Certain Harmonies of the Solar System; Fundamental Principles of Mathematics
- Scientific career
- Fields: astronomy mathematics
- Institutions: Princeton University

Signature
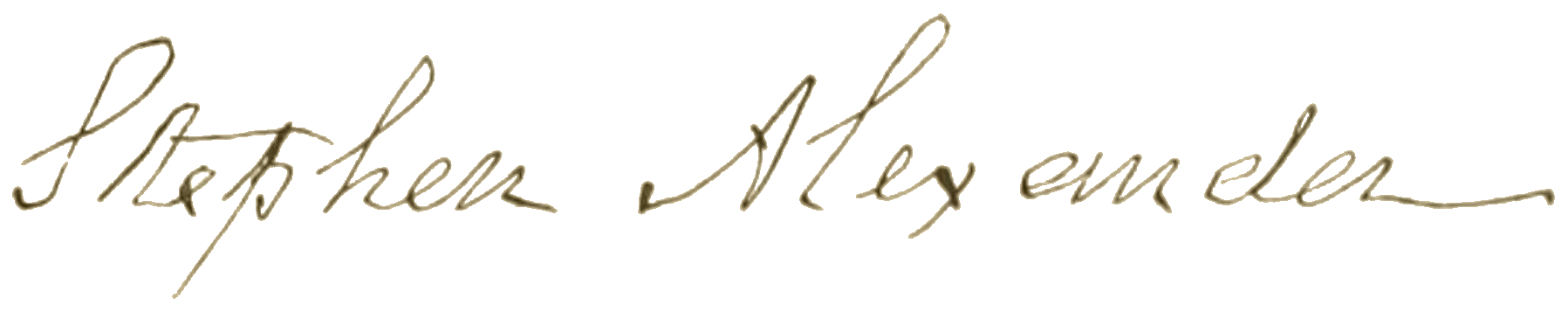

Stephen Alexander (September 1, 1806 – June 25, 1883) was an American astronomer and educator.

== Early years ==
He was born in Schenectady, New York, on September 1, 1806. He was the brother-in-law of Joseph Henry, the first secretary of the Smithsonian, and worked closely with him. His education was obtained at Union College, where he graduated in 1824, and at Princeton Theological Seminary, where he graduated in 1832.

== Career ==
He became a tutor in mathematics at Princeton University in 1832; he would later become professor of astronomy and mathematics and advocate for the construction of Princeton's first observatory. Alexander relied on the assistance of a free African American man named Alfred Scudder, who worked for him at Princeton during the 1850s. Because of his role as Alexander's assistant on campus, Scudder received the nickname "Assistant Professor of Natural Philosophy" from students.

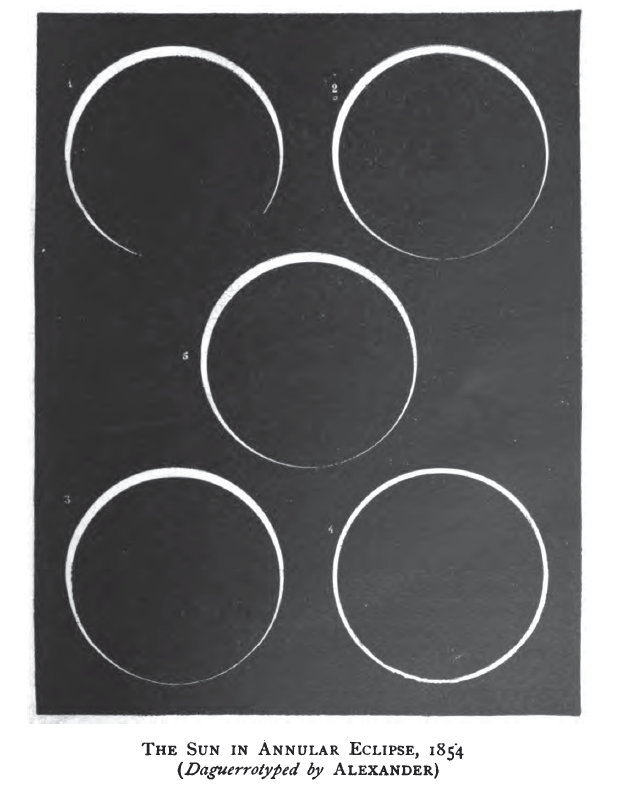
The solar eclipse on May 28, 1854. Annular Daguerreotyped by Stephen Alexander.

Alexander was elected a member of the American Philosophical Society in 1839 and an Associate Fellow of the American Academy of Arts and Sciences in 1850. In 1860, he was the head of an expedition to the coast of Labrador to observe the solar eclipse which occurred July 18 of that year, and later to observe the one of 1869.

He was one of the original members of the National Academy of Sciences in 1862, and a member of the American Philosophical Society, and the American Association for the Advancement of Science. He also served as the president of this last organization in 1859. His principal writings are "Physical Phenomena attendant upon Solar Eclipses", read before the American Philosophical Society in 1848; a paper on the "Fundamental Principles of Mathematics," read before the American Association for the Advancement of Science in 1848; another on the "Origin of the Forms and the Present Condition of some of the Clusters of Stars and several of the Nebulae", read before the American Association in 1850; others on the "Form and Equatorial Diameter of the Asteroid Planets" and "Harmonies in the Arrangement of the Solar System which seem to be Confirmatory of the Nebular Hypothesis of Laplace", presented to the National Academy of Science; and a "Statement and Exposition of Certain Harmonies of the Solar System", which was published by the Smithsonian Institution in 1875.

== Works ==
Among many noteworthy astronomical papers he published:

- Fundamental Principles of Mathematics
- Statement and Exposition of Certain Harmonies of the Solar System
