= USLHT Joseph Henry =

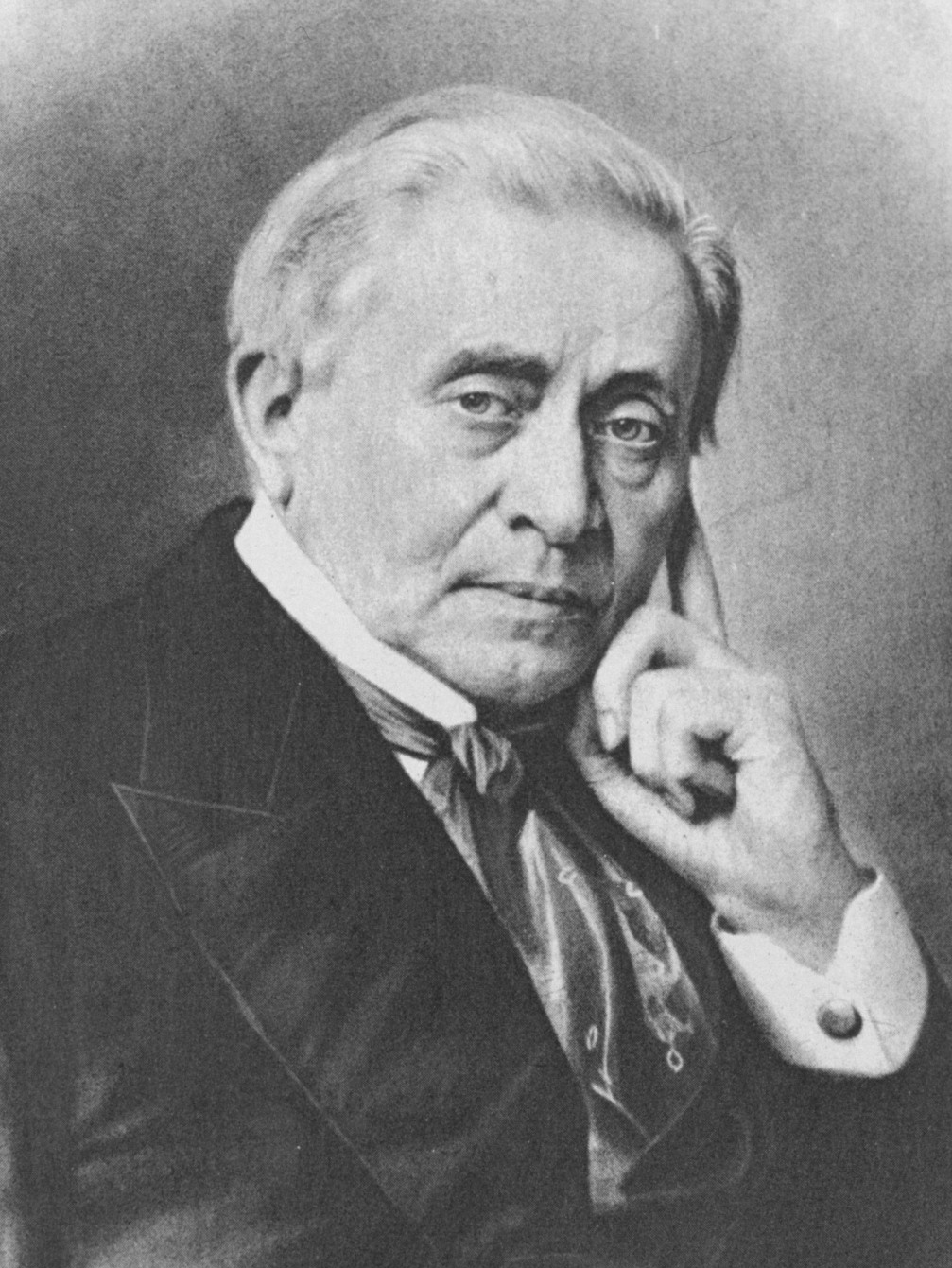
Joseph Henry in the 1870s

The United States Lighthouse Tender Joseph Henry was a lighthouse tender that operated from 1880 to 1904 primarily on the Mississippi and Missouri Rivers. This steamboat was built by James Howard's company in Jeffersonville, Indiana, at his shipyards on the Ohio river in 1880.

The steamer was named after scientist Joseph Henry and was based in Memphis. Henry was a member of the U.S. Lighthouse Board (1852–78), and was responsible for various improvements in lighting and signaling to lighthouses. The boat was named for Henry two years after his death.

The Joseph Henry's primary purpose was to bring supplies, fuel and maintenance crew to the various inland and coastal lighthouses as well as perform maintenance on buoys and markers.

In 1892 Cook Hoyle was selected as the Captain of the Joseph Henry. His first assignment was to take it to St. Louis for repairs and bring it back to Memphis in time for the celebration of the opening of the Frisco Bridge.

On 15 June 1897 one of her Firemen, Win Barnes, actually doing the work of a striker, fell overboard and drowned near Columbus, Kentucky.

The most famous captain was Thomas B. Good who took over after 1900. In 1903 the Joseph Henry was sold to the Bluff City Excursion Company and renamed Louisiana. Now primarily used for excursions along the Mississippi out of Memphis, it was sold again in 1906 and renamed Pattona. It wrecked and sank near Memphis in 1914.
