= Joseph Henry =

American physicist and inventor (1797–1878)

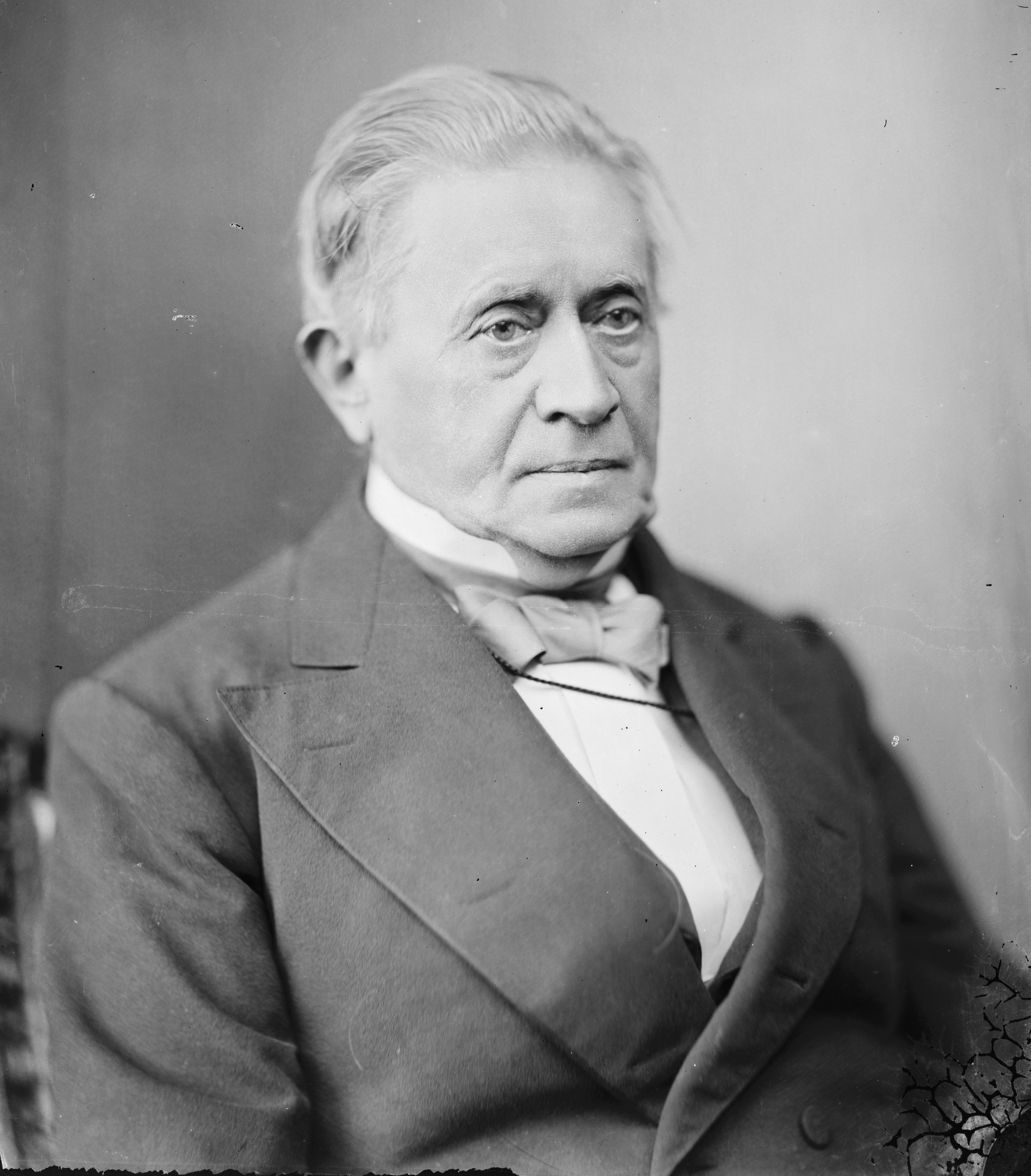
- Henry, c. 1865–1878

2nd President of the National Academy of Sciences
- In office 1868–1878
- Preceded by: Alexander Dallas Bache
- Succeeded by: William Barton Rogers

1st Secretary of the Smithsonian Institution
- In office 1846–1878
- Preceded by: Office established
- Succeeded by: Spencer Fullerton Baird

Personal details
- Born: December 17, 1797 Albany, New York, U.S.
- Died: May 13, 1878 (aged 80) Washington, D.C., U.S.
- Resting place: Oak Hill Cemetery, Washington, D.C.
- Scientific career
- Monuments: Professor Joseph Henry, Washington, D.C.
- Education: Albany Academy
- Known for: Improving the electromagnet (1830); Inventing the electric doorbell (1831); Inventing the relay (1835)
- Spouse: Harriet Alexander
- Children: 4, including Mary
- Fields: Physics
- Workplaces: Albany Academy (1826–1832); College of New Jersey (1832–1846)

Signature
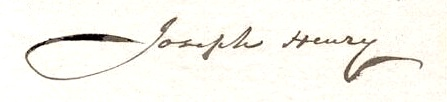

Joseph Henry (December 17, 1797– May 13, 1878) was an American physicist and inventor who served as the first secretary of the Smithsonian Institution. He was the secretary for the National Institute for the Promotion of Science, a precursor of the Smithsonian Institution. He also served as president of the National Academy of Sciences from 1868 to 1878.

While building electromagnets, Henry discovered the electromagnetic phenomenon of self-inductance. He also discovered mutual inductance independently of Michael Faraday, though Faraday was the first to make the discovery and publish his results. Henry developed the electromagnet into a practical device. He invented a precursor to the electric doorbell (specifically a bell that could be rung at a distance via an electric wire, 1831) and electric relay (1835). His work on the electromagnetic relay was the basis of the practical electrical telegraph, invented separately by Samuel F. B. Morse and Sir Charles Wheatstone. In his honor, the SI unit of inductance is named the henry (plural: henries; symbol: H).

== Early life and education ==
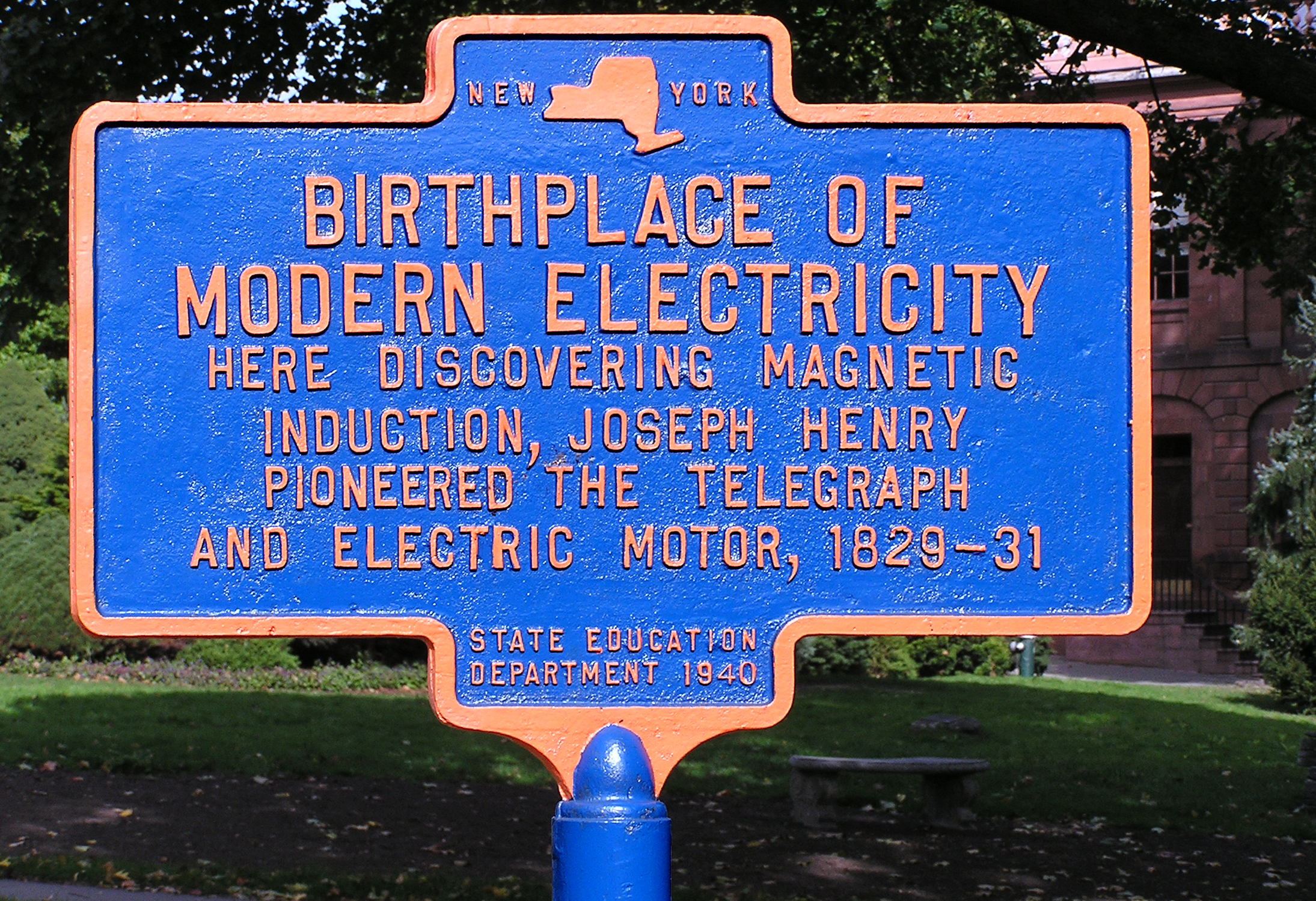
Historical marker in Academy Park in Albany commemorating Henry's work with electricity

Henry was born in Albany, New York, to Scottish immigrants Ann Alexander Henry and William Henry. His parents were poor, and Henry's father died while he was still young. For the rest of his childhood, Henry lived with his grandmother in Galway, New York. After school, he worked at a general store, and at the age of thirteen became an apprentice watchmaker and silversmith. Joseph's first love was theater, and he came close to becoming a professional actor. His interest in science was sparked at the age of sixteen by a book of lectures on scientific topics titled Popular Lectures on Experimental Philosophy.

In 1819, he entered The Albany Academy, where he was given free tuition. Even with free tuition, he was so poor that he had to support himself with teaching and private tutoring positions. He intended to go into medicine, but in 1824 he was appointed an assistant engineer for the survey of the State road being constructed between the Hudson River and Lake Erie. From then on, he was inspired to a career in either civil or mechanical engineering. Henry excelled academically, even often helping his teachers teach science.

== Career ==
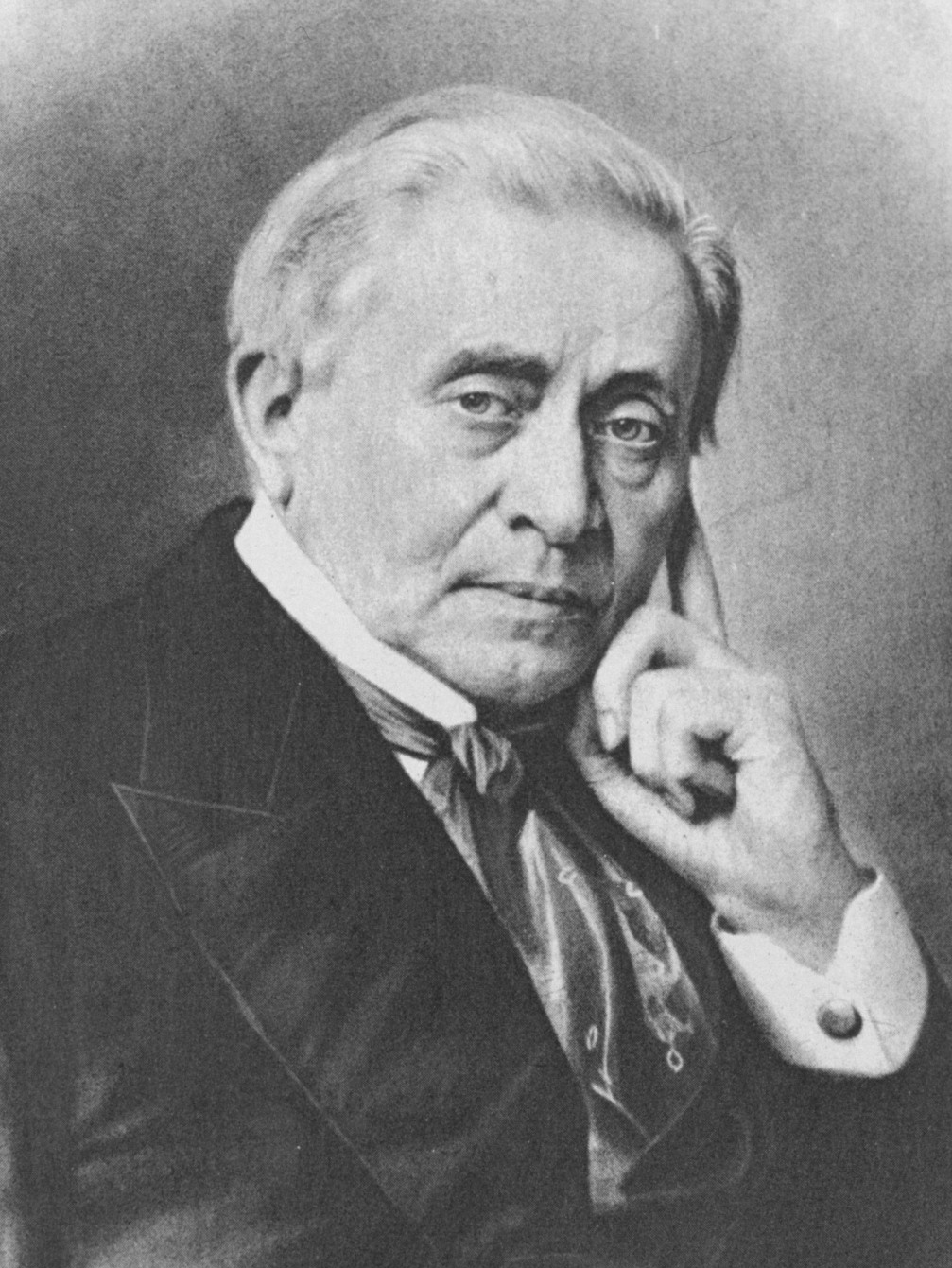
A portrait of Henry dated 1879

In 1826, he was appointed Professor of Mathematics and Natural Philosophy at The Albany Academy by Principal T. Romeyn Beck. Some of his most important research was conducted in this new position. His curiosity about terrestrial magnetism led him to experiment with magnetism in general. He was the first to coil insulated wire tightly around an iron core in order to make a more powerful electromagnet, improving on William Sturgeon's electromagnet which used loosely coiled uninsulated wire. Using this technique, he built the strongest electromagnet at the time, for Yale. He also showed that, when making an electromagnet using just two electrodes attached to a battery, it is best to wind several coils of wire in parallel, but when using a set-up with multiple batteries, there should be only one single long coil. The latter made the telegraph feasible. Because of his early experiments in electromagnetism, some historians credit Henry with discoveries pre-dating Faraday and Hertz; however, Henry is not credited due to not publishing his work.

Using his newly developed electromagnetic principle, in 1831, Henry created one of the first machines to use electromagnetism for motion. This was the earliest ancestor of modern DC motor. It did not make use of rotating motion, but was merely an electromagnet perched on a pole, rocking back and forth. The rocking motion was caused by one of the two leads on both ends of the magnet rocker touching one of the two battery cells, causing a polarity change, and rocking the opposite direction until the other two leads hit the other battery.

This apparatus allowed Henry to recognize the property of self inductance. British scientist Michael Faraday also recognized this property around the same time. Since Faraday published his results first, he became the officially recognized discoverer of the phenomenon.

=== Princeton ===
From 1832 to 1846, Henry served as the first Chair of Natural History at the College of New Jersey, which is now Princeton University. While in Princeton, he taught a wide range of courses including natural history, chemistry, and architecture, and ran a laboratory on campus. Decades later, Henry wrote that he made "several thousand original investigations on electricity, magnetism, and electro-magnetism" while on the Princeton faculty. Henry admired and acknowledged his African American personal assistant, Sam Parker, over the course of his laboratory and experimental work. Parker was a free black man hired by the Princeton trustees to assist Henry. In an 1841 letter to mathematician Elias Loomis, Henry wrote:

The Trustees have however furnished me with an article which I now find indispensable namely with a coloured servant whom I have taught to manage my batteries and who now relieves me from all the dirty work of the laboratory.

In his letters, Henry described Parker providing materials for experiments, fixing technical issues with Henry's equipment, and at times being used as a test subject in electrical experiments in which Henry and his students would shock Parker in classroom demonstrations. In 1842, when Parker fell ill, Henry's experiments stopped completely until he recovered.

=== Smithsonian ===
Henry was appointed the first Secretary of the Smithsonian Institution in 1846, and served in this capacity until 1878. In 1848, while Secretary, Henry worked in conjunction with Professor Stephen Alexander to determine the relative temperatures for different parts of the solar disk. They used a thermopile to determine that sunspots were cooler than the surrounding regions. This work was shown to the astronomer Angelo Secchi who extended it, but with some question as to whether Henry was given proper credit for his earlier work.

In late 1861 and early 1862, during the American Civil War, Henry oversaw a series of lectures by prominent abolitionists at the Smithsonian Institution. Speakers included white clergymen, politicians, and activists such as Wendell Phillips, Horace Greeley, Henry Ward Beecher, and Ralph Waldo Emerson. Orator and former fugitive slave Frederick Douglass was scheduled as the final speaker; Henry, however, refused to allow him to attend, stating: "I would not let the lecture of the coloured man be given in the rooms of the Smithsonian."

In the fall of 2014, history author Jeremy T.K. Farley released The Civil War Out My Window: Diary of Mary Henry. The 262-page book featured the detailed diary of Henry's daughter Mary Anna Henry, kept from the years of 1855 to 1878 while living in the Smithsonian Castle. Throughout the diary, Henry is repeatedly mentioned by his daughter, who showed a keen affection to her father.

=== Influences in aeronautics ===
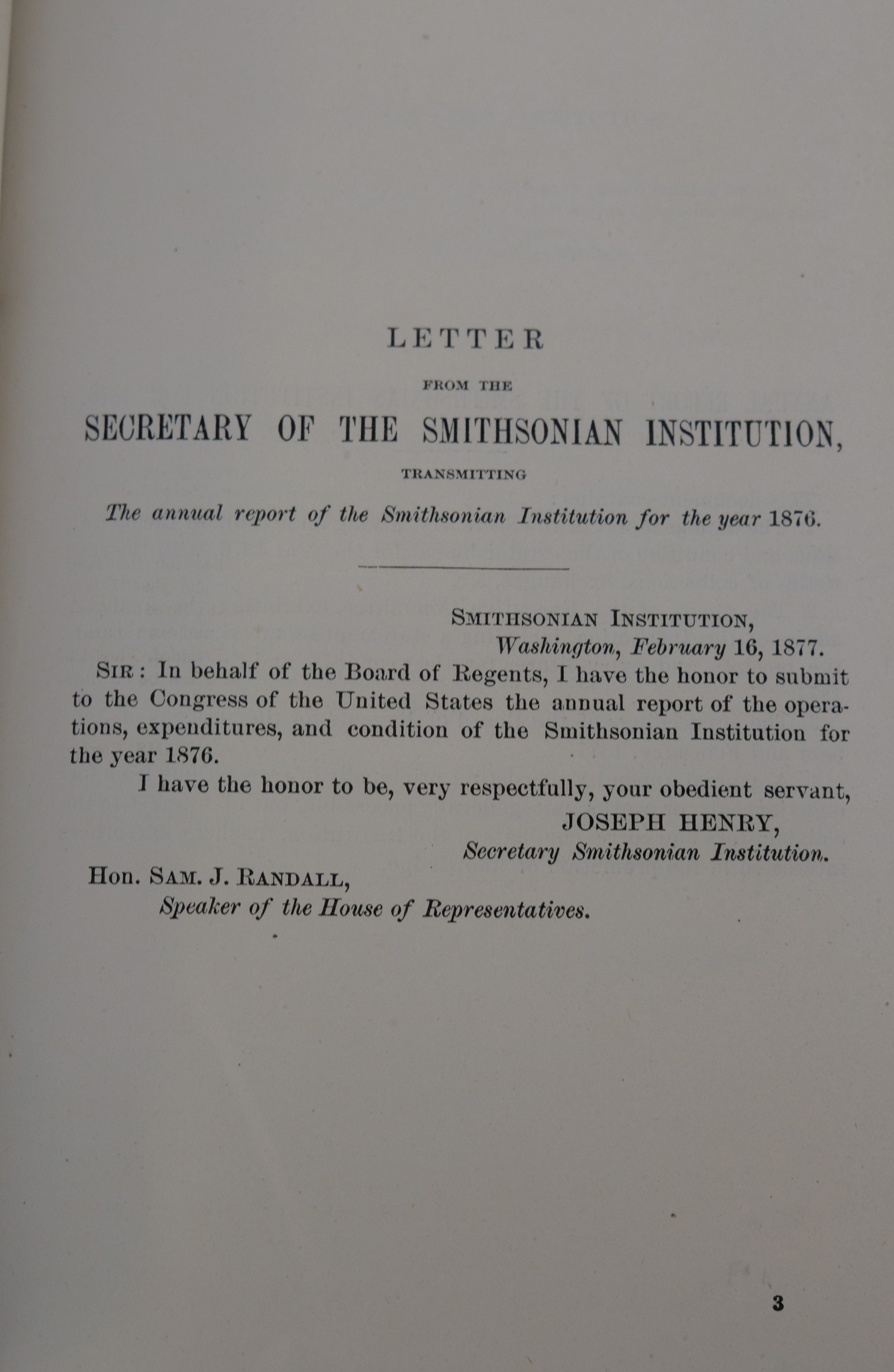
Henry's letter at the beginning of the 1876 annual report of Smithsonian Institution, showing the operations, expenditures, and condition of the institution that year

Henry was introduced to Prof. Thaddeus Lowe, a balloonist from New Hampshire who had taken interest in the phenomenon of lighter-than-air gases, and exploits into meteorology, in particular, the high winds which we call the Jet stream today. It was Lowe's intent to make a transatlantic crossing by utilizing an enormous gas-inflated aerostat. Henry took a great interest in Lowe's endeavors, promoting him among some of the more prominent scientists and institutions of the day.

In June 1860, Lowe had made a successful test flight with his gigantic balloon, first named the City of New York and later renamed The Great Western, flying from Philadelphia to Medford, New York. Lowe would not be able to attempt a transatlantic flight until late Spring of the 1861, so Henry convinced him to take his balloon to a point more West and fly the balloon back to the eastern seaboard, an exercise that would keep his investors interested.

Lowe took several smaller balloons to Cincinnati, Ohio in March 1861. On 19 April, he launched on a fateful flight that landed him in Confederate South Carolina. With the Southern States seceding from the Union, during that winter and spring of 1861, and the onset of Civil War, Lowe abandoned further attempts at a trans-Atlantic crossing and, with Henry's endorsement, went to Washington, D.C. to offer his services as an aeronaut to the Federal government. Henry submitted a letter to U.S. Secretary of War at the time Simon Cameron of Pennsylvania which carried Henry's endorsement:

Hon. SIMON CAMERON

DEAR SIR: In accordance with your request made to me orally on the morning of the 6th of June, I have examined the apparatus and witnessed the balloon experiments of Mr. Lowe, and have come to the following conclusions

1st. The balloon prepared by Mr. Lowe, inflated with ordinary street gas, will retain its charge for several days.

2d. In an inflated condition it can be towed by a few men along an ordinary road, or over fields, in ordinarily calm weather, from the places where it is galled [i.e. swelled or inflated] to another, twenty or more miles distant.

3d. It can be let up into the air by means of a rope in a calm day to a height sufficient to observe the country for twenty miles around and more, according to the degree of clearness of the atmosphere. The ascent may also be made at night and the camp lights of the enemy observed.

4th. From experiments made here for the first time it is conclusively proved that telegrams can be sent with ease and certainty between the balloon and the quarters of the commanding officer.

5th. I feel assured, although I have not witnessed the experiment, that when the surface wind is from the east, as it was for several days last week, an observer in the balloon can be made to float nearly to the enemy's camp (as it is now situated to the west of us), or even to float over it, and then return eastward by rising to a higher elevation. This assumption is based on the fact that the upper strata of wind in this latitude is always flowing eastward. Mr. Lowe informs me, and I do not doubt his statement, that he will on any day which is favorable make an excursion of the kind above mentioned.

6th. From all the facts I have observed and the information I have gathered I am sure that important information may be obtained in regard to the topography of the country and to the position and movements of an enemy by means of the balloon now, and that Mr. Lowe is well qualified to render service in this way by the balloon now in his possession.

7th. The balloon which Mr. Lowe now has in Washington can only be inflated in a city where street gas is to be obtained. If an exploration is required at a point too distant for the transportation of the inflated balloon, an additional apparatus for the generation of hydrogen gas will be required. The necessity of generating the gas renders the use of the balloon more expensive, but this, where important results are required, is of comparatively small importance.

For these preliminary experiments, as you may recollect, a sum not to exceed $200 or $250 was to be appropriated, and in accordance with this Mr. Lowe has presented me with the in closed statement of items, which I think are reasonable, since nothing is charged for labor and time of the aeronautic.

I have the honor to remain, very respectfully, your obedient servant,

JOSEPH HENRY,

Secretary Smithsonian Institution.

On Henry's recommendation Lowe went on to form the United States Army/"Union Army" Balloon Corps and served two years with the Army of the Potomac as a Civil War "Aeronaut".

Henry was also in correspondence another ballooning pioneer and rival of Lowe, John Wise. In May 1859, Wise launched a balloon named "Smithsonian" in honor of Henry and the institution. Wise recorded his observations while flying within a thunderstorm and sent them to Henry, who later described them as "of very great value". Although Henry intended to fly with Wise during the summer of 1859, Wise's preparations for his own transatlantic flight prevented any such flights from occurring.

=== National Academy of Sciences ===
On January 25, 1866, Henry was elected as vice president of the National Academy of Sciences. He was elected as president in January 1868. In 1873, he stated his intention of resigning from the role, but a letter signed by members of the academy prevented his resignation. In April 1878, he again stated his interest in resigning if his health did not improve in the next six months. He remained in the role until his death the following month. Upon his death, the academy dedicated a trust named the Joseph Henry Fund.

=== Later years ===
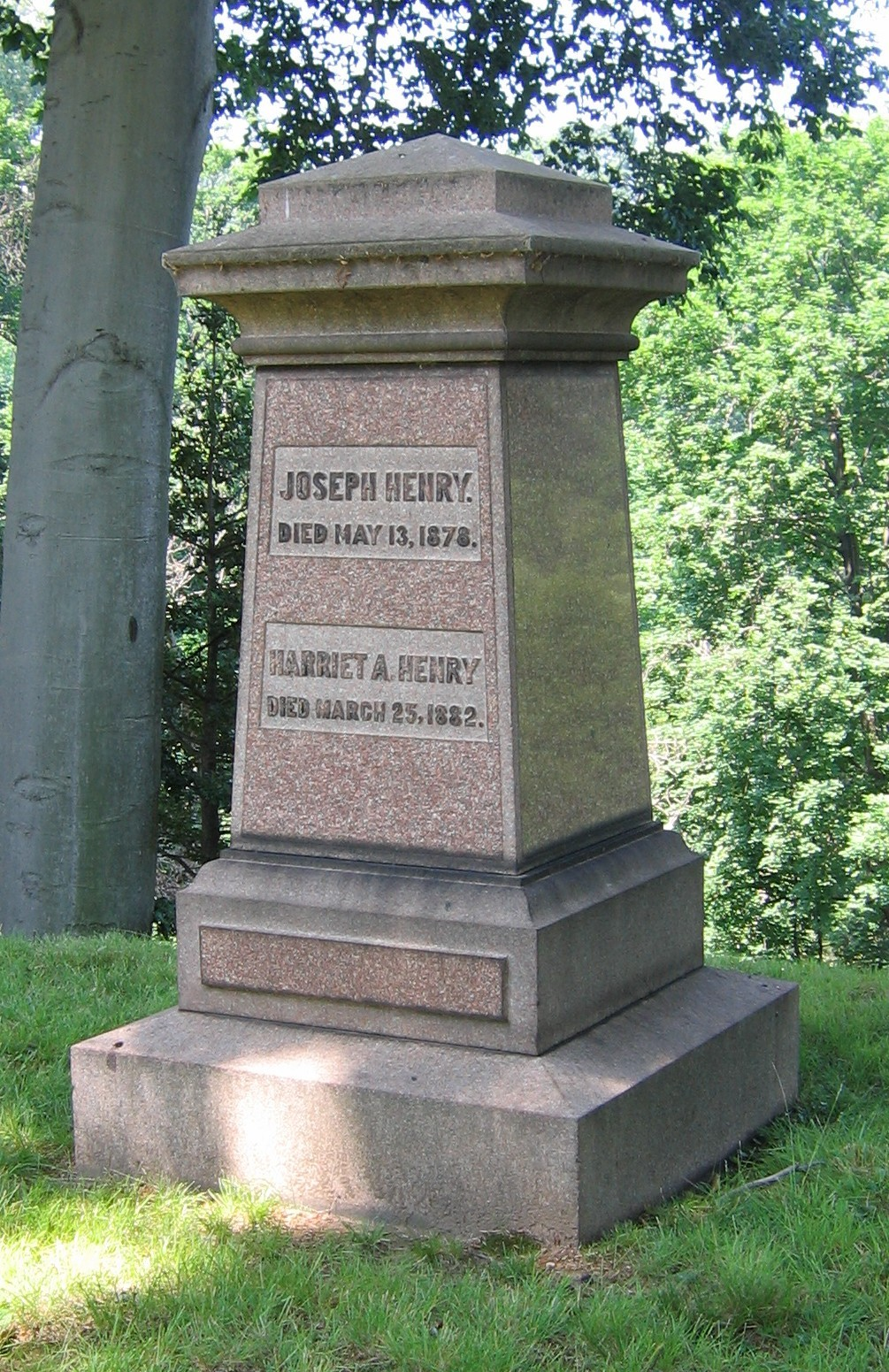
Henry's grave in Oak Hill Cemetery in Washington, D.C.

As a public scientist and director of the Smithsonian Institution, Henry received visits from other scientists and inventors who sought his advice. Henry was patient, kindly, self-controlled, and gently humorous. One such visitor was Alexander Graham Bell, who on 1 March 1875 carried a letter of introduction to Henry. Henry showed an interest in seeing Bell's experimental apparatus, and Bell returned the following day. After the demonstration, Bell mentioned his untested theory on how to transmit human speech electrically by means of a "harp apparatus" which would have several steel reeds tuned to different frequencies to cover the voice spectrum. Henry said Bell had "the germ of a great invention". Henry advised Bell not to publish his ideas until he had perfected the invention. When Bell objected that he lacked the necessary knowledge, Henry firmly advised: "Get it!"

On June 25, 1876, Bell's experimental telephone, using a different design, was demonstrated at the Centennial Exhibition in Philadelphia, where Henry was one of the judges for electrical exhibits. On 13 January 1877, Bell demonstrated his instruments to Henry at the Smithsonian Institution and Henry invited Bell to demonstrate them again that night at the Washington Philosophical Society. Henry praised "the value and astonishing character of Mr. Bell's discovery and invention."

Henry died on May 13, 1878, and was buried in Oak Hill Cemetery in the Georgetown section of northwest Washington, D.C. John Philip Sousa wrote the Transit of Venus March for the unveiling of the Joseph Henry statue in front of the Smithsonian Castle.

== Legacy ==
Henry was a member of the United States Lighthouse Board from 1852 until his death. He was appointed chairman in 1871 and served in that position the remainder of his life. He was the only civilian to serve as chairman. The United States Coast Guard honored Henry for his work on lighthouses and fog signal acoustics by naming a cutter after him. The Joseph Henry, usually referred to as the Joe Henry, was launched in 1880 and was active until 1904.

In 1915, Henry was inducted into the Hall of Fame for Great Americans in the Bronx, New York.

Bronze statues of Henry and Isaac Newton represent science on the balustrade of the galleries of the Main Reading Room in the Thomas Jefferson Building of the Library of Congress on Capitol Hill in Washington, D.C. They are two of the 16 historical figures depicted in the reading room, each pair representing one of the 8 pillars of civilization.

In 1872, Almon Thompson named a mountain range in southeastern Utah after Henry. The Henry Mountains were the last mountain range to be added to the map of the 48 contiguous U.S. states.

At Princeton University, the Joseph Henry Laboratories and the Joseph Henry House are named for him.

After the Albany Academy moved out of its downtown building in the early 1930s, its old building in Academy Park was renamed Joseph Henry Memorial with a statue of him in front. It is now the main offices of the Albany City School District. In 1971, it was listed on the National Register of Historic Places; later it was included as a contributing property when the Lafayette Park Historic District was listed on the Register. One of his students at Albany Academy was Herman Melville.

== Curriculum vitae ==
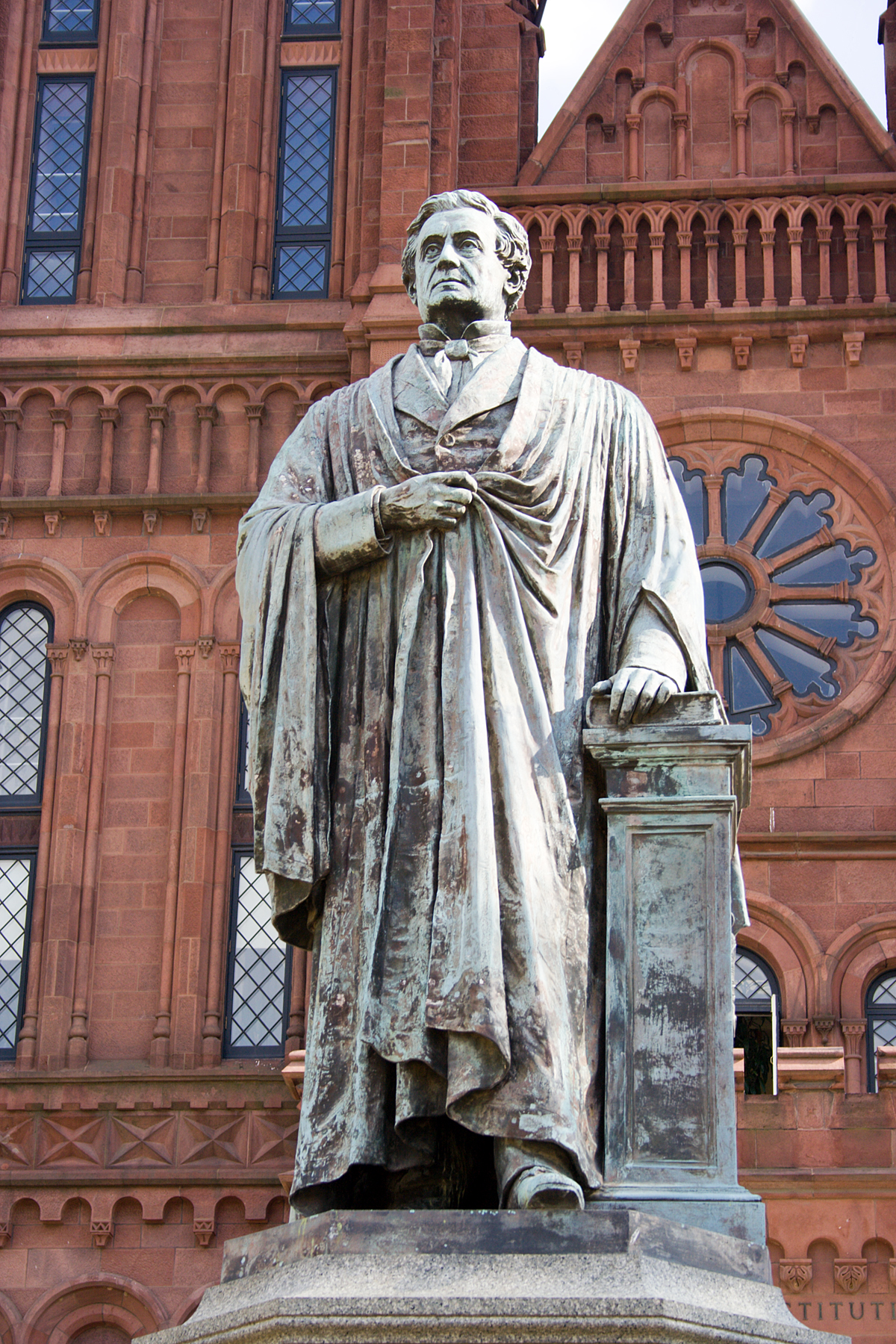
Statue of Henry in front of the Smithsonian Institution

- 1826 – Professor of mathematics and natural philosophy at The Albany Academy, New York.
- 1832 – Chair of Natural History at Princeton University (then the College of New Jersey) until 1846
- 1835 – Invented the electromechanical relay.
- 1846 – First secretary of the Smithsonian Institution until 1878
- 1848 – Edited Ephraim G. Squier and Edwin H. Davis' Ancient Monuments of the Mississippi Valley, the Institution's first publication.
- 1852 – Appointed to the Lighthouse Board
- 1871 – Appointed chairman of the Lighthouse Board

== Other honors ==
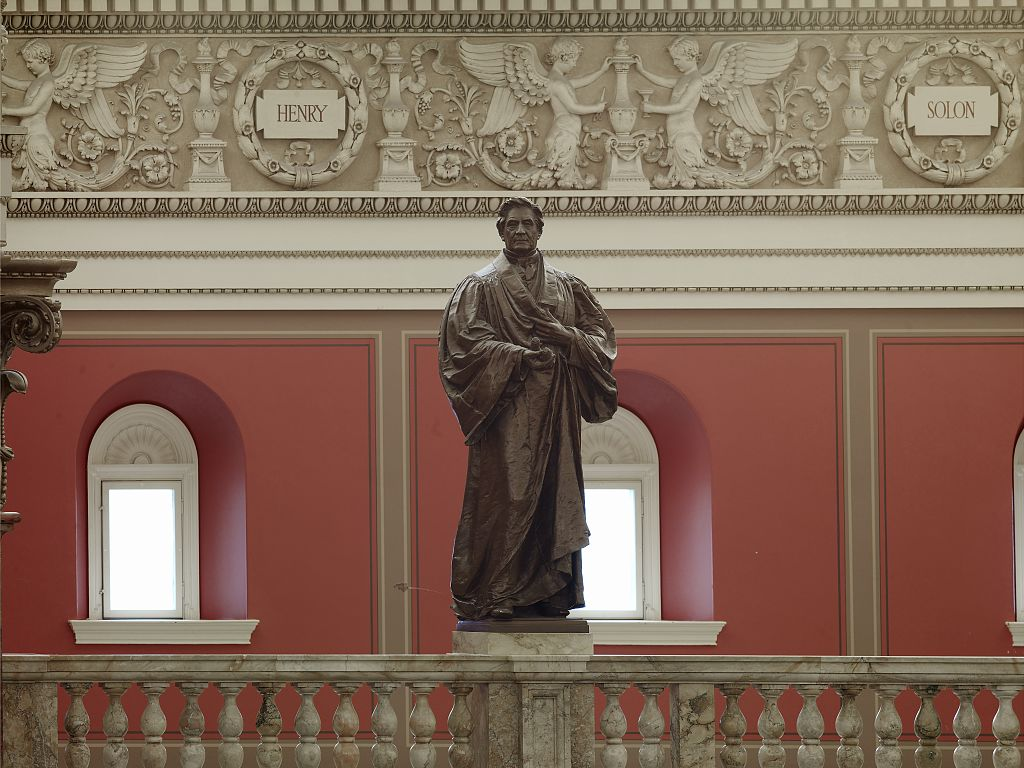
A bronze statue of Henry on the rotunda of the Library of Congress

Elected a member of the American Philosophical Society in 1835 and American Antiquarian Society in 1851.

The school he attended in Galway, New York was renamed Joseph Henry Elementary School in his honor.

Washington, D.C. named a school, built in 1878–80, on P Street between 6th and 7th the Joseph Henry School; it was demolished at some point after 1932.

The Henry Mountains (Utah) had been so named by geologist Almon Thompson in his honor.

Mount Henry in California is named in his honor.

== Taxon named in his honor ==
- Isichthys henryi is a freshwater ray-finned fish belonging to the family Mormyridae, the elephantfishes.

== See also ==
- Electromagnetism
- Henry (unit)
- Multiple coil magnet
- Timeline of historic inventions
- Timeline of communication technology
- American Philosophical Society
- History of Albany, New York
- Daniel Davis Jr. - electrical device inventor

Government offices
| Preceded by None | Secretary of the Smithsonian Institution; 1846–1878 | Succeeded by Spencer Fullerton Baird |
Professional and academic associations
| Preceded by Alexander Dallas Bache | President of the National Academy of Sciences; 1868 – 1878 | Succeeded by William Barton Rogers |
