= Smithsonian Institution Building =

Building in Washington, D.C.

- U.S. National Register of Historic Places
- U.S. National Historic Landmark
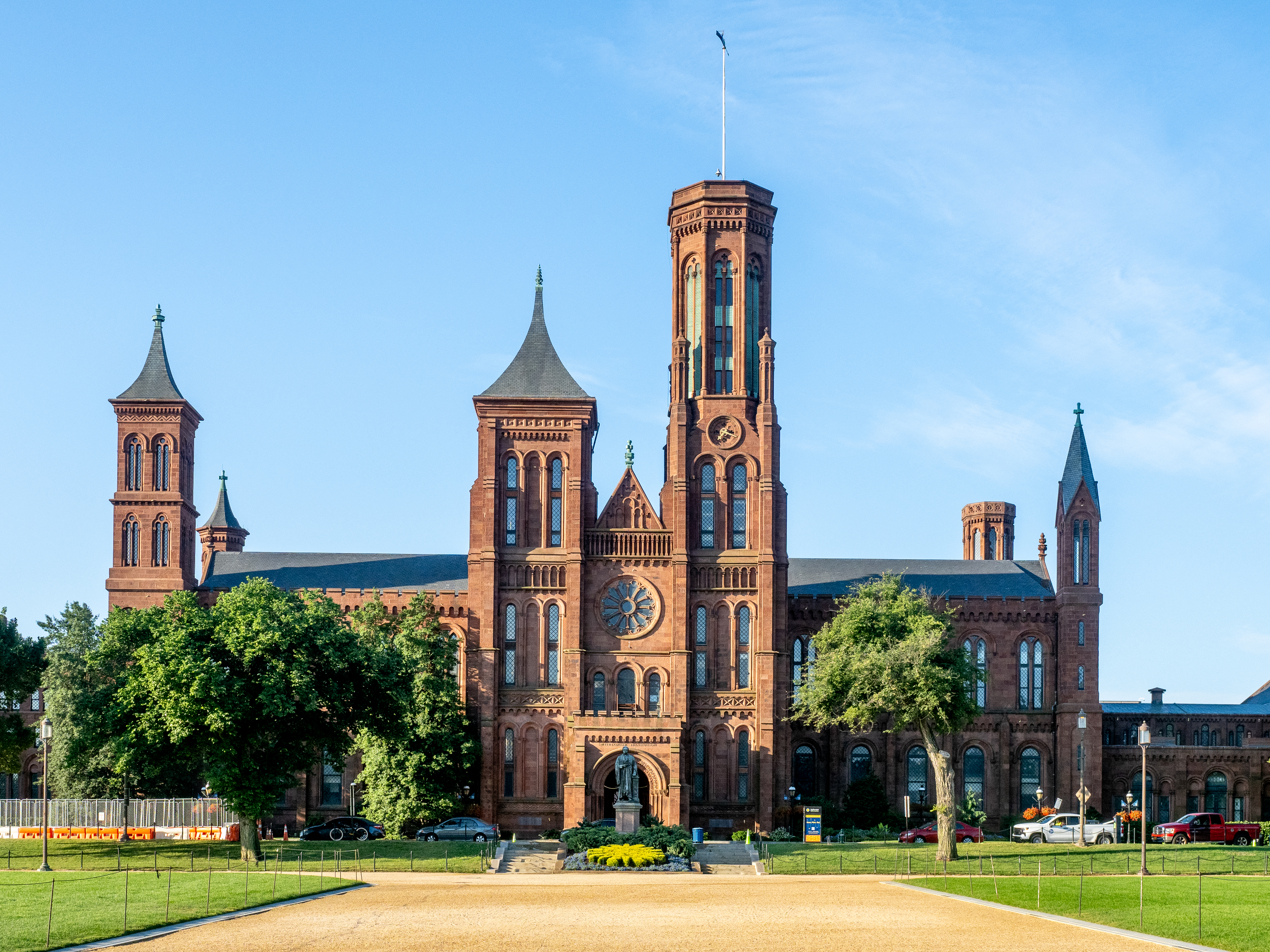
- Main façade of the Smithsonian Building
- Interactive map of Smithsonian Institution Building
- Location: Washington, D.C.
- Coordinates: 38°53′19.49″N 77°1′33.59″W
- Built: 1849–1855
- Architect: James Renwick Jr.
- NRHP reference No.: 66000867

Significant dates
- Added to NRHP: October 15, 1966
- Designated NHL: January 12, 1965

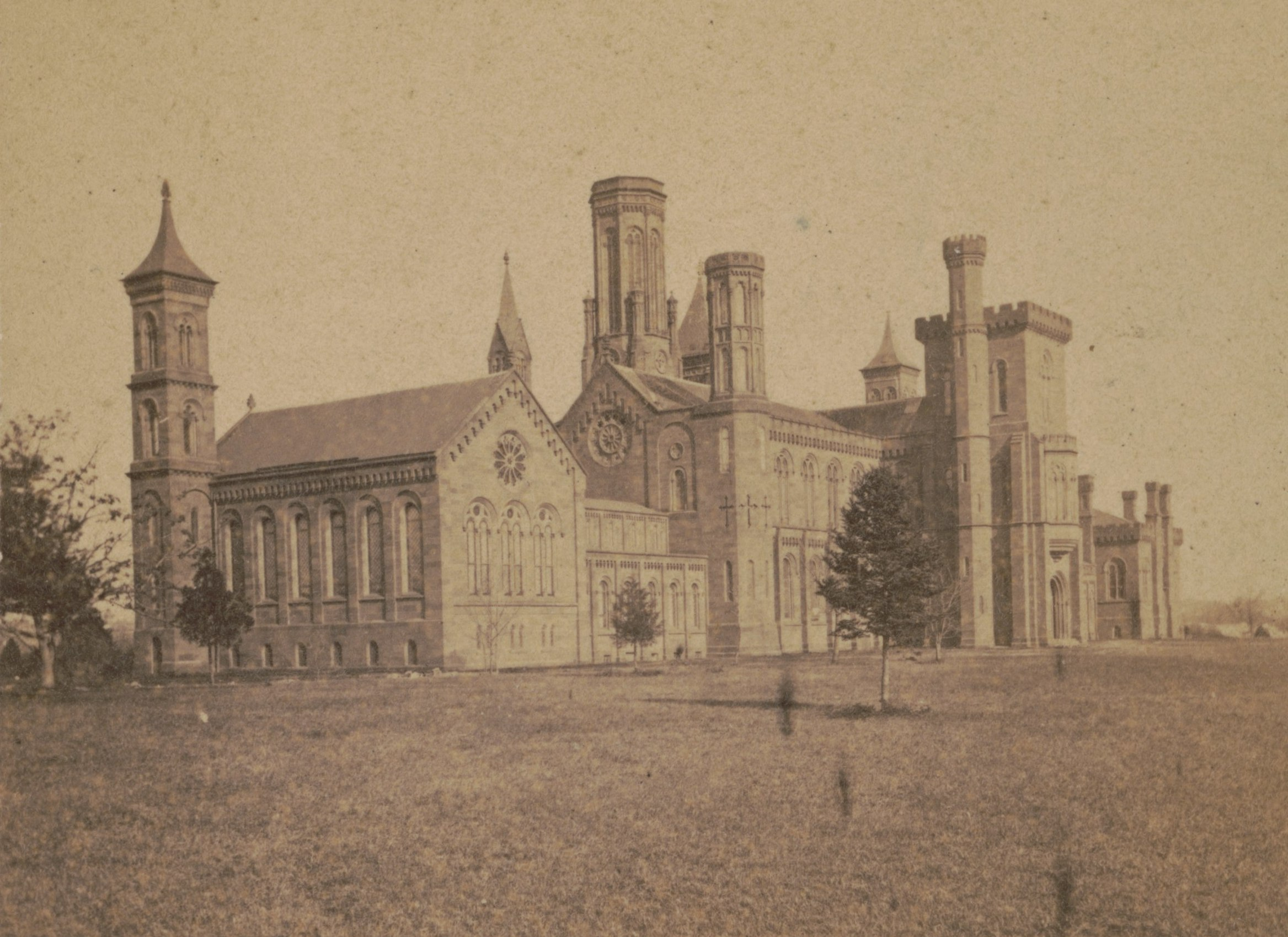
View facing northeast, 1864

The Smithsonian Institution Building, more commonly known as the Smithsonian Castle or simply The Castle, is a building on the National Mall in Washington, D.C., housing the Smithsonian Institution's administrative offices and information center. Built as the first Smithsonian museum building, it is constructed of Seneca red sandstone in the Norman Revival style (a recalling of a 12th-century combination of late Romanesque and early Gothic motifs; built in the Gothic and Romanesque revival styles). It was completed in 1855 and designated a National Historic Landmark in 1965.

== History ==
=== 19th century ===
The Castle was the first Smithsonian building, designed by architect James Renwick Jr., whose other works include St. Patrick's Cathedral in New York City and the Smithsonian's Renwick Gallery, also in Washington D.C. The building committee held a nationwide design competition in 1846 and selected Renwick's design by a unanimous vote. Renwick's second design, which was Gothic Revival in style, was used in the design of Trinity Episcopal Church. A cardboard model of Renwick's winning design survives and is on display in the Castle. Renwick was assisted by Robert Mills, particularly in the internal arrangement of the building.

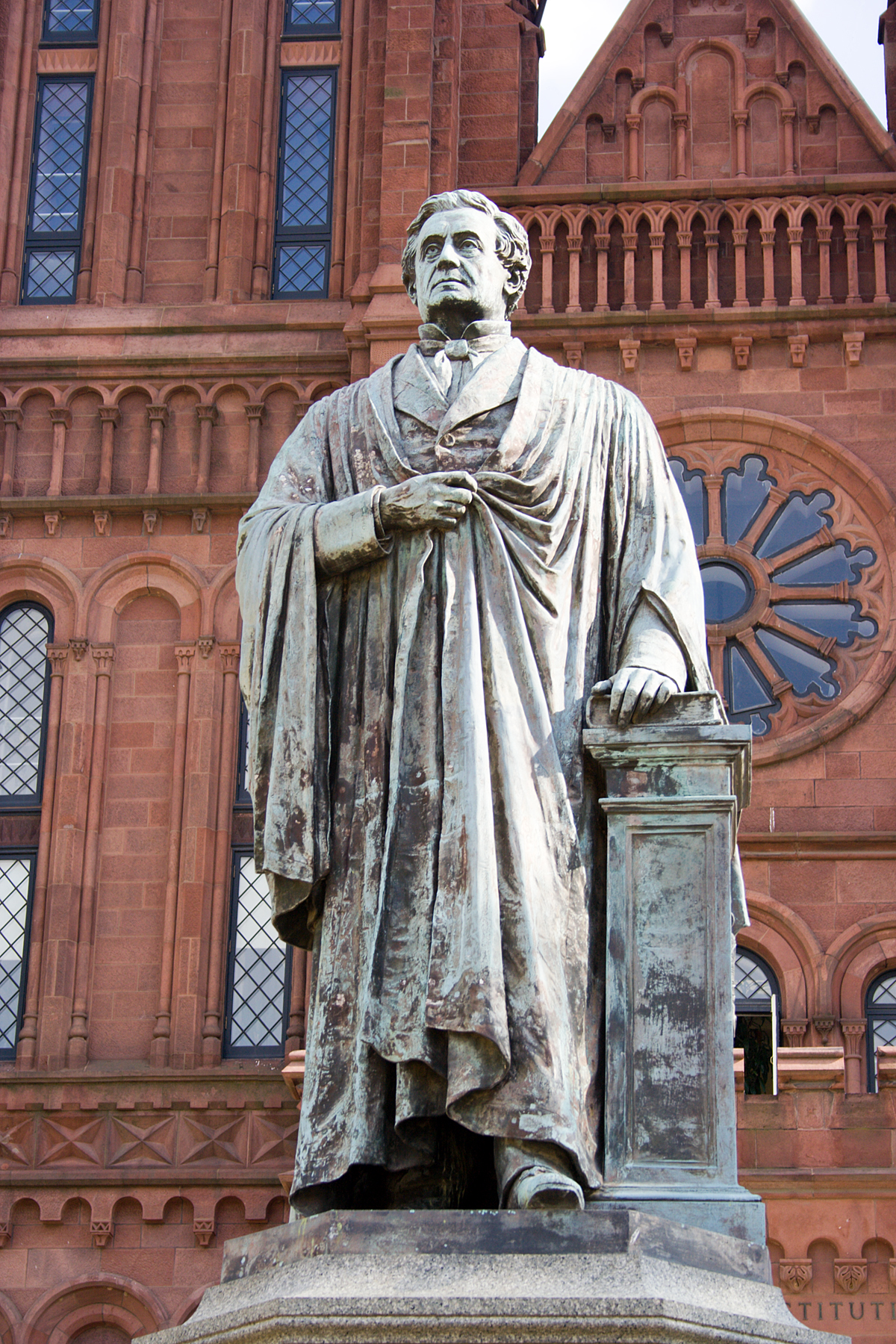
A statue of Joseph Henry displayed in front of the building

Initially intended to be built in white marble, then in yellow sandstone, the architect and building committee finally settled on Seneca red sandstone from the Seneca Quarry in Montgomery County, Maryland. The redstone was substantially less expensive than granite or marble, and while initially easy to work, was found to harden to a satisfactory degree on exposure to the elements. Scholarly evidence indicates it is likely that slaves were employed at Seneca in quarrying stone for the Castle, though no evidence has surfaced that slaves were involved in the actual Castle construction.

The building committee selected Gilbert Cameron as the general contractor, and construction began in 1847. The East Wing was completed in 1849 and occupied by Secretary Joseph Henry and his family. The West Wing was completed later the same year. A structural collapse in 1850 of partly completed work raised questions of workmanship and resulted in a change to fireproof construction. The Castle's exterior was completed in 1852; Renwick's work was completed and he withdrew from further participation. Cameron continued the interior work, which he completed in 1855. Construction funds came from "accrued interest on the Smithson bequest."

Despite the upgraded fireproof construction, a fire in 1865 caused extensive damage to the upper floor of the building, destroying the correspondence of James Smithson, Henry's papers, two hundred oil paintings of American Indians by John Mix Stanley, the Regent's Room and the lecture hall, and the contents of the public libraries of Alexandria, Virginia and Beaufort, South Carolina, confiscated by Union forces during the American Civil War. The ensuing renovation was undertaken by local Washington architect Adolf Cluss in 1865–67. Further fireproofing work ensued in 1883, also by Cluss, who by this time had designed the neighboring Arts and Industries Building. A third and fourth floor were added to the East Wing, and a third floor to the West Wing. Electric lighting was installed in 1895.

=== 20th century ===
Around 1900, the wooden floor of the Great Hall was replaced with terrazzo and a Children's Museum was installed near the south entrance. A tunnel connected to the Arts and Industries Building. A general renovation took place in 1968–70 to install modern electrical systems, elevators and heating, ventilation and air conditioning systems. The Enid A. Haupt Garden was dedicated in 1987, along with the Renwick Gate facing Independence Avenue, built from Seneca redstone retrieved from the demolished D.C. Jail.

=== 21st century ===
In February 2023, the Castle closed for a planned five-year renovation. The project would include restoration of many aspects of the building, and removal of an upper floor of offices to restore the Grand Hall to its original appearance. The Castle temporarily reopened in May 2026 for the United States Semiquincentennial; renovations resumed that September.

== Description ==
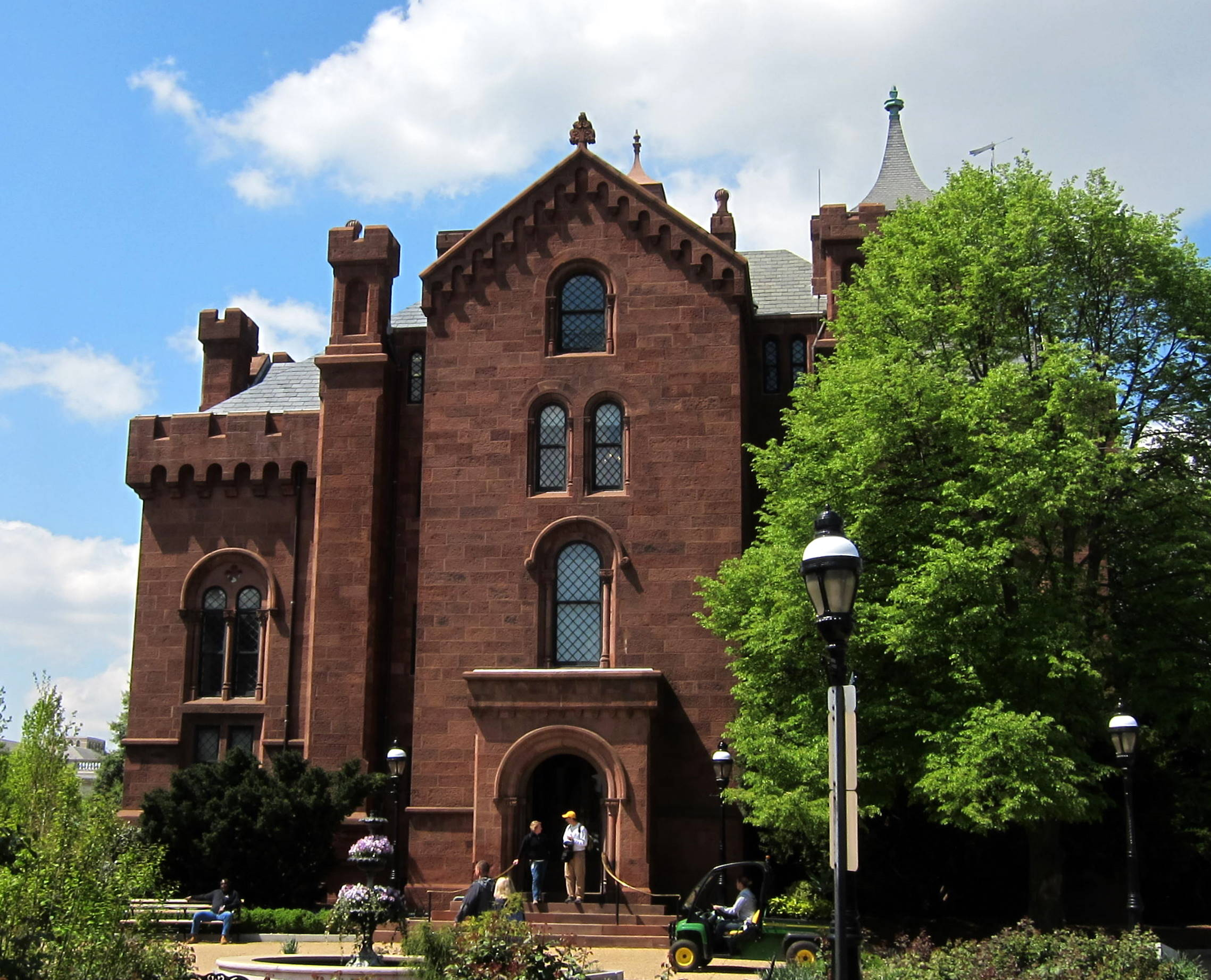
East entrance to the building

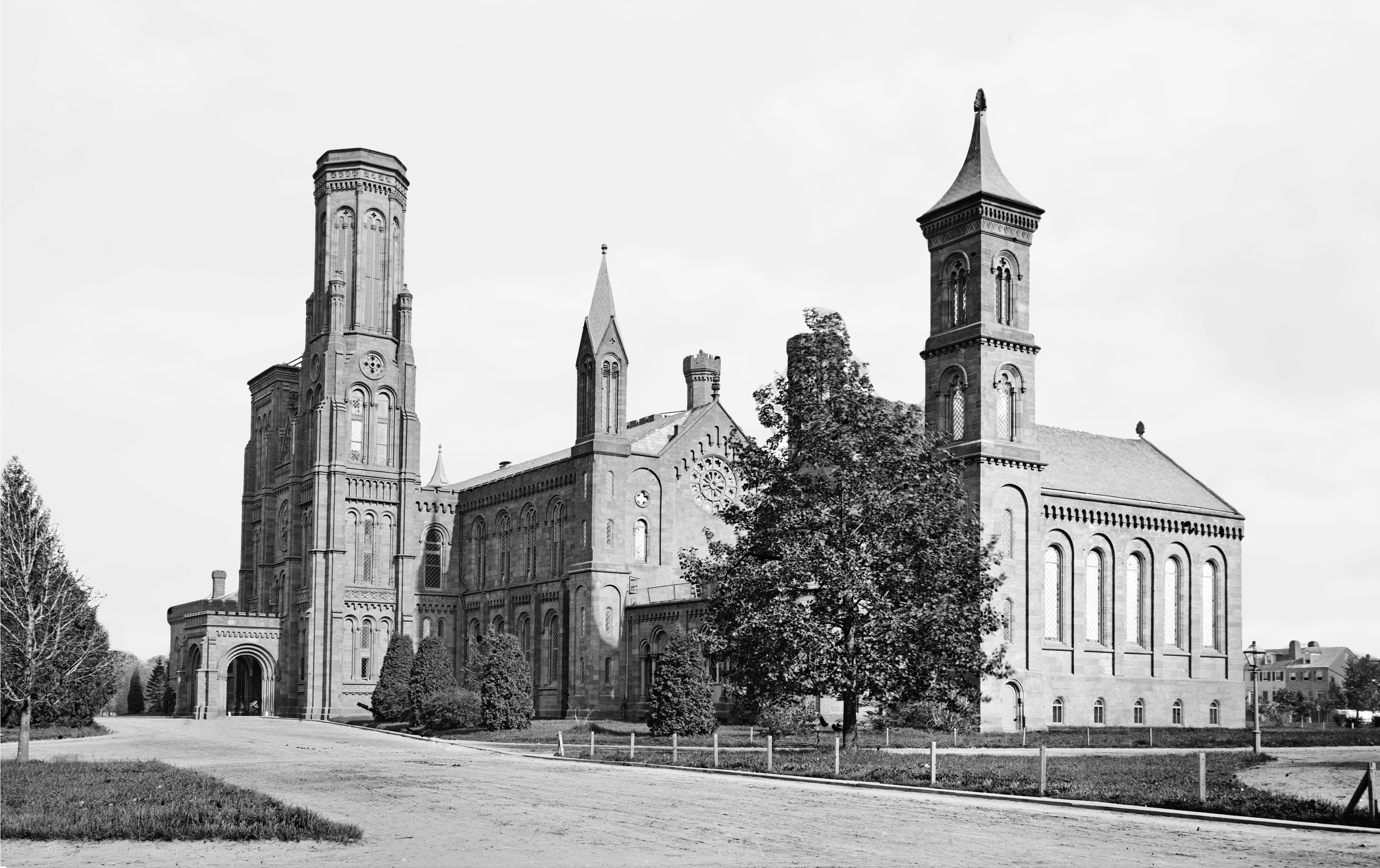
View facing southeast, c. 1870

Renwick designed the Castle as the focal point of a picturesque landscape on the National Mall using elements from Georg Moller's Denkmäler der deutschen Baukunst. Renwick originally intended to detail the building with entirely American sculptural flora in the manner of Benjamin Henry Latrobe's work at the United States Capitol, but the final work used conventional pattern-book designs.

The building is completed in the Gothic Revival style with Romanesque motifs. This style was chosen to evoke the Collegiate Gothic in England and the ideas of knowledge and wisdom. The façade is built with red sandstone from the Seneca quarry in Seneca, Maryland in contrast to the granite, marble and yellow sandstone from the other major buildings in Washington, D.C.

The building comprises a central section, two extensions or ranges, and two wings. Four towers contain occupiable space, while five smaller towers are primarily decorative, although some contain stairs. As constructed, the central section contained the main entry and museum space (now the Great Hall), with a basement beneath and a large lecture room above. Two galleries on the second floor were used to display artifacts and art. This area is now the Visitor's Information and Associates' Reception area. The East Range contained laboratory space on the first floor and research space on the second. The East Wing contained storage space on the first floor and a suite of rooms on the second as an apartment for the Secretary of the Smithsonian. This space is currently used as administrative offices and archives. The West Range was one story and used as a reading room. The West Wing, known as the chapel, was used as a library. The West Wing and Range are now used as a quiet room for visitors.

On the exterior, the principal tower on the south side is 91 feet (28 m) high and 37 feet (11 m) square. On the north side there are two towers, the taller on 145 feet (44 m) tall. A campanile at the northeast corner is 17 feet (5.2 m) square and 117 feet (36 m) tall.

The plan allowed for expansion at either end, a major reason for the informal medieval-inspired design, which would not suffer if asymmetrically developed.

Exterior views

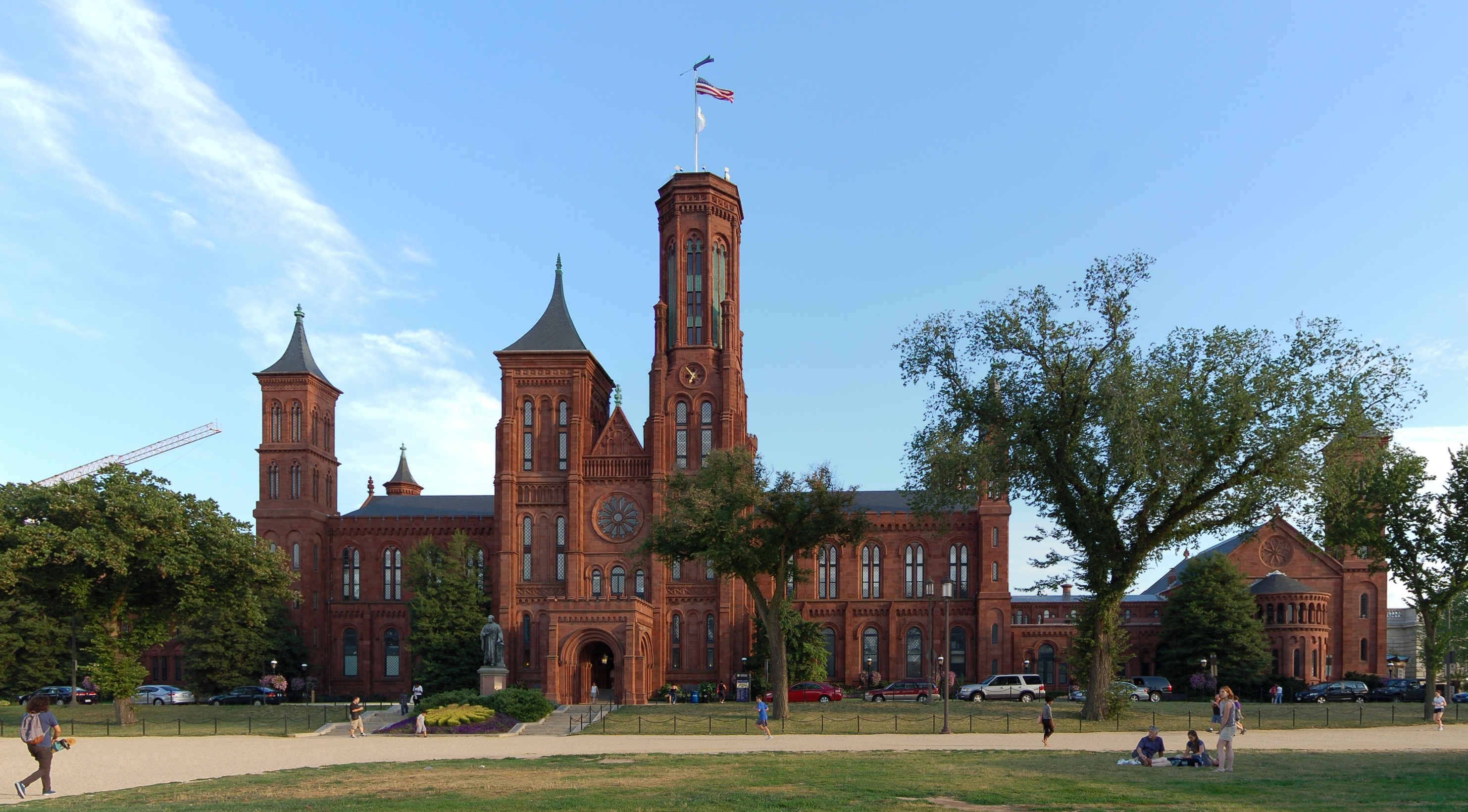
North façade

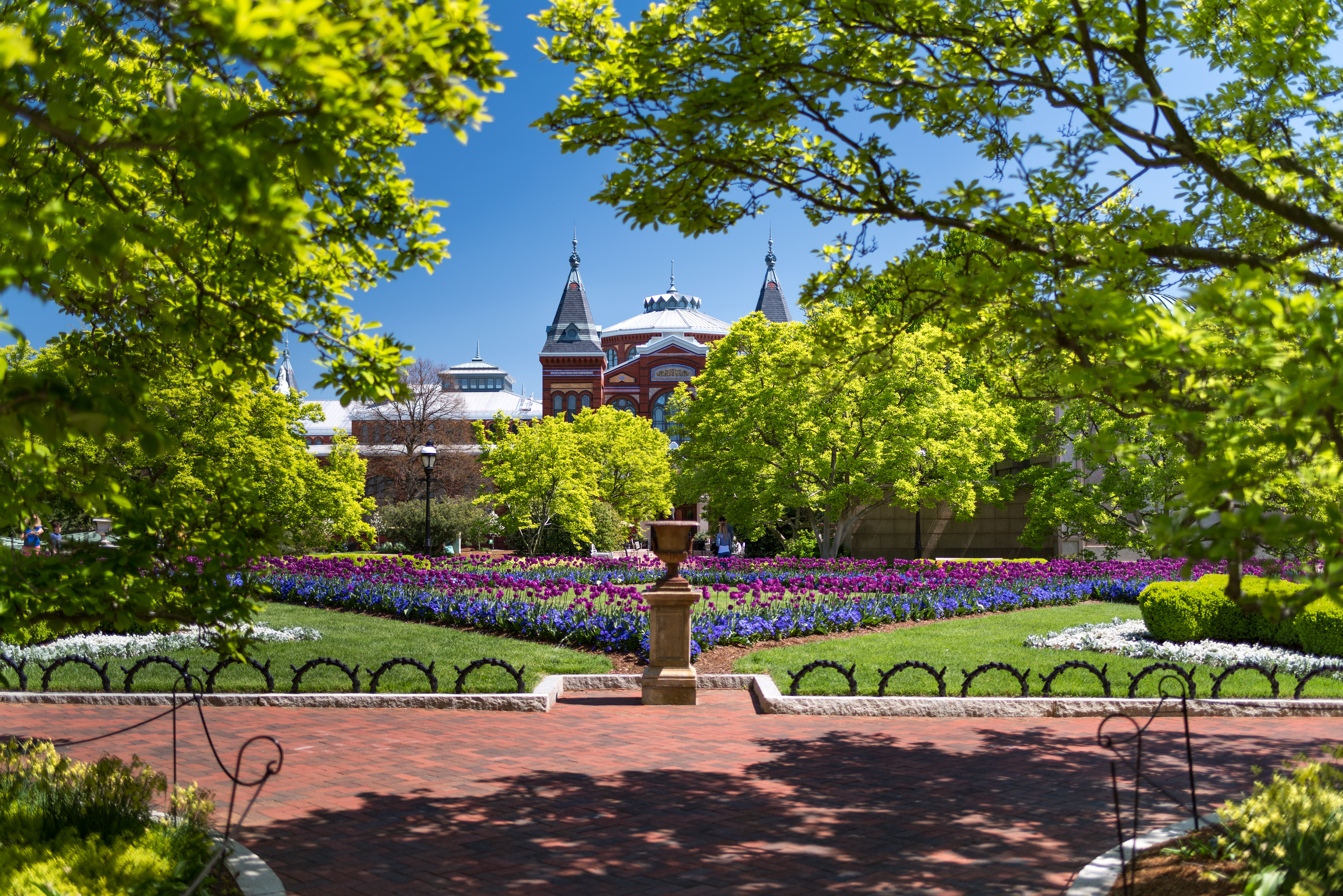
Enid A. Haupt Garden

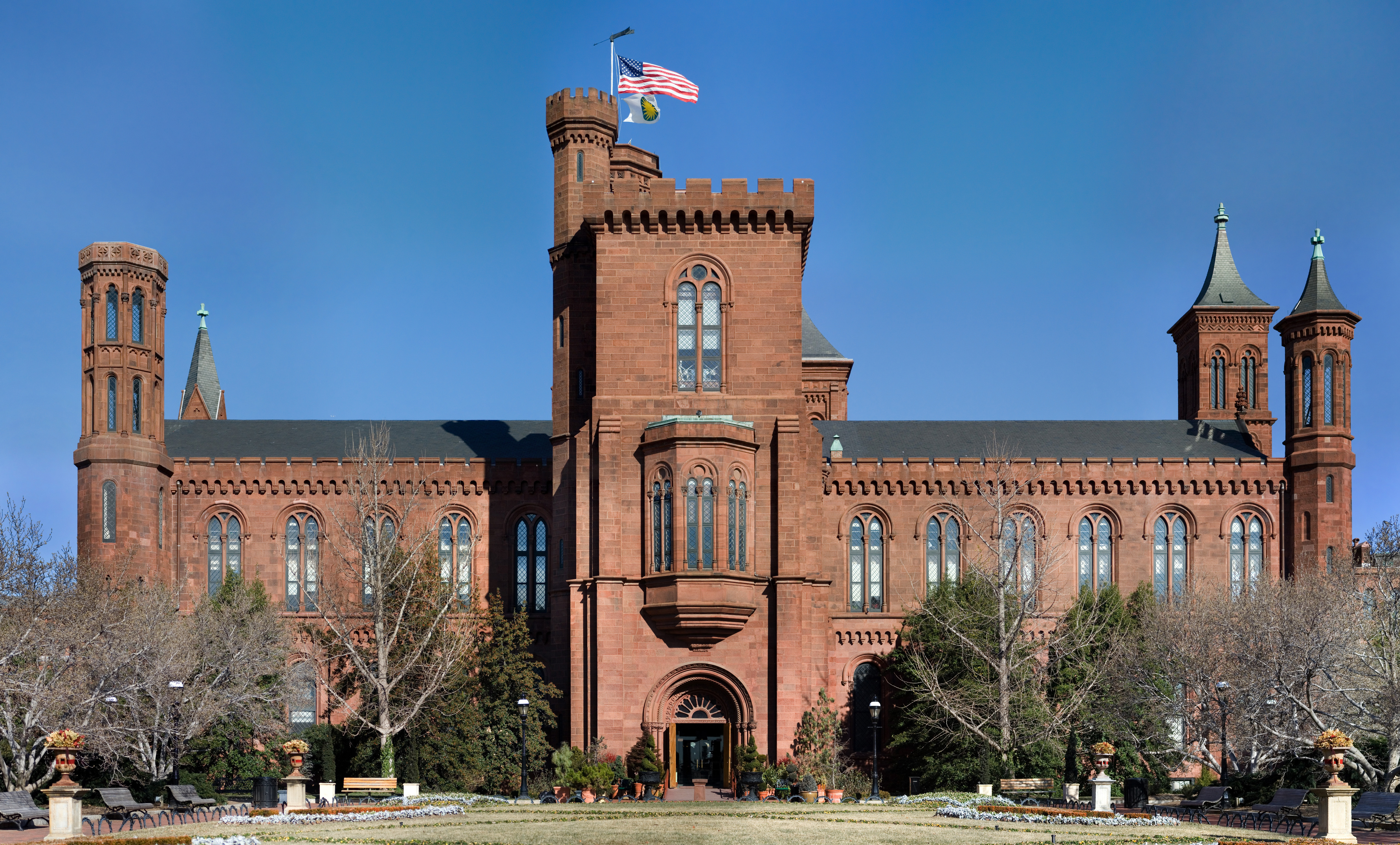
South façade

== Current use ==
The Smithsonian Castle houses the administrative offices of the Smithsonian. The main Smithsonian visitor center is also located here, with interactive displays and maps. Computers electronically answer most common questions. A crypt just inside the north entrance houses the tomb of James Smithson.

== See also ==
- Architecture of Washington, D.C.
- Mary Anna Henry, resident who kept detailed observations of events at the Castle during the Civil War.
- Seneca Quarry, the source of red sandstone for the Smithsonian Castle, listed on the National Register of Historic Places
