= Mary Anna Henry =

American diarist (1834–1903)

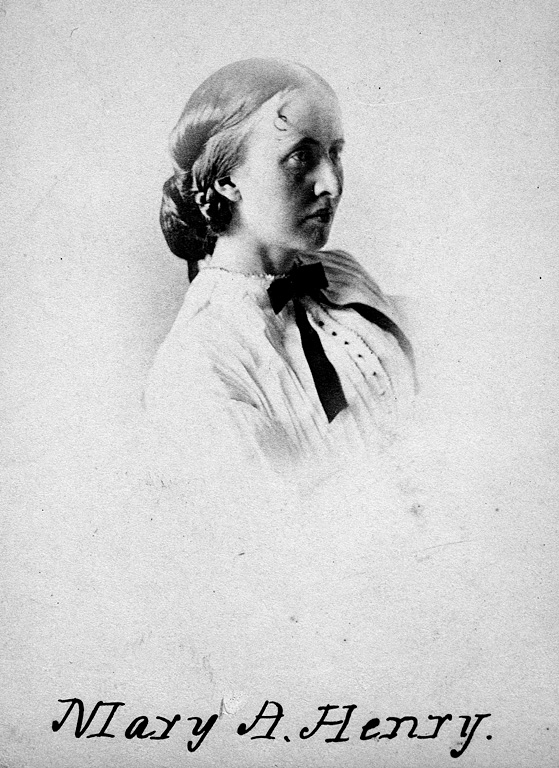
Henry, c. 1855

Mary Anna Henry (1834 – 1903) was an American diarist noted for her documentation of Washington, D.C. in the years before, during, and after the American Civil War. It was donated to the Smithsonian after her death, then transcribed and published with footnotes in 2014. Her diary is noted for its level of detail and is now used to teach the history of the Civil War.

== Early life ==
Mary Anna Henry was born in 1834, in Princeton, New Jersey to Joseph and Harriet Henry. The Henry family relocated to Washington, D.C. when Mary's father, Joseph Henry, was appointed as the first Secretary of the Smithsonian Institution. She and the Henry family lived in the Smithsonian Institution Building (the "Castle") from 1855 until her father's death in 1878.

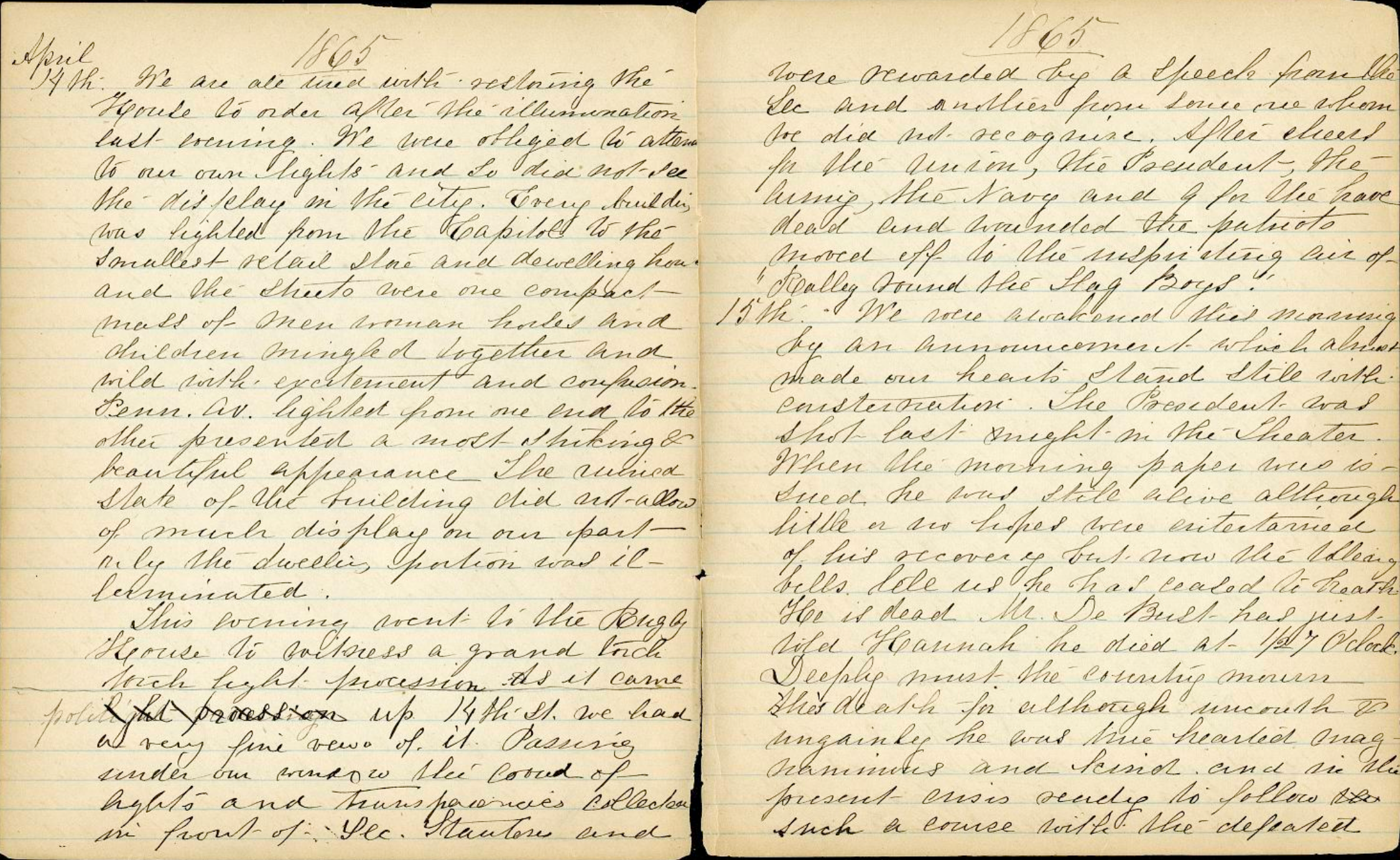
Mary Henry's diary entry, April 15, 1865, recounting news of President Lincoln's Assassination

== Diary ==
From 1858 to 1868, Henry kept a diary that included her experiences within the Smithsonian building, news reports of major Civil War battles, observations of troop movements, and attitudes of the people of Washington, D.C. Henry also wrote a detailed account of the assassination of Abraham Lincoln and his funeral.

In her life in Washington, DC, Henry met with powerful social, political, and both military leaders and soldiers. Due to her father's position, Henry also greeted and entertained scholars and scientists visiting the Smithsonian Castle.
