= Transit of Venus March =

March scored for military brass band

- March by John Philip Sousa
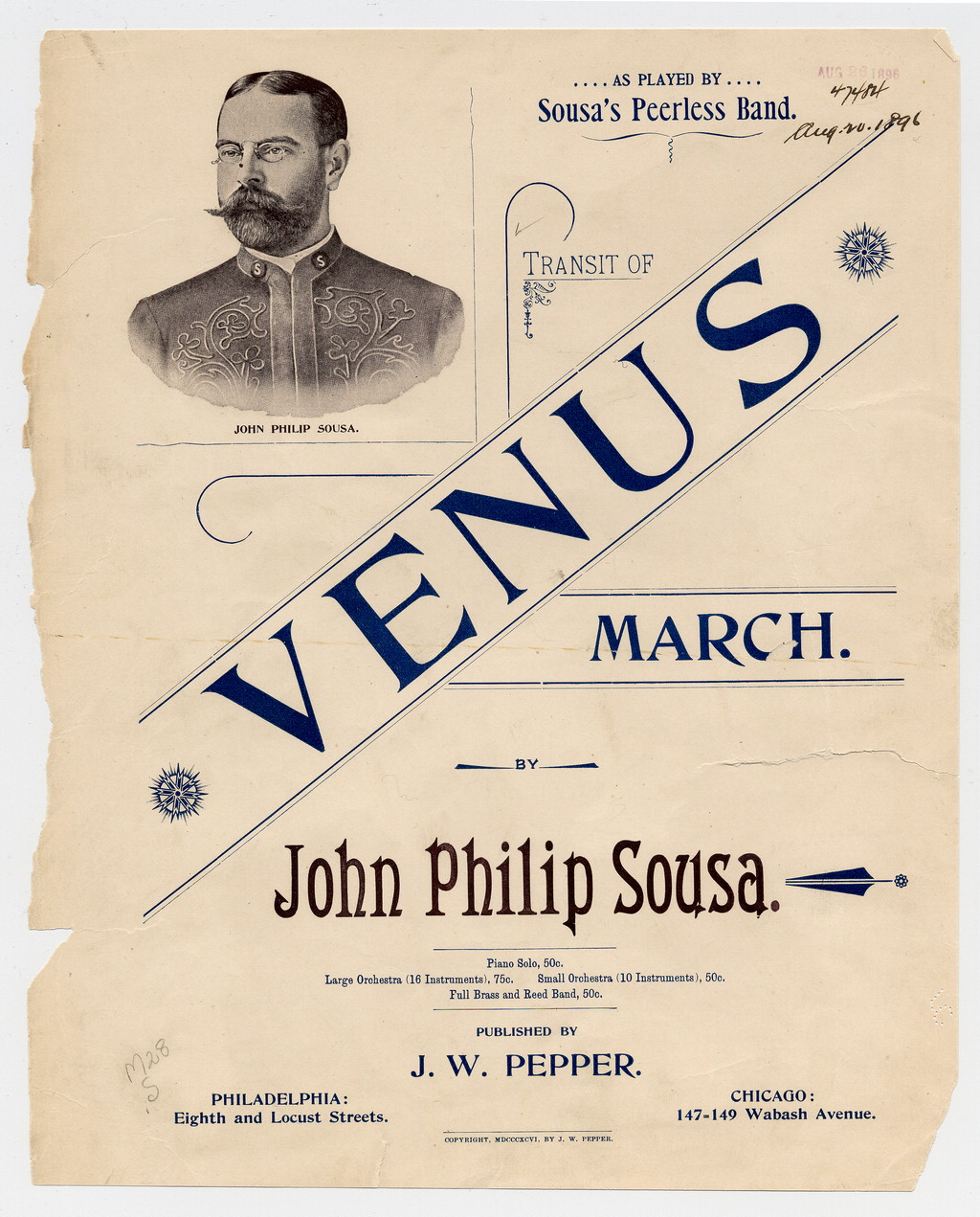
- Sheet music cover (1896)
- Occasion: 1882 Transit of Venus
- Composed: 1883
- Dedication: Joseph Henry
- Publisher: J.W. Pepper Co.

Audio sample
- 2016 performance by the United States Marine Band: file; help

The "Transit of Venus March" is a march scored for military brass band written by John Philip Sousa in 1883 to celebrate the 1882 Transit of Venus and published by the J.W. Pepper Company. The work was erroneously thought to be lost for over 100 years when a piano transcription (Note: Front cover shown at right; the full sheet music can be found on Wikisource.) published in 1896 was found by a Library of Congress employee in 2003. Copies of the original Pepper publication, however, do survive.

== Background ==
One year after the 1882 Transit of Venus, Sousa was commissioned to compose a processional for the unveiling of a bronze statue of American physicist Joseph Henry, who had died in 1878. Henry, who had developed the first electric motor, was also the first secretary of the Smithsonian Institution in Washington, D.C.

A Freemason, Sousa was fascinated by what the group considered mystical qualities in otherwise natural phenomena. According to Sten Odenwald of the NASA IMAGE Science Center, this played a significant role in the selection of the time and date of the performance, April 19, 1883, at 4:00 P.M. Dr. Odenwald points out that Venus and Mars, invisible to the participants, were setting in the west. At the same time, the moon, Uranus, and Virgo were rising in the east, Saturn had crossed the meridian, and Jupiter was directly overhead. According to Masonic lore, Venus was associated with the element copper, a component of electric motors.

== 2003 resurrection ==
The "Transit of Venus March" never caught on during Sousa's lifetime. It went unplayed for many years, after Sousa's manuscript copies of the music were destroyed in a flood. As reported in The Washington Post, Library of Congress employee Loris J. Schissel found copies of the old sheet music for the "Transit of Venus March" "languishing in the library's files". (Note: The reason for its presence there, and its going unnoticed for so long, is unclear.) The piece was resurrected in time for the 2004 Transit of Venus. The piece had been performed on compilation albums before then, but it was the 2004 transit that brought it to wide public attention.

The Library of Congress joined with NASA to celebrate the 2004 transit with this march.

== Gallery ==
=== People ===
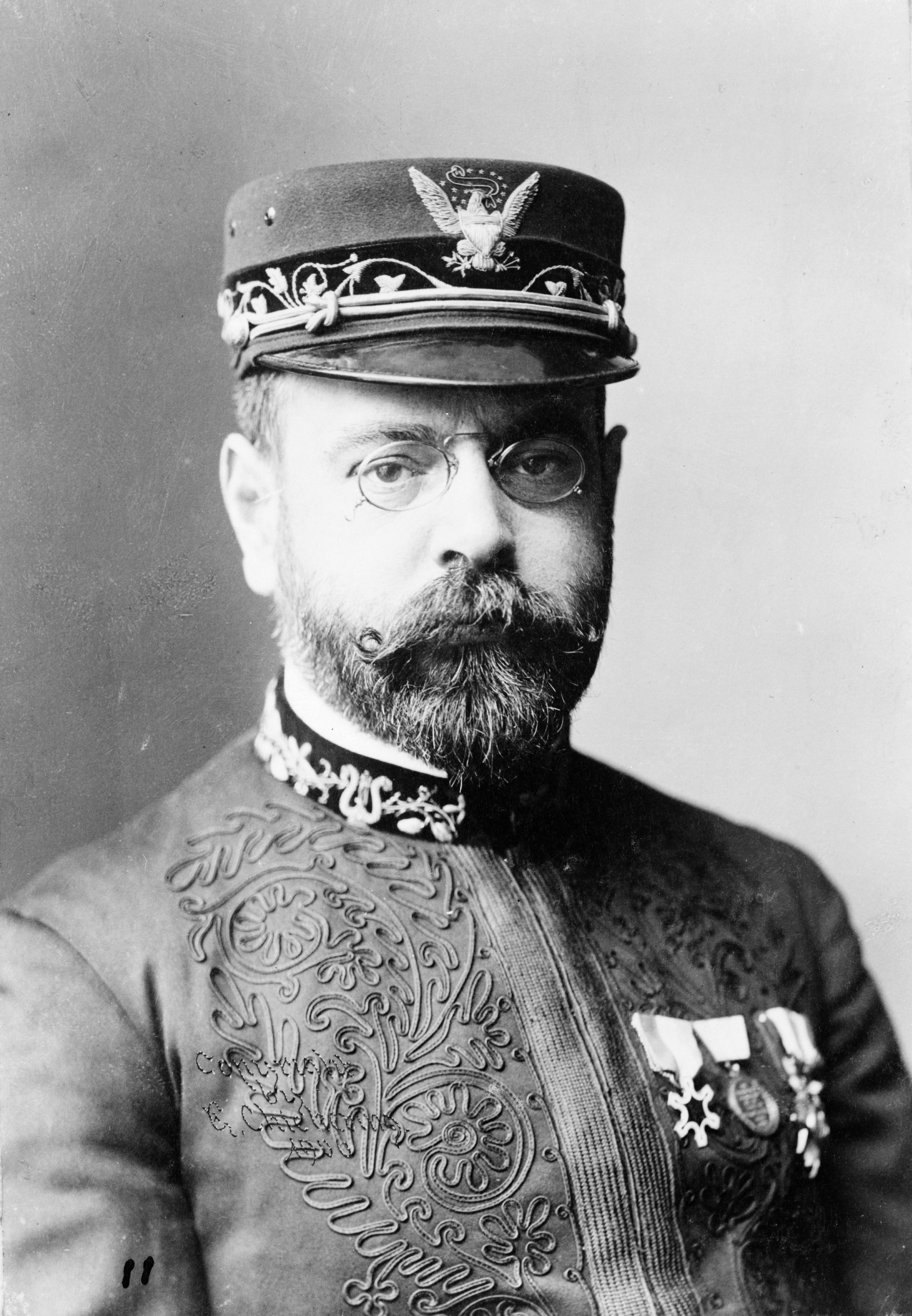
John Philip Sousa, the composer of the march.

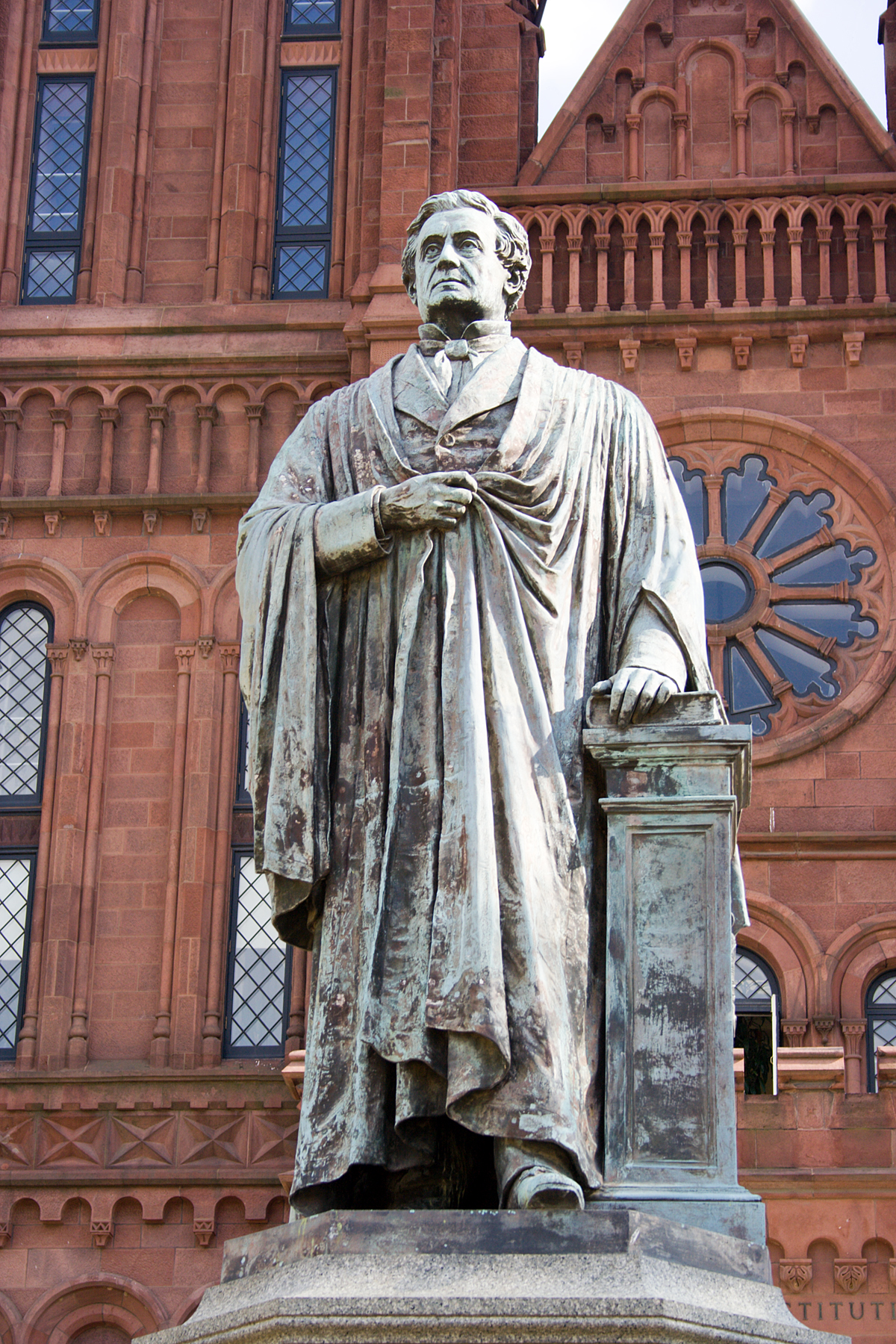
The statue of Joseph Henry, the unveiling of which was Sousa's reason for writing the march.

=== Transits of Venus ===
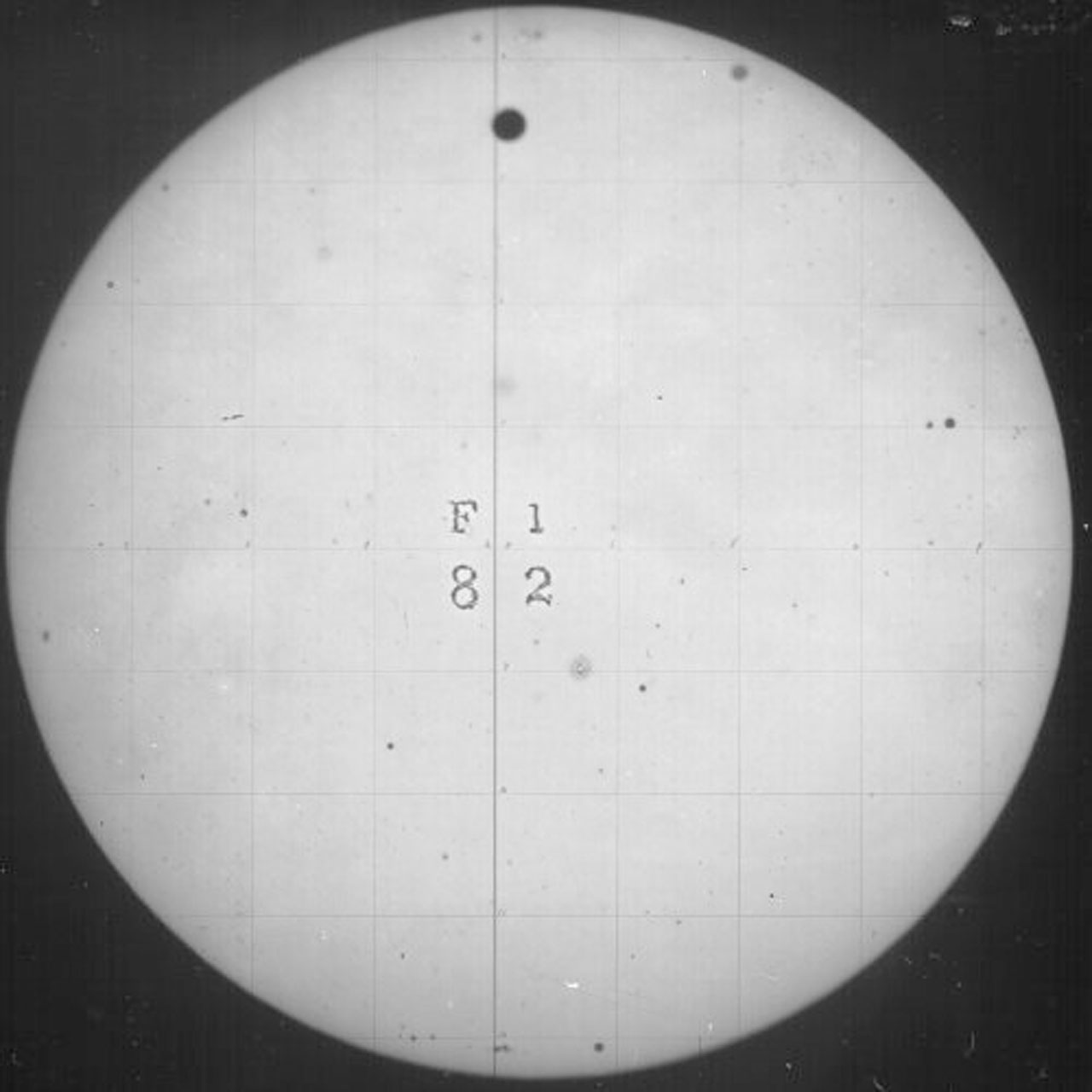
The 1882 transit, which inspired Sousa to write the march.

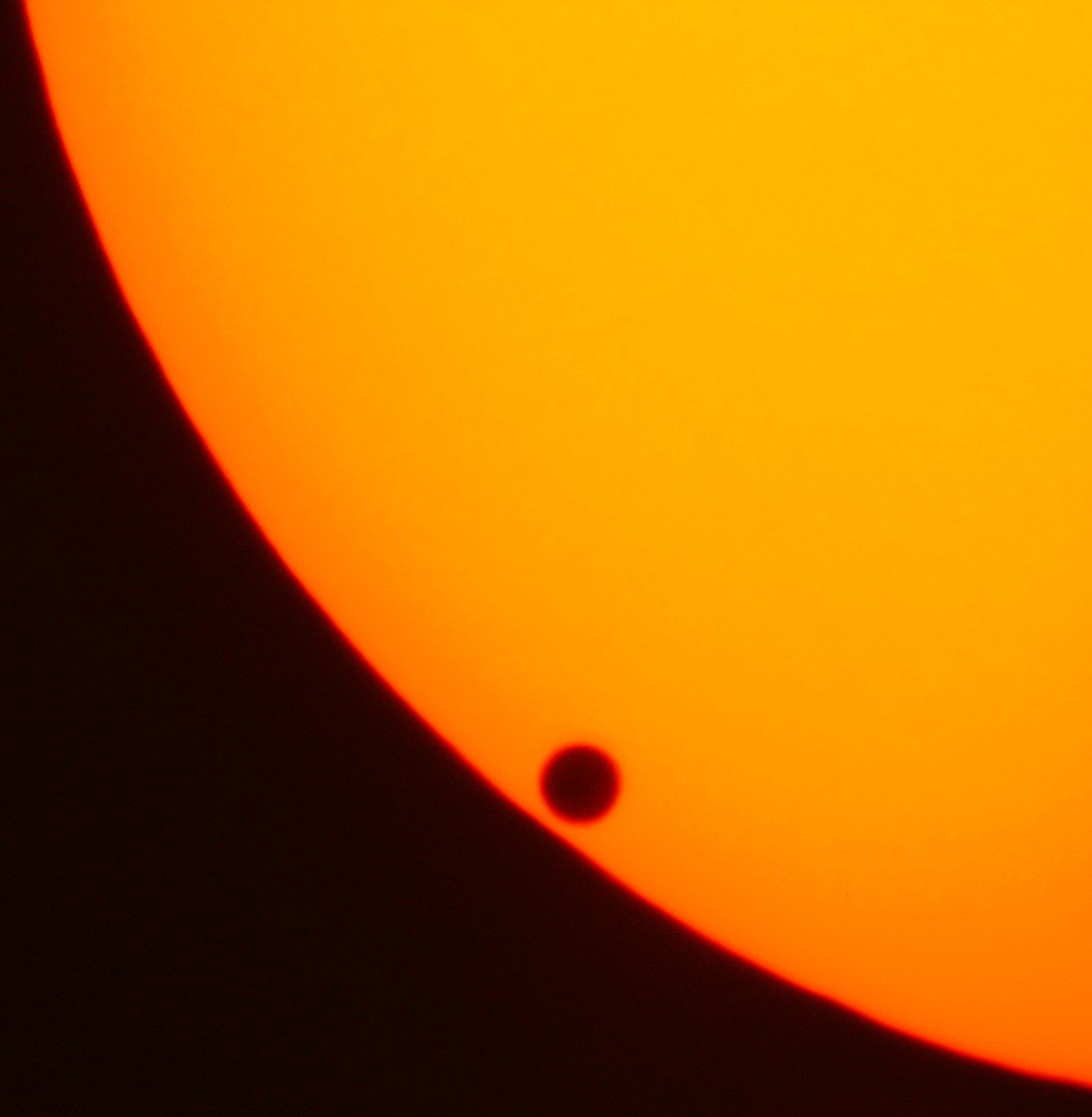
The 2004 transit. The march, rediscovered in 2003, was used to celebrate this event.

== See also ==
- List of marches by John Philip Sousa
