= Lionel Brett, 4th Viscount Esher =

British peer and architect (1913–2004)

The Right Honourable The Viscount Esher CBE
- Esher in 1965, photographed by Walter Bird

President of the Royal Institute of British Architects
- In office 1965–1967
- Preceded by: Sir Donald Gibson
- Succeeded by: Hugh Wilson

Personal details
- Born: Lionel Gordon Baliol Brett; 18 July 1913 Windsor, Berkshire, England
- Died: 9 July 2004 (aged 90)
- Spouse: Helena Christian Pike (m. 1935)
- Children: 6, including: Christopher Brett, 5th Viscount Esher
- Parent(s): Oliver Brett, 3rd Viscount Esher; Antoinette Heckscher
- Education: Eton College; New College, Oxford
- Occupation: Architect, town-planner

Lionel Gordon Baliol Brett, 4th Viscount Esher, 4th Baron Esher CBE (18 July 1913 – 9 July 2004) was a British peer, architect and town-planner. He succeeded to his title on the death of his father in 1963.

== Early life ==
Brett was born in Windsor, Berkshire, the son of Oliver Sylvain Baliol Brett, 3rd Viscount Esher and Antoinette Heckscher (1888–1965). His paternal grandparents were Eleanor (née Van de Weyer) Brett and Reginald Brett, 2nd Viscount Esher, an MP and the Constable and Governor of Windsor Castle and a close friend and adviser of Edward VII and George V. His maternal grandparents were Anna (née Atkins) Heckscher and August Heckscher (1848–1941), a German-born American capitalist and philanthropist. His grandfather married Virginia Henry Curtiss after his grandmother's death in 1924.

He was educated at Eton and New College, Oxford, where he read history.

== Career ==
He proceeded to the Architectural Association, but left to learn from the traditionalist A. S. G. Butler and then, as a non-qualified partner of William and Aileen Tatton Brown, passed the RIBA external exams in the summer of 1939, winning the Ashpitel Prize.

He spent the Second World War mostly in Britain, training gunners in the Royal Artillery, until he went through France and Belgium to witness the surrender of Lübeck and Hamburg. In 1945, he stood as Liberal parliamentary candidate for Henley, coming third in the poll.

Esher formed a partnership with Kenneth Boyd to design new houses as Architect-Planner of Hatfield New Town, Hertfordshire, and wrote the initial report of the Hatfield Development Corporation. In November 1957, some 50 of Hatfield's two-storey terraced houses lost their mono-pitched roofs in a storm, and the adverse publicity and financial liability ended his business. From this period, despite not wanting to be known as a country-house architect, he was most proud of small houses in Oxfordshire for Hans Juda and in Warwickshire for Lord Dormer. His real interest was in planning, and he carried out a study of York for the government, after which he published York: a study in conservation (1968).

He formed a second practice, Brett and Pollen, with Francis Pollen in 1959; they were later joined by Harry Teggin. He left the partnership in 1971 to take up the post of Rector of the Royal College of Art, which he held until 1978. He then returned to writing. A Broken Wave: the rebuilding of England 1940–1980 (1981) was an attempt to chronicle and analyse the achievements of post-war architecture and planning, following on from Parameters and Images: architecture in a crowded world (1970). He served as president of the Royal Institute of British Architects from 1966 to 1967.

National Life Stories conducted an oral history interview (C467/14) with Lionel Gordon Baliol Brett Esher in 1997 for its Architects Lives' collection. The recording is held by the British Library.

== Honours ==
Esher was appointed a Commander of the Order of the British Empire (CBE) in the 1970 Birthday Honours.

== Personal life ==
In 1935, he married Helena Christian Pike, a painter. She was the daughter of Colonel Ebenezer John Lecky Pike and Olive Snell. Her sister, Katherine Mary Penelope Pike, was married to Lawrence Dundas, 3rd Marquess of Zetland. Together, Lionel and Helena were the parents of:

- Christopher Lionel Baliol Brett, 5th Viscount Esher (b. 1936)
- Hon. Michael Jeremy Baliol Brett (b. 1939)
- Hon. Guy Anthony Baliol Brett (1942–2021)
- Hon. Maurice Sebastion Baliol Brett (b. 1944)
- Hon. Olivia Clare Teresa Brett (b. 1947)
- Hon. Stephen Patrick Baliol Brett (b. 1952)

The Esher family lived in Watlington Park, a country house in the Chilterns, from where Lionel Brett also ran his architectural practice. He later gave the house to his eldest son, and built a house of his own design, named The Tower, on the grounds of the estate.

Esher's autobiography Ourselves Unknown records how he nursed his wife through a long mental breakdown in the 1960s, but notes that she gave him equal support and strength over nearly 70 years.

Viscount Esher died aged 90 in 2004.

== Selected architecture ==
Notable works by the partnership of Brett, Francis Pollen and Harry Teggin include:

- 190–192 Sloane Street, Chelsea, showrooms and offices, 1963–1965
- Pall Mall Court, Manchester, offices, 1966–1968
- Library at Downside Abbey, Somerset, 1965–1970
- Refectory and guest accommodation, east wing, Downside Abbey, 1970–1975

== Arms ==
Coat of arms of Lionel Brett, 4th Viscount Esher
Crest A lion passant Gules charged on the shoulder with a cross botonny fitchéee Or and holding in the dexter forepaw a fasces Proper. Escutcheon Quarterly 1st & 4th Gules within an orle of crosses botonny fitchée Or a lion rampant of the last holding in the dexter forepaw a fasces erect Proper 2nd per pale Or and Gules three leopard's faces counterchanged 3rd Azure three bears' heads couped Argent muzzled Gules. Supporters Dexter a boar sinister a lion both Sable and each charged on the shoulder with a cross botonny fitchée Or and holding between the paws a fasces erect Proper. Motto Vicimus

Peerage of the United Kingdom
Preceded by Oliver Sylvain Baliol Brett	Viscount Esher; 1963–2004	Succeeded by Christopher Lionel Baliol Brett
