= Harry de Windt =

British explorer and travel writer (1856–1933)

Captain Harry de Windt FRGS
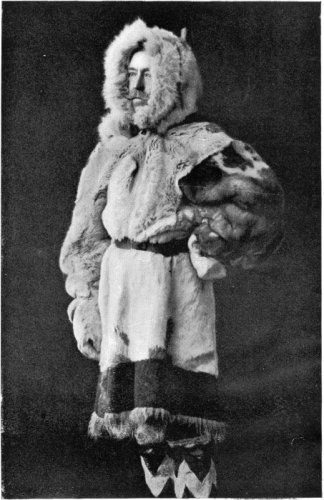
- Harry de Windt pictured in his From Paris to New York by Land
- Born: Harry Willes Darell de Windt; 9 April 1856; Paris, France
- Died: 30 November 1933 (aged 77); Bournemouth, England
- Education: Magdalene College, Cambridge
- Spouse(s): Frances Laura Arabella Long (m. 1882; div. 1888) Hilda Frances E. Clark (m. 1899; died 1924) Charlotte Elizabeth Ihle (m. 1927; died 1933)
- Children: Margaret Maude de Windt
- Parent: Joseph Clayton Jennyns de Windt
- Relatives: Margaret Brooke (sister)

Captain Harry Willes Darell de Windt FRGS (9 April 1856 – 30 November 1933) was an explorer and travel writer. His books were published under the name of Harry de Windt.

== Early life ==
Harry de Windt was born on 9 April 1856 in Paris. He was the son of Capt. Joseph Clayton Jennyns de Windt, of Blunsdon Hall, between Swindon and Highworth in Wiltshire, England, and Elizabeth Sarah Johnson. Among his siblings was sister Margaret Alice Lili de Windt, who married Charles Brooke.

He was admitted to Magdalene College, Cambridge in 1875, but did not take a degree, travelling with his brother-in-law.

== Career ==
From 1876 to 1878, de Windt served as aide-de-camp to his brother-in-law, Charles Brooke, Rajah of Sarawak.

In April 1897, while attempting to travel by land from New York to Paris, he became seriously ill at Paris after enduring exposure and poor treatment at Tchuktchis, Bering Strait. In July 1902, he reached Dawson after traveling from Siberia on a river steamer with Viscount Desclinchams, Belgrade of Paris, George Harding (an English photographer), and Stephen Rastorguyef (a Russian from Yakutakat who "the Russian government insisted should accompany De Windt through the wilds of Siberia").

== Personal life ==
On 18 July 1882 at St George's, Hanover Square in London, Harry married Frances Laura Arabella Long, sister of Walter Long, 1st Viscount Long. The couple had a daughter, Margaret, in 1884 and divorced in 1888. He married Hilda Frances E. Clark, who died, without issue, in 1924. Three years later he married the actress Charlotte Elizabeth Ihle, better known by her stage name Elaine Inescourt.

Harry died at Bournemouth on 30 November 1933.

== Works ==
- On the equator (1882)
- From Pekin to Calais by land (1889)
- A ride to India across Persia and Baluchistan (1891)
- The New Siberia. London: Chapman and Hall. 1896.
- Through the gold-fields of Alaska to Bering Straits (1898)
- True tales of travel and adventure. Chatto. 1899.
- From Paris to New York by land (1903), 1904 2nd printing
- Through Savage Europe; Being the Narrative of a Journey (undertaken as Special Correspondent of the Westminster Gazette), throughout the Balkan States and European Russia; With one hundred illustrations. London: T. Fisher Unwin. 1907 – via Internet Archive.
- Moles and their Meaning. London: C. Arthur Pearson Ltd. 1907.
- My note-book at home and abroad. E. P. Dutton and co. 1923.
