= List of Sarawakian royal consorts =

A consort of the Sarawak is a person married to a White Rajah of Sarawak during his reign. All spouses of the rajahs of Sarawak have been titled "Ranee of Sarawak" (from Malay راني rani ultimately from Sanskrit राज्ञी rā́jñī) with the style Her Highness.

== Consorts of Sarawak ==
Picture	Name	Father	Birth	Marriage	Became Consort	Ceased to be Consort	Death	Spouse
	Margaret Alice Lili de Windt	Joseph Clayton Jennyns de Windt	1849	28 October 1869	28 October 1869	17 May 1917 husband's death	1936	Charles Brooke
	Sylvia Leonora Brett	Reginald Brett, 2nd Viscount Esher	25 February 1885	21 February 1911	24 May 1917 husband's ascension	1 July 1946 monarchy abolished	11 November 1971	Charles Vyner Brooke

== See also ==
- Kingdom of Sarawak
- White Rajahs
- Sultanate of Sarawak
