= Margaret Brooke =

Margaret
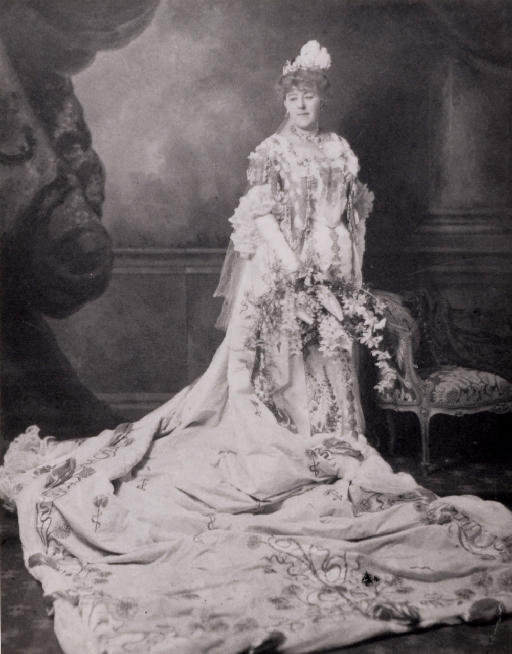
- Portrait of Margaret of Sarawak wearing her royal attire, around 1910.

Ranee of Sarawak
- Tenure: 28 October 1869 – 17 May 1917
- Born: Margaret Alice Lili de Windt; 9 October 1849; Paris, France
- Died: 1 December 1936 (aged 87); London, England, UK
- Spouse: Charles Brooke
- Issue: Dayang Ghita Brooke; James Harry Brooke; Charles Clayton Brooke; Charles Vyner Brooke; Bertram Brooke; Harry Keppel Brooke
Names
- Margaret Alice Lili de Windt
- House: White Rajahs (by marriage)
- Father: Joseph Clayton Jennyns de Windt
- Mother: Elizabeth Sarah Johnson

Margaret, Lady Brooke, Ranee of Sarawak (born Margaret Alice Lili de Windt; 9 October 1849 – 1 December 1936) was the Ranee of the second White Rajah of Sarawak, Charles Anthony Johnson Brooke. She published her memoir, My Life in Sarawak, in 1913. The memoir offers a rare glimpse of life in The Astana in Kuching and colonial Borneo. The Ranee became legendary during her lifetime as a woman of strength and intelligence, as well as on account of her status, which she shared with the other White Rajahs, of being at once a British subject and an Asian monarch.

== Life ==
Born Margaret Alice Lili de Windt, she was the daughter of Captain Joseph Clayton Jennyns de Windt, of Blunsdon House (between Swindon and Highworth, in Wiltshire, England), and Elizabeth Sarah Johnson. Her younger brother, Harry de Windt, was well known to the west at that time as an explorer and travel writer.

She married Rajah Charles, at 20 years old, at Highworth on 28 October 1869. After the marriage, Rajah Charles automatically appointed her the title of Ranee of Sarawak with the style of Her Highness. She was the first to hold the position, the previous White Rajah, James Brooke being unmarried. The Astana was built for her as a wedding present by her spouse. Ranee Margaret Brooke was described in her book as intelligent, forceful, non-sentimental and with the ability to dominate by her presence. Though her relationship with Charles soon deteriorated, she secured an independent position for herself and left Charles in the 1880s.

Her first three children died within a week of each other on board ship in the Red Sea in 1873, while returning to England with the Rajah. The couple married again, hoping to give birth to another three children. They separated and living estranged, with Rajah Charles living in Sarawak and Margaret in London, where she was at the centre of a social circle that included several of the leading literary talents of the 1890s, such as Oscar Wilde and Henry James. She financed the education of her sons by selling the diamond Star of Sarawak, and arranged the marriages of her sons by organising glamorious social events for the British aristocracy and introducing her sons to daughters of the British nobility to marry. Her appointed title of ranee or queen gave her family a position in London society.

== Compositions ==
Margaret Brooke composed the national anthem of Sarawak, Gone Forth Beyond the Sea, in 1872.

== Legacy ==
Fort Margherita, in Kuching, was named after her.

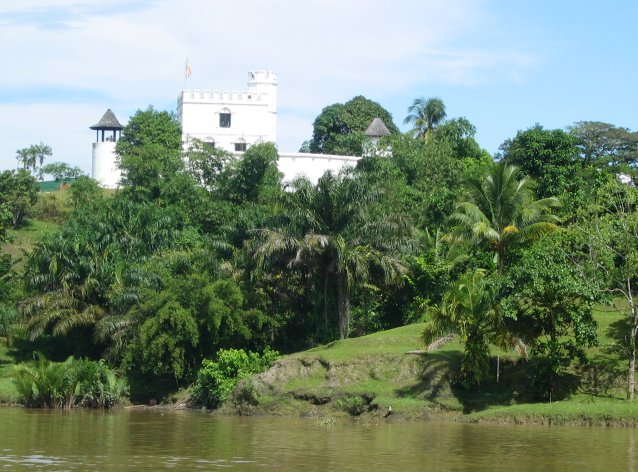
Fort Margherita was erected by Rajah Charles and named after his wife, the Ranee Margaret

One of Oscar Wilde's fairytales, "The Young King", is dedicated to "Margaret, Lady Brooke, The Ranee of Sarawak".

== Works ==
- My Life in Sarawak (Methuen & Co., 1913)
- Impromptus (Edward Arnold, 1923)
- Good Morning & Good Night (Constable & Co., 1934)

== See also ==
- List of Sarawakian consorts
- White Rajahs
- Kingdom of Sarawak

== Sources ==
- Koninklijk Genootschap voor Geslacht- en Wapenkunde, Nederlandse Genealogieen 11, Den Haag 1996 (Literature regarding Broek-De Wind)
- M. R. H. Calmeyer, de Wind, de Windt, de Wint, Name: De Nederlandsche Leeuw; Location: The Nederlands; Date: 1981;, Pag 23. Co - Author Mr. O. Schutte.

Margaret Brooke Brooke family Born: 1849 Died: 1936
Regnal titles
New title	Ranee of Sarawak; 1869–1917	Succeeded by Sylvia
