= Oliver Brett, 3rd Viscount Esher =

British peer and politician

The Right Honourable The Viscount Esher GBE FRSL FRIBA
- Esher in 1930 by Walter Stoneman
- Born: Oliver Sylvain Baliol Brett; 23 March 1881; Windsor, Berkshire, England
- Died: 8 October 1963 (aged 82)
- Education: Eton College
- Spouse: Antoinette Heckscher (m. 1912)
- Children: 4, including Lionel Brett, 4th Viscount Esher
- Parent(s): Reginald Brett, 2nd Viscount Esher; Eleanor Van de Weyer
- Relatives: Sylvain Van de Weyer (grandfather)

Oliver Sylvain Baliol Brett, 3rd Viscount Esher, GBE, FRSL, FRIBA (23 March 1881 – 8 October 1963) was a British peer and politician.

== Early life ==
Brett was the elder son of the Liberal courtier and politician Reginald Brett, 2nd Viscount Esher, the Governor of Windsor Castle, and Eleanor Van de Weyer, daughter of Belgian ambassador Sylvain Van de Weyer and grand-daughter of Anglo-American financier Joshua Bates. His siblings included Maurice Vyner Baliol Brett, who married the famous musical theatre actress Zena Dare; Dorothy, who was a painter and member of the Bloomsbury Group; and Sylvia, who became the last Ranee of Sarawak on 24 May 1917, following the proclamation of her husband Charles Vyner Brooke as Rajah.

He was educated at Eton. Brett was a friend of his eventual wife's brother, G. Maurice Heckscher.

== Career ==
He was an unpaid private secretary to Lord Morley, the Secretary of State for India, from 1905 to 1910. In the January and December 1910 elections he unsuccessfully stood for Huntingdon as a Liberal. In 1914, he joined the 1/16th (County of London) Battalion (Queen's Westminster Rifles), and was attached to the War Office. For his wartime service he was appointed a Member of the Order of the British Empire (Military Division) in 1918.

He succeeded his father, who was a close personal friend of King Edward VII and King George V, as Viscount Esher in 1930.

Esher was chairman of the general purposes committee of the National Trust for 25 years, and of its historical buildings committee from its inception in 1934. He was also involved with many cultural and artistic charities, including the Society for the Protection of Ancient Buildings, the London Museum, the Historic Churches Trust, and the Old Vic. He was also a Fellow of the Royal Society of Literature and an honorary Fellow of the Royal Institute of British Architects.

In 1955, he was promoted a Knight Grand Cross of The Order of the British Empire "for services to the Arts".

== Personal life ==
In September 1912, Brett sailed to New York aboard the RMS Campania in advance of his wedding. While talking to a New York Times reporter, he said that he "knew nothing about the wedding arrangements except the date, and did not even know who was to be the best man. None of his friends, so far as he knew, was going over to the wedding, as the distance was too far. It was suggested that in these days of fast liners the distance was short. He answered: 'It is to English people.' He smilingly denied that the absence of friends from the station implied family opposition to the marriage, and added: 'Why should there be?'".

On 1 October 1912, the then Hon. Oliver Brett was married to the American-born Antoinette Heckscher (1884–1967) at Wincoma, the country home of her parents in Huntington on Long Island in New York. Antoinette was the daughter of German-born August Heckscher, who made his fortune in zinc mining with the New Jersey Zinc Company before entering the New York real estate business. Her paternal grandparents were Johann Gustav Heckscher, a German politician who was the Minister of Justice in the provisional German government headed by Archduke John of Austria, and Marie Antoinette (née Brautigan) Heckscher. After their marriage, the couple first made their home at Orchard Lea, Windsor Forest, until acquiring the Watlington Park country house in the Chilterns in 1920. Together, Esher and Antoinette were the parents of:

- Lionel Brett, 4th Viscount Esher (1913–2004), a former president of the Royal Institute of British Architects.
- Hon. Virginia Anne Charlotte Brett (1916–1990)
- Hon. Nancy Mildred Gladys Brett (1918–1999), who married Sir Evelyn Shuckburgh, the British Ambassador to Italy.
- Hon. Priscilla Leónie Helen Brett (1921–2000), who became Lady Beckett upon her marriage to Sir Martyn Gervase Beckett, 2nd Bt.

Lord Esher died on 8 October 1963 at which time he was succeeded in his titles by his son, Lionel. His widow died less than two years later, on 22 July 1965.

== Arms ==
Coat of arms of Oliver Brett, 3rd Viscount Esher
Crest A lion passant Gules charged on the shoulder with a cross botonny fitchéee Or and holding in the dexter forepaw a fasces Proper. Escutcheon Quarterly 1st & 4th Gules within an orle of crosses botonny fitchée Or a lion rampant of the last holding in the dexter forepaw a fasces erect Proper 2nd per pale Or and Gules three leopard's faces counterchanged 3rd Azure three bears' heads couped Argent muzzled Gules. Supporters Dexter a boar sinister a lion both Sable and each charged on the shoulder with a cross botonny fitchée Or and holding between the paws a fasces erect Proper. Motto Vicimus

Peerage of the United Kingdom
Preceded by Reginald Brett	Viscount Esher; 1930–1963	Succeeded by Lionel Brett
