= Vygon (UK) =

Vygon (UK) Ltd
- Type: Limited company
- Industry: Health care
- Founded: 1973
- Founder: Pierre Simonet
- Headquarters: Swindon, UK
- Key people: Les Davies, MD
- Revenue: ▲£54Million GBP (2011)
- Website: www.vygon.co.uk

Vygon (UK) Ltd is the largest subsidiary in terms of turnover (£54 million in 2011) of the French medical devices Vygon SA, which specializes in the design, manufacture, and distribution of medical and surgical devices. It is based in Swindon, Wiltshire and operates throughout the United Kingdom. The company was founded in 1973 and originally based in Cirencester, Gloucestershire, until its relocation to The Pierre Simonet Building, Swindon in 2011. In 2012 it achieved ISO 9001 and ISO 13485 accreditation and certification for its Management Systems.

The company's product portfolio includes a wide range of products such as catheters, cannulas, and other devices for use in critical care, anaesthesia, neonatology, and other specialist areas.

== History ==
Vygon SA was founded in Écouen by Belgian engineer Pierre Simonet in 1962. In 1968 Vygon SA opened the first subsidiary in Germany, and in 1970 more manufacturing sites were opened in France, Germany and Belgium.

Vygon (UK) Ltd was founded in 1973 with its headquarters in Cirencester, Gloucestershire. It opened another two sites in South Cerney, Gloucestershire in 2009, before relocating the whole business to the former Motorola Groundwell building in Swindon. Vygon renamed its new premises The Pierre Simonet Building, in honour of Vygon's original founder. Vygon is run by Stephane Regnault, husband of Pierre Simonet’s granddaughter.

At present, the Vygon group as a whole has 26 branches, 11 production facilities and approximately 2,780 employees. The group produces around 210 million medical products annually and markets them in 120 countries worldwide. In the 2024 fiscal year, Vygon achieved global revenue of €417.9 million. In the United States, Vygon is among the tenants of manufacturing and office facility in Worcester, Pennsylvania.

== Environmental ==
Vygon (UK) Ltd claims to support Principles 7, 8 and 9 of the United Nations Global Compact concerning the environment, which includes: following the precautionary approach set out in the Rio Declaration; encouraging initiatives to promote greater environmental responsibility; and encouraging development and diffusion of environmentally friendly technologies.

== Products ==
Vygon's product ranges extend across many therapeutic specialities, including vascular access, regional anaesthesia, IV management, neonatology and enteral feeding. It distributes the MIC ranges of enteral feeding products throughout the UK on behalf of Kimberly-Clark.

In 2012 Vygon launched Curos Port Protectors into the UK, which it distributes on behalf of Ivera Medical.

== Awards ==
In 2015, the company was awarded the Investors in People accolade, becoming one of the 8% of companies who have succeeded in being accredited by Investors in People (IiP) after applying.
