= Brett, Boyd and Bosanquet =

British architectural firm

Brett, Boyd and Bosanquet were a partnership of British architects, known particularly for their post-war church designs in southern England.

The founders were Lionel Brett (1963–2004), Kenneth Boyd and Peter Bosanquet (died 2005).

Brett and Boyd also collaborated on two New Towns: Hatfield and the Ghyllgrove estate in Basildon.

== Churches ==
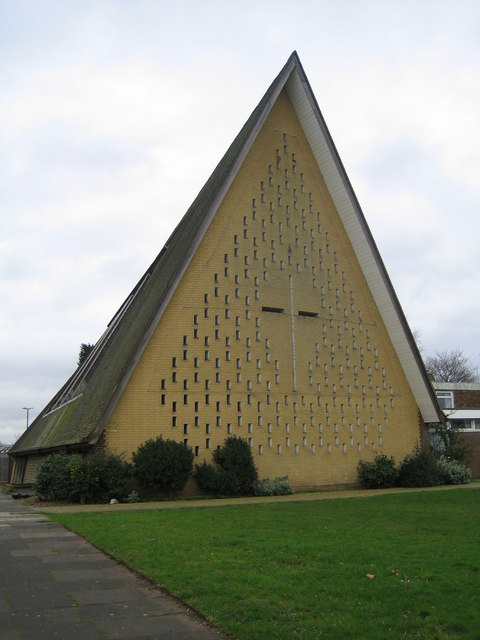
The Church of St John in Hatfield.

- Christ the King, Sonning Common
- Church of St George, Letchworth (Grade II listed)
- St John the Evangelist, Hatfield
- St Matthew's, Wigmore
