= Beauforest House =

House in Newington, Oxfordshire, England

Coordinates: 51°39′52″N 1°07′17″W

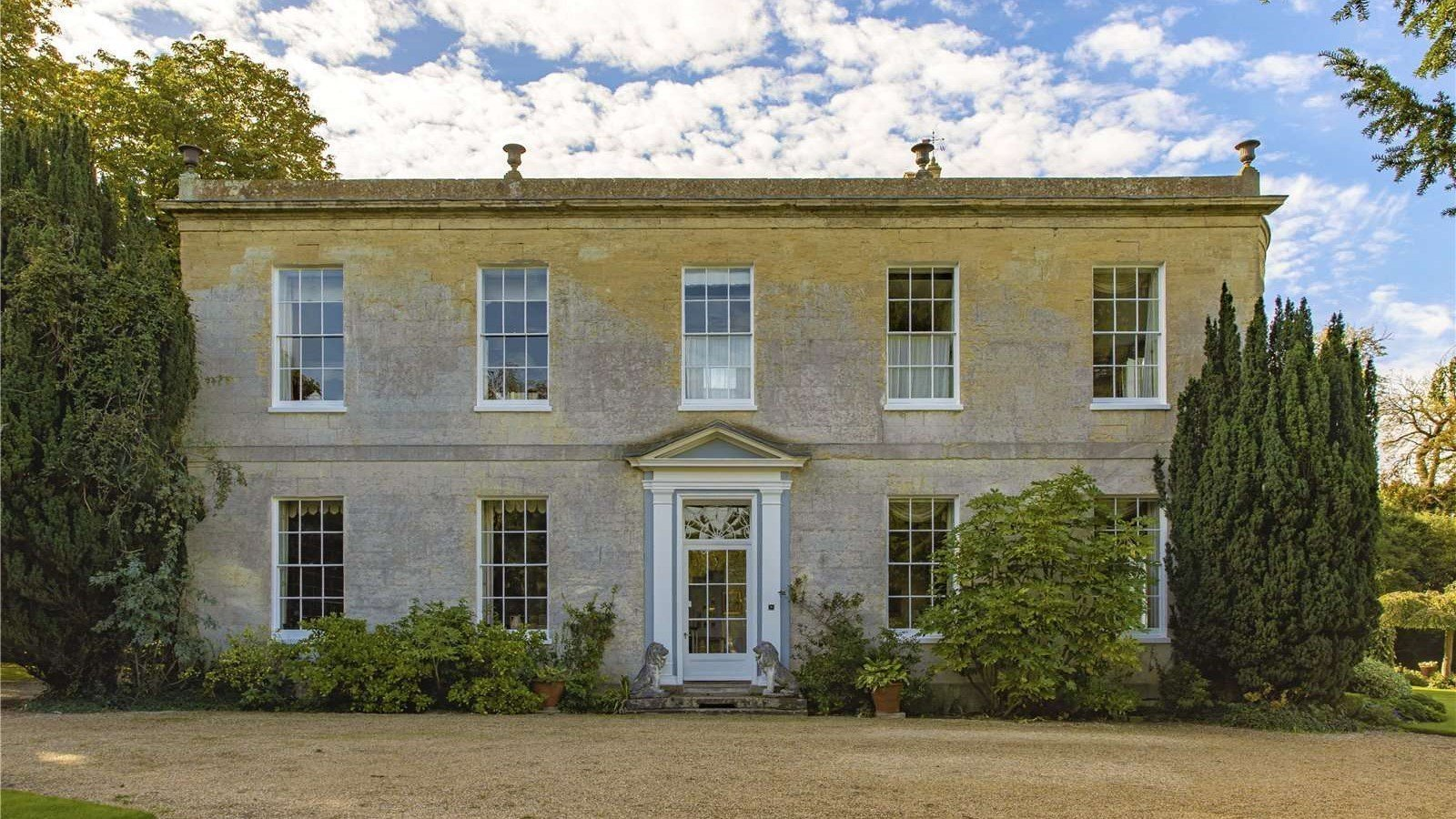
Beauforest House

Beauforest House is a historic house, near Newington, Oxfordshire, England.

It has been listed Grade II on the National Heritage List for England since 1963.

It is a former rectory and dates back to about 1500, and was extended in the late 18th century and again in about 1800.

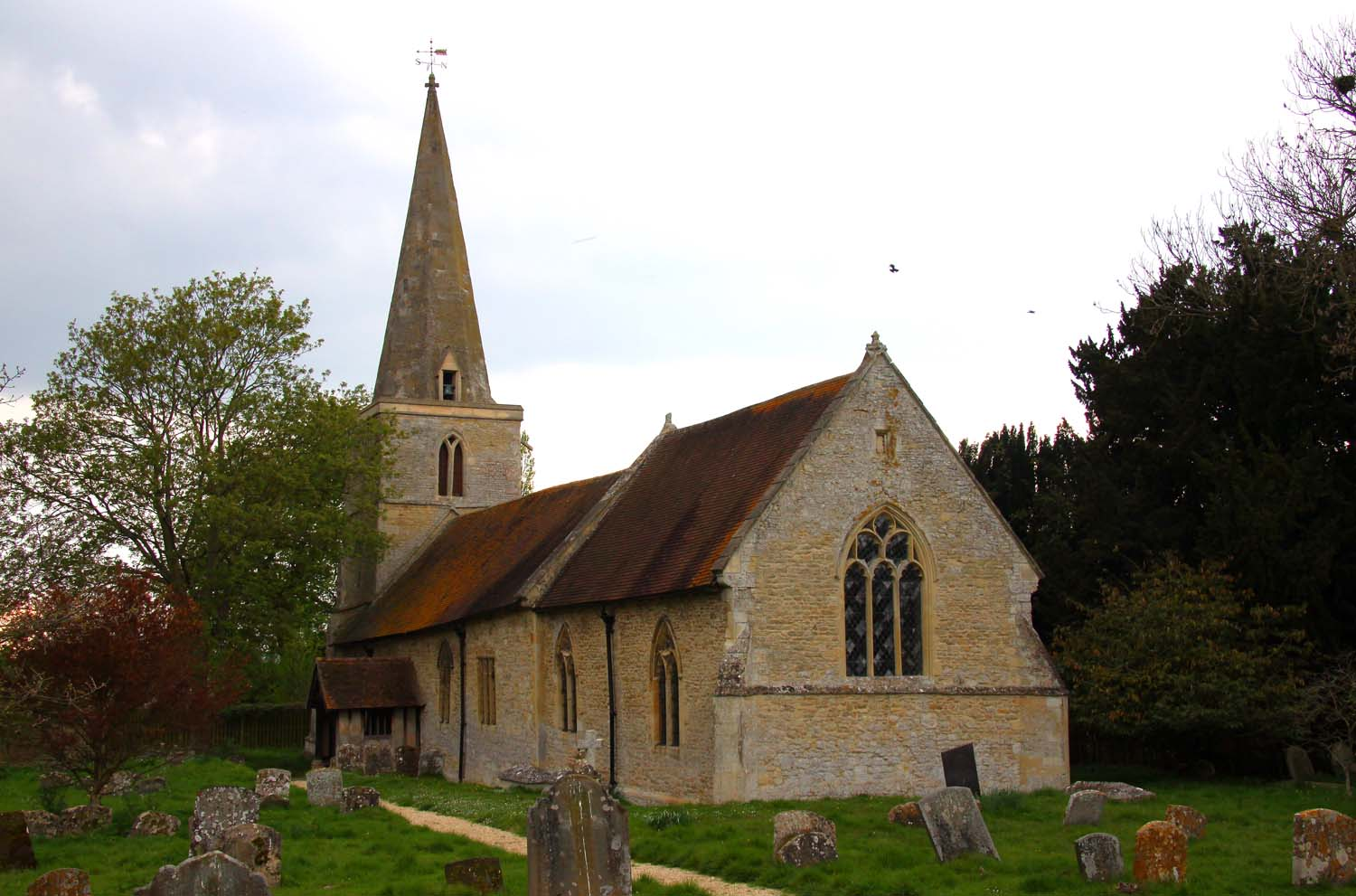
Beauforest House is very close to St Giles Church in Newington

In 1951, The Rectory, as it was then known, was sold to art historian and administrator Sir John Rothenstein, who renamed it Beauforest House. In 2014, it was owned by Christopher Brett, 5th Viscount Esher.

As of November 2021, it is for sale at £4.5 million.
