= Church architecture in England =

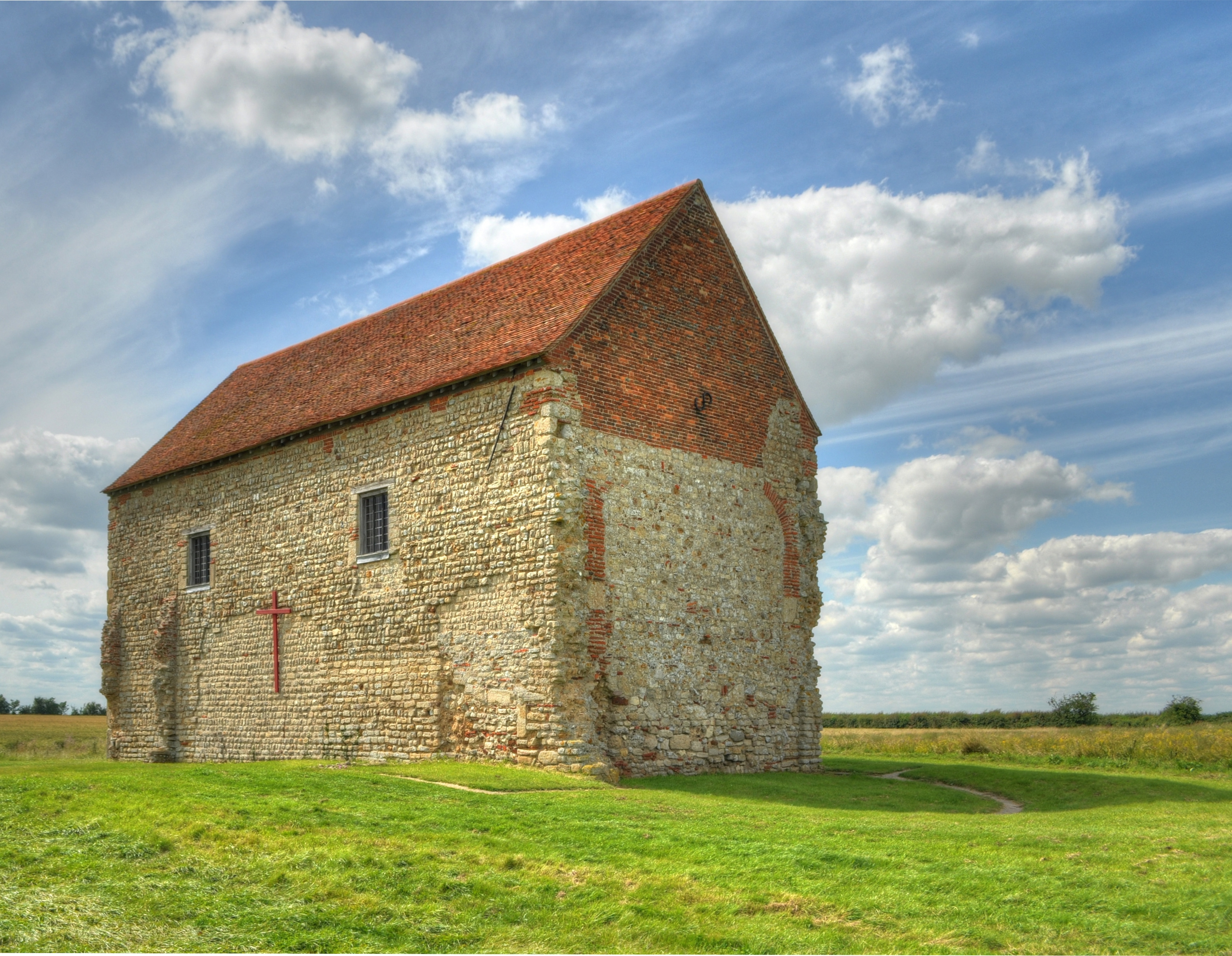
St Peter-on-the-Wall (660-662) in Bradwell-on-Sea, Essex, one of the oldest surviving churches in England

Church architecture of England refers to the architecture of buildings of Christian churches in England. It has evolved over the two thousand years of the Christian religion, partly by innovation and partly by imitating other architectural styles as well as responding to changing beliefs, practices and local traditions. Christian architecture encompasses a wide range of both secular and religious styles from the foundation of Christianity to the present day, influencing the design and construction of buildings and structures in Christian culture. From the birth of Christianity to the present, the most significant period of transformation for Christian architecture and design was the Gothic cathedral.

== The Saxon and Norman periods ==
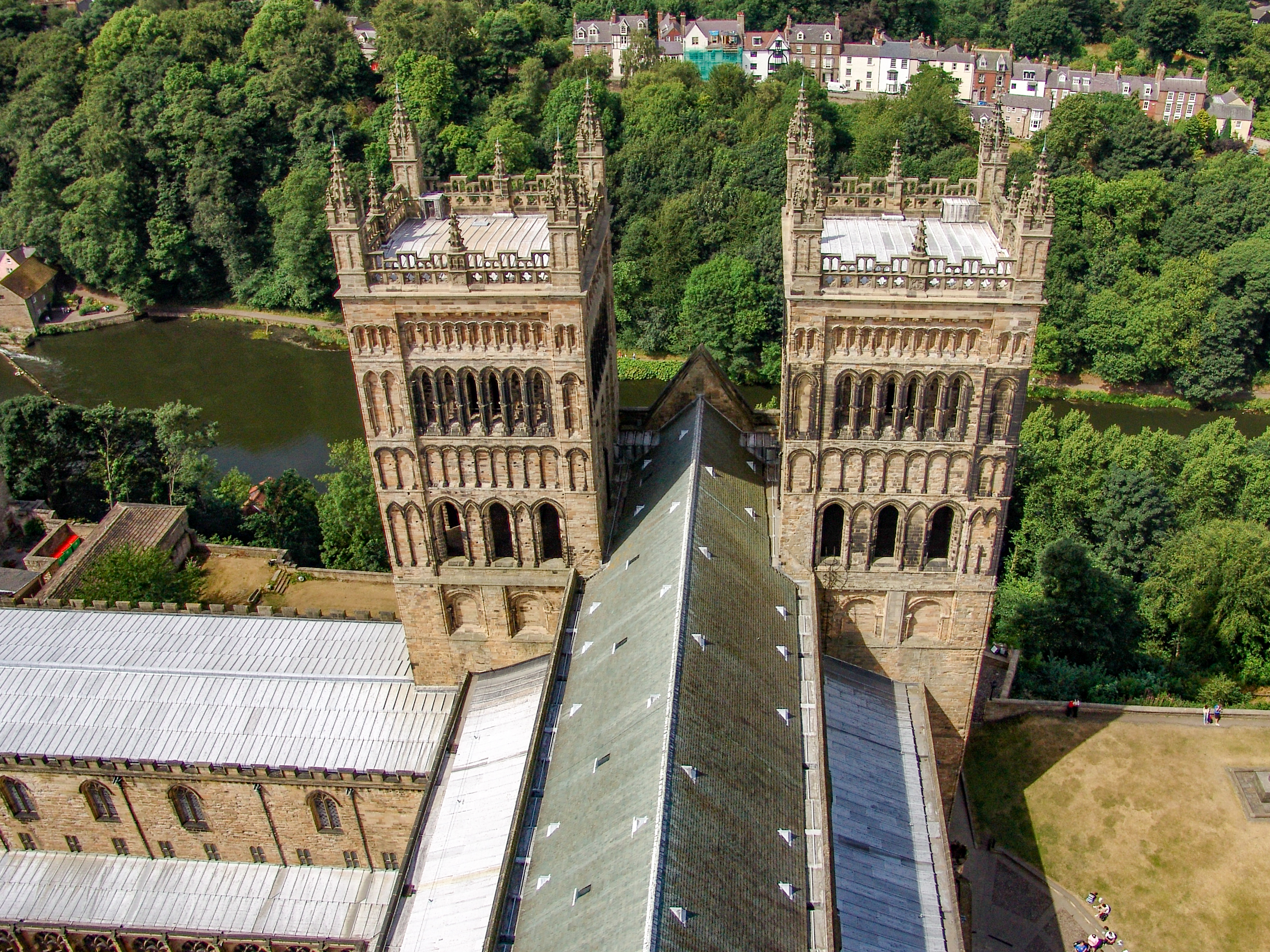
Roof and Towers of Durham Cathedral (1093-1135)

In England, Saxon churches still survive in some places, the oldest example being the Church of St Peter-on-the-Wall, Bradwell-on-Sea. But with the Norman conquest, increasingly the new Romanesque churches, often called Norman in England, became the rule. These were massive in relation to the space they enclosed, their walls pierced by windows with semi-circular arches. Internal vaulting used the same shaped arch. Unsupported roofs were never very wide. Yet some of these buildings were huge and of extraordinary beauty. The Abbey church of St. Mary Madgalene at Vézelay in Burgundy and Durham Cathedral in England are two very different examples of this form.

== The Middle Ages ==
The next development was due to the mobility of the master masons whose work this was. They followed the Crusades and built their own churches in the Holy Land, most notably the Church of St. Anne in Jerusalem. However, they also noticed that the local Muslim architecture deployed the much more flexible two-point or Gothic arch. The semi-circular arch was heavy and, in spite of this, resulted in weaknesses when two barrel vaults intersected. The 'gothic arch' on the other hand was stronger and could be used to make for wider unsupported spaces.

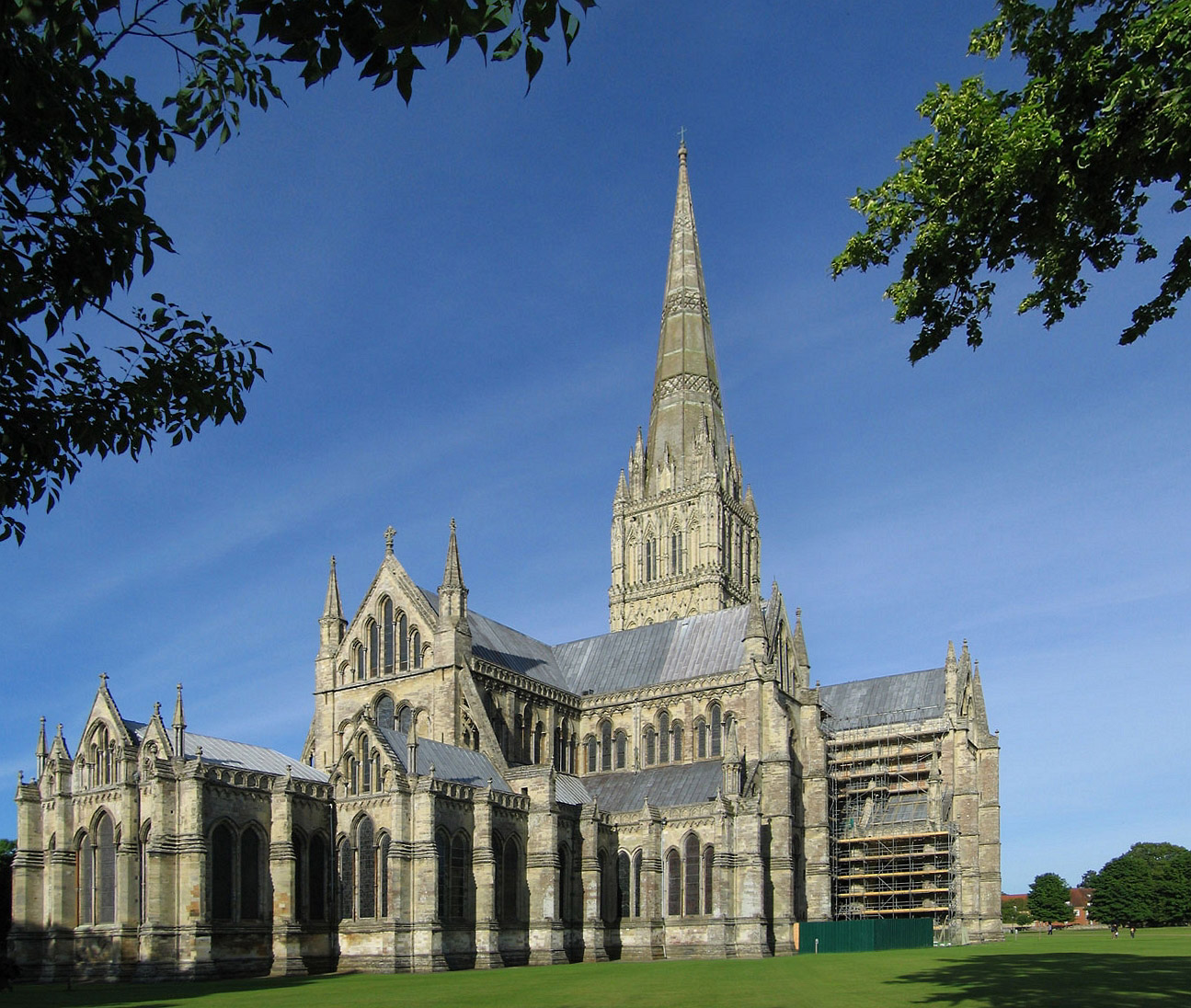
Salisbury Cathedral completed 1265

Thus there came to Europe, first the narrow, lancet window, often found in pairs or triplets, called in England the Early English style (here seen at Salisbury Cathedral). Examples of parish churches include Eaton Bray in Bedfordshire and West Walton in Norfolk; it is most commonly found in the southeastern counties. The style was spare, simple and monastic in character with little carving The period is reckoned by Pevsner to run from about 1190 to 1250. In spite of its name the style was at one time called the French style and it is to be found all over the British Isles.

By the late thirteenth century, more daringly ornate styles of tracery were tried – the so-called Decorated, dating from 1290 to 1350. Initially geometric, using circles as well as the two point arch, it derived from the French Rayonnant style. However, it slowly became more daring and flowing; the name curvilinear has been ascribed to it. Windows became larger, increasing the number of mullions (the vertical bars dividing the main part of the window) between the lights; above them, within the arch of the window, the tracery was formed using shapes styled 'daggers' and 'mouchettes', trefoils and quatrefoils; completely circular rose windows were made, incorporating all manner of shapes. More formal reticulated (netlike) tracery can also be found, as in Wells Cathedral. Exotic forms included the ogee arch, in which the curves of the arch are reversed in the upper part thus meeting at an acute angle at the apex; others included so-called Kentish tracery with its insertion of spikey points between the rounded lobes of trefoils and quatrefoils. Larger windows inevitably weakened the walls which were now supported by large exterior buttresses which came to be a feature. Columns forming the arcades within churches of this period became more slender and elegant, the foliage of the capitals more flowing. Examples of the earlier form include the choir and chapter house of Westminster Abbey and the north transept of Hereford Cathedral; later forms include the nave of York Minster. The octagon at Ely, a timber framed lantern tower over the crossing, demonstrates the adventurousness of the developed style. But it can be seen in parish churches from Snettisham and Aylsham in Norfolk to Beverly in Yorkshire and Madley in Herefordshire. There were undoubtedly many more examples but many were replaced by later developments.

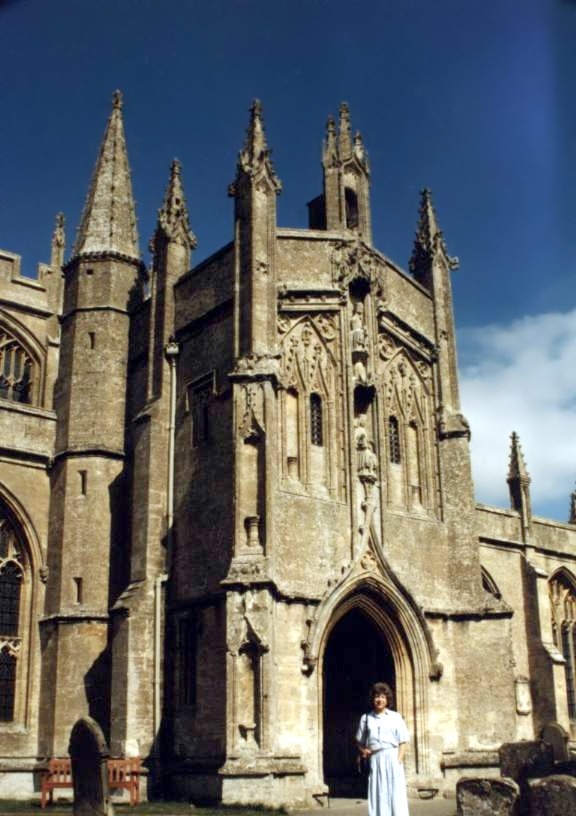
Ornate two-storey "Perpendicular"-style south porch of 1480 at Northleach, Gloucestershire

Finally, the Perpendicular style (so-called because the mullions and transoms were vertical and horizontal) allowed huge windows, often filled with stained glass. The style, so described runs from about 1330, initially in parallel with the Decorated style, until 1530. Sometimes criticised as over formal, the spaces allowing for glass were huge. Another feature was that doorways were often enclosed by squared mouldings and the spaces between the moulding and the door arch – called spandrels were decorated with quatrefoils etc. Ornate stone ceilings, using so-called fan vaulting, made for huge unsupported spaces. King's College Chapel, Cambridge has magnificent specimens of these. Meanwhile, the Lady Chapel of Ely Cathedral has an unsupported stone ceiling approximately 30 feet by 80 feet, using a star formation of lierne vaults and bosses.

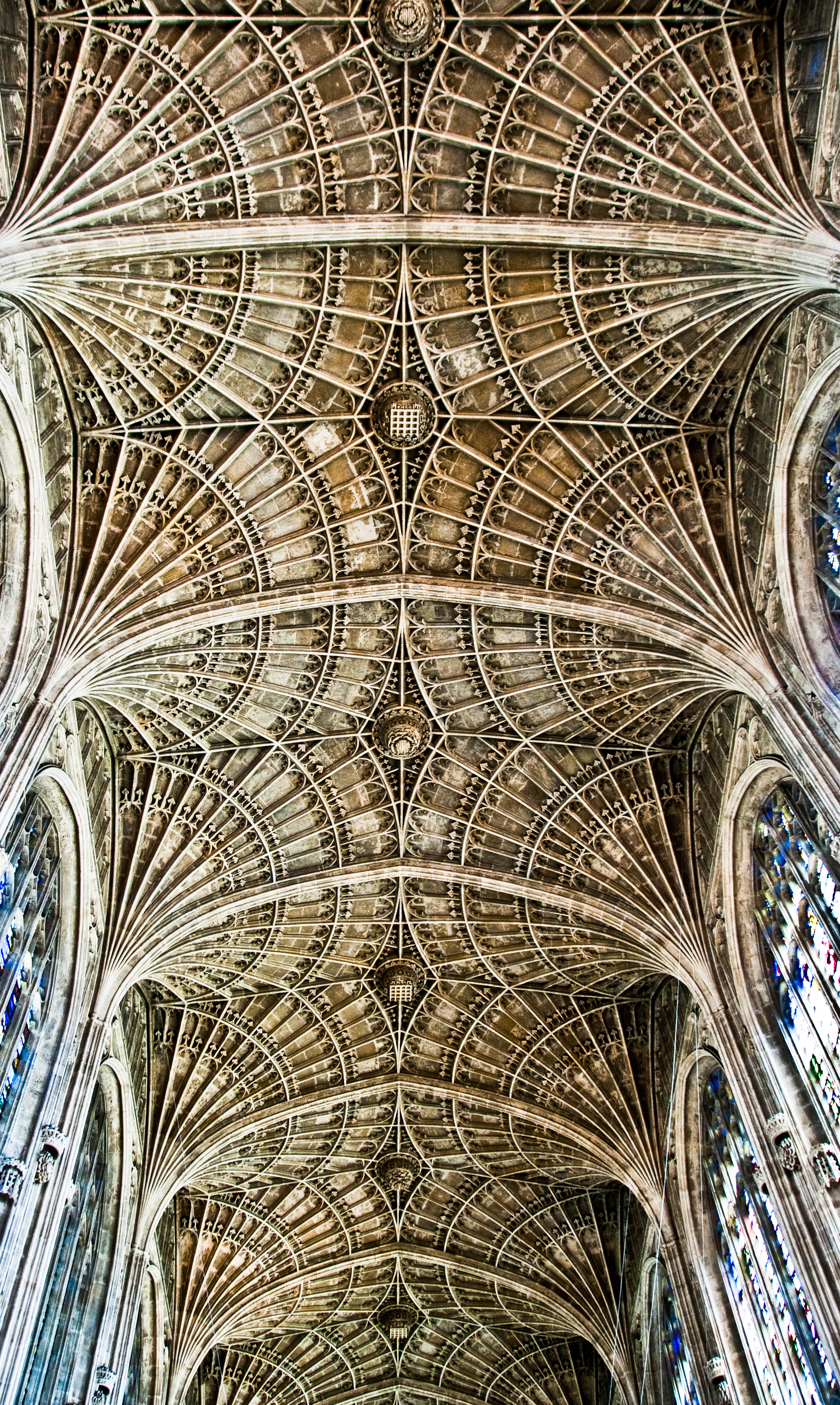
Fan Vaulting (1512-1515), King's College Chapel, Cambridge

The late mediaeval period saw an unequalled development in church architecture in England. Walls became thinner; solid buttresses became more elegant flying buttresses surmounted by pinnacles; towers, often surmounted by stone spires became taller, and more decorated, often castellated; internal pillars became more slender; unsupported spaces between them wider; roofs, formerly safely steeply pitched became flatter, often decorated with carved wooden angels and a bestiary, where they were steep they were supported by carved hammer beams; windows occupied more and more of the wall space; decorative carving more freely flowing; figures multiplied, particularly on the west fronts of cathedrals and abbeys. Finally with the cessation of the wars with the French and the apparent ending of the Wars of the Roses with the return of Edward IV in 1471, there was more money around so that new buildings could be put up and existing buildings enlarged. "Hardly had such towers risen on all sides; never had such timber roofs and screens been hewn and carved..." (Harvey) This is the period of the building of wool Churches like Long Melford and Lavenham and of King's College Chapel in Cambridge.

The interiors of mediaeval churches, apart from their many altars and stained glass (which, of course can only be properly seen from inside) had their purpose made visually plain by the almost universal presence of roods, huge figures of the crucified Christ, high above the congregation, mounted on a rood loft at the chancel arch -with steps to enable the priest to climb up; something which no one could miss. A wooden rood screen beneath might have painted on it figures of the apostles and angels.

== The Protestant Reformation ==
With the reign of Henry VIII all of this was to be first put in question and then to come to a shuddering halt. On his death, and the accession of Edward VI almost all of the internal decoration was to be destroyed. The chantries and guilds which supported them became illegal or their functions taken from them. Images were removed, Saints' days massively reduced. The Churches echoed to the sound of hammer blows as stone altars and images were smashed, glass broken, font covers and roods and their screens torn down and burnt. Those who had formerly been benefactors were more wary, given the changes of direction of governmental policy which was to last more than 150 years. They spent their money on great houses instead.

== The auditory church ==
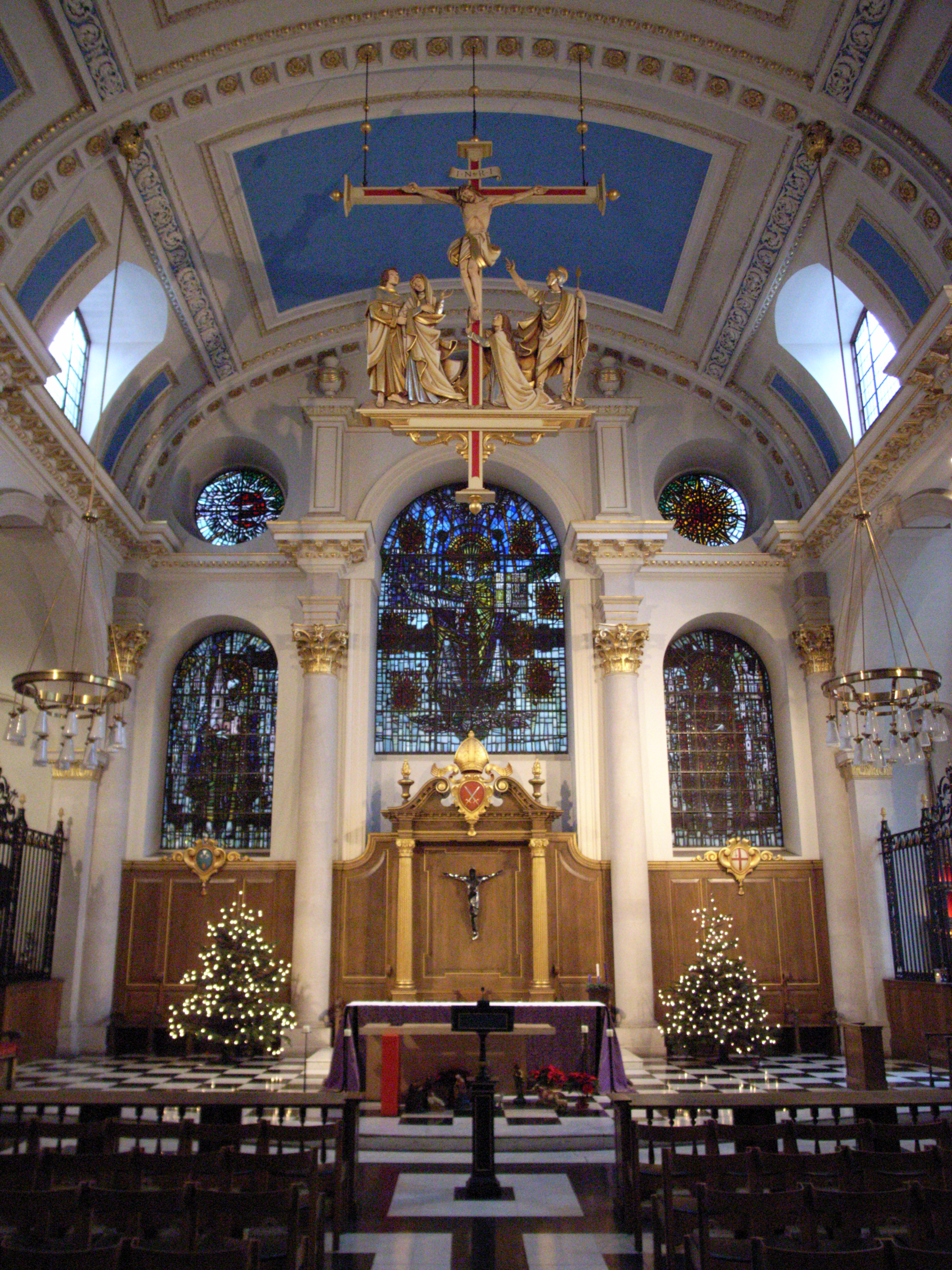
Interior of a Wren Church: St Mary-Le-Bow (1671-1673) in central London

In the seventeenth century, across Western Europe, a return was seen towards the single-room church in which everything could be seen. In Protestant countries these were somewhat simple and, among the finest examples, from an architectural point of view were the churches of Sir Christopher Wren. This was a one-room design in which altar and pulpit were both visible. Churches were to be sufficiently small, including galleries, so that all could see what was taking place. Chancels were suppressed, screens were deemed unnecessary obstructions. Buildings had three defined centres: the font (by the door), the pulpit and reading desk, and the altar. Within Lutheranism similar principles obtained. The Prinzipalstück ideal was of an oblong building without a chancel, with a single space at the east end combining all liturgical acts: baptism, service of the word and communion. These ideas, with variations, were to affect the building of nonconformist chapels in seventeenth-century England. Galleries increased the capacity without increasing the distance between worshipper and preacher.

== The Royal Arms – a distinctive feature in English churches ==
Two notable heraldic features started appearing in English churches during the sixteenth and seventeenth centuries. One of these was the funerary hatchment, which was basically a coat of arms displayed on either a black or a black and white lozenge, and commemorated a notable local person.

The other was a representation of the Royal Arms, a feature of Anglican churches, representing the monarch's role as head of the Church of England. The arms has been made in several different forms. It has been done as a painting, as an embroidery, or as a relief made out of wood, stone or iron.

The usage of the Royal Arms in English churches originated in the mediaeval period, in places associated with the English monarchy. A classic surviving example is the arms of Henry VI in King's College Chapel, Cambridge.

After the Reformation, it became customary to display the Royal Arms as a symbol of the sovereign's role as Head of the Church. The arms was traditionally positioned above the altar, as a replacement for the rood screen. Over time, however, churches would have the arms located wherever the parishioners would deem appropriate – over the chancel arch, on a side wall, or over the west door.

Mary I, as a Roman Catholic, ordered the Royal Arms to be removed from churches and kept hidden away, but the features were brought back and improved under her successor, Elizabeth I. Oliver Cromwell was the only other ruler who discouraged the use of the Royal Arms.

The usage of the Royal Arms in English churches started to decline in the 1830s, owing to the Victorian fashion for "Christianisation", and as a consequence, few English churches built from Victorian times onwards use the arms.

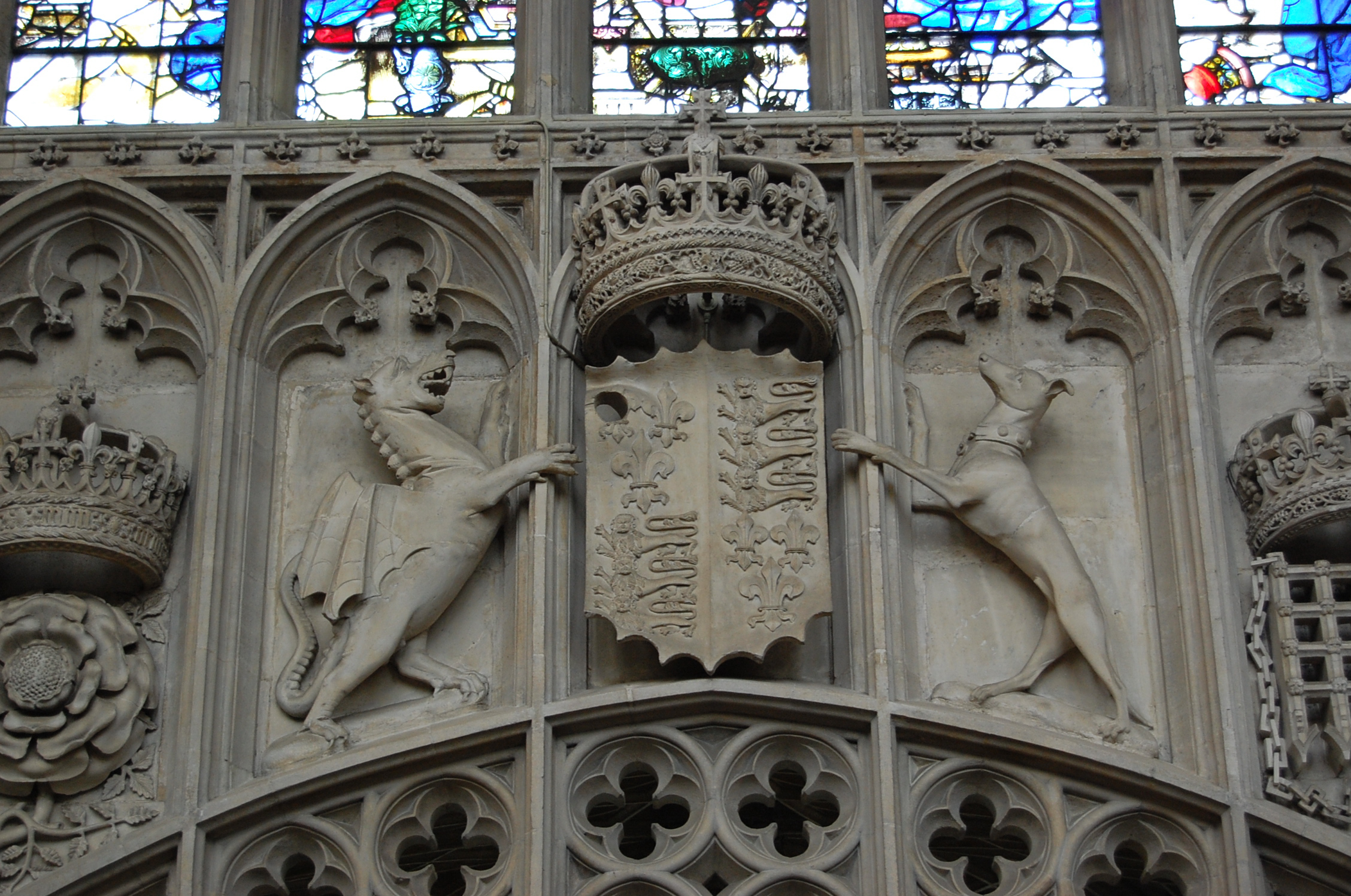
King's College Chapel, Cambridge

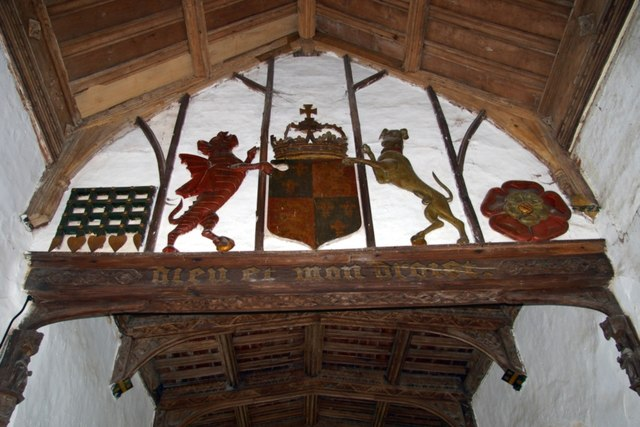
Arms of Henry VIII, in Rushbrooke Church, Suffolk

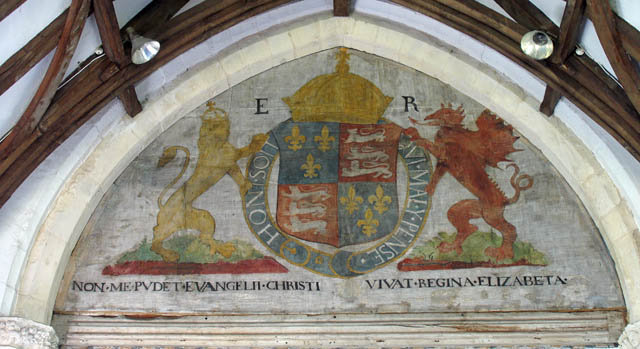
Elizabethan Royal Arms in the church of Ludham, Norfolk

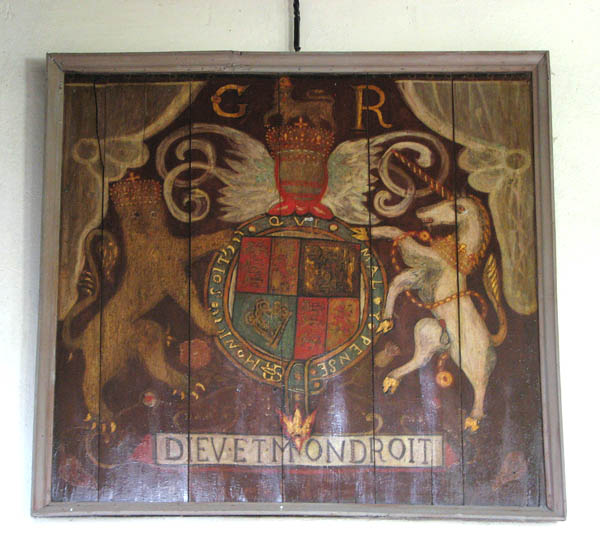
Arms of Charles I in Kenninghall church, Norfolk

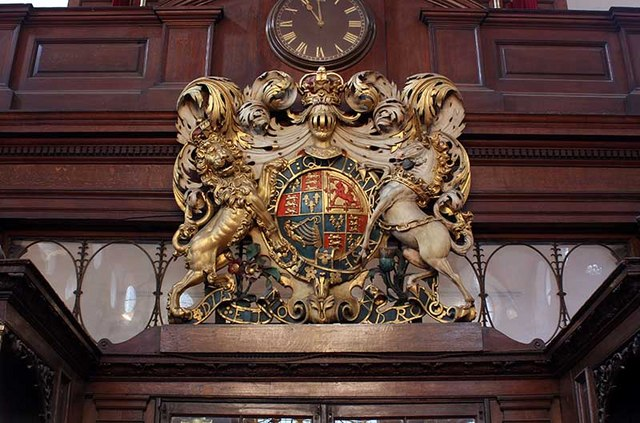
Arms of Charles II in Wren's St Margaret Pattens, London

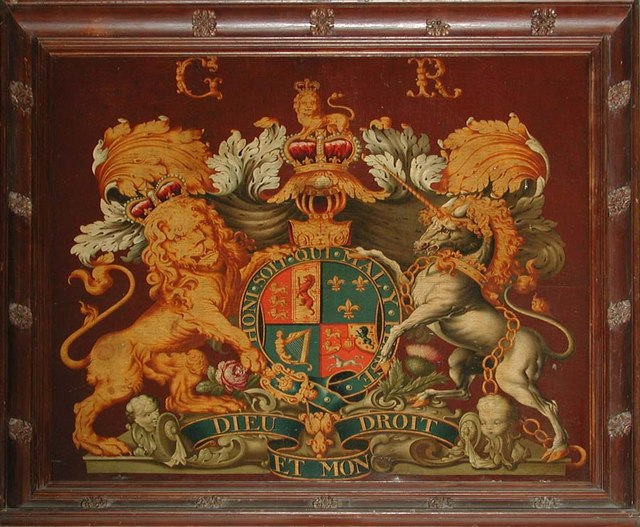
Hanoverian Royal Arms in the church at Begbrooke, Oxfordshire

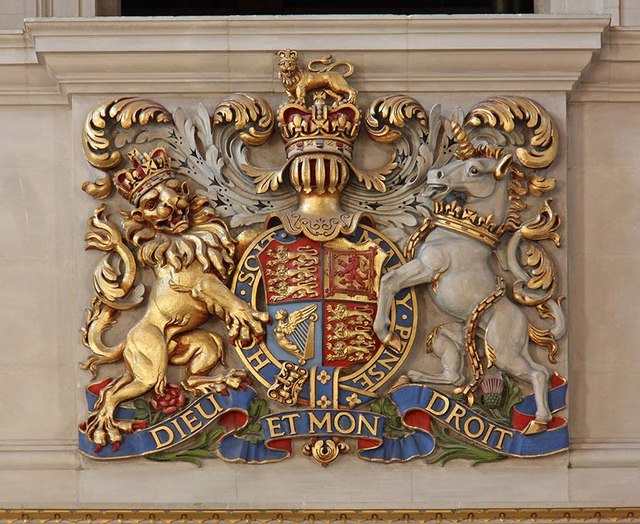
A modern form of the Royal Arms at St Bride's Church, London

== Gothic Revival ==
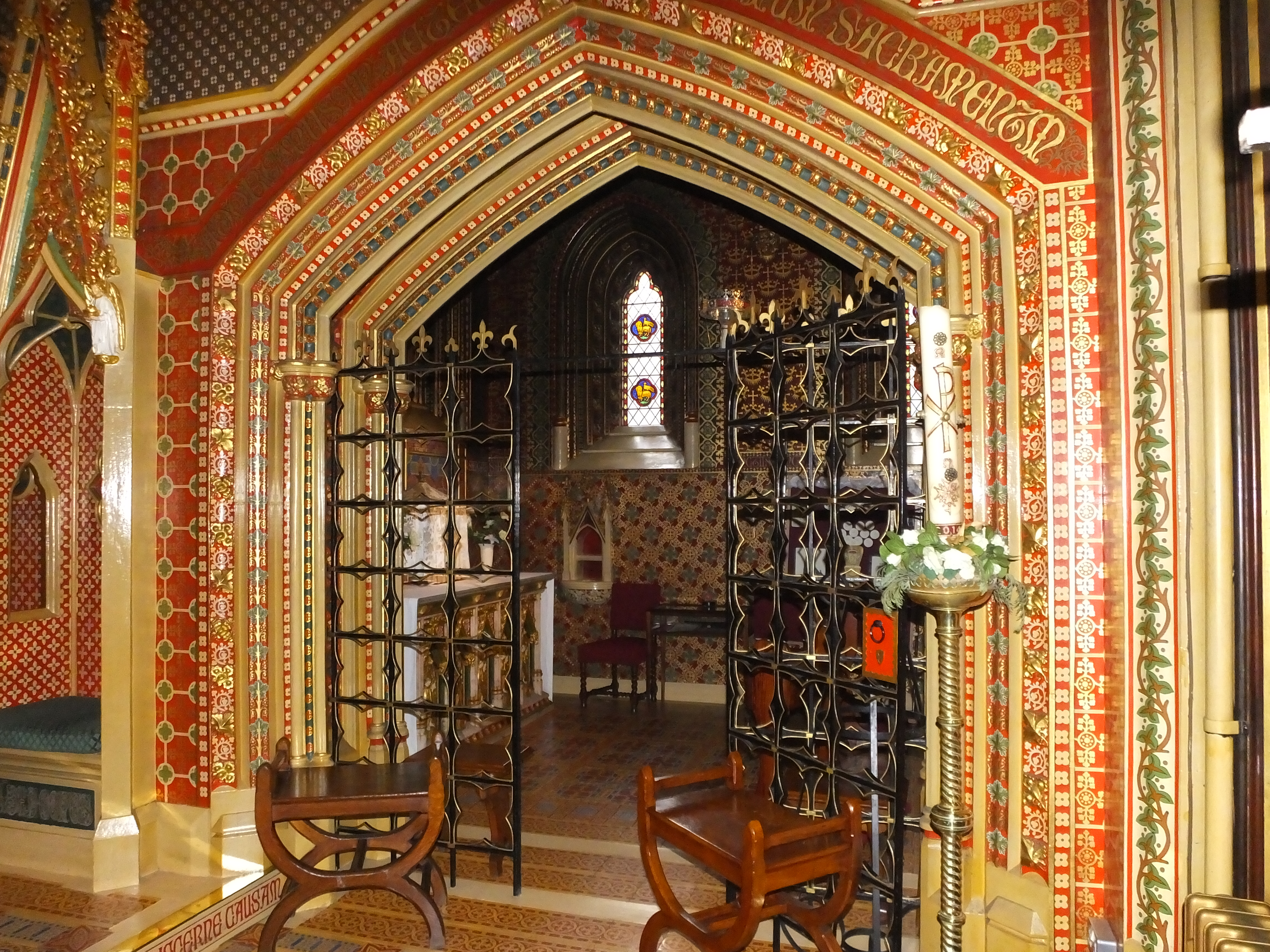
Interior of St Giles' Catholic church, Cheadle

In the nineteenth century, in England as elsewhere, more money became available for new churches. Gothic revival styles became popular and as urban populations grew, major neo-Gothic churches were built to accommodate them. The passing of the Catholic Relief Act allowed the construction of new churches for England's Roman Catholics, and these were also done in the neo-Gothic style. Finally, this style, in a modified form, was also used for the design of Methodist and other Nonconformist churches, which were also increasing in number during this time.

The usage of tracery, buttresses with carved pinnacles, tiled roofs and glazing formed one feature of church architecture in the Victorian era, while a deep chancel, with an arch and crucifix, formed another. Although this was not unusual for Roman Catholic churches, it seemed alien to the Church of England, but was nevertheless adopted.

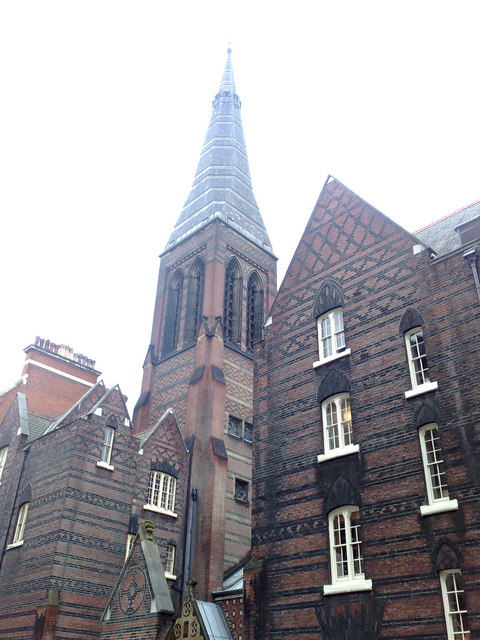
All Saints Margaret Street, London

During this time, individual architects began to make their influence felt on the churches they built in England. One of the earliest was Augustus Pugin, who designed Roman Catholic churches; however, few of his works are appreciated today except for St Giles' Church at Cheadle in Staffordshire.

Architects of the mid-Victorian era who brought the Gothic style to perfection, both in church interiors and church exteriors, included William Butterfield and George Gilbert Scott. Two notable churches by the respective architects are the church of All Saints, Margaret Street in London and All Souls Church in Halifax, West Yorkshire.

The later Victorian era saw the influence of the Arts and Crafts movement, and the churches of this period returned to the less flamboyant styles of the early nineteenth century. The finest churches were often funded by private individuals. Notable architects of this time included George Frederick Bodley, whose most distinguished design is St Mary's Church at Eccleston in Cheshire, and Richard Norman Shaw, whose masterpiece is the Church of St Michael and All Angels in Bedford Park, London.

== 20th Century ==
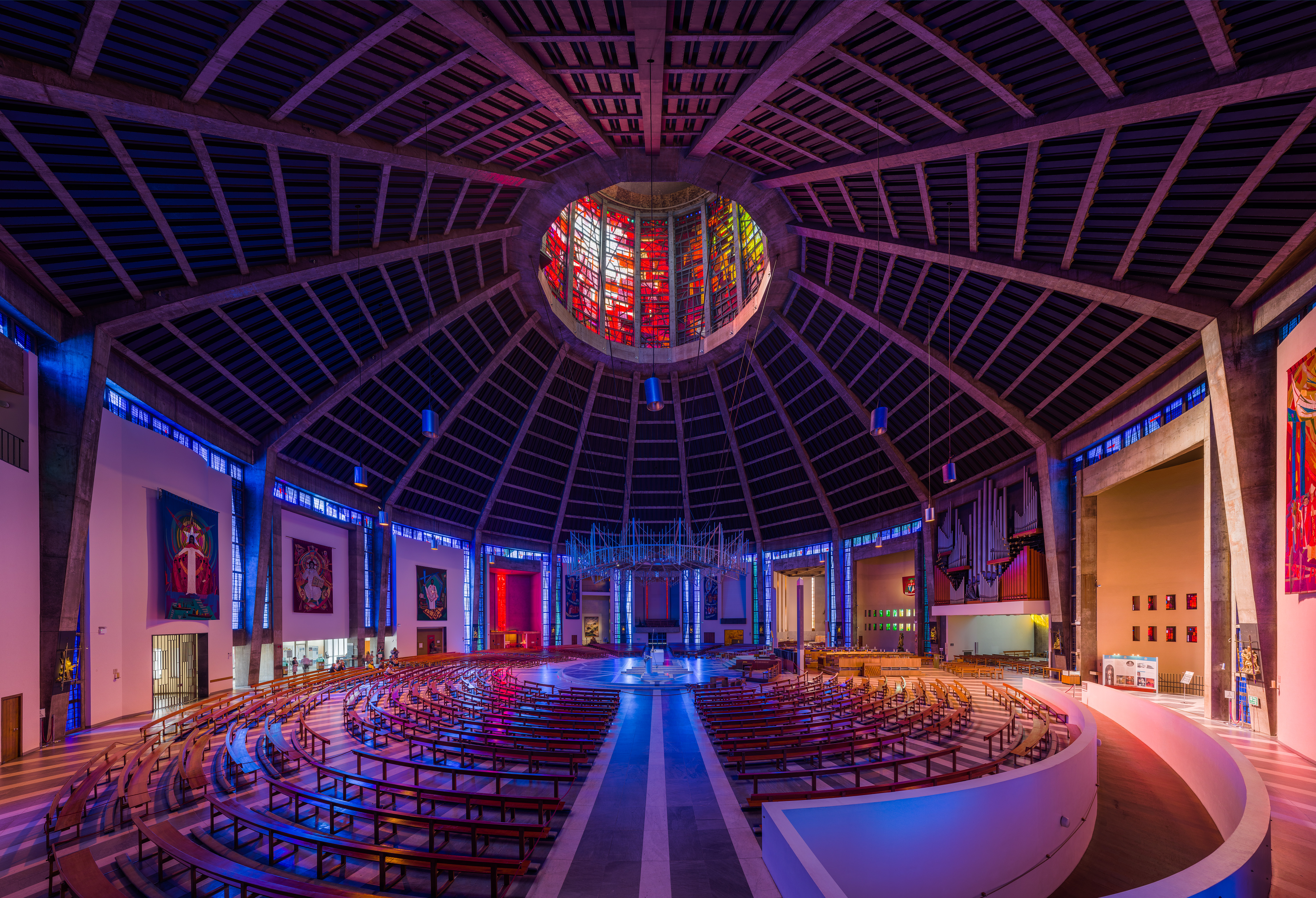
New cathedrals were built in the second half of the 20th century including Liverpool Metropolitan (pictured), Coventry and Clifton.

New churches continued to be built in the 20th century in the modernist and later Brutalist styles. Two main drivers were the reconstruction or replacement of churches bombed in World War II, and the New Towns movement. Notable C20 church architects include Giles Gilbert Scott, Basil Spence, Nugent Cachemaille-Day, Robert Maguire & Keith Murray and Brett, Boyd and Bosanquet.
