= Sylvia Brett =

Lady Brooke, Ranee of Sarawak (1885–1971)

Sylvia Leonora
- Portrait by Paul Tanqueray, 1930

Ranee of Sarawak
- Tenure: 24 May 1917 – 1 July 1946

Grand Master of The Most Excellent Order of the Star of Sarawak
- Tenure: 1 August 1941 – 1 July 1946
- Born: 25 February 1885; No. 1, Tilney Street, Park Lane, Central London
- Died: 11 November 1971 (aged 86); Barbados
- Spouse: Charles Vyner Brooke
- Issue: Leonora Margaret Brooke; Elizabeth Brooke; Nancy Valerie Brooke
Names
- Sylvia Leonora Brett
- House: White Rajahs (by marriage); Brett Family
- Father: Reginald Brett, 2nd Viscount Esher
- Mother: Eleanor van de Weyer

Sylvia Leonora, Lady Brooke, Ranee of Sarawak (born The Hon. Sylvia Leonora Brett, 25 February 1885 – 11 November 1971), was an English aristocrat who became the consort to Sir Charles Vyner de Windt Brooke, the third and last of the White Rajahs of Sarawak.

== Early life ==
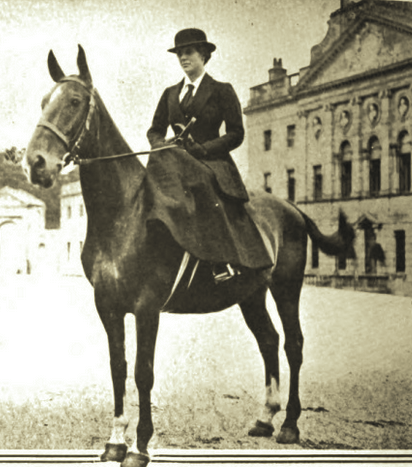
Sylvie Brooke (1916)

Brett was born at No. 1 Tilney Street, Park Lane, Central London, the second daughter of Reginald Baliol Brett, the 2nd Viscount Esher, KCB. Her mother Eleanor was the third daughter of the Belgian politician and revolutionary Sylvain Van de Weyer and his wife Elizabeth, who was the only child of the great financier Joshua Bates of Barings Bank. Sylvia grew up at the family home, Orchard Lea, at Cranbourne in Winkfield parish in Berkshire. Her paternal grandmother Eugénie Meyer was French, born in Lyons.

Sylvia Brett grew up in a troubled household. She was ignored by her courtier father, who was far more interested in flirting with young men than being a parent. Sylvia and her sister Dot had to suffer starvation of affection, and she decided to "electrify the world" when she grew up.

== Ranee of Sarawak ==
Brett married Rajah Vyner of Sarawak at St Peter's Church, Cranbourne, Berkshire, just before her 26th birthday on 21 February 1911. They first met in 1909 when she joined an all-female choral orchestra, established by Vyner's mother. She first visited Sarawak in 1912, where her husband (from 1917) ruled a 40,000-square-mile (100,000 km^{2}) jungle kingdom on the northern side of Borneo with a population of 500,000, an ethnic mix of Chinese, Malays, and the headhunting Dayak. Brett was invested with the titles of Ranee of Sarawak on 24 May 1917 and Grand Master of The Most Illustrious Order of the Star of Sarawak on 1 August 1941. Vyner died in 1963.

Brett was distraught that her eldest daughter, Leonora, under Islamic law, could not take the throne; as a result she hatched various plots to blacken the name of the heir apparent, Anthony, the Rajah Muda.

She was known for having Machiavellian machinations, which agitated the British Colonial Office. Brett always had designs on her husband's succession because her daughters, as women, were not eligible to become rulers of Sarawak. "Her own brother described her as a “female Iago” because she was the family nuisance and great schemer."

Richard Halliburton, the celebrated adventurer, met her as he circumnavigated the globe in 1932 with his pilot, Moye Stephens. She became the first woman in Sarawak to fly when the pair gave her a flight in their biplane, the Flying Carpet. Halliburton narrates an account of the visit in his book of the same name.

Sylvia Brett enjoyed dressing up in sarongs and exotic jewelry and decorated her London home with spears, totem poles.

Brett was the author of eleven books, including Sylvia of Sarawak and Queen of the Head-Hunters (1970). She also contributed short stories to publications such as John O'London's Weekly, for example "The Debt Collector", in the Summer Reading Number June 29, 1929.

Fort Sylvia in Kapit, Malaysia, is named in her honour.

== Children ==
Brett was survived by three daughters:

- Dayang Leonora Margaret, Countess of Inchcape, wife of Kenneth Mackay, 2nd Earl of Inchcape (by whom she had a son, Lord Tanlaw, and a daughter), and later wife of Colonel Francis Parker Tompkins (by whom she had a son).
- Dayang Elizabeth, a RADA educated singer and actress, wife of firstly Harry Roy (with whom she had a son, David Roy and daughter, Roberta Simpson), secondly, Richard Vidmer until her death.
- Dayang Nancy Valerie, an actress, known for The Charge of the Light Brigade (1936 film), wife of firstly, Robert Gregory, an American wrestler; secondly, José Pepi Cabarro – a Spanish businessman; thirdly, Andrew Aitken Macnair (one son, Stewart, born 1952); and fourthly, Memery Whyatt. She died in Florida.

== Sister ==
Brett's elder sister Dorothy Brett (1883–1977), known as Brett, went to the Slade School of Art in 1910 and became friends with painters Dora Carrington (1893-1932) and Mark Gertler (1891–1939), and then with salon hostess Lady Ottoline Morrell (1873–1938) and the Bloomsbury group, living for a while at Garsington Manor. In 1924 she went to live on a mountain ranch near Taos, New Mexico, with D.H. Lawrence and his wife Frieda, partially fulfilling Lawrence's dream of establishing an artists' colony.

== Ancestors ==
Ancestors of Sylvia Brett

8. Rev. Joseph Brett
4. William Brett, 1st Viscount Esher
9. Dora, daughter of George Best
2. Reginald Brett, 2nd Viscount Esher
10. Louis Mayer
5. Eugenie Mayer
11. Fanny
1. Sylvia Leonora
12. Josse-Alexandre van de Weyer
6. Sylvain Van de Weyer
13. Francoise-Martine Goubau
3. Eleanor van de Weyer
14. Joshua Bates
7. Elizabeth Bates
15. Lucretia Augusta Sturgis

== See also ==
- List of Sarawakian consorts
- White Rajahs
- Kingdom of Sarawak

Sylvia Brett Brooke family Born: 25 February 1885 Died: 11 November 1971
Regnal titles
Preceded by Margaret	Ranee of Sarawak; 1917–1946	Monarchy abolished
