= Viscount Esher =

Title in the Peerage of the United Kingdom

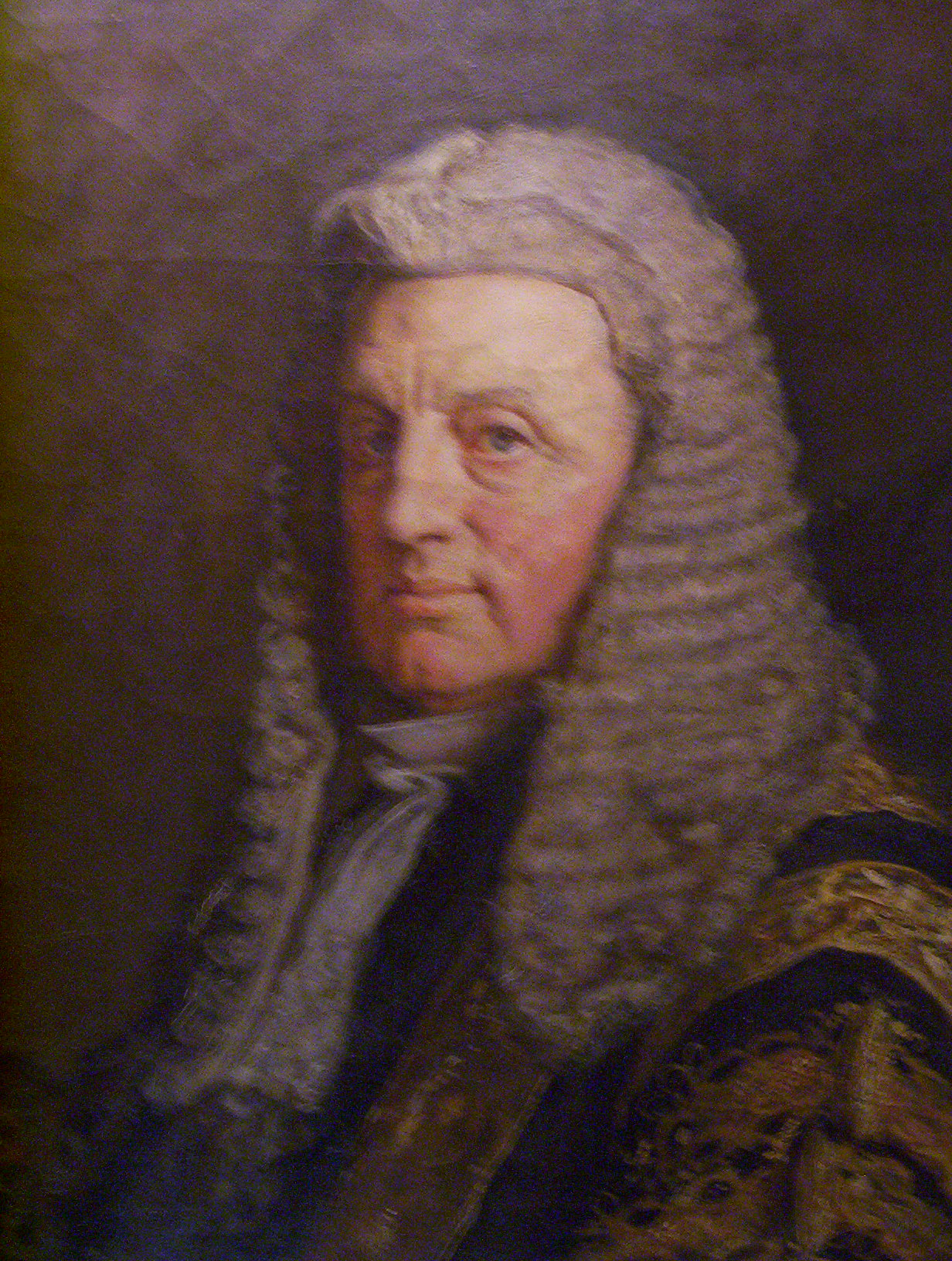
William Brett, 1st Viscount Esher

Viscount Esher, of Esher in the County of Surrey, is a title in the Peerage of the United Kingdom. It was created on 11 November 1897 for the prominent lawyer and judge William Brett, 1st Baron Esher, upon his retirement as Master of the Rolls. He had already been created Baron Esher, of Esher in the County of Surrey, on 24 July 1885, also in the Peerage of the United Kingdom. His son, the second Viscount, was a Liberal politician and historian. His grandson, the fourth Viscount, was a noted architect. As of 2010 the titles are held by the latter's son, the fifth Viscount, who succeeded in 2004.

The family seat is Beauforest House, near Newington, Oxfordshire.

== Viscounts Esher (1897) ==
- William Baliol Brett, 1st Viscount Esher (1815–1899)
- Reginald Baliol Brett, 2nd Viscount Esher (1852–1930)
- Oliver Sylvain Baliol Brett, 3rd Viscount Esher (1881–1963)
- Lionel Gordon Baliol Brett, 4th Viscount Esher (1913–2004)
- Christopher Lionel Baliol Brett, 5th Viscount Esher (b. 1936)

The heir apparent is the present holder's son Hon. Matthew Christopher Anthony Brett (b. 1963)
The heir apparent's heir apparent is his son Jack Alexander Baliol Brett (b. June 1996)

=== Line of succession ===
- William Baliol Brett, 1st Viscount Esher (1815—1899)
  - Reginald Baliol Brett, 2nd Viscount Esher (1852—1930)
    - Oliver Sylvain Baliol Brett, 3rd Viscount Esher (1881—1963)
      - Lionel Gordon Baliol Brett, 4th Viscount Esher (1913—2004)
        - Christopher Lionel Baliol Brett, 5th Viscount Esher (b. 1936)
          - (1) Hon. Matthew Christopher Anthony Brett (b. 1963)
            - (2) Jack Alexander Baliol Brett (b. 1996)
          - (3) Hon. Oliver Maxwell Brett (b. 1972)
          - Hon. Orlando Benedict Carlos Brett (b. 1974)
          - (4) Hon. William Falkland Brett (b. 1982)
        - (5) Hon. Michael Jeremy Baliol Brett (b. 1939)
        - (6) Hon. Guy Anthony Baliol Brett (b. 1942)
        - (7) Hon. Maurice Sebastion Baliol Brett (b. 1944)
          - (8) Judd Brett (b. 1972)
        - (9) Hon. Stephen Patrick Baliol Brett (b. 1952)

== Arms ==
Coat of arms of Viscount Esher
Crest A lion passant Gules charged on the shoulder with a cross botonny fitchéee Or and holding in the dexter forepaw a fasces Proper. Escutcheon Quarterly 1st & 4th Gules within an orle of crosses botonny fitchée Or a lion rampant of the last holding in the dexter forepaw a fasces erect Proper 2nd per pale Or and Gules three leopard's faces counterchanged 3rd Azure three bears' heads couped Argent muzzled Gules. Supporters Dexter a boar sinister a lion both Sable and each charged on the shoulder with a cross botonny fitchée Or and holding between the paws a fasces erect Proper. Motto Vicimus
