= Ashpitel =

Ashpitel is an English surname. Notable people with the surname include:

- Arthur Ashpitel (1807–1869), English architect
- William Hurst Ashpitel (1776–1852), English architect
