= Blunsdon =

Civil parish in Wiltshire, England

Coordinates: 51.61°N 1.79°W

- Blunsdon High Street in 2022

- Location within Wiltshire
- Population: 2,714 (parish, 2021)
- OS grid reference: SU154902
- Civil parish: Blunsdon
- Unitary authority: Swindon
- Ceremonial county: Wiltshire
- Region: South West
- Country: England
- Sovereign state: United Kingdom
- Post town: Swindon
- Postcode district: SN25, SN26
- Dialling code: 01793
- Police: Wiltshire
- Fire: Dorset and Wiltshire
- Ambulance: South Western
- UK Parliament: Swindon North
- Website: Parish Council

Blunsdon is a civil parish in the Borough of Swindon, Wiltshire, England, about 4 miles (6 km) north of the centre of Swindon. Its settlements are the village of Broad Blunsdon and the hamlets of Lower Blunsdon and Broadbush.

Although now contiguous with the Swindon urban area following the northwards expansion of the town in the 1990s and 2000s, the A419 Blunsdon bypass forms a slight separation from the rest of the suburban area. Blunsdon is the eastern half of the former Blunsdon St Andrew civil parish; in April 2017, the parish was divided and the western half became the new St Andrews parish.

== History ==
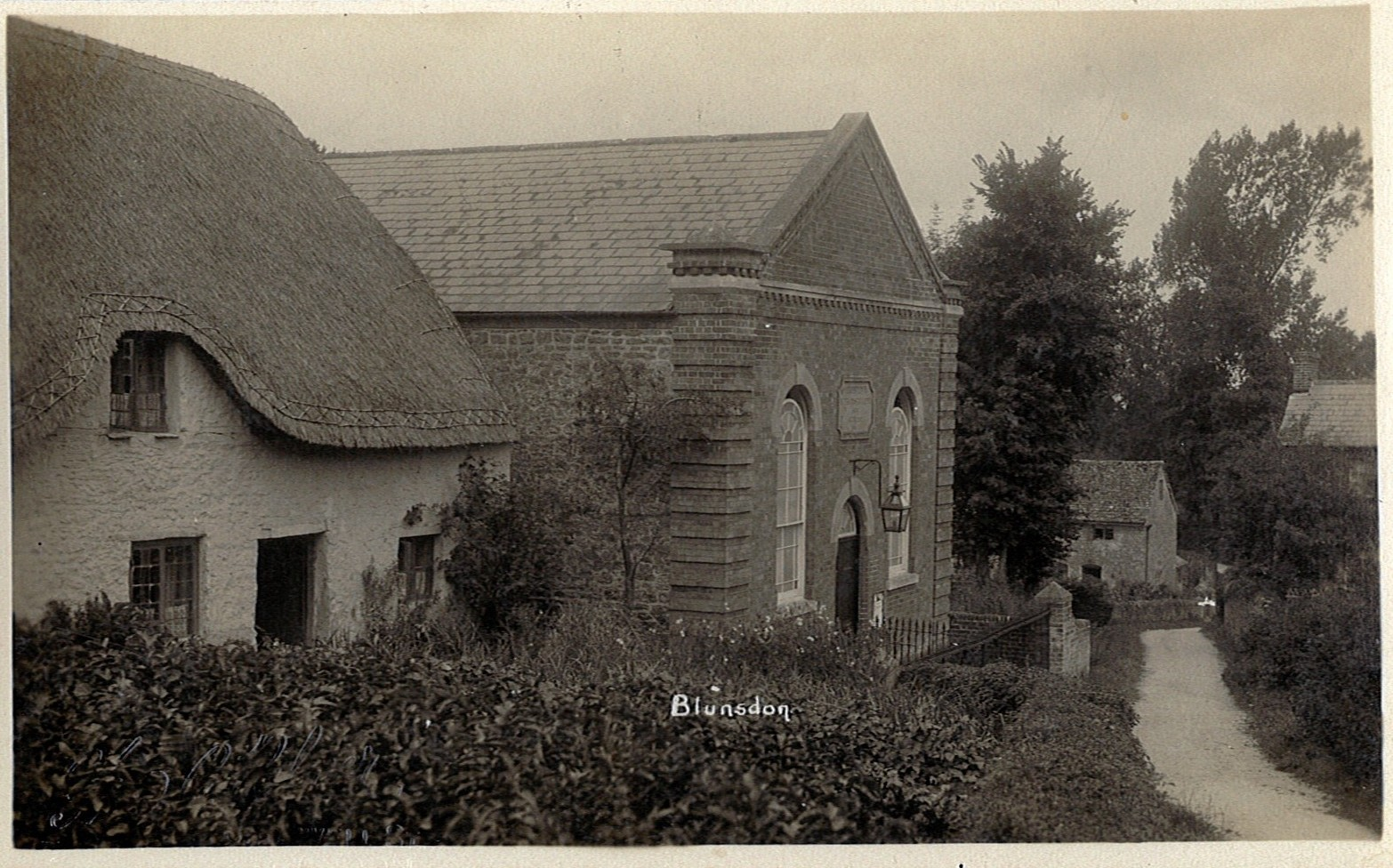
Chapel Hill, Blunsdon, c. 1920

Blunsdon has been inhabited at least since the Iron Age. Castle Hill is the site of a hillfort and is a scheduled monument. In Roman times, a travellers' resting place existed on the site of the present-day Cold Harbour public house. The main A419 road follow the course of a Roman road known as Ermin Way that linked the historic Roman towns of Gloucester (Glevum) and Silchester (Calleva Atrebatum), via Cirencester (Corinium).

The Domesday Book of 1086 records a manor of Bluntesdone, comprising three settlements across Blunsdon Hill on either side of Ermin Street, with altogether ten households and a total value of £5 17s. Broad Blunsdon is first mentioned as Bradebluntesdone in 1234, in the "Calendar of the Feet of Fines for Wiltshire for 1195–1272".

The L-shaped manor house, just west of the church, was built and enlarged in the 17th century; it has two fireplaces from c.1600, and a staircase also from that century.

In 1870, Broad Blunsdon was recorded as having a population of 806 in 198 households, and covering 2,260 acres, and was valued at £2,194. It lay in the chapelry of Highworth. The village included the tithing of Bury Blunsdon, population 17, now marked only by the farms of upper and lower Burytown.

Two areas of Broad Blunsdon village, one encompassing the church, were designated as a conservation area in 1990.

== Parish church ==
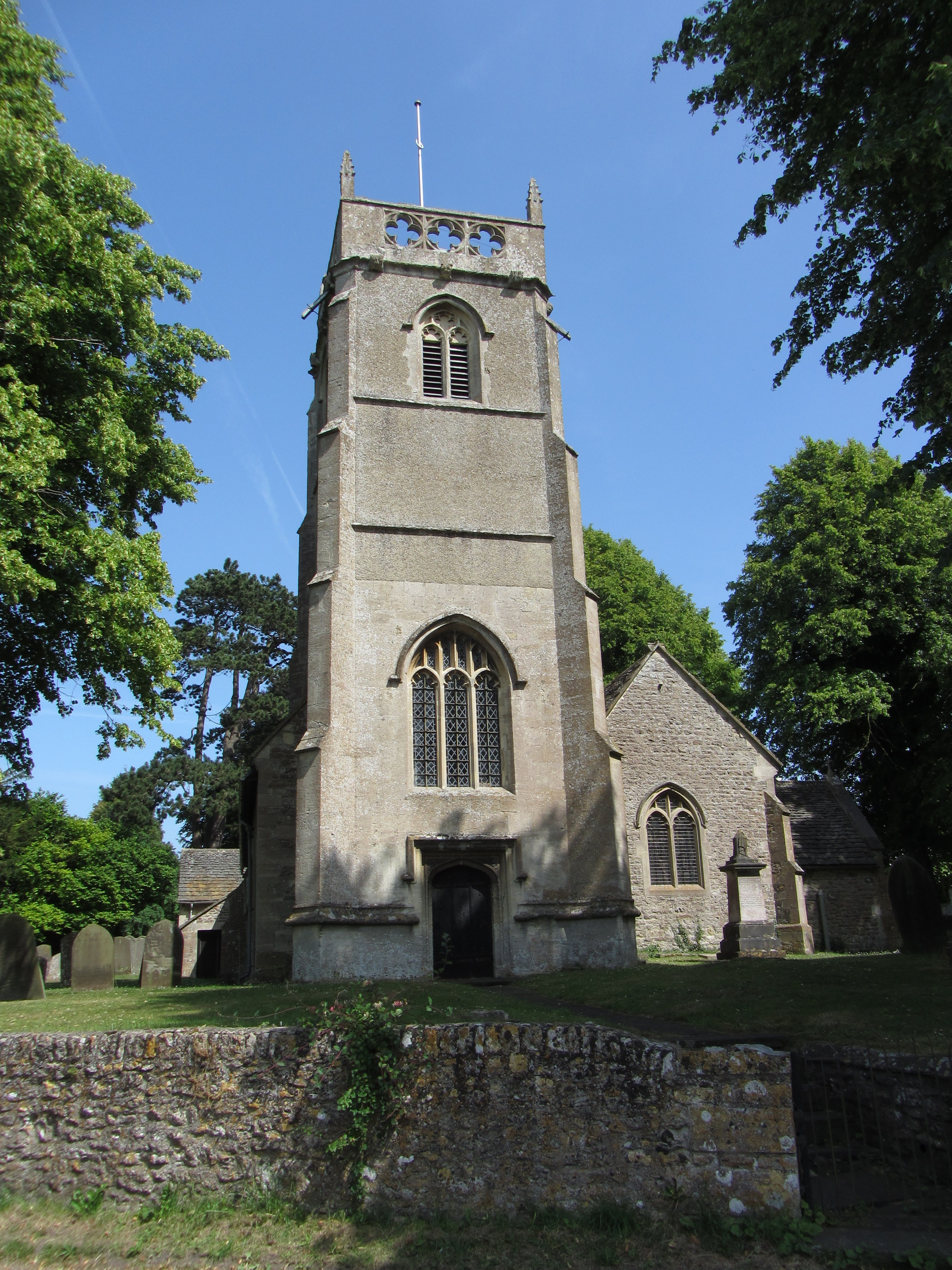
St Leonard's church

St Leonard's, the Church of England parish church, is in the north-east of the village. The stone rubble building has 13th-century origins, seen in the four-bay south arcade and a small two-light window in the south aisle. The west tower is from the 15th century; the elaborate wooden screen under the tower is 17th-century. A monument to John Potenger (died 1733), in white and grey marble with cherub heads, is signed by Peter Scheemakers.

William Butterfield carried out extensive restoration in 1870, when the chancel was rebuilt and the south-east chapel and north-east vestry were added. The building was designated as Grade II* listed in 1955.

There is a ring of eight bells, cast in 1913 and 2002. The stone-built former rectory, east of the church, was built in 1867–1868 to designs of Ewan Christian. Today the parish is within the benefice of Highworth with Sevenhampton and Inglesham and Hannington, centred on St Michael's church at Highworth.

== Castle Hill ==
Castle Hill, to the east of the church, is an Iron Age hillfort and a scheduled monument. The site comprises earthworks typical for the period, with a single ditch and rampart surrounding the enclosure. It is triangular in plan and covers 3.5 hectares (9 acres) in extent. The site is on a slight promontory with views over the valley to the north and north west. The site includes a series of parallel agricultural terraces, known as lynchets, which are thought to date from the medieval period.

== Sport ==
The village has a football team, Blunsdon F.C., which has youth development squads as well as senior ladies and men's sides playing in the Wiltshire League.

== Governance ==
Blunsdon parish covers Broad Blunsdon and the area west of the A419. In the southeast, the boundary with St Andrews leaves the A419 and follows the A4311 Cricklade Road, so that the Groundwell industrial estate is in Blunsdon parish. The estate is the location of the Motorola headquarters building, which featured in the 1999 James Bond film The World Is Not Enough.

Until April 2017, the whole area was the civil parish of Blunsdon St Andrew. The parish lies within the Borough of Swindon, and forms its namesake ward which elects one member of Swindon Borough Council. For Westminster elections, the parish is part of the Swindon North constituency.

== Shop ==
After the last privately owned shop in the village closed in 2002, villagers held a public meeting and agreed to open a community shop, which was opened in 2003 in the car park of the village hall. Run mainly by volunteers, in 2010 the shop won third place for 'Best Village Shop' at the Wiltshire Life Magazine Awards. In 2023, the shop moved to new premises at Unit 1, Blunt Rise, Blunsdon, SN26 7DA and expanded to include a cafe.

== Roads and transport ==
The former A419 on Blunsdon Hill in 2007

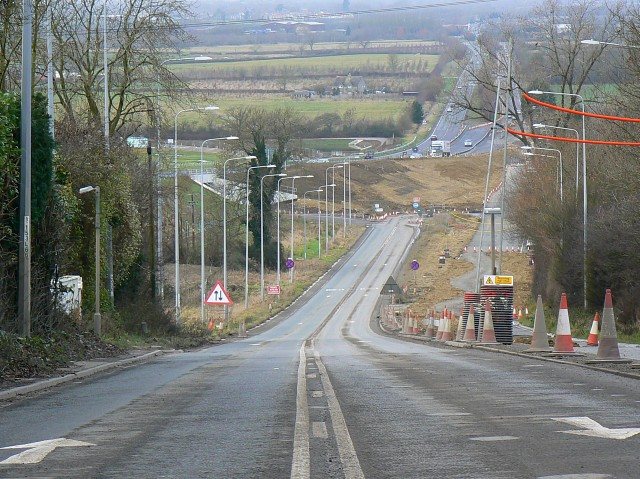
View down Blunsdon Hill shortly after being bypassed in 2008, showing the old route of the A419, and of Ermin Way – the Roman road to Cirencester and beyond.

Formerly, the A419 ran directly through Broad Blunsdon along Ermin Street and Blunsdon Hill. The village was often severely congested, with over 50,000 vehicles per day causing frequent bottlenecks. A bypass was built around Blunsdon between September 2006 and May 2009, taking most through traffic out of the village.

The northbound carriageway opened in June 2008, and the southbound carriageway followed in November 2008. The major scheme cost £65.5 million to build; after the bypass opened, the former A419 route through Blunsdon itself was reduced to a single carriageway and the two halves of the village – previously divided by the major road – were effectively reunited.
