= Reginald Brett, 2nd Viscount Esher =

British politician and historian (1852–1930)

The Right Honourable The Viscount Esher GCVO KCB PC DL

Member of Parliament for Penryn and Falmouth
- In office 1880–1885 Serving with David James Jenkins
- Preceded by: Henry Thomas Cole; David James Jenkins
- Succeeded by: David James Jenkins

Constable and Governor of Windsor Castle
- In office 1928–1930
- Preceded by: The 1st Marquess of Cambridge
- Succeeded by: The 1st Earl of Athlone

Personal details
- Born: Reginald Baliol Brett; 30 June 1852 London, England
- Died: 22 January 1930 (aged 77)
- Party: Liberal
- Spouse: Eleanor Van de Weyer
- Children: 4, including: Dorothy Brett; Sylvia Brett
- Parents: William Baliol Brett, 1st Viscount Esher; Eugénie Mayer
- Education: Eton College; Trinity College, Cambridge
- Occupation: Politician, courtier, historian

Reginald Baliol Brett, 2nd Viscount Esher, GCVO, KCB, PC, DL (30 June 1852 – 22 January 1930) was a British historian and Liberal Party politician, although his greatest influence over military and foreign affairs was as a courtier, member of public committees and behind-the-scenes "fixer", or rather éminence grise. Behind the scenes, he influenced many pre-First World War military reforms and was a supporter of the British–French Entente Cordiale.

== Early life and education ==
Reginald Baliol Brett, known to his family as Regy, was born on 30 June 1852 in London. His father, William Baliol Brett, 1st Viscount Esher, was a distinguished barrister who later gained prominence as a member of parliament for his dutiful support of Benjamin Disraeli during the 1867 Reform Act debate. He was Solicitor General in Disraeli's first ministry in 1868, and later a judge on the Court of Common Pleas, Lord Justice of Appeal and Master of the Rolls. In 1885, he was raised to the peerage as Baron Esher by Prime Minister Lord Salisbury. On his retirement as Master of the Rolls in 1897, he was created first Viscount Esher. Reginald's mother, Eugénie Mayer (1814–1904), was the French stepdaughter of Colonel John Gurwood, the editor of Wellington's dispatches who killed himself in 1845.

The young Brett's childhood was spent between London and Heath Farm, the family's modest country house near Watford, with occasional visits to his mother's family in Paris and to Lowther Castle in Westmorland, the home of his father's friend, William Lowther, 2nd Earl of Lonsdale.

He first attended Cheam School, where he was tutored by Arthur Campbell Ainger to prepare him for Eton College. He entered Eton in January 1865, where he was taught by influential master William Johnson. The exact nature of Brett's relationship with Johnson, a proponent of the ancient Greek practice of ephebophilia who was forced to resign from Eton in 1872 over an indiscreet letter to a young pupil, has long been a source of speculation. At the very least, Johnson was an eager observer and catalyst of homosexual relationships among his pupils, including Brett, who began romances with Charles D. R. Williamson and Francis Elliot. Johnson recounted these observations in his letters to Brett and others.

He began studies at Trinity College, Cambridge in 1870. At Cambridge, Brett was profoundly influenced by the radical lawyer, politician and professor of international law William Harcourt and Harcourt's advisor Lady Ripon, a wealthy Christian Socialist and radical. Through the Ripons and Harcourt, Brett came to reject his father's Toryism and adopt the Whig principles that would lead him to join the Liberal Party.

When Benjamin Disraeli unsuccessfully tried to enforce Anglicanism in the Public Worship Bill, Brett wrote copious letters to the Marquess of Hartington, leader of the Liberal Party in the House of Commons, and Harcourt was pushed into the limelight as a leading Liberal in the Commons.

== Early political career ==
Brett as MP in 1880

Having been a Conservative as a young man, Brett began his political career in 1880 as Liberal member of parliament for Penryn and Falmouth and associate of Lord Hartington. However, the resolution of the Great Eastern Crisis and success of the 1878–80 Midlothian Campaign had re-energized William Ewart Gladstone's authority as rightful leader of the Liberals, marginalising Hartington and Brett as jingoes. Brett remained loyal to Hartington, serving as his parliamentary private secretary during Hartington's term as Secretary of State for War (1882–85) and once drove him to a Cabinet meeting on a sleigh through the snow. When Hartington broke with the Liberals to form the Liberal Unionist Party, Brett became the mediator between the factions and was a leading figure at the Liberal Round Table Conference of 1887. After losing an election at Plymouth in 1885, Brett elected to withdraw from public politics in favour of a behind-the-scenes role.

He was instrumental in the Jameson raid of 1895, vigorously defending Cecil Rhodes. During the Boer War, Esher intervened in the row between Lord Lansdowne and General Garnet Wolseley, the Commander-in-Chief of the Forces, who tended to blame Lansdowne for military failures. Esher's memoranda on the conflict became established civil service procedure.

== Courtier and military reforms ==
In 1895, Brett became Permanent Secretary to the Office of Works, where Edward, Prince of Wales, was impressed by his zeal and dedication to the elderly Queen Victoria. In Kensington Palace, Esher would push the Queen in a wheel chair so she could revisit her childhood. Upon his father's death on 24 May 1899, he succeeded him as 2nd Viscount Esher. In 1901, Lord Esher was appointed a deputy lieutenant of Berkshire and became Deputy Governor and Constable of Windsor Castle; he lived at Orchard Lea, Winkfield, on the edge of the Great Park. After Edward's coronation in 1902, he gained greater royal influence and shunned political office; by the end of 1903, he met or corresponded with Edward VII daily and meeting with the King's adviser Lord Knollys three to four times daily. During this period, he helped edit Queen Victoria's papers, publishing Correspondence of Queen Victoria in 1907.

=== Esher Report and military influence ===
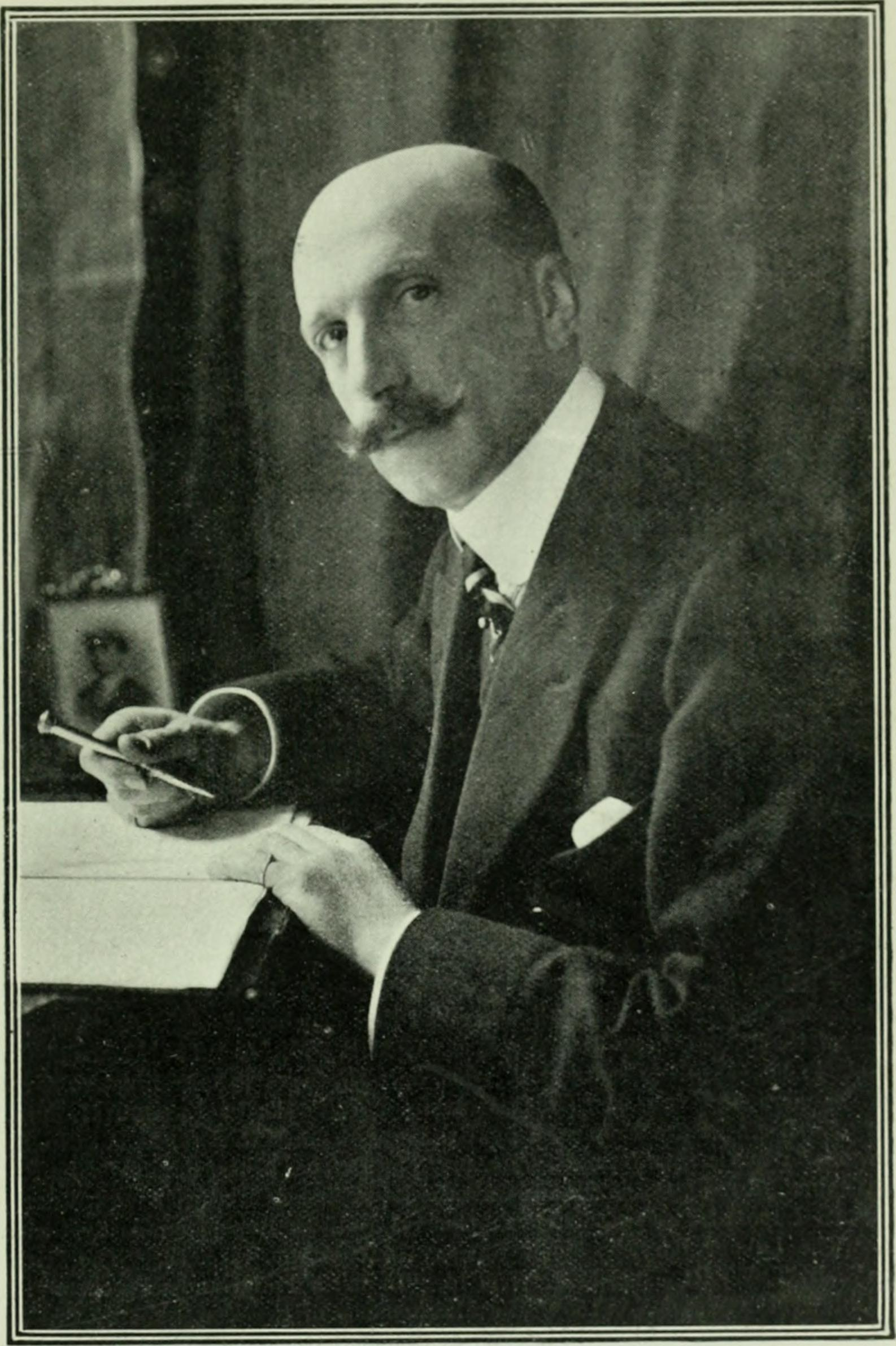
Brett at his writing table in 1905

From 1903, Esher was a member of Lord Elgin's South African War Commission, which investigated the British Army's near-failure in the Boer War. In that role, he informed the King of the views of the commission, party leaders, and War Office civil servants with whom he was still in touch from his days working for Hartington, who had in 1891 become 8th Duke of Devonshire. Secretary of State for War St John Brodrick was resentful of Esher's influence, which paralysed Brodrick's scope for operation, and the government was much weakened in October 1903, when Joseph Chamberlain and Devonshire resigned over the former's plans for Tariff Reform.

In 1903, Esher was appointed to chair the Report of the War Office (Reconstitution) Committee, a sub-committee of the Elgin Commission which became known as the Esher Committee. The sub-committee consisted of Esher, Admiral Sir John Fisher, and Colonel Sir George Clarke. To advance the King's desired reforms of the Army, Esher formed an uneasy alliance with Clarke to directly undermine Secretary of State for War H. O. Arnold-Forster, an opponent of reform. On 7 December, Arnold-Foster advised the militia must be absorbed into the Army to save £2,000,000. Encouraged by the King, Esher wanted prime minister Arthur Balfour to look to party first, while at the same time warning the King's Secretary that, "the Prime Minister will have to take matters into his own hands". Esher's role, playing both Crown and Parliament against each other by confidential memoranda was kept secret for sixty-seven years. It was decided on 19 December a Reserve Force should be set up "in commission". On 12 January, Esher told the minister to accept his sub-committee's recommendation, even though Arnold-Foster had not even been told of the agenda. Despite the intrigues, the King approved of the committee's work. The sub-committee produced the Esher Report in February and March 1904, recommending radical reform of the British Army, including the establishment of the Army Council and the Committee of Imperial Defence, a permanent secretariat. The King successfully urged adoption of its recommended reforms by Prime Minister Arthur Balfour.

Esher cultivated a friendship with Colonel Sir Edmund Ward, secretary to the Army Council, in order to control minute-taking, the Council agenda, and quorum at meetings. In 1904, Esher told Ward he had "proof of the Army Order" and a plan toward Army decentralisation, called "Traverse". Believing the royal prerogative had been circumvented "without reference to the Sovereign", Esher marched into Arnold-Foster's office to remind him that precedent under Victoria had been to yield to arguments from the monarch, which had already been put forward by the Adjutant-General.

After 1904, all War Office appointments were approved and often suggested by Esher. He approved the establishment of the Territorial Force, although he saw it as a step toward conscription, a step not taken. Many of Esher's recommendations were implemented between 1905 and 1918 under Secretary of State for War Richard Haldane, assisted by Esher's protégé, the young Major-General Douglas Haig. Haldane's initial Liberal reforms were thrown out by the House of Lords, and the resulting documents more closely resembled Esher's original efforts. Esher's biographer Peter Fraser thus argued "the Haldane reforms owed little to Haldane." Although Edward VII urged Esher's appointment as Secretary of State for War, he declined it, along with many other public offices, including the Viceroyalty of India.

In 1909, Esher was appointed a deputy lieutenant of the County of London and the King's Aide-de-Camp. He gained a reputation as a disciple of national efficiency, an able administrator, and a silky, smooth influence as a courtier. He was accused of being an arch-insider, undemocratic and interfering. However, the King favoured Esher, and his influence over the Army grew, with a focus on to averting conflict in Europe. Despite his close political connections, including Lord Tweedmouth and Lord Rosebery, his undemocratic reputation and ties to the monarch prevented further political ambition or any high cabinet office. He founded the Society of Islanders, established on the principle of "two for one Keels", an expression of British naval supremacy in order to maintain global peace.

Esher's involvements in the Territorials were not limited to the War Office. He was the first chairman appointed in 1908 to the County of London Territorial Forces Association and its president from 1912 to his death, in addition he was appointed Honorary Colonel of the 5th (Reserve) Battalion of the Royal Fusiliers in 1908 and held the same appointment with the 6th County of London Brigade, Royal Field Artillery, from 1910 to 1921.

In 1911, Esher helped ease out Lord Knollys, who was then seventy-five years old and a member of the Royal Household since 1862, but who had lost royal confidence over his negotiation of the Parliament Act 1911. Esher arranged Lord Stamfordham as his replacement.

Together with Lewis Harcourt, he established the London Museum, which opened its doors on 5 March 1912.

=== Great War ===
After the outbreak of the First World War, Esher served as an emissary to France and often travelled to France as a respite from the "mephitic" atmosphere of the War Office. In one writer's description, Esher served as de facto head of British Intelligence in France, reporting on the French domestic and political situation, although he told his son he preferred not to have a formal position where he would have to take orders. His son Maurice set up a bureau in Paris called Intelligence Anglaise, keeping his father informed through a small spy network with links to newspaper journalists.

He visited Prime Minister of France Aristide Briand in Paris in January 1915, and Briand told him that the Chancellor of the Exchequer, David Lloyd George, had "a longer view than any of our leaders" and that an earlier opening of the Salonica front might have prevented the entry of Bulgaria into the war. Following the Russian defeats on the Eastern Front, H. H. Asquith's neutrality over Briand's Salonica Plan perplexed Esher, and he perceived the balance of power in cabinet shifting toward a more conservative coalition. He also made contact in Paris with Maurice Bunau-Varilla, owner and editor of Le Matin, with the intent of influencing the Russian Empire to remain in the Allied Forces and the United States to join.

By 1916, however, the French war effort was almost spent, and Esher reported that Finance Minister Alexandre Ribot sought to sue for peace. At the Chantilly Conference, they discussed combined operations to maintain the momentum. Esher accompanied Haig to the Amiens Conference, but on his return to Paris, was informed of the sinking of HMS Hampshire and death of Earl Kitchener. Returning to London, Esher spoke with Prime Minister of Australia Billy Hughes. The following month at the Beaugency Conference, they discussed the Somme Offensive. Esher told Maurice Hankey, "For heaven's sake put every ounce you have got of will power into this offensive." He also learnt firsthand the French government's scheme for a "Greater Syria" to include British controlled Palestine.

In 1917, he told Lloyd George, now Prime Minister, that diplomacy in Paris was weak and that Lloyd George "was badly served". Ambassador Lord Bertie was the last of the Victorian imperial envoys and Esher argued he had failed to do enough to persuade France to remain in the war. When offered the ambassadorship himself, Esher crowed, "I cannot imagine anything I would detest more." Following a French mutiny the next month, Haig and Henry Wilson lent support to an offensive to bolster the French. Philippe Pétain, the new French commander-in-chief, was deemed too defensive, and Esher sent Charles à Court Repington on a "charm offensive". With support from Minister of Munitions Winston Churchill and Lord Milner for dramatic action, Esher entered diplomatic conversation with the War Policy Committee, a unique departure in the management of British policy. However, bad weather and sickness of war made Esher ill in 1917, and he was encouraged by King George V to holiday at Biarritz.

Partly on Esher's advice, the War Office undertook major re-organization in 1917, unifying all British military commands at the Imperial War Office. Esher was at the famous Crillon Club dinner meeting in Paris on 1 December 1917, at which with Georges Clemenceau, they took critical decisions over the strategy for 1918. The Allied Governments proposed a unified Allied Reserve, despite negative press and publicity in the Commons. As cabinet enforcer, Esher visited Henry Wilson on 9 February 1918, during the crisis over his succession to William Robertson as Chief of the Imperial General Staff. Esher became instrumental in remonstrating against the war effort with loose press articles in Lord Northcliffe's newspapers and The Morning Post. In France, Esher established a rapprochement with the press to help hold the Clemenceau government together, at a time when England was at the zenith of her military strength.

As the war concluded, Esher learned that the King wanted his resignation as Deputy-Governor of Windsor. In fact, he coveted the post of Keeper of the Royal Archives. Lord Stamfordham demanded his resignation in favour of historian Sir John Fortescue, but Esher remained as Governor. Professionalization also warned Maurice Hankey against becoming secretary to the Paris Peace Conference, which to Esher's mind was beyond his competence. Esher also persuaded his friend not to desert the British Empire for the League of Nations. Domestic unrest and trade unionism, which Esher loathed, as it threatened peace and stability, also destabilized his position as President of the Army of India Committee. Ever skeptical of political changes, "omnivorous" introductions to the Viceroy's work forced him to decline a solicitous offer to chair a sub-committee of the Conditions of the Poor.

=== Post-war work ===
Esher was sworn of the Privy Council in 1922. In 1928 he became Constable and Governor of Windsor Castle, an office he had always wanted, holding it until his death in 1930.

Lord Esher was also a historian; besides the aforementioned work, he also published works on King Edward VII and Lord Kitchener. In February 1920, he proofread Haig's History of the General Head Quarters 1917–1918. That summer, Esher's critique of a Life of Disraeli appeared in Quarterly Review. His memoir, Cloud-capp'd Towers, was published in 1927. After his death, his sons published four volumes of his Journals and Letters (1934–1938).

== Honours and arms ==
=== British honours ===
- KCB : Knight Commander the Order of the Bath – announced in the 1902 Coronation Honours list on 26 June 1902 – invested by King Edward while on board his yacht HMY Victoria and Albert on 28 July 1902 (gazetted 11 July 1902)
- GCVO: Knight Grand Cross of the Royal Victorian Order (previously KCVO)

=== Arms ===
Coat of arms of Reginald Brett, 2nd Viscount Esher
Crest A lion passant Gules charged on the shoulder with a cross botonny fitchéee Or and holding in the dexter forepaw a fasces Proper. Escutcheon Quarterly 1st & 4th Gules within an orle of crosses botonny fitchée Or a lion rampant of the last holding in the dexter forepaw a fasces erect Proper 2nd per pale Or and Gules three leopard's faces counterchanged 3rd Azure three bears' heads couped Argent muzzled Gules. Supporters Dexter a boar sinister a lion both Sable and each charged on the shoulder with a cross botonny fitchée Or and holding between the paws a fasces erect Proper. Motto Vicimus

== Personal life ==
=== Family ===
In 1879, Reginald Brett married Eleanor Van de Weyer, daughter of Belgian ambassador Sylvain Van de Weyer and granddaughter of Anglo-American financier Joshua Bates. They had four children.

- Their elder son, Oliver Sylvain Baliol Brett became 3rd Viscount Esher and was a Fellow of the Royal Institute of British Architects. He married Antoinette Heckscher, daughter of August Heckscher.
- Their second son, Maurice Vyner Baliol Brett, married the famous musical theatre actress Zena Dare.
- Their older daughter, Dorothy, was a painter and member of the Bloomsbury Group. She studied at the Slade School of Fine Arts and spent years in New Mexico.
- Their younger daughter, Sylvia, became the last Ranee of Sarawak on 24 May 1917, following the proclamation of her husband Charles Vyner Brooke as Rajah.

Esher found his son, Oliver, a job as an additional secretary to John Morley and he was on good terms with Captain Sinclair, Campbell-Bannerman's secretary.

=== Sexuality ===
Although married with children, Lord Esher had homosexual inclinations. His flirtations with young men were regarded with tolerant amusement in polite society, and the years before his marriage were marked by a series of what Esher described as "rapturous" love affairs with various young men, beginning with his time at Eton. His marriage in no way stopped or curtailed these activities, and he told a friend he could not remember a single day when he was not in love with one young man or another. He later anonymously published a book of verse called Foam, in which he glorified "golden lads". According to his biographer James Lees-Milne, Esher "never deliberately concealed his infatuations" but explicitly confided them to only a few, including Esher's son Maurice, to whom Esher wrote prurient and even romantic letters during the boy's time at Eton.

By the end of the First World War the King and his Private Secretary Lord Stamfordham, both described by historian Jane Ridley as "manly men", had grown to dislike Esher intensely. Owen Morshead later (in 1964) told Philip Magnus that they thought Esher a “medicated tom cat" and that "they felt their skin prickle when he entered the palace, as some people react to the unseen presence of a cat in the room".

One of Esher's most significant male companions was his private secretary Lawrence Burgis, who met Esher when he was attending King's School, Worcester. Although Burgis was heterosexual and the relationship likely was not physically consummated, they remained closely acquainted until Esher's death in 1930. After British entry into World War I, Esher personally intervened to have Burgis appointed as an aide-de-camp to the British Expeditionary Force Commander of Intelligence John Charteris so that he could avoid front-line service on the Western Front. Esher also had Burgis appointed as a secretary to the Cabinet Office, and Burgis later used this position to keep verbatim records of Prime Minister Winston Churchill's War Cabinet meetings in defiance of the Official Secrets Act 1911, providing one of the most important records of World War II.

== Screen portrayal ==
Esher was played by Basil Hoskins in episodes 11 to 13 of the ATV drama series, Edward the Seventh (1975).

Parliament of the United Kingdom
Preceded by Henry Thomas Cole; David James Jenkins	Member of Parliament for Penryn and Falmouth; 1880–1885; With: David James Jenkins	Succeeded by David James Jenkins
Honorary titles
Preceded by The Marquess of Cambridge	Constable and Governor of Windsor Castle; 1928–1930	Succeeded by The Earl of Athlone
Peerage of the United Kingdom
Preceded by William Brett	Viscount Esher; 1899–1930	Succeeded by Oliver Brett
