= Janette Atkinson =

British psychologist

Janette Atkinson FBA FMedSci
- Education: University of Bristol; University of Cambridge
- Spouse: Oliver Braddick (m. 1979)
- Children: Four
- Scientific career
- Workplaces: University of Colorado Boulder; Johns Hopkins University; University of Cambridge; University College London; University of Oxford
- Thesis: A study of perceptual analysis using stabilized images (1970)

Janette Atkinson, FBA, FMedSci is a British psychologist and academic, specialising in the human development of vision and visual cognition. She was Professor of Psychology at University College London from 1993: she is now emeritus professor. She was also co-director of the Visual Development Unit at the Department of Psychology, University College London and the Department of Experimental Psychology, University of Oxford. She frequently collaborated with her husband Oliver Braddick.

== Early life and education ==
Atkinson studied psychology at the University of Bristol, graduating with a Bachelor of Science (BSc) degree in 1965. She went on to undertake postgraduate studies at the University of Cambridge, and she completed her Doctor of Philosophy (PhD) degree in 1970. Her doctoral thesis was titled "A study of perceptual analysis using stabilized images".

== Academic career ==
From 1971 to 1972, Atkinson was research associate with the Institute for Behavioral Genetics at the University of Colorado Boulder. In 1972, she was a research associate in the Department of Psychology of Johns Hopkins University, Maryland. She then returned to the University of Cambridge where she was a Senior Research Associate from 1972 to 1983. During this time, she established the Visual Development Unit at the University of Cambridge. From 1983 to 1993, she was classified as MRC External Scientific Staff of the Department of Experimental Psychology, Cambridge.

In 1993, Atkinson moved to University College London (UCL) where she had been appointed Professor of Psychology. The Visual Development Unit moved with her from Cambridge. A second Visual Development Unit was created at the University of Oxford in 2003. She was Co-Director of both units with her husband Oliver Braddick. Having retired from full-time academia, she was appointed Emeritus Professor by UCL.

== Personal life ==
In 1979, Atkinson married Oliver Braddick, a fellow developmental psychologist; he died in 2022. They have four children: two sons and two daughters.

== Honours ==
In 2002, Atkinson was elected a Fellow of the Academy of Medical Sciences (FMedSci). In 2008, she was elected a Member of Academia Europaea. In 2009, she, along with Oliver Braddick, won the Kurt Koffka Medal. In 2015, she was elected a Fellow of the British Academy (FBA), the United Kingdom's national academy for the humanities and social sciences. In 2016, she was awarded the Davida Teller Award by the Vision Sciences Society.

== Selected works ==
- Atkinson, Jannette; King, John; Braddick, Oliver; Nokes, Louise; Anker, Shirley; Braddick, Fleur (May 1997). "A specific deficit of dorsal stream function in Williams' syndrome". NeuroReport. 8 (8): 1919–1922. doi:10.1097/00001756-199705260-00025. PMID 9223077. S2CID 30762407.
- Atkinson, Janette (2000). The Developing Visual Brain. Oxford: Oxford University Press. ISBN 978-0198522973.
- Atkinson, Janette; Braddick, Oliver (2007). "Visual and visuocognitive development in children born very prematurely". From Action to Cognition. Progress in Brain Research. Vol. 164. pp. 123–49. doi:10.1016/S0079-6123(07)64007-2. ISBN 9780444530165. PMID 17920429.
- Atkinson, Janette; Braddick, Oliver (2011). "From genes to brain development to phenotypic behavior". Gene Expression to Neurobiology and Behavior: Human Brain Development and Developmental Disorders. Progress in Brain Research. Vol. 189. pp. 261–83. doi:10.1016/B978-0-444-53884-0.00029-4. ISBN 9780444538840. PMID 21489394.
- Atkinson, Janette; Braddick, Oliver (July 2012). "Visual attention in the first years: typical development and developmental disorders". Developmental Medicine & Child Neurology. 54 (7): 589–595. doi:10.1111/j.1469-8749.2012.04294.x. PMID 22568833. S2CID 20917298.
