= Gregor Schöner =

German computational neuroscientist

Gregor Schöner (born 1958 in Sindelfingen) is a German computational neuroscientist. He is a professor of the theory of cognitive systems at the Ruhr University Bochum and the director of the Institute for Neuroinformatics.

== Life and work ==
From 1983 to 1985, Gregor Schöner studied physics and mathematics at Saarland University. In 1985, he received his PhD in theoretical physics from the University of Stuttgart under Herrmann Haken. For the next four years, he devoted himself to applications of the theory of stochastic dynamical systems to the coordination of biological motion under J. A. Scott Kelso at Florida Atlantic University. From 1989 to 1994, he led a research group for the first time at the Institute of Neuroinformatics at Ruhr University in Bochum. In that time, he and his group extended the application of dynamical systems to models of perception, motion, and autonomous robotics. After a six-year stay at the Centre de Recherche en Neurosciences Cognitives in Marseille, Gregor Schöner returned to the institute in 2001. He took over its leadership in 2003, succeeding Christoph von der Malsburg, and has remained in this position until today. Since September 2022, he has been the chairman of the Society for Cognitive Science in Germany.

Gregor Schöner and his research group are known for the scientific development, applications, and software packages on Dynamic Field Theory (DFT). DFT provides a neurally plausible framework for the mathematical modeling of human cognition according to the theories of embodied cognition. The theory builds upon the continuous attractor networks models of Hugh R. Wilson and Jack D. Cowan (the "Wilson-Cowan model") and Shun'ichi Amari (the "neural field model"), which describe the interaction between excitatory and inhibitory coupled populations of cortical neurons. Schöner's research group publishes on visual search, spatial and relational language, and autonomous robotics.

== Publications ==
- Gregor Schöner, John P. Spencer and the DFT Research Group (2015). A primer on dynamic field theory. Oxford University Press, ISBN 978-0-19-930056-3
- Esther Thelen, Gregor Schöner, Christian Scheier, and Linda B. Smith (2001). "The dynamics of embodiment: A field theory of infant perseverative reaching". Behavioral and Brain Sciences 24(1), 1–34. doi:10.1017/s0140525x01003910
