= Kurt Koffka Medal =

Kurt-Koffka medal
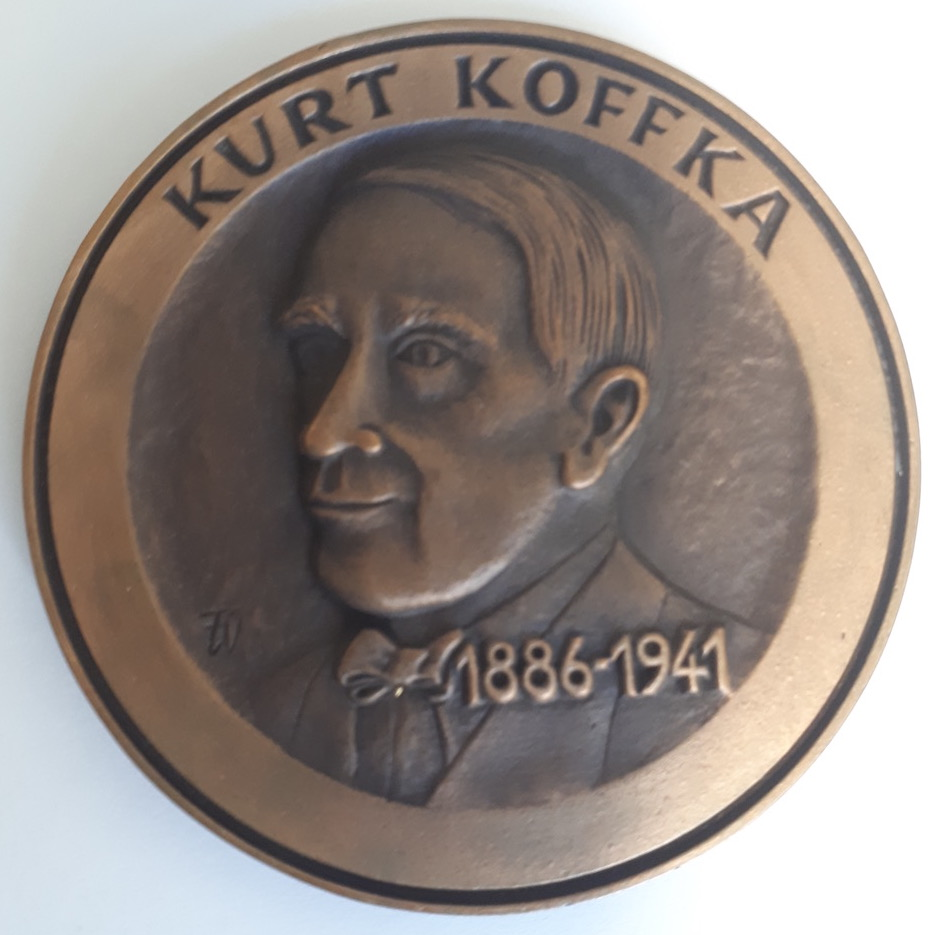
- Awarded for: Advancing the fields of perception or developmental psychology to an extraordinary extent.
- Country: Germany
- First award: 2007; 19 years ago
- Number of recipients: 15 awards to 18 recipients (as of 2022)
- Website: www.uni-giessen.de/fbz/fb06/psychologie/postertag-koffka/KKM/KKM/view

The Kurt-Koffka Medal, Kurt Koffka Medal, Kurt Koffka Award, or Koffka Prize is an annual, international award bestowed by Giessen University's Department of Psychology for "advancing the fields of perception or developmental psychology to an extraordinary extent". The prize commemorates the German psychologist Kurt Koffka, a pioneer of Gestalt Psychology, in particular in the fields of perception and developmental psychology. Koffka worked at Giessen University for 16 years, from 1911 to 1927. The medal was first awarded in 2007.

The medal is notable among psychologists.

== History ==
Kurt Koffka (18 March 1886 – 22 November 1941) was a German psychologist. He was born and educated in Berlin. Along with Max Wertheimer and his close associate Wolfgang Köhler they established Gestalt psychology. Koffka's wide-ranging interests included perception, hearing impairments in brain-damaged patients, interpretation, learning, and the extension of Gestalt theory to developmental psychology.

Each year since 2006, a committee of Giessen University Department of Psychology has sought nominations and decided on the recipient(s) of the award. The first medal was awarded in 2007 to Martin "Marty" Banks. The one exception was 2020, when the award ceremony was deferred to 2021 because of the COVID-19 pandemic.

== Description of the medal ==
The medal is bronze. The front (obverse) side is shown in the info box. A recipient's name is engraved on the outer ring at the bottom. The other side is an embossed version of the seal of the university.

== Nominations ==
Nomination forms are sent by the members of the Committee to large numbers of individuals, usually in September the year before the award is made. These individuals are generally prominent academics working in a relevant area.

== Selection ==
The members of the Committee prepare a report reflecting the advice of experts in the relevant fields.

== Prizewinners ==
Source: Justus Liebig University, Giessen

- 2007: Martin Banks
- 2008: Claes van Hofsten
- 2009: Janette Atkinson and Oliver Braddick
- 2010: Roberta Klatzky
- 2011: Concetta Morrone and David Burr
- 2012: Sandra Trehub
- 2013: Stuart Anstis
- 2014: Elizabeth Spelke
- 2015: Roland S. Johansson
- 2016: Andrew N. Meltzoff
- 2017: Jan J. Koenderink and Andrea J. van Doorn
- 2018: Karen E. Adolph
- 2019: Dan Kersten
- 2020: No award
- 2021: Linda B. Smith
- 2022: Ted Adelson
- 2023: Richard Aslin
- 2024: Mary Hayhoe
- 2026: Pascal Mamassian

== Gender balance of recipients ==
Unlike some science awards, such as the Nobel Prize, the Kurt-Koffka medal has a good gender balance of recipients (by 2023, 11 men and 9 women).

== See also ==
- Nobel Prize
- Fields Medal
- Ig Nobel Prize
- List of prizes known as the Nobel of a field
- Lists of science and technology awards
- List of psychology awards
