= List of shipwrecks in August 1876 =

The list of shipwrecks in August 1876 includes ships sunk, foundered, grounded, or otherwise lost during August 1876.

== 1 August ==
List of shipwrecks: 1 August 1876
Ship	State	Description
A. J. Pope	Germany	The ship was driven ashore at Cape Henlopen, Delaware, United States. She was on a voyage from Bordeaux, Gironde, France to the Delaware Breakwater.
Lurline	United Kingdom	The fishing smack was driven ashore and wrecked at Aberystwyth, Cardiganshire with the loss of her captain.
Mary Abigail	United Kingdom	The ship was driven ashore and wrecked on the Holy Isle, in the Firth of Forth. She was on a voyage from Glasgow, Renfrewshire to Ballyshannon, County Donegal.
Nouvo Galatea	Italy	The ship was driven ashore at Galipia, Beylik of Tunis. She was on a voyage from Odesa, Russia to an English port.
Usworth	United Kingdom	The steamship ran aground in the River Wear. She was on a voyage from Sunderland, County Durham to Hamburg, Germany. She was refloated with the assistance of tugs and resumed her voyage.

== 2 August ==
List of shipwrecks: 2 August 1876
Ship	State	Description
Celt, and Matin	United Kingdom	The steamships collided in the River Tay and were both severely damaged. Celt was on a voyage from Dundee, Forfarshire to Leith, Lothian. She was beached at Broughty Ferry. Matin was on a voyage from Sunderland, County Durham to Dundee. She was beached at Dundee. She was refloated the next day.
Isabella	United Kingdom	The schooner was driven ashore and wrecked at Castletown, Isle of Man. Her crew were rescued.
Lily	United Kingdom	The coble was driven ashore and wrecked at Scarborough, Yorkshire.
Magic	United Kingdom	The ship departed from Sunderland, County Durham for Margate, Kent. No further trace, posted missing.
Marian	United Kingdom	The coble was driven ashore and wrecked at Scarborough.
Olive Branch	United Kingdom	The fishing smack was driven ashore and wrecked at Ardglass, County Down. Her six crew were rescued by the Coastguard.
Providence	United Kingdom	The fishing yawl was driven ashore at Scarborough. She was on a voyage from Scarborough to Lowestoft, Suffolk. She was refloated with the assistance of the Scarborough Lifeboat and taken in to Scarborough in a severely leaky condition.
Swift	United Kingdom	The fishing lugger was driven ashore and wrecked at Ardtole, County Down. Her crew were rescued.
Wilhelmina Petronella	Netherlands	The galiot foundered in the North Sea. Her crew were rescued. She was on a voyage from Burntisland, Fife, United Kingdom to Königsberg, Germany.
William and Susan	United Kingdom	The fishing boat capsized in the North Sea with the loss of all six crew.
Windbound	United Kingdom	The fishing boat was abandoned in the North Sea 60 nautical miles (110 km) off Fraserburgh. Her four crew were rescued by Chieftain's Bride (United Kingdom).
Young Man's Endeavour	United Kingdom	The sloop foundered off Chapel St. Leonards, Lincolnshire. Her crew were rescued.

== 3 August ==
List of shipwrecks: 3 August 1876
Ship	State	Description
Bethlehem	Germany	The schooner collided with the steamship Phoenix (Norway) and sank off Skagen, Denmark with the loss of two of her crew. Bethlehem was on a voyage from Rotterdam, South Holland, Netherlands to Kiel.
Cornubia	United Kingdom	The yawl ran aground at Ryde, Isle of Wight.
Dagmar	New Zealand	The 45-ton schooner was holed when it was hit by a surging sea while trying to cross the bar at the mouth of the Catlins River, New Zealand. The inflow of water was not noticed immediately, but she was taking in considerable water by the time the ship came close to Nugget Point and the captain ordered her turned towards land ready for beaching. before she reached the coast she was hit by a swell and capsized. The crew clung to the ship's side until they were rescued by the cutter Jane (New Zealand). All hands were saved.
Dorothy and Mary	United Kingdom	The ship was driven ashore at Abersoch, Caernarfonshire.
Edith Marion	United Kingdom	The barque was driven ashore at Cardiff, Glamorgan.
Electric Light	United Kingdom	The fishing boat foundered with the loss of all hands.
Electric Spark	United Kingdom	The fishing boat capsized in the North Sea with the loss of all six crew.
Fannie	United Kingdom	The Mersey Flat sank in the River Mersey at Liverpool, Lancashire.
Greenwich	New Zealand	The 16-ton cutter was wrecked when she stranded on a beach on Māhia Peninsula. All hands were saved.
Hawk	United Kingdom	The steamship ran aground and sank at "Cabezos", 5 nautical miles (9.3 km) north west of Tarifa, Spain. She was on a voyage from Lisbon, Portugal to Bône, Algeria.
Isabella Sillers	United Kingdom	The fishing boat was wrecked at Belhelvie, Aberdeenshire with the loss of three of her seven crew.
Jane	United Kingdom	The fishing lugger sank at Ardglass, County Down. Her crew were rescued.
Jane and Eliza	United Kingdom	The ship was driven ashore at Abersoch.
John Starr	United Kingdom	The barque was wrecked at Kurrachee, India with the loss of sixteen to twenty lives. She was on a voyage from London to Kurrachee.
Jupiter	New Zealand	The 27-ton ketch foundered off the coast of New Zealand's South Island near Sumner when the flukes of the anchor hit the port bow, piercing the hull. All hands were saved.
Kirch	United Kingdom	The steamship ran aground at Dunkirk, Nord, France. She was on a voyage from Constanţa, Ottoman Empire to Dunkirk.
Madcap	United Kingdom	The schooner was run down and sunk off Ailsa Craig by the steamship Owl (United Kingdom) with the loss of two lives.
Margaret	United Kingdom	The fishing cutter was driven ashore and wrecked at Ardglass. Her crew were rescued.
Mount Stewart	United Kingdom	The steamship ran aground at Seaham, County Durham and was damaged. She was refloated with the assistance of two tugs.
Queensland	Queensland	The steamship was run into by the steamship Barrabool (Victoria) and sank off Wilsons Promontory, Victoria with the loss of a crew member. All on board were rescued by Barrabool. Queensland was on a voyage from Melbourne, Victoria to Sydney, New South Wales.
Success	United Kingdom	The fishing boat capsized and sank in the North Sea 25 to 30 nautical miles (46 to 56 km; 29 to 35 mi) off Fraserburgh, Aberdeenshire with the loss of six of her seven crew. The survivor was rescued by the fishing boat A. K. Y. (United Kingdom.
Unnamed	Flag unknown	The sloop foundered off Sutton on Sea, Lincolnshire.
Unnamed	United Kingdom	The Cellardyke-registered fishing boat was wrecked at Peterhead, Aberdeenshire. Her five crew were rescued by the fishing smack Flying Scud (United Kingdom).
Unnamed	United Kingdom	The Port Gordon-registered fishing boat was wrecked at Peterhead with the loss of two of her five crew.
Unnamed	United Kingdom	The Portmahomack-registered fishing boat foundered off Peterhead with the loss of four of her six crew.
Unnamed	United Kingdom	The fishing boat was driven ashore and wrecked at Wick, Caithness with the loss of her captain from her six crew.
Unnamed	United Kingdom	The Mersey Flat sank at Woodside, Cheshire.
Unnamed	United Kingdom	The fishing boat collided with another and drove ashore at Sunderland, County Durham. Her crew were rescued.

== 4 August ==
List of shipwrecks: 4 August 1876
Ship	State	Description
Eaglet	United Kingdom	The steam yacht was driven ashore at Ashton, Renfrewshire.
Earl of Devon	United Kingdom	The ship ran aground at Piel Island, Lancashire and was abandoned by her crew. She was on a voyage from Barrow-in-Furness to Fleetwood.. She was refloated and found to be severely damaged.
Maria Joseph	France	The ketch ran aground on the Bembridge Ledges, off the Isle of Wight, United Kingdom. She was on a voyage from Havre de Grâce, Seine-Inférieure to Falmouth, Cornwall, United Kingdom. She was refloated with the assistance of the Coastguard and taken in to Cowes, Isle of Wight in a waterlogged condition.
Monte Moro	United Kingdom	The steamship struck the Copperas Rock, off the coast of Devon and was wrecked. Her 28 crew were rescued by the tug Electric (United Kingdom). Montero was on a voyage from Newport, Monmouthshire to Montreal, Quebec, Canada.
Perseverant	United Kingdom	The steamship ran aground at Bayonne, Basses-Pyrénées, France. She was on a voyage from Newcastle upon Tyne, Northumberland to Bayonne.
Worthy	United Kingdom	The fishing boat was wrecked near Peterhead, Aberdeenshire. Both crew were rescued.

== 5 August ==
List of shipwrecks: 5 August 1876
Ship	State	Description
Rio	United Kingdom	The brig was abandoned in the English Channel off Cap La Hougue, Manche, France. Her crew were rescued by Juan ( (United Kingdom of Great Britain and Ireland) Guernsey. Rio was on a voyage from Guernsey, Channel Islands to London.

== 6 August ==
List of shipwrecks: 6 August 1876
Ship	State	Description
Clairellen	United Kingdom	The ship ran aground off "Gramsly", Orkney Islands. She was on a voyage from Hull, Yorkshire to Valparaíso, Chile. She was refloated the next day with the assistance of a steamship.
Gamma	United Kingdom	The steamship put in to Malta with a fire in her bunkers. She was on a voyage from London to Malta and the Levant. The fire was extinguished and she resumed her voyage.

== 7 August ==
List of shipwrecks: 7 August 1876
Ship	State	Description
Electric Flash	United Kingdom	The fishing lugger sank at Ardglass, County Down. Her crew were rescued.

== 8 August ==
List of shipwrecks: 8 August 1876
Ship	State	Description
Strang	Sweden	The ship ran aground near Dalarö. She was on a voyage from Torrevieja, Spain to Stockholm. She was refloated.
Trafalgar	United Kingdom	The ship was driven ashore at Darien, Georgia, United States. She was on a voyage from Darien to Amsterdam, North Holland, Netherlands.
Waterwitch	United Kingdom	The schooner was run into by the steamship Tanfield (United Kingdom) and sank at Blackwall, Middlesex. Waterwitch was on a voyage from Guernsey, Channel Islands to London.

== 9 August ==
List of shipwrecks: 9 August 1876
Ship	State	Description
Archangelo	Italy	The ship put in to Barcelona, Spain on fire and was scuttled. She was on a voyage from Hull, Yorkshire, United Kingdom to Genoa. She was refloated on 26 September.
Jansjen	Netherlands	The galiot was driven ashore near Wieringen, North Holland. She was refloated and taken in to Texel, North Holland.
Messenger	United Kingdom	The brigantine ran aground at Ramsgate, Kent. She was refloated and resumed her voyage.
Sanspareil	United Kingdom	The ship ran aground in the River Mersey. She was on a voyage from Runcorn, Cheshire to Newcastle upon Tyne, Northumberland. She was refloated.
Scottish Hero	United Kingdom	The ship was driven ashore in the River Thames at Woolwich, Kent. She was on a voyage from London to Brisbane, Queensland. She was refloated and resumed her voyage.
St. Joseph	Norway	The barque was driven ashore at Lemvig, Denmark. Her crew were rescued. She was on a voyage from Newcastle upon Tyne to Stockholm, Sweden.
Union	United Kingdom	The ship ran aground in the River Mersey and was severely damaged. She was on a voyage from Runcorn to Great Yarmouth, Norfolk. She was refloated and taken in to New Ferry, Cheshire.
Windsor	United Kingdom	The steamship caught fire at Leith, Lothian.

== 10 August ==
List of shipwrecks: 10 August 1876
Ship	State	Description
Arcona	Germany	The steamship ran aground on the Tolbuchin Reef, in the Baltic Sea. She was on a voyage from Stettin to Kronstadt, Russia.
Ellen Dyre	United States	The barque was destroyed by fire off Aarhus, Denmark. Her crew were rescued. She was on a voyage from New York to Fredericia, Denmark.
Kestrel	United States	The ship was driven ashore in Hell Gate. She was on a voyage from New York to Stettin. She was refloated and put back to New York.

== 11 August ==
List of shipwrecks: 11 August 1876
Ship	State	Description
Mauritius	United Kingdom	The steamship struck the pier at Hobb's Point, Pembrokeshire and was beached. She was on a voyage from Glasgow, Renfrewshire to Pembroke.
Mersey	United Kingdom	The steamship was wrecked on Grassholme, Pembrokeshire with the loss of fifteen of her seventeen crew. Survivors were rescued by Europa (United Kingdom). Mersey was on a voyage from Maryport, Cumberland to Antwerp, Belgium.
1,019	Russia	The lighter sank in the Neva.

== 12 August ==
List of shipwrecks: 12 August 1876
Ship	State	Description
Bassoulle	France	The barque collided with Garnock (United Kingdom) and foundered in the Atlantic Ocean (47°37′N 9°07′W). Her crew were rescued by Garnock. Basoulle was on a voyage from Cardiff, Glamorgan, United Kingdom to the Cape of Good Hope, Cape Colony.
Great Queensland	United Kingdom	The full-rigged ship was sighted in the Atlantic Ocean whilst on a voyage from Gravesend, Kent to Melbourne, Victoria. Presumed foundered with the loss of all 71 people on board. A lifeboat from the ship washed up at Fowey, Cornwall in mid-December. A lifebuoy washed up at Dover, Kent on 19 December.

== 13 August ==
List of shipwrecks: 13 August 1876
Ship	State	Description
Flying Scud	United Kingdom	The schooner was run down and sunk in the English Channel off St. Alban's Head, Dorset by the barque Voirlicher (Netherlands). Her crew were rescued by the smack Tommy Dodds (United Kingdom).
Wida	Norway	The barque was driven ashore on Amherst Island, Ontario, Canada. She was on a voyage from Miramichi, New Brunswick, Canada to an English port.

== 14 August ==
List of shipwrecks: 14 August 1876
Ship	State	Description
City of Chester	United Kingdom	The steamship was driven ashore at New York, United States. Her passengers were taken off. She was refloated.
Don Pedro	Portugal	The steamship caught fire and sank in the Atlantic Ocean 23 nautical miles (43 km) west south west of The Smalls. Her 36 crew were rescued by the steamship Atlantic (United Kingdom). Don Pedro was on a voyage from Lisbon to a British port.
Morecambe Queen	United Kingdom	The ship ran aground on Yeoman's bank, in the Irish Sea. She was refloated the next day.
Richard Wright	United Kingdom	The ship was sighted off Port Natal, Natal Colony whilst on a voyage from Bassein, India to Falmouth, Cornwall. No further trace, presumed foundered with the loss of all 25 crew.
Urda	United Kingdom	The ship was wrecked in the Magdalen Islands, Nova Scotia, Canada. Her crew were rescued.

== 15 August ==
List of shipwrecks: 15 August 1876
Ship	State	Description
Jane Wheaton	United Kingdom	The schooner ran aground at Greenisland, County Antrim. She was on a voyage from Glasgow, Renfrewshire to Santos, Brazil.
Maemelon	United Kingdom	The barque was driven ashore and wrecked in Holm Sound, Orkney Islands. Her crew were rescued. She was on a voyage from Sunderland, County Durham to Quebec City, Canada.
Ocean Queen	United Kingdom	The schooner ran aground off "Burr Island", in the Belfast Lough. She was on a voyage from Glasgow to the Rio Grande. She was refloated.
Richard Wright	United Kingdom	The ship departed from Bassein, India for Liverpool, Lancashire. No further trace, presumed foundered with the loss of all 30 crew.
Royal George	United Kingdom	The hulk sank at Portsmouth, Hampshire. She was being towed from Cowes, Isle of Wight to Portsmouth.
Tisgenhoff	Germany	The steamship was run into by the steamship Hilda (United Kingdom) and sank at Danzig.
Unnamed	France	The ship was driven ashore between "Burr Island" and Greenisland. She was refloated and resumed her voyage.

== 16 August ==
List of shipwrecks: 16 August 1876
Ship	State	Description
Carrara	Italy	The ship was driven ashore at Philadelphia, Pennsylvania. She was on a voyage from Philadelphia to Livorno. She was refloated and resumed her voyage.
Hendrika Margaretha	United Kingdom	The koff was wrecked on the Domesnes Reef, in the Baltic Sea. She was on a voyage from Riga, Russia to Veendam, Groningen.
Margaret Knight	United Kingdom	The ship ran aground on the Sow and Pigs Rocks, off the coast of Northumberland. She was on a voyage from London to Blyth, Northumberland. She was refloated with the assistance of a tug.
Reine Seraphine	France	The ship ran aground near Plymouth, Devon, United Kingdom. She was on a voyage from Glasgow, Renfrewshire to Nantes, Loire-Inférieure. She was refloated and resumed her voyage.
Scotstoun	United Kingdom	The ship capsized and sank in the Atlantic Ocean. Her 32 crew took to the boats; they were rescued by the next day by Independence (United States). Scotstoun was on a voyage from Glasgow to San Francisco, California, United States.

== 17 August ==
List of shipwrecks: 17 August 1876
Ship	State	Description
Dawn	United Kingdom	The smack was driven ashore at Scarborough, Yorkshire. She was refloated with assistance from the Scarborough Lifeboat and taken in to Scarborough.
Jocquina	Spain	The schooner was abandoned in the Atlantic Ocean with the loss of four of her seven crew. Survivors were rescued by the steamship Frisia (Germany). Jocquina was on a voyage from San Domingo to Havre de Grâce, Seine-Inférieure, France.
Lammartine	United Kingdom	The ship was wrecked at Santo Domingo Tonalá, Mexico.
Lord Byron	United Kingdom	The steamship ran aground at Maassluis, South Holland, Netherlands. She was on a voyage from Barrow-in-Furness, Lancashire to Rotterdam, South Holland. She was refloated.
Matchless	United Kingdom	The barque departed from Saint Lucia for Falmouth, Cornwall. No further trace, presumed foundered with the loss of all ten crew.
Sussex	Canada	The brigantine sprang a leak and was abandoned in the Atlantic Ocean. Her crew were rescued by Paolo Rivello (Italy). Sussex was on a voyage from Wilmington, North Carolina to Queenstown, County Cork, United Kingdom.

== 18 August ==
List of shipwrecks: 18 August 1876
Ship	State	Description
Malacca	United Kingdom	The steamship was wrecked on the Coromandel Coast 9 nautical miles (17 km) south of Gopaulpore, India.

== 19 August ==
List of shipwrecks: 19 August 1876
Ship	State	Description
Carl Johan	Norway	The barque put in to Vardø in a waterlogged condition. She was on a voyage from Arkhangelsk, Russia to Bristol, Gloucestershire, United Kingdom.
Mystery	United Kingdom	The schooner was driven ashore at South Shields, County Durham. She was refloated and towed in to South Shields.
HMS Wildfire	Royal Navy	The paddle steamer ran aground in the River Medway at Chatham, Kent. She was refloated.
Umgeni	United Kingdom	The ship was driven ashore at Adelaide, South Australia. She was refloated on 31 August.
Unnamed	Germany	The schooner was damaged by fire at Aalborg, Denmark.

== 20 August ==
List of shipwrecks: 20 August 1876
Ship	State	Description
Colonel Elsworth	United States	The fishing Schooner was lost in the Magdalen Islands, Nova Scotia, Canada. Her crew were rescued.
Kestrel	United Kingdom	The steamship ran aground at Liverpool, Lancashire. She was refloated.

== 21 August ==
List of shipwrecks: 21 August 1876
Ship	State	Description
Star of Brunswick	United Kingdom	The ship was driven ashore at New York, United States. She was on a voyage from Calcutta, India to New York. She was refloated.

== 22 August ==
List of shipwrecks: 22 August 1876
Ship	State	Description
Breakley	United Kingdom	The tug collided with the Wallaser ferry Seymour (United Kingdom) and sank in the River Mersey. Her crew survived.
Foam	(United Kingdom of Great Britain and Ireland) Isle of Man	The brigantine was driven ashore near Cairnbulg, Aberdeenshire. She was refloated with the assistance of a tug and taken in to Fraserburgh, Aberdeenshire.
Jane Fairlie	United Kingdom	The ship was driven ashore in the River Thames at Coalhouse Point, Essex. She was on a voyage from Demerara, British Guiana to London.
Murton	United Kingdom	The steamship was driven ashore at Honfleur, Manche, France. She was on a voyage from Hartlepool, County Durham to Honfleur. She was refloated.
Staffa	United Kingdom	The steamship sank in the Caledonian Canal at the entrance to Laggan Loch. She was on a voyage from Glasgow, Renfrewshire to Inverness.

== 23 August ==
List of shipwrecks: 23 August 1876
Ship	State	Description
Arbitrator	United Kingdom	The steamship collided with an iceberg and foundered in the Atlantic Ocean (45°30′N 47°40′W). Her crew were rescued by the brigantine Baltic (United Kingdom). Arbitrator was on a voyage from New Orleans, Louisiana, United States to Liverpool, Lancashire.
Clara Bell	United States	The whaler was sunk by ice off the Seahorse Islands, Department of Alaska.
Iona	United Kingdom	The ship was driven ashore in the Gulf of Finland. She was on a voyage from Saint Petersburg, Russia to Leith, Lothian. She was refloated.
Lord Mar	United Kingdom	The paddle steamer was severely damaged by fire at Leith, Lothian.

== 24 August ==
List of shipwrecks: 24 August 1876
Ship	State	Description
C F Funch	Belgium	The Steinmann, Ludwig & Co. owned steamship had a cargo fire. The ship was beached and broke in two at the Rammekens Castle, Vlissingen, Zeeland, Netherlands.
Emily	United Kingdom	The brig ran aground on the Spit Bank. She was on a voyage from Queenstown, County Cork to Glasgow, Renfrewshire. She was refloated and resumed her voyage.
Soren Berger	Norway	The barque ran aground at Cuxhaven, Germany.
Times	United Kingdom	The steamship ran aground on the Sow and Pigs Rocks, off the coast of Northumberland. She was on a voyage from Rotterdam, South Holland, Netherlands to Leith, Lothian. She was refloated and resumed her voyage.
Tunstall	United Kingdom	The steamship struck a sunken wreck and foundered in the North Sea off Heligoland. Her crew were rescued by the steamship J. B. Eminson (United Kingdom). Tunstall was on a voyage from the Elbe to Sunderland, County Durham.
Weymouth	United Kingdom	The ship ran aground and heeled over at Liverpool, Lancashire. She was righted.

== 25 August ==
List of shipwrecks: 25 August 1876
Ship	State	Description
Commodore	United Kingdom	The steamship collided with a barque and was beached at Dover, Kent. She was on a voyage from Oran, Algeria to London.
Rachel	United Kingdom	The brig departed from Burry Port, Glamorgan for Montreal, Quebec, Canada. No further trace, presumed foundered with the loss of all hands.
Rosina	United Kingdom	The smack collided with the smack Cockatoo (United Kingdom) and sank in the North Sea 150 nautical miles (280 km) off Spurn Point, Yorkshire.

== 26 August ==
List of shipwrecks: 26 August 1876
Ship	State	Description
Flying Cloud	New Zealand	The wreck of the 46-ton schooner was found close to Charleston on 27 August. She had sailed from Charleston the previous day, and a gale had blown up shortly after her departure. Nothing of her crew of four was ever found.
Peerless	United Kingdom	The ship was wrecked on Sal Island, Cape Verde Islands.
705	Russia	The lighter was run down and sunk at Kronstadt by the steamship Minerva (Germany).
Two unnamed vessels	Flags unknown	The ships were driven ashore near Bolderāja, Russia with the loss of one life. Survivors were rescued by the Bolderāja Lifeboat.

== 27 August ==
List of shipwrecks: 27 August 1876
Ship	State	Description
Camille	France	The barque was wrecked at Sierral Leone. She was on a voyage from the Little Scarcies River to Falmouth, Cornwall, United Kingdom.
Dunkeld	United Kingdom	The barque was wrecked on "Hoe Island", in the Gaspar Strait. Her crew were rescued. She was on a voyage from Glasgow, Renfrewshire to Singapore, Straits Settlements.
Grand Duke	United Kingdom	The ship was sighted off the west coast of southern Africa whilst on a voyage from Calcutta, India to Hull, Yorkshire. No further trace, presumed foundered with the loss of all 29 crew.
Jacob	Netherlands	The schooner foundered in the North Sea 12 nautical miles (22 km) off the mouth of the River Tyne. Her five crew were rescued by the schooner Constance (United Kingdom).
Mary Olivia	United Kingdom	The schoner ran aground on the Burbo Bank, in Liverpool Bay and was wrecked with the loss of four of the eight people on board. Survivors were rescued by the steamship Dublin (United Kingdom). Mary Olivia was on a voyage from Par, Cornwall to Liverpool, Lancashire.
St. George	United States	The ship was abandoned off the Seahorse Islands, Department of Alaska. Her crew were rescued by Rainbow and Three Brothers (both United States).

== 28 August ==
List of shipwrecks: 28 August 1876
Ship	State	Description
Fanny Sermes	United Kingdom	The ship was wrecked at Lemvig, Denmark with some loss of life. She was on a voyage from Riga, Russia to Harlingen, Friesland, Netherlands.
Parkfield	United Kingdom	The ship ran aground on the Alquade Reef. She was on a voyage from Aden to Bassein, India. She was reported to have been wrecked, and also to have been refloated and taken in to Diamond Island, Burma.
Patience	Netherlands	The dredger was driven ashore and wrecked at Velsen, North Holland.
Ville de Pontorson	France	The schooner was wrecked on the Haisborough Sands, in the North Sea off the coast of Norfolk, United Kingdom. Her five crew survived. She was on a voyage from Pontorson, Manche to Grimsby, Lincolnshire, United Kingdom.
W	United Kingdom	The schooner ran aground at Lawrence Point, Canada. She was on a voyage from Quebec City, Canada to Plymouth, Devon. W was refloated and towed back to Quebec City in a waterlogged condition. She was placed under repair.
Wild Duck	New South Wales	The barque was driven ashore on Melville Island, South Australia. Her crew survived. She was on a voyage from Newcastle to Singapore, Straits Settlements.

== 29 August ==
List of shipwrecks: 29 August 1876
Ship	State	Description
Jack	United Kingdom	The ship was wrecked at Achowa Point, near Dixcove, Gold Coast.
John and Thomas	United Kingdom	The sloop was driven ashore at Anderby, Lincolnshire. She was refloated on 2 September with assistance from the tug Monarch (United Kingdom) and was taken in tow, but sank in the Humber. Her crew were rescued by Monarch.
Kronprinses Louise	Netherlands	The paddle steamer ran aground on the Gunfleet Sand, in the North Sea off the coast of Essex, United Kingdom. Her crew survived. She was on a voyage from London, United Kingdom to Glückstadt, Germany. She was later refloated and taken in to Brightlingsea, Essex. She was consequently condemned.
Marie	United Kingdom	The steamship ran aground and was wrecked off "Cape Barbas", on the north west coast of Africa. Her 23 crew took to a boat; they were rescued on 3 September by the steamship Volta (United Kingdom). Marie was on a voyage from Gijón, Spain to Bonny, Lagos Colony.
Tunis	United Kingdom	The steamship ran aground on the Sow and Pigs Rocks, off the coast of Northumberland. She was on a voyage from Rotterdam, South Holland, Netherlands to Leith, Lothian. She was refloated with the assistance of a number of tugs and resumed her voyage.

== 30 August ==
List of shipwrecks: 30 August 1876
Ship	State	Description
Globe	France	The barque was wrecked on Madagascar.
Herald	United States	The ship was abandoned in the Indian Ocean. Her crew were rescued by Mofussillte (Flag unknown). Herald was on a voyage from Yloilo, Spanish East Indies to Sandy Hook, New Jersey.
Ich Dien	Germany	The schooner was driven ashore at "Osterbaedda", Finland. Her crew were rescued.
Margaretha Arendina	Netherlands	The schooner was driven ashore on Great Wrangel Island, Russia. Her crew were rescued. She was on a voyage from "Rodwig" to Narva, Russia.
Ville de Pontorson	France	The schooner was wrecked on the Haisborough Sands, in the North Sea off the coast of Norfolk, United Kingdom. Her crew were rescued. She was on a voyage from Pontorson, Manche to Grimsby, Lincolnshire, United Kingdom.
Windsor Castle	Canada	The ship was abandoned in the Atlantic Ocean. Her 26 crew took to two boats; they were rescued on 1 September by the steamship Moselle (United Kingdom). Windsor Castle was on a voyage from Bombay, India to Hull, Yorkshire, United Kingdom.

== 31 August ==
List of shipwrecks: 31 August 1876
Ship	State	Description
Alvoen	Norway	The brig was driven ashore at Granton, Lothian, United Kingdom. She was on a voyage from Narva, Russia to Granton.
Ann Fisher	United Kingdom	The sloop sank in the River Mersey at Birkenhead, Cheshire.
Augusta	United Kingdom	The schooner foundered in the North Sea off the coast of Berwickshire. Her crew were rescued by the steamship Malleable (United Kingdom). Augusta was on a voyage from Sunderland, County Durham to Inverness.
Diamond	United Kingdom	The schooner was driven ashore and wrecked at Whitby, Yorkshire.
Ellida	United Kingdom	The yacht was driven ashore at Ryde, Isle of Wight. She was on a voyage from Ryde to Whitstable, Kent. She was refloated with assistance from the tug Fiery Dragon and towed in to Portsmouth, Hampshire.
Fides	United Kingdom	The ship was driven ashore and wrecked at Dunbar, Lothian with the loss of a crew member. She was on a voyage from "St. Davids" to Vlissingen, Zeeland, Netherlands.
Formosa	United Kingdom	The ship was driven ashore and wrecked at Dunbar. Her crew were rescued. She was on a voyage from Invergordon, Ross-shire to Burntisland, Fife.
Giovanni Battista	Italy	The brig was destroyed by fire off Heraklion, Crete. Her crew were rescued by Guerriero (Italy).
Gipsy Queen	United Kingdom	The ship was driven ashore and wrecked at Fife Ness. Her crew were rescued. She was on a voyage from Lerwick, Shetland Islands to Grangemouth, Stirlingshire.
Innisfallen	United Kingdom	The brig ran aground on Scroby Sands, Norfolk. She was on a voyage from Galaţi, Ottoman Empire to Great Yarmouth, Norfolk. She was refloatedwith assistance the next day and taken in to Great Yarmouth.
Isis	United Kingdom	The brigantine was driven ashore and wrecked at Havre de Grâce, Seine-Inférieure, France. She was on a voyage from Charlestown, Cornwall to Port-en-Bessin, Calvados, France.
Jane Griffiths	United Kingdom	The schooner was driven ashore and wrecked at Swansea, Glamorgan. Her crew were rescued. She was on a voyage from Newhaven, Sussex to Liverpool, Lancashire.
Juno	Sweden	The steamship was driven ashore on Lolland, Denmark. Her crew were rescued. She was on a voyage from Pori, Grand Duchy of Finland to Horsens, Denmark.
Regulus	Germany	The ship was driven ashore and wrecked at Dunbar. Her crew were rescued. She was on a voyage from Riga, Russia to St. Andrews, Fife.
Unnamed	Flag unknown	The ship ran aground on The Mouls, off Padstow, Cornwall.

== Unknown date ==
List of shipwrecks: Unknown date in August 1876
Ship	State	Description
Atlantic	Denmark	The ship was wrecked at Cape Norman, Newfoundland Colony. Her crew were rescued.
Bessie North	United Kingdom	The barque was wrecked at Ensenada, Argentina before 9 August. Her crew were rescued. She was on a voyage from Liverpool, Lancashire to Montevideo, Uruguay.
Bon Père	France	The ship was driven ashore in the Loire. She was on a voyage from Marennes, Charente-Inférieure to Nantes, Loire-Inférieure. She was refloated on 29 August and beached at Paimbœuf, Loire-Inférieure. She was consequently condemned.
Buckinghamshire	New South Wales	The ship ran aground on the Middle Bank, at the mouth of the Columbia River. She was on a voyage from Sydney to Astoria, Oregon, United States. She was refloated and taken in to Astoria.
Camen	Spain	The brig was driven ashore and wrecked on the coast of Mexico before 10 August.
Cycle	United Kingdom	The ship was wrecked in the Strait of Belle Isle. She was on a voyage from Quebec City, Canada to Grangemouth, Stirlingshire.
Eliza Wolsey	United Kingdom	The ship was driven ashore at Breaksea Point, Glamorgan in late August. She was refloated on 9 September and declared a total loss.
Emilie	France	The ship was driven ashore and wrecked at Santa Anna. Her crew survived.
Garnet	United States	The ship was lost off Cape Horn, Chile. She was on a voyage from Newcastle upon Tyne to San Francisco, California.
Germania	Germany	The steamship was wrecked at Bahia, Brazil before 12 August.
Great Queensland	United Kingdom	The iron full-rigged ship was lost with all 72 on board on passage from the Thames to Australia after 12 August, probably due to unstable explosives on board.
Holmestrand	United Kingdom	The ship struck a sunken wreck and was damaged. She was on a voyage from Warrenpoint, County Antrim to Baltimore, Maryland, United States.
Imogene	United Kingdom	The yacht was wrecked on the Richelieu Bank, off La Rochelle, Charente-Inférieure, France. All on board were rescued.
Inga	United Kingdom	The ship ran aground at Quebec City. She was on a voyage from Quebec City to Swansea, Glamorgan. She was refloated and resumed her voyage.
Jean et Camille	France	The barque ran aground at the mouth of the Little Scarcies River and was wrecked. She was on a voyage from the Little Scarcies River to Marseille, Bouches-du-Rhône.
Jewess	United Kingdom	The ship was driven ashore at Maryport, Cumberland. She was refloated on 23 August.
Joaquina	Flag unknown	The barque was abandoned at sea. She was on a voyage from San Domingo to Have de Grâce, Seine-Inférieure, France.
Johanna Maria	Netherlands	The galiot was run down and sunk in the Gulf of Finland by the steamship Ethel (United Kingdom) before 11 August. Her six crew were rescued by Ethel.
J. T. Smith	Canada	The barque was driven ashore at "Amelisland". She was refloated and resumed her voyage.
Leander	United Kingdom	The barque was driven ashore at Port Hastings, Nova Scotia, Canada.
Lincoln	United Kingdom	The full-rigged ship was abandoned off the Cape of Good Hope, Cape Colony before 9 August. Her crew took to the boats; they were rescued by the barque Mary (United Kingdom). Lincoln was on a voyage from Bassein, India to an English port.
Meg Merrilees	United Kingdom	The ship ran aground on the Pluckington Bank, in Liverpool Bay. She was on a voyage from Glasgow, Renfrewshire to Liverpool. She was refloated.
Monarch	United Kingdom	The ship foundered in the Indian Ocean on or before 10 August. She was on a voyage from Rangoon, Burma to Bombay, India. Cargo from the ship washed ashore near Alibag.
Pelayo	Spain	The steamship was driven ashore at Vigo. She was refloated on 16 August and beached.
Petrea	United Kingdom	The ship was driven ashore on "Crane Island". She was on a voyage from Quebec City, Canada to West Hartlepool, County Durham. She was refloated and resumed her voyage.
Rinaldo	United Kingdom	The steamship departed from Oran, Algeria for Cette, Hérault, France in late August. No further trace, presumed foundered with the loss of all hands.
Rob Roy	United Kingdom	The brig was wrecked in the Paracel Islands. Her crew were rescued. She was on a voyage from Hong Kong to London.
Savona	Italy	The barque foundered in the Atlantic Ocean. Her crew were rescued. She was on a voyage from Buenos Aires, Argentina to Antwerp, Belgium.
Sea Chief	United Kingdom	The ship was destroyed by fire at sea before 27 August. Her 30 crew were rescued. She was on a voyage from Calcutta, India to Colombo, Ceylon.
Solent	United Kingdom	The ship was abandoned at sea before 15 August. Her crew were rescued. She subsequently came ashore on "Lepas Island". She was on a voyage from Cardiff, Glamorgan to Japan.
Saines Castle	United Kingdom	The ship ran aground in the River Parrett. She was on a voyage from Quebec City to Bridgwater, Somerset. She was refloated and taken in to Bridgwater in a waterlogged condition.
Theresa	France	The ship ran aground in the Strait of Gibraltar and was damaged. She was on a voyage from Martinique to Marseille. She was refloated and completed her voyage.
Tweed	United Kingdom	The steamship ran aground. She was on a voyage from Odesa, Russia to London. She was refloated and resumed her voyage.
Verbena	United Kingdom	The ship ran aground in the Sea of Azov. She was on a voyage from Taganrog, Russia to Dunkirk, Nord, France. She was refloated and resumed her voyage.
Virago	United Kingdom	The steamship was abandoned in the Atlantic Ocean off Bonny, Lagos Colony.
