= Karen Adolph =

American Psychologist

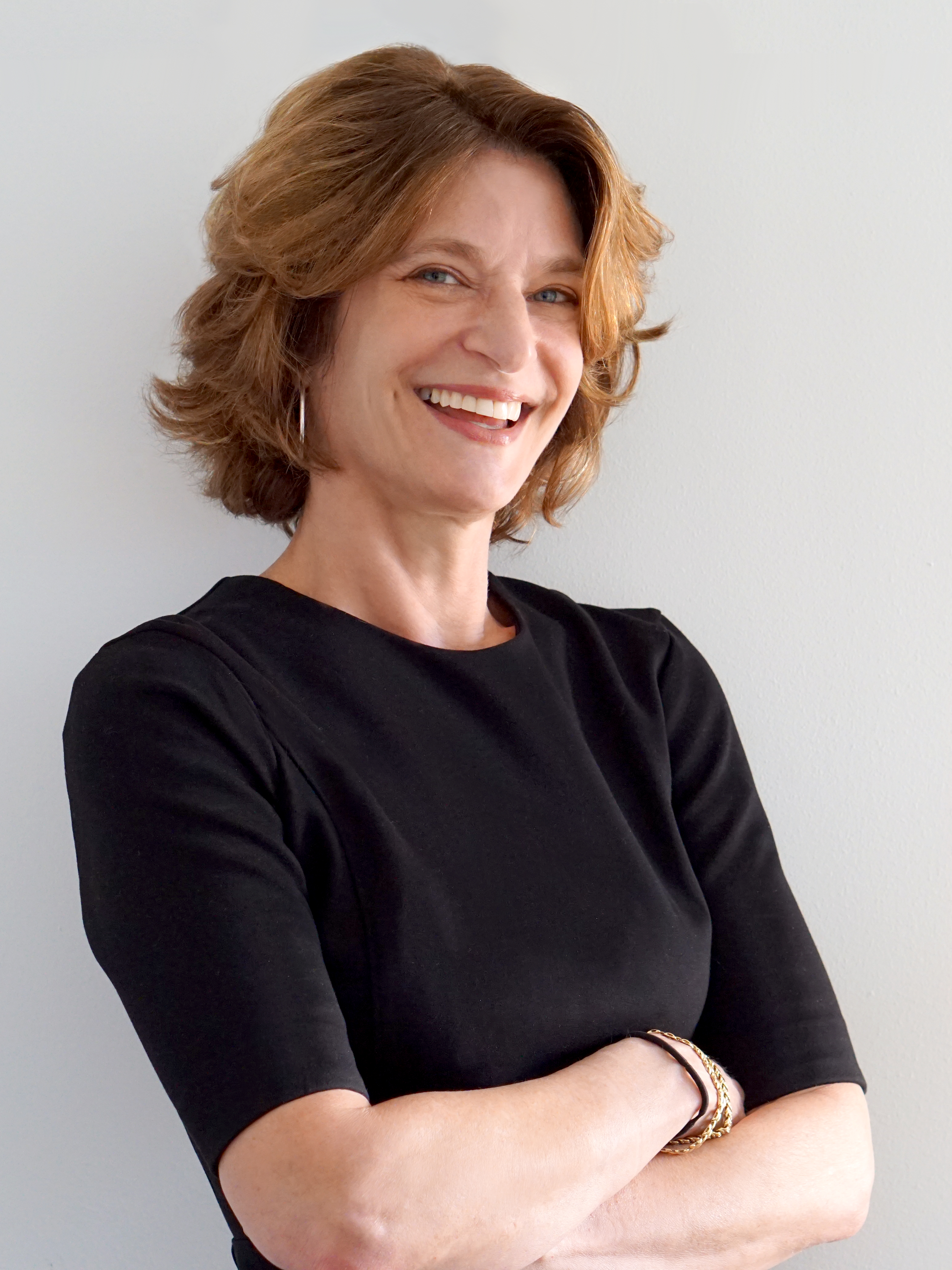
- Karen Adolph in 2019

Academic background
- Education: Sarah Lawrence College; Emory University

Academic work
- Discipline: Developmental Psychology
- Sub-discipline: Infant motor development
- Institutions: New York University
- Website: NYU Faculty Profile

Karen E. Adolph is a psychologist and professor known for her research in the field of infant motor development. She is the 2017 recipient of the Kurt-Koffka medal from the University of Giessen. Previous honors include the 1999 APA Boyd McCandless Award and 2002 American Psychological Foundation Robert L. Fantz Memorial Award. She has served as the President of the International Congress on Infant Studies. Adolph and her colleagues developed computerized video coding software, called Datavyu, and state-of-the-art recording technology to observe and code behavior. A related project, Databrary, provides a repository for video recordings of behavior and encourages open data sharing across research labs. Adolph is a recipient of a MERIT Award from the National Institutes of Child Health and Human Development in support of her innovative research.

== Locomotion ==
One of the Adolph's most heavily studied subjects is Locomotion. She considers it to be the biggest achievement for an infant. In her articles she explains which phases of movement lead to higher accomplishments. For example, "Tripod" sitting is followed by sitting without any need for hands to balance. Babies crawling scooting around on their stomach gives way for them to start crawling around on hands and knees. Infants generally crawl around 9 months of age. After learning to crawl, babies transition to walking around 18 months. This alters infants' vantage points and gives them new perspectives inside their environment.

Locomotion comes along rapidly just like a child's growth, but everything is very gradual and in baby steps. It is important to know all individuals develop differently, and milestones are based on averages. Adolph presents an important part of this developmental stage, which is "learning to learn." She says, "The notion of learning to learn provides a framework for understanding how ongoing actions are adapted to cope with variability and novelty." Adolph discusses how locomotion also encourages infants to explore their environment more and experience challenges such as stair climbing, avoiding dangerous surfaces, and testing the limits of their surroundings. Low impact errors, such as a slight stumble or fall, allow children to continue practicing to crawl, walk, and explore. Adolph and Han found infants are not dissuaded by these many mistakes when learning new developmental skills.

== Biography ==
Adolph received a B.A., in Psychology and Fine Arts in 1986 from Sarah Lawrence College in Bronxville, NY. She went to graduate school at Emory University, in Atlanta GA where she attained her M.A. in Experimental/Developmental Psychology in 1989 and a Ph.D. in Experimental/Developmental Psychology in 1993. In 1994, she completed a postdoctoral fellowship at the Albert Einstein College of Medicine. She worked under Eleanor J. Gibson, Esther Thelen, and Ulric Neisser. She was a member of the faculty at Carnegie Mellon until 1997 when she joined the NYU faculty.

Adolph has held a number of positions over the duration of her career. She presided over the International Congress on Infant Studies until 2016. Additionally, she has chaired the NIH Study Section on Motor Function and Speech Rehabilitation, served on the advisory board of the McDonnell Foundation, and has served on the editorial boards of the journals Developmental Psychobiology and Ecological Psychology. She has been a Fellow of the American Psychological Association and the American Psychological Society since 2006.

She is currently Professor of Psychology and Neural Science at New York University (NYU) where she leads the Infant Action Lab at NYU, focusing on the study of behavioral flexibility in motor development.

== Research ==
Adolph's work examines how individuals learn to adapt to changes in their bodies and develop skills to handle variation in the environment. She examines motor skill acquisition in infant humans and monkeys in order to track learning and development. Although much of her work has focused on infant development, the Infant Action Lab also conducts studies with children and adults. One of their main research methodologies involves developing tasks that challenge infants, children, and adults with novel predicaments, such as crawling over bridges, squeezing through apertures, swinging over monkey bars, and reaching for targets with the body in motion. Adolph has studied infant locomotion and coordination by using infant head-mounted eye-tracking cameras to examine infants' patterns of visual attention as they played in a toy filled room with their mothers. Another developmental skill Adolph has explored is stair climbing, detailing the challenges for infants to learn stair climbing due to their strength and coordination levels.

== Awards and honors ==
Adolph was awarded the FIRST Award from the National Institute of Child Health and Human Development from 1996 to 2001, the APA Boyd McCandless Award in 1998, the Young Investigator Award from the International Congress for Infant Studies in 1998, the James McKeen Cattell Sabbatical Award from 2001 to 2002, the American Psychological Foundation Robert L. Fantz Memorial Award in 2002, the MERIT Award from the National Institute of Child Health and Human Development from 2006 to 2016, and the Golden Dozen Teaching Award from NYU in 2015. In 2018, Adolph won the Kurt Koffka Medal, awarded by Giessen University for "advancing the fields of perception or developmental psychology to an extraordinary extent".

== Representative publications ==
- Adolph, K. E. (2008). Learning to move. Current Directions in Psychological Science, 17(3), 213–218.
- Adolph, K. E. (2000). Specificity of learning: Why infants fall over a veritable cliff. Psychological Science, 11(4), 290–295.
- Berger, S.E., Adolph, K.E. (2007). Learning and development in infant locomotion. Prog Brain Res. 164:237-55.
- Berger, S.E., Theuring C., Adolph, K.E. (2007) How and when infants learn to climb stairs. Infant Behav Dev.30(1):36-49.
