= Oliver Braddick =

British developmental psychologist (1944–2022)

Oliver Braddick FBA, FMedSci
- Born: 16 November 1944
- Died: 17 January 2022 (aged 77)
- Education: Cambridge University (PhD, 1968)
- Scientific career
- Fields: Experimental psychology, Developmental psychology, Visual perception
- Workplaces: University of Oxford
- Thesis: Binocular fusion and perceptual analysis (1968)
- Doctoral advisor: Richard Gregory
- Doctoral students: Vilayanur S. Ramachandran

Oliver John Braddick (16 November 1944 – 17 January 2022) was a British developmental psychologist who researched infant visual perception. He frequently collaborated with his wife Janette Atkinson.

== Biography ==
Braddick was Emeritus Professor of Experimental Psychology at Oxford University from 2011 to 2022. Prior to that, from 2001 to 2011 he was professor and head of the Department of Experimental Psychology.

Braddick gained a BA (1965) and PhD (1968) in Experimental Psychology at Trinity College, Cambridge. Between 1968 and 1969 he was a post-doctoral fellow in the laboratory of Lorrin Riggs, Brown University, USA. In 1969 he returned to Cambridge as a University Demonstrator; later he became a lecturer and then reader. By 1976, Braddick was an active member of the Cambridge Visual Development Unit, along with Janette Atkinson, his wife. The unit carried out pioneering research on the development of visual cortical function in infancy and in early visual screening. He also advanced understanding of binocular processes of both infants and adults.

In 1993, Braddick and Janette Atkinson moved to University College London as professors of Psychology. He became head of the Psychology department in 1998. In 2001, he was elected fellow of the Academy of Medical Sciences, was appointed Head of Psychology at the University of Oxford, and became a Fellow at Magdalen College, Oxford. In July 2012, Braddick was elected as a Fellow of the British Academy for his contributions in the field of visual perception and its development in early childhood. Braddick was also a member of the Visual Development Unit at the University College of London and University of Oxford, a unit that specialises in child visual perception.

Braddick was a member of the editorial board for Current Biology. He died on 17 January 2022, at the age of 77.

== Research ==
Braddick specialised in infant vision, particularly visual and visuomotor development of the dorsal and ventral streams in infants and children. In infancy, visual traits determine a manual response and the kinematic parameters of each type of response, including reach-and-grasp and surface exploration. These responses reflect the properties of visuo-motor modules which appear in infants from 4 to 12 months old. Because these modules are part of the dorsal cortical stream, they interact with the ventral stream processing in development and in the mature system. Braddick also researched perceptual development of infants with hyperopia.

In addition to working on infant vision, Braddick and colleagues showed that adults attempting to grab a glowing item in the dark had a longer reach duration, lower average speed, as well as lower peak speed versus the same situation in the light.

According to Braddick, reliable motion perception requires several processes that integrate and combine visual motion signals from neighbouring locations within the field of vision. This has the effect of smoothing out spatial variations in velocity.

== Selected publications ==
- Atkinson, Janette; Braddick, Oliver; Nardini, Marko; Anker, Shirley (2007). "Infant Hyperopia: Detection, Distribution, Changes and Correlates-Outcomes From the Cambridge Infant Screening Programs". Optometry and Vision Science. 84 (2): 84–96. doi:10.1097/OPX.0b013e318031b69a. PMID 17299337. S2CID 39967549.
- Braddick, Oliver; Birtles, Deirdre; Wattam-Bell, John; Atkinson, Janette (2005). "Motion- and orientation-specific cortical responses in infancy". Vision Research. 45 (25–26): 3169–79. doi:10.1016/j.visres.2005.07.021. PMID 16137739.
- Braddick, Oliver; Atkinson, Janette; Wattam-Bell, John (2003). "Normal and anomalous development of visual motion processing: motion coherence and 'dorsal-stream vulnerability'". Neuropsychologia. 41 (13): 1769–1784. doi:10.1016/S0028-3932(03)00178-7. PMID 14527540. S2CID 35205340.
- Mason, A JS; Braddick, O J; Wattam-Bell, J (2003). "Motion coherence thresholds in infants—different tasks identify at least two distinct motion systems". Vision Research. 43 (10): 1149–1157. doi:10.1016/S0042-6989(03)00077-4. PMID 12705955. S2CID 8875803.
- Braddick, Oliver J; Wishart, Keith A; Curran, William (2002). "Directional performance in motion transparency". Vision Research. 42 (10): 1237–1248. doi:10.1016/S0042-6989(02)00018-4. PMID 12044756.
- Gunn, Alison; Cory, Elizabeth; Atkinson, Janette; Braddick, Oliver; Wattam-Bell, John; Guzzetta, Andrea; Cioni, Giovanni (2002). "Dorsal and ventral stream sensitivity in normal development and hemiplegia". NeuroReport. 13 (6): 843–847. doi:10.1097/00001756-200205070-00021. PMID 11997698. S2CID 22063065.
- Atkinson, J; Anker, S; Braddick, O; Nokes, L; Mason, A; Braddick, F (2001). "Visual and visuospatial development in young children with Williams syndrome". Developmental Medicine & Child Neurology. 43 (5): 330–337. doi:10.1111/j.1469-8749.2001.tb00213.x. PMID 11368486.
- Braddick, O J; O'Brien, J M; Wattam-Bell, J; Atkinson, J; Turner, R (2000). "Form and motion coherence activate independent, but not dorsal/ventral segregated, networks in the human brain" (PDF). Current Biology. 10 (12): 731–734. Bibcode:2000CBio...10..731B. doi:10.1016/S0960-9822(00)00540-6. PMID 10873810.
- Curran, W; Braddick, O J; Atkinson, J; Wattam-Bell, J; Andrew, R (1999). "Development of illusory-contour perception in infants". Perception. 28 (4): 527–538. doi:10.1068/p2845. PMID 10664792. S2CID 29944681.
