= Schöner =

Schöner is a German surname, also rendered as Schoener or Schoner

- Eberhard Schoener (born 1938), German musician and composer
- George Schoener (1864–1941), German-born Roman-catholic priest and breeder of roses
  - Rosa 'Schoener's Nutkana'
- Gregor Schöner (born 1958), German musician and composer
- Ingeborg Schöner (born 1935), German actress
- Johannes Schöner (1477–1547), German mathematician, geographer, cartographer, astronomer
  - Johannes Schöner globe
- Martin Schöner (d. 1611), German physician to James VI and I of England and Anna of Denmark

== See also ==
- Schön
