= Stuart Anstis =

American psychologist

Stuart M. Anstis is a British professor emeritus of psychology at the University of California, San Diego.

== Biography ==
Anstis was born in the United Kingdom. He went to Winchester, and then to Corpus Christi, Cambridge, where he did his PhD under Richard Gregory. While at Corpus Christi College, Anstis was awarded the Bishop Greene Silver Cup for the best undergraduate result of the year (first class honors in Moral Sciences Part 1). He also received a Lazard scholarship, which took him to Paris for three months to study post-WW2 French Cinema. He had teaching posts at the University of Bristol in the UK, at York University in Toronto and – from 1991 – at the University of California, San Diego. He is a fellow of the Society of Experimental Psychologists. In 2013, Anstis won the Kurt Koffka Medal for "advancing the field of perception ... to an extraordinary extent". In 2026, he won a Dickson award from the University of California, San Diego for having published 56 papers since his retirement in 2014.

== Books ==
- George Mather, Frans Verstraten, Stuart Anstis (1998). The Motion Aftereffect: A Modern Perspective. Cambridge, Massachusetts; London: MIT Press.
