= Davida Teller =

American psychologist

Davida Young Teller
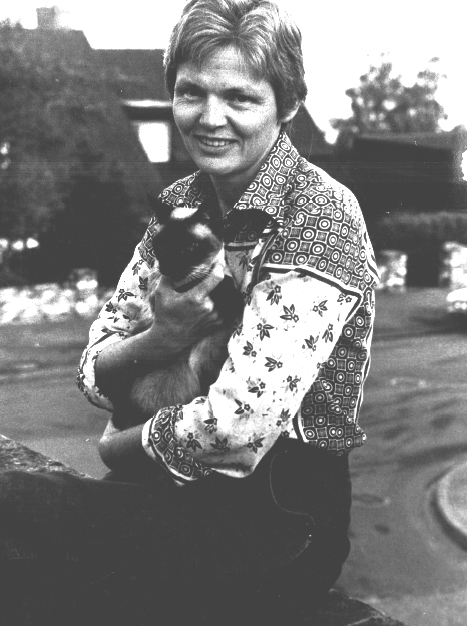
- Born: July 25, 1938; Yonkers, New York
- Died: October 11, 2011 (aged 73); Seattle, Washington, USA
- Education: Swarthmore College; University of California, Berkeley (PhD)
- Known for: Pioneering the scientific study of infant visual development. Development of the Teller Acuity Cards.
- Spouses: David Teller; Anthony Young
- Children: 2
- Awards: Friedenwald Award (Association for Research in Vision and Ophthalmology); Glenn Fry Award (American Academy of Optometry)
- Scientific career
- Fields: Psychology; Physiology/biophysics
- Workplaces: University of Washington
- Thesis: The influence of borders on increment thresholds (1965)
- Doctoral advisor: Tom N. Cornsweet

Davida Young Teller (July 25, 1938 – October 11, 2011) was a professor in the Departments of Psychology and Physiology/Biophysics at the University of Washington, Seattle, Washington. She was a leader in the scientific study of infant visual development.

== Personal life and education ==
Davida Young Teller was born in Yonkers, New York on July 25, 1938, to David and Jean (Sturges) Young. Davida and her four siblings (Richard, Jean Poole, Daniel, and Samuel) spent their childhood years in Connecticut. Davida attended Swarthmore College on a fellowship. After graduation, she attended graduate school at the University of California, Berkeley, receiving her PhD degree in the field of psychology, with Professor Tom Cornsweet as her dissertation advisor. She then completed a postdoctoral fellowship with Professor Horace Barlow at the University of California, Berkeley.

Davida Young married David C. Teller (d. 2019), who received a PhD degree in biochemistry from the University of California, Berkeley, in 1965, and who subsequently became a faculty member in the Department of Biochemistry at the University of Washington. The couple had two children: Stephen and Sara. Following a divorce, Davida married her second husband, Anthony W. Young (d. 2016), an oceanography technician and later, a customs clerk. Davida Teller died on October 11, 2011, in Seattle, Washington.

== Professional career ==
=== Academic appointment ===
In 1965, Davida Teller joined the Department of Psychology at the University of Washington as a Research Assistant Professor. In 1967, she received a joint appointment in the Department of Physiology/Biophysics. She remained a faculty member in both departments until 2004, when she retired and was granted Emerita status. Teller's talent as an educator was recognized formally when the graduate students in the Department of Psychology at the University of Washington established the Davida Teller Distinguished Faculty Award. This award is presented annually to a faculty member chosen by the graduate students. Professor Teller was the award's first recipient.

=== Research interests ===
==== Visual detection and discrimination ====
Teller's initial research studies were focused on the spatial and temporal properties of a phenomenon first described by Professor Gerald Westheimer and sometimes referred to as the “Westheimer effect” or the “Westheimer function.” In this phenomenon, which Teller termed “spatial sensitization,” the detectability of a test light is first decreased and then increased by adding light to successively larger surrounding or annular regions. Westheimer proposed that the increase in detectability with surround illumination might represent the manifestation of lateral inhibition within the retina, and this possibility motivated Teller's interest in the phenomenon.

==== Visual development ====
In the early 1970s, following the birth of her children, Davida Teller began her studies of infant visual development that were to be the main topic of her research for the remainder of her career. In order to assess the visual capabilities of infants, she combined the visual preference technique of Robert L. Fantz with signal detection theory. The result was the forced-choice preferential looking (FPL) procedure. In this approach, an observer who is masked as to the location of a visual target has to judge the location of the target based on the direction of an infant’s gaze. Some characteristic of the target, such as its size, color, or speed of movement, is varied across trials. A psychometric function is then derived in which the observer's percent correct value is plotted as a function of target attribute. The level of target attribute that corresponds to a criterion percent correct value is used as the measure of the sensory threshold. The FPL technique, which has also been applied to infant monkeys, has produced a wealth of information about normal and abnormal visual development. However, an unresolved issue is the extent to which the FPL technique (or any psychophysical technique, for that matter) measures the best possible visual capacity of an infant, animal, or patient.

Interest in a clinical application of the FPL procedure led Teller and her colleagues to develop the Teller Acuity Cards, which are now used in eye clinics around the world to measure the visual acuity of infants and young children as well as of non-verbal older individuals. On one side of each card is a pattern of black and white stripes (square wave grating). The remainder of the card consists of a uniform gray matched to the average light level of the stripes. Each card contains a different stripe width. The tester observes the infant through a peephole in the center of the card and attempts to determine the side that contains the stripes, based on the infant's looking behavior. The smallest stripe width that elicits a reliable judgment of stripe location by the observer provides a measure of the visual acuity of the infant or young child.

==== Linking propositions ====
A major theme underlying Davida Teller's research was the nature of the relationship between visual phenomena and their neural underpinnings. This interest stemmed in part from G. S. Brindley's discussion of what he termed "psychophysical linking hypotheses." Her interest was also stimulated by the ideas of her postdoctoral mentor, Professor Barlow, about the "neuron doctrine," which explored the "relationship between the firing of single neurons in sensory pathways and subjectively experienced sensations." Teller formalized her thinking on this topic in publications that described “linking propositions,” i.e. assumptions about the relationship between perceptual and physiological states. In her article "Linking Propositions," Teller (1984) severely criticized the casual use of such assumptions, discussing logical problems including lack of face validity. She concludes that: "..visual scientists often introduce unacknowledged, non-rigorous steps into their arguments...It would seem useful...to encourage visual scientists to make linking propositions explicit, so that linking propositions can be subjected to the requirements of consistency and the risks of falsification appropriate to the evaluation of all scientific propositions." Surprisingly, perhaps, many, if not all, of the propositions flagged by Teller continue to form the basis of data interpretation in psychophysics today. An interest in linking propositions can be seen in Teller's early work on spatial sensitization, which was thought to represent the action of lateral inhibition, and it remained a theme of her research on infant vision, in which she sought to define the constraints imposed on infant visual performance by the developing central nervous system.

== Advocacy for women in science ==
Beginning with her graduate student years in Berkeley, California, Davida Teller was a strong supporter of, and model for, the role of women in science and academia. Teller's long-standing advocacy for women in science was recognized formally following her death by the establishment of the Davida Teller Award of the Vision Sciences Society. This award is presented annually to a woman who has made exceptional contributions to the field of vision science and who has a strong history of mentoring.

== Recognition ==
Scientific awards

- Glenn A. Fry Lecture Award from the American Academy of Optometry (AAO), 1982.
- Friedenwald Award from the Association for Research in Vision and Ophthalmology (ARVO), 1997.
- Fellow of the Optical Society of America (OSA).
- Fellow of the Society of Experimental Psychologists (SEP).
- Fellow of the American Association for the Advancement of Science (AAAS).

Academic award

- Honorary Doctor of Science degree from the State University of New York, 1992.
