= Mary Hayhoe =

Vision scientist

Mary Myleen Hayhoe
- Education: University of Queensland; University of Cambridge; University of California, San Diego
- Scientific career
- Workplaces: University of Rochester; University of Texas Austin
- Thesis: Lateral interaction in the control of sensitivity during dark adaptation (1979)

Mary Myleen Hayhoe is an Australian American psychologist who researches vision. She has developed virtual environments for the investigation of visually guided behaviour. In 2017, Hayhoe was awarded the Vision Sciences Society's Davida Teller Award. In 2002, she was awarded the Optica's Edgar D. Tillyer Award for her contributions to visual perception and cognition. In 2024, Hayhoe was awarded the Kurt Koffka Medal for "advancing the fields of perception or developmental psychology to an extraordinary extent".

== Early life and education ==
Hayhoe is from Australia. She was an undergraduate student at the University of Queensland, where she majored in psychology and mathematics. She then moved to England and studied at the University of Cambridge from 1970-1973. In 1973, Hayhoe moved to the United States, and joined Florida State University as a research associate in psychology. Hayhoe joined the University of California, San Diego for graduate research, where she studied how eyes adapt to dark light environments.

== Career and research ==
Hayhoe was appointed to the faculty at the University of California, Irvine and Columbia University. She moved to the University of Rochester in 1984, where she was promoted from assistant to associate and eventually full professor. In 1998, she was made Director of the Cognitive Science Program. In 2006, Hayhoe left Rochester and joined the University of Texas at Austin.

Hayhoe's research considers visual sensation and the relationships between vision and movement.

== Awards and honours ==
- 1970 Commonwealth Scholarship
- 1993 Fellow of Optica
- 2012 Bielefeld University Fellowship
- 2017 Vision Sciences Society's Davida Teller Award
- 2018 Elected Fellow of the Society of Experimental Psychologists
- 2022 Optica's Edgar D. Tillyer Award
- 2024 University of Giessen's Kurt Koffka Medal

== Selected publications ==
- Dana H. Ballard; Mary M. Hayhoe; Polly K. Pook; Rajesh P. N. Rao (1 December 1997). "Deictic codes for the embodiment of cognition". Behavioral and Brain Sciences. 20 (4, 04): 723-42; discussion 743-67. doi:10.1017/s0140525x97001611. ISSN 0140-525X. PMID 10097009. Wikidata Q33546175.
- Mary Hayhoe; Dana Ballard (1 April 2005). "Eye movements in natural behavior". Trends in Cognitive Sciences. 9 (4): 188–194. doi:10.1016/j.tics.2005.02.009. ISSN 1364-6613. PMID 15808501. Wikidata Q36088630.
- M. F. Land; M. Hayhoe (1 January 2001). "In what ways do eye movements contribute to everyday activities?". Vision Research. 41 (25–26): 3559–3565. doi:10.1016/s0042-6989(01)00102-x. ISSN 0042-6989. PMID 11718795. Wikidata Q34445917.
