= Progress in Brain Research =

Series of neuroscience books published by Elsevier

- Cover of volume 196, Optogenetics, 2012
- Edited by: Stephen Waxman, Donald G. Stein, Dick Swaab, Howard Fields
- Language: English
- Discipline: Neuroscience
- Publisher: Elsevier
- Published: 1963–present
- No. of books: >200
- Website: www.elsevier.com/books/book-series/progress-in-brain-research

Progress in Brain Research is a series of academic books on neuroscience published by Elsevier. The first volume appeared in 1963 and as of January 2014, 207 volumes have been published. The editors-in-chief of the series are Stephen Waxman (Yale University School of Medicine), Donald G. Stein (Emory University), Dick Swaab (Netherlands Institute for Neuroscience), Howard Fields (University of California). Despite being a book series, Progress in Brain Research is abstracted and indexed in the Science Citation Index and according to the Journal Citation Reports, the series has a 2012 impact factor of 4.191. Each volume has its own International Standard Book Number (ISBN). In addition, the series has an International Standard Serial Number (print: ISSN 0079-6123, online: ISSN 1875-7855). The series is also abstracted and indexed in Index Medicus/MEDLINE/PubMed.
