= Jack D. Cowan =

British mathematician (1933–2025)

Jack D. Cowan (1933–2025) was a British mathematician and theoretical neuroscientist, recognized for his pioneering work in mathematical biology and computational neuroscience. He is best known for co-developing the Wilson–Cowan equations, a foundational model describing the dynamics of interacting populations of neurons.

Cowan c.1997

== Early life and education ==
Jack David Cowan was born in Leeds, England, in 1933. His grandparents had emigrated from Lithuania in the early 20th century. At age six, his family moved to Edinburgh, Scotland. He attended George Heriot’s School, where he won academic prizes and graduated as the highest-achieving student in his year.

Cowan studied physics at the University of Edinburgh and graduated in 1955. He worked at Ferranti Labs in Edinburgh on early computing projects. He also spent a year at Imperial College London working with engineer Arthur Porter and interacting with physicist Dennis Gabor. He later completed his PhD at the Massachusetts Institute of Technology, where he was influenced by cybernetics pioneer Norbert Wiener.

== Academic career ==
In 1967, Cowan succeeded Nicolas Rashevsky as chair of the Committee on Mathematical Biology at the University of Chicago. He held professorships in mathematics and was affiliated with the university’s PhD program in computational neuroscience.

In 1977, he was a visiting researcher at the Max Planck Institute for Biophysical Chemistry in Göttingen and received the Humboldt Senior Scientist Award.

In 2022, he became professor emeritus at the University of Chicago.

== Research contributions ==
=== Wilson–Cowan Model ===
In the early 1970s, Cowan and Hugh R. Wilson developed a mathematical model describing how populations of excitatory and inhibitory neurons interact. The Wilson–Cowan equations are nonlinear differential equations that simulate collective neural behavior.

This population-based approach shifted the focus of theoretical neuroscience to large-scale brain networks. The equations explain oscillations, pattern formation, and threshold dynamics in neural tissue.

The model became influential in studies of the visual cortex, where Cowan and others used it to explain how geometric hallucinations—such as spirals, tunnels, lattices, and gratings—emerge spontaneously during altered states. These patterns, known as form constants, were first identified by Heinrich Klüver.

Cowan showed that these hallucinations arise from the architecture of the primary visual cortex (V1), particularly its retinotopic and orientation-based organization. By modeling V1 as a sheet of neural populations with lateral interactions governed by the Wilson–Cowan model, researchers could reproduce the spatial symmetries and instabilities seen in hallucinations.

Beyond hallucinations, the model explains basic visual processing functions like contrast detection, orientation tuning, and binocular rivalry.

=== Neural phase transitions ===
Cowan proposed that transitions between different patterns of brain activity resemble phase transitions in physical systems, such as the shift from liquid to solid. In a 2016 University of Chicago article, Cowan likened the brain’s resting state to Brownian motion, with cognitive states emerging as structured patterns during critical transitions.

== Legacy and influence ==
Cowan’s models continue to shape theoretical neuroscience, artificial intelligence, and complex systems analysis. A 2014 symposium, “CowanFest,” celebrated his contributions to brain modeling.

Jack D. Cowan died in 2025 at the age of 91.

== Selected publications ==
- Wilson, H. R., & Cowan, J. D. (1972). "Excitatory and inhibitory interactions in localized populations of model neurons." Biophysical Journal, 12(1), 1–24.
- Cowan, J. D., Neuman, J., & van Drongelen, W. (2016). "Wilson–Cowan equations for neocortical dynamics." Journal of Mathematical Neuroscience, 6(1), 1.
- Butler, T. C., Benayoun, M., Wallace, E., van Drongelen, W., & Cowan, J. D. (2012). "Evolutionary constraints on visual cortex architecture from the dynamics of hallucinations." PNAS, 109(2), 606–609. doi:[10.1073/pnas.1114574109](https://doi.org/10.1073/pnas.1114574109)
