= Esther Thelen =

American developmental psychologist (1941–2004)

- Born: 20 May 1941; Brooklyn, New York, United States
- Died: 29 December 2004 (aged 63); Bloomington, Indiana
- Education: Antioch College; University of Wisconsin; University of Missouri
- Known for: Developmental psychology dynamical systems theory neuroscience

Esther Thelen (May 20, 1941 – December 29, 2004) was an expert in the field of developmental psychology. Thelen's research was focused on human development, especially in the area of infant development.

Thelen was also president of the Society for Research in Child Development and the International Society for Infant Studies. She was a Fellow of the American Association for the Advancement of Science and American Psychological Society.

== Infant development ==
Thelen is known for her works on infant development, particularly those that focused on complex movement and behavioral development. Thelen applied chaos theory to the research of how babies learn to walk and interact with the world around them. In Thelen's view behavior emerges as a pattern from all the streams that flow into the river of infant development. Or, as she wrote "The mind simply does not exist as something decoupled from the body and experience". She suggested that an infant already has basic motor patterns at birth as demonstrated by stepping reflex and spontaneous kicking.

== Development model ==
Thelen's works expanded Gerald Edelman's model of development by proposing a broader conceptualization of development. Edelman, in his theory of neuronal development, showed that development occurs in the brain between neuro-networks that overlap and interconnect. The epigenetic process of neural development is grounded in the idea of experience-dependent changes which is development or growth by selectively and simultaneously reinforcing neural pathways. As children, humans are constantly moving and interacting. Visual and kinematic information becomes mapped together in the brain and the pathways are strengthened and retained through every interaction. When the child encounters a novel or new skill, the child takes a similar previously learned motor map and applies it to the new novel skill. As the novel skill develops into a new behavior, it then in turn can be used to help develop future skills. Recurrent activities in the world reinforce this Dynamical systems theory of development and helps explain the constructivist view of the Developmental Systems Theory. Thelen's contribution in this area involves the notion that the nature of physical development is not absolute but flexible.

According to Thelen, development is self-reorganization (with the self pertaining to the system instead of the psychoanalytic self) that emerges due to the interaction of the system/organization/person with another or the environment.

== Neural connections ==
Edelman used the terms reentrant and degenerate in order to describe these complex neural connections. Reentrant was defined as a complex interwoven system in which the output can feed back into the input. Reentry is a two way straight that can run in parallel. Degenerate was explained by saying that the pathway can be jointly determined by multiple causes and isn't determined by just one thing. This joint determination by multiple causality is one major theme of developmental systems theory that also overlaps with the dynamical systems theory by Esther Thelen. An example of how multiple causes can lead to one action is human movement. In the body, the brain can send many different signals to cause movements such as speech. These signals sent from the brain go to many different muscles in order to control the movement as we speak a word. Figure 3 (shown at right) shows in a very simplistic way the directionality of the neural connections.

== Embodiment in perseverative reaching ==
Esther Thelen used A-not-B error as an example of how movement is complex. In figure 6, Esther Thelen illustrated the use of movement parameters in the decision for the infant to move to either A position or B position. As stated in the dynamical systems theory in order for movement to occur, the control parameter must be scaled up above the threshold. The input given to the child by the placing of the toy or the hinting at a certain cover is the specific input. This also factors into the decisions needing to be made in order for the child to make a movement towards the toy. Making a decision as to where to move and the actual movement towards the toy is time dependent. Three aspects factor into the time taken in making this decision and making the movement. These factors include transiet and tonic visual input and the infants memory of the toy location. The task input begins with the first movement towards the toy. After the second time for the child to reach for the toy after it has been hidden under the cover the child is using specific input. This specific input is from their memory of their first time reaching for the toy. This input is displayed in Figure 7. After making that first move towards position A, a memory has been formed. By the time the second movement towards position A occurs, more input is allowed to contribute to the decision. However, after many movements towards position A, this memory becomes very strong. Despite showing the child that the toy is at position B the child will still move towards position A seeking the toy. This can be displayed in Figures 8 and 9.

== Selected publications ==
- Linda B. Smith, and Esther Thelen (September 1993). A Dynamic Systems Approach to Development. MIT Press. ISBN 0-262-19333-7
- Esther Thelen, Gregor Schöner, Christian Scheier, and Linda B. Smith (2001). "The dynamics of embodiment: A field theory of infant perseverative reaching". Behavioral and Brain Sciences 24(1), 1–34. doi:10.1017/S0140525X01003910
