= Linda B. Smith =

Developmental psychologist

Linda Smith
- Occupations: Distinguished Professor and Chancellor's Professor of Psychological and Brain Science, and of Cognitive Science
- Awards: Rumelhart Prize (2013); APA Award for Distinguished Scientific Contributions (2013); Norman Anderson Lifetime Achievement Award - Society of Experimental Psychologists (2019); Elected Member, National Academy of Sciences (2019)

Academic background
- Education: Ph.D. in Psychology
- Alma mater: University of Pennsylvania, University of Wisconsin–Madison

Academic work
- Sub-discipline: Developmental Psychology, Cognitive Science
- Institutions: Indiana University

Linda B. Smith (born 1951) is an American developmental psychologist internationally recognized for her theoretical and empirical contributions to developmental psychology and cognitive science, proposing, through theoretical and empirical studies, a new way of understanding developmental processes. Smith's works are groundbreaking and illuminating for the field of perception, action, language, and categorization, showing the unique flexibility found in human behavior. She has shown how perception and action are ways of obtaining knowledge for cognitive development and word learning.

With Esther Thelen, she co-authored the books A Dynamic Systems Approach to the Development of Cognition and Action and A Dynamic Systems Approach to Development: Applications, which approach child development from a dynamic systems perspective, including problems of continuity and discontinuities and nonlinear outcomes.

Smith is a Distinguished Professor and Chancellor's Professor of Psychological and Brain Sciences at Indiana University.

== Honors and awards ==
- American Psychological Association (APA) Distinguished Scientific Awards for an Early Career Contribution to Psychology (1985)
- Tracy Sonneborn Award, Indiana University's highest award to its faculty (1997)
- Titled Professor - Class of '69 Chancellor's Professor (1997)
- Fellow of the American Academy of Arts and Sciences (2007)
- Distinguished Professor at Indiana University (2008)
- Rumelhart Prize from the Cognitive Science Society (2013)
- APA Award for Distinguished Scientific Contributions (2013)
- APS William James Fellow Award (2018)
- Norman Anderson Lifetime Achievement Award from the Society of Experimental Psychologists (2019)
- Honors from the Federation of Associations in Behavioral & Brain Sciences (2019)
- Member of the National Academy of Sciences (2019)
- Bicentennial Medal (2020)

== Biography ==
Smith grew up in Portsmouth, NH as the second of five children. Smith received her B.S. degree in Experimental Psychology at University of Wisconsin (1973), doing her honor's thesis with Sheldon Ebenholtz. Smith completed her Ph.D. at the University of Pennsylvania in 1977. She worked under the supervision of Deborah Kemler at University of Pennsylvania, studying the structure of perceptual experience, with a focus on the visual system. In 1977, Smith joined Indiana University as faculty member in the universities new program in Developmental Psychology. She subsequently chaired the Psychological and Brain Science Department at the institution.

Smith's research interests include sensory-motor dynamics of attention and learning, word learning, and the development of visual object recognition in infancy and early childhood. Agencies supporting her work include the National Institutes of Health and the National Science Foundation. Smith has served as member of the Governing Board of the Cognitive Science Society.

== Research ==
Smith's research examines developmental processes, and mechanisms of change, in perceptual, motor, cognitive, and language development in infancy and early childhood. Her work emphasizes how myriad skills are dependent on one another. For instance, an infant's ability to sit is connected to their ability to reach for objects, which in turn is connected to new ways of manipulating and viewing objects, which is connected to increased attention to the object's shape and the words used to name it.

=== Dynamic Systems Theory ===
Together with Esther Thelen, Smith proposed a detailed theory of early perceptual, cognitive, and motor development based on dynamic systems. Dynamic systems theory is a mathematical approach to understanding developmental processes, including evolution and culture, with cumulative incremental changes leading to increases in behavioral complexity over time. All adaptations within the system are a product of the prior state of the organism in interaction with a changing environment, with accumulated effects often leading to qualitative changes in the system. According to this theory, development emerges from local environmental contingencies and internal dynamics of the system nested in different time scales. Smith and Thelen emphasized the role of exploration and selection in the self-organization of perceptual-action (sensorimotor) categories, and the cascading interactions between perception, action, and attention over time. This had a major impact on the field of psychology by introducing new ways of thinking about developmental processes.

=== Shape bias ===
Smith is known for her research with Barbara Landau, Susan Jones, and others on the shape bias. This term refers to children's tendency to extend usage of a newly introduced noun to other exemplars of the category on the basis of the shape of the object, rather than its color, texture, or material. Smith and her collaborators found that the shape bias emerges by age 3 years as a consequence of the child having acquired nouns that name categories of objects organized by shape. Their studies revealed how young children transition from classifying objects by overall similarities to using dimensional qualities, e.g. color, size, or shape alone. Such discoveries led Smith to develop a model of the effects of language on attention. Smith and her collaborators diagnosed the origins, consequences and functionality of the shape bias in supporting vocabulary development.

=== Eye-tracking studies ===
Eye-tracker technology allows a new and precise measure of the infant's perspective, and contributes to a better understanding of cognitive and visual development in infancy. Using head mounted eye-tracking, Smith and her colleagues identified changes in the infant's point of view that coincide with development in motor skills, such as the transition from sitting to crawling to walking, and linked changes in the infant's sensorimotor experience with their word learning. Viewing the world from the infant's point of view has increased understand of how everyday experiences contribute to learning.

== Books ==
- Golinkoff, R.M., Hirsh-Pasek, K., Bloom, L., Smith, L.B., Woodward, A., Akhtar, N., Tomasello, M., & Hollich, G. (2012). Becoming a word learner: A debate on lexical acquisition. Oxford University Press.
- Smith, L. B., & Thelen, E. E. (1993). A dynamic systems approach to development: Applications. The MIT Press.
- Thelen, E., & Smith, L. B. (1994). A dynamic systems approach to the development of cognition and action. The MIT Press.

== Representative publications ==
- Smith, L. B. (1989). A model of perceptual classification in children and adults. Psychological Review, 96(1), 125–144. https://doi.org/10.1037/0033-295X.96.1.125
- Smith L. B., & Gasser M. (2005). The development of embodied cognition: Six lessons from babies. Artificial Life, 11(1–2), 13–29. https://doi.org/10.1162/1064546053278973
- Smith, L. B., Jones, S. S., Landau, B., Gershkoff-Stowe, L., & Samuelson, L. (2002). Object name learning provides on-the-job training for attention. Psychological Science, 13(1), 13–19. https://doi.org/10.1111/1467-9280.00403
- Smith, L. B., & Thelen, E. (2003). Development as a dynamic system. Trends in Cognitive Sciences, 7(8), 343–348. https://doi.org/10.1016/S1364-6613(03)00156-6
- Smith, L. B., & Yu, C. (2008). Infants rapidly learn word-referent mappings via cross-situational statistics. Cognition, 106(3), 1558–1568. https://doi.org/10.1016/j.cognition.2007.06.010
- Thelen, E., Schöner, G., Scheier, C., & Smith, L. B. (2001). The dynamics of embodiment: A field theory of infant perseverative reaching. Behavioral and Brain Sciences, 24(1), 1–86. https://doi.org/10.1017/S0140525X01003910
- Thelen, E., & Smith, L. B. (2007). Dynamic systems theories. Handbook of child psychology. John Wiley & Sons, Inc. https://doi.org/10.1002/9780470147658.chpsy0106

== Interviews and talks ==
- Interview with Linda Smith for our 2017 GOLD Perinatal Online Conference
- Linda B. Smith "Connections in Psychological and Brain Sciences"
- Linda B. Smith "The Development of Visual Experience"
- Linda B. Smith "Why Self-Generated Learning May Be More Radical and Consequential Than First Appears"
- PsyTalks: Episode 1 - Movement and babies' learning development
- Episodes of Experience and Generative Intelligence | Linda B. Smith at AMLC 2022
