= Infant visual development =

Development of visual ability in human infants

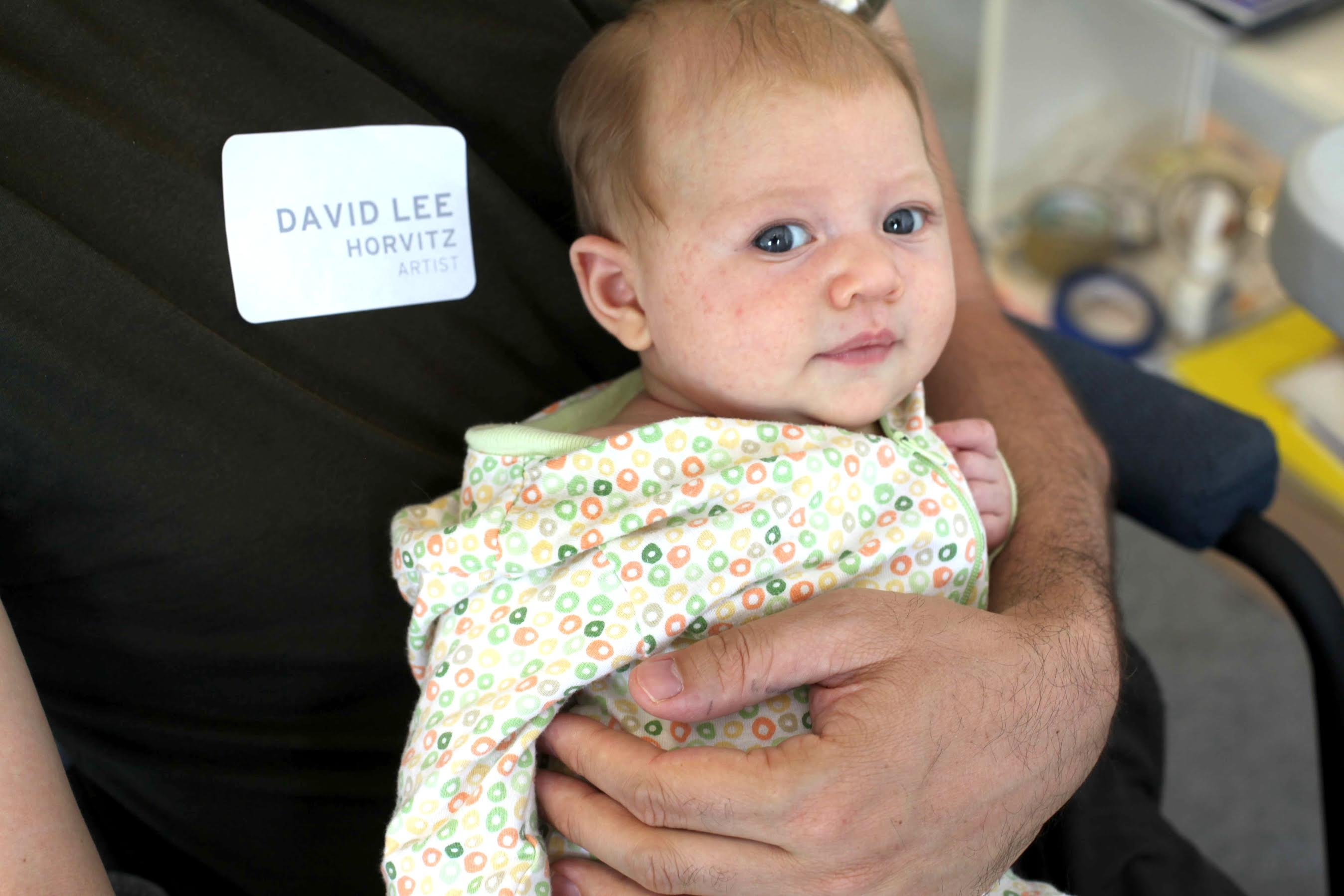
A seven-week-old human baby following a kinetic object.

Infant vision concerns the development of visual ability in human infants from birth through the first years of life. The aspects of human vision that develop following birth include visual acuity, tracking, color perception, depth perception, and object recognition.

Unlike many other sensory systems, the human visual system – components from the eye to neural circuits – develops largely after birth, especially in the first few years of life. At birth, visual structures are fully present yet immature in their potential. From the first moment of life, there are a few innate components of an infant's visual system. Newborns can detect changes in brightness, distinguish between stationary and kinetic objects, and follow kinetic objects in their visual fields. However, many of these areas are very poorly developed. With physical improvements such as increased distances between the cornea and retina, increased pupil dimensions, and strengthened cones and rods, an infant's visual ability improves drastically. The neuro-pathway and physical changes that underlie these improvements in vision remain a strong focus in research. Because of an infant's inability to verbally express their visual field, growing research in this field relies heavily on nonverbal cues, including an infant's perceived ability to detect patterns and visual changes. The major components of the visual system can be broken up into visual acuity, depth perception, color sensitivity, and light sensitivity.

By providing a better understanding of the visual system, future medical treatments for infant and pediatric ophthalmology can be established. By additionally creating a timeline on visual perception development in "normal" newborns and infants, research can shed some light on abnormalities that often arise and interfere with ideal sensory growth and change.

== Development ==
=== Acuity ===
Infants' eyes develop significantly after birth. The muscles of the eye such as ciliary muscles – become stronger after two months of age, allowing infants to focus on particular objects through contraction and relaxation. Their retinal images are also smaller compared to adults due to shorter distances from the retina to the cornea of the infants' eye. A newborn's pupil grows from approximately 2.2 mm to an adult length of 3.3 mm.

Visual acuity, the sharpness of the eye to fine detail, is a major component of a human's visual system. It requires not only the muscles of the eye – the muscles of orbit and the ciliary muscles – to be able to focus on a particular object through contraction and relaxation, but other parts of the retina such as the fovea to project a clear image on the retina. The muscles that initiate movement start to strengthen from birth to 2 months, at which point infants have control of their eye. However, images still appear unclear at two months due to other components of the visual system like the fovea and retina and the brain circuitry that are still in their developmental stages. This means that even though an infant is able to focus on a clear image on the retina, the fovea and other visual parts of the brain are too immature to transmit a clear image.

Visual acuity in newborns is very limited as well compared to adults – being 12 to 25 times worse than that of a normal adult. The distance from the cornea at the front of the infant's eye to the retina which is at the back of eye is 16–17 mm at birth, 20 to 21 mm at one year, and 23–25 mm in adolescence and adulthood. This results in smaller retinal images for infants.

The vision of infants under one month of age ranges from 6/240 to 6/60 (20/800 to 20/200). By two months, visual acuity improves to 6/45 (20/150). By four months, acuity improves by a factor of 2 – calculated to be 6/18 (20/60) vision. As the infant grows, the acuity reaches the healthy adult standard of 6/6 (20/20) at six months.

One major method used to measure visual acuity during infancy is by testing an infant's sensitivity to visual details such as a set of black strip lines in a pictorial image. Studies have shown that most one-week-old infants can discriminate a gray field from a fine black stripped field at a distance of one foot away. This means that most infants will look longer at patterned visual stimuli instead of a plain, pattern-less stimuli. Gradually, infants develop the ability to distinguish strips of lines that are closer together. Therefore, by measuring the width of the strips and their distance from an infant's eye, visual acuity can be estimated, with detection of finer strips indicating better acuity. When examining an infants preferred visual stimuli, it was found that one-month-old infants often gazed mostly at prominent, sharp features of an object – whether it is a strong defined curve or an edge. Beginning at two months old, infants begin to direct their saccades to the interior of the object, but still focusing on strong features. Additionally, infants starting from one month of age have been found to prefer visual stimuli that are in motion rather than stationary.

==== Faces ====
Newborns are exceptionally capable of facial discrimination and recognition shortly after birth. Therefore, it is not surprising that infants develop strong facial recognition of their mother. Studies have shown that newborns have a preference for their mothers' faces two weeks after birth. At this stage, infants would focus their visual attention on pictures of their own mother for a longer period than a picture of complete strangers. Studies have shown that infants even as early as four days old look longer at their mothers' face than at those of strangers only when the mother is not wearing a head scarf. This may suggest that hairline and outer perimeter of the face play an integral part in the newborn's face recognition. According to Maurer and Salapateck, a one-month-old baby scans the outer contour of the face, with strong focus on the eyes, while a two-month-old scans more broadly and focuses on the features of the face, including the eyes and mouth.

When comparing facial features across species, it was found that infants of six months were better at distinguishing facial information of both humans and monkeys than older infants and adults. They found that both nine-month-olds and adults could discriminate between pictures of human faces; however, neither infants nor adults had the same capabilities when it came to pictures of monkeys. On the other hand, six-month-old infants were able to discriminate both facial features on human faces and on monkey faces. This suggests that there is a narrowing in face processing, as a result of neural network changes in early cognition. Another explanation is that infants likely have no experience with monkey faces and relatively little experience with human faces. This may result in a more broadly tuned face recognition system and, in turn, an advantage in recognizing facial identity in general (i.e., regardless of species). In contrast, healthy adults due to their interaction with people on a frequent basis have fine tuned their sensitivity to facial information of humans – which has led to cortical specialization.

=== Depth perception ===
To perceive depth, infants as well as adults rely on several signals such as distances and kinetics. For instance, the fact that objects closer to the observer fill more space in our visual field than farther objects provides some cues into depth perception for infants. Evidence has shown that newborns' eyes do not work in the same fashion as older children or adults – mainly due to poor coordination of the eyes. Newborn's eyes move in the same direction only about half of the time. The strength of eye muscle control is positively correlated to achieve depth perception. Human eyes are formed in such a way that each eye reflects a stimulus at a slightly different angle thereby producing two images that are processed in the brain. These images provide the essential visual information regarding 3D features of the external world. Therefore, an infant's ability to control their eye movement and converge on one object is critical for developing depth perception.

One of the important discoveries of infant depth perception is thanks to researchers Eleanor J. Gibson and R.D. Walk. Gibson and Walk developed an apparatus called the visual cliff that could be used to investigate visual depth perception in infants. In short, infants were placed on a centerboard to one side which contained an illusory steep drop ("deep side") and another which contained a platform of the centerboard ("shallow side"). In reality, both sides, covered in glass, was safe for infants to trek. From their experiment, Gibson and Walk found that a majority of infants ranging from 6 to 14 months-old would not cross from the shallow side to the deep side due to their innate sense of fear to heights. From this experiment, Gibson and Walk concluded that by six months an infant has developed a sense of depth. However, this experiment was limited to infants that could independently crawl or walk. To overcome the limitations of testing non-locomotive infants, Campos and his colleges devised an experiment that was dependent on heart rate reactions of infants when placed in environments that reflected different depth scenarios. Campos and his colleagues placed six week-old infants on the "deep end" of the visual cliff, the six week-old infants' heart rate decreased and a sense of fascination was seen in the infants. However, when seven month-old infants were lowered down on the same "deep end" illusion, their heart rates accelerated rapidly and they started to whimper. Gibson and Walk concluded that infants had developed a sense of visual depth prior to beginning locomotion. Therefore, it could be concluded that sometime at the spark of crawling around 4–5 months, depth perception begins to strongly present itself.

==== Cues ====
From an infant's standpoint, depth perception can be inferred using three means: binocular, static, and kinetic cues. As mentioned previous, humans are binocular and each eye views the external world with a different angle – providing essential information into depth. The convergence of each eye on a particular object and the stereopsis, also known as the retinal disparity among two objects, provides some information for infants older than ten weeks. With binocular vision development, infants between four and five months also develop a sense of size and shape constancy objects, regardless of the objects location and orientation in space. From static cues based upon monocular vision, infants older of five month of age have the ability to predict depth perception from pictorial position of objects. In other words, edges of closer objects overlap objects in the distance. Lastly, kinetic cues are another factor in depth perception for humans, especially young infants. Infants ranging from three to five months are able to move when an object approaches them in the intent to hit them – implying that infants have depth perception.

=== Color vision ===
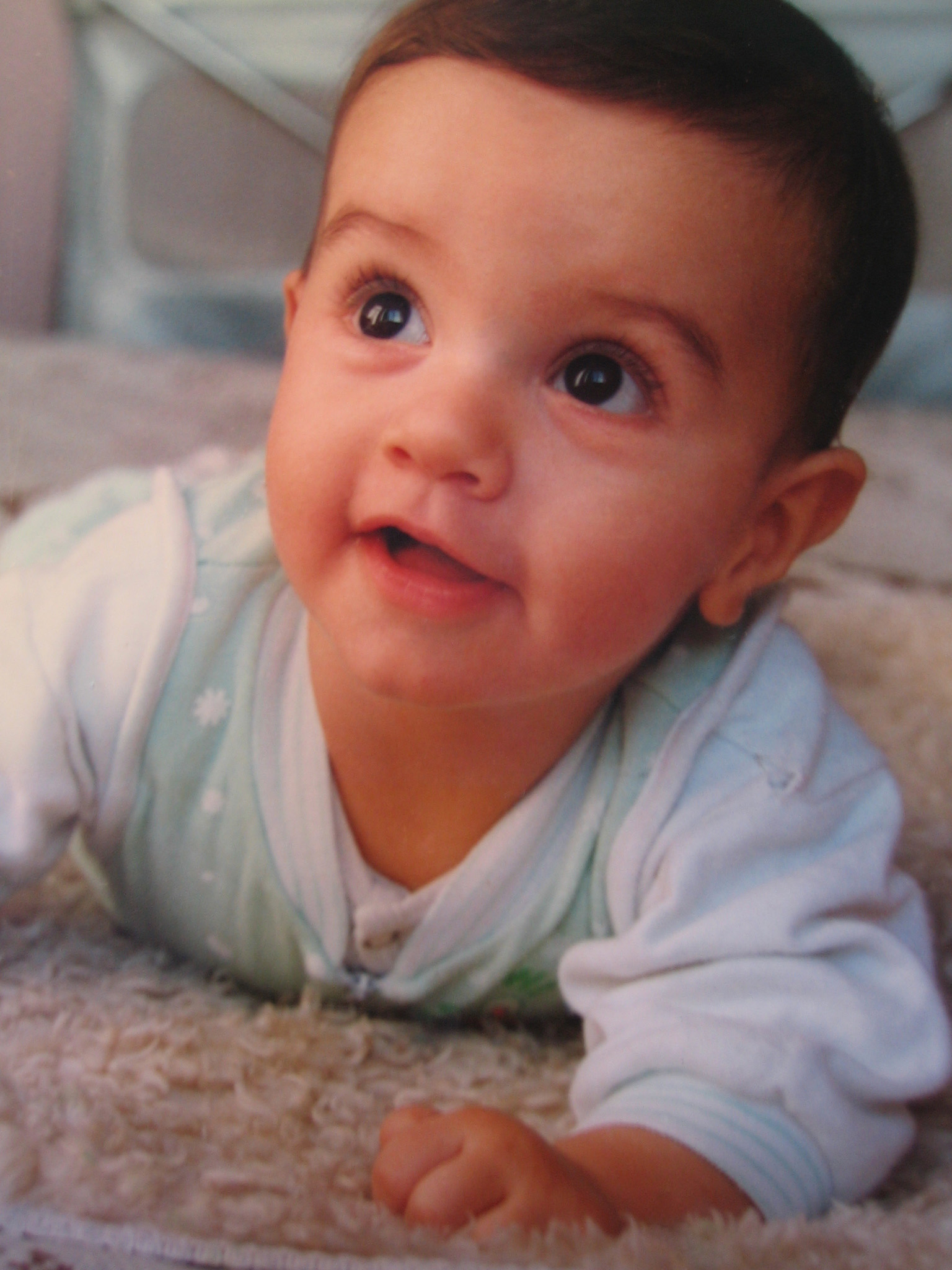
Infants are often attracted to shiny bright objects with strong contrast and bold colors.

Color vision improves steadily over the first year of life for humans due to strengthening of the cones of the eyes. Like adults, infant color vision derives from three cone cell types with long-, mid- and short-wavelength opsins that are sensitive to different parts of the visible range. The signals from these cones recombine in the precortical visual opponent process to form a luminance channel and two chromatic channels (red-green and blue-yellow) that comprise an individual's trichromatic color gamut. The number of colors an infant can see is proportional to the size of their gamut, which is proportional to the dynamic range of each of the three channels. These dynamic ranges increase with age, leading to the development of color vision.

It is generally accepted across all current research that infants prefer high contrast and bold colors at their earlier stages of infancy, rather than saturated colors. One study found that newborn infants looked longer at checkered patterns of white and colored stimuli (including red, green, yellow) than they did at a uniform white color. However, infants failed to discriminate blue from white checkered patterns. Another study – recording the fixation time of infants to blue, green, yellow, red, and gray at two difference luminance levels – found that infants and adults differed in their color preference. Newborns and one-month-old infants did not show any preference among the colored stimuli, while three-month-old infants preferred the longer wavelength (red and yellow) stimuli to the short-wavelength (blue and green) stimuli, and adults had the opposite. However, both adults and infants preferred colored stimuli over non-colored stimuli. This study suggested that infants had a general preference for colored stimuli over non-colored stimuli at birth, though infants were not able to distinguish the different colored stimuli prior to the age of three months.

Research into the development of color vision using infant female Japanese macaques indicates that color experience is critical for normal vision development. Infant monkeys were placed in a room with monochromatic lighting limiting their access to a normal spectrum of colors for a one-month period. After a one-year period, the monkey's ability to distinguish colors was poorer than that of normal monkey exposed to a full spectrum of colors. Although this result directly pertains to infant monkeys and not humans, they strongly suggest that visual experience with color is critical for proper, healthy vision development in humans as well.

=== Light sensitivity ===
The threshold for light sensitivity is much higher in infants compared to adults. From birth, the pupils of an infant remain constricted to limit the amount of entering light. In regards to pupil dimensions, newborns' pupils grow from approximately 2.2 mm to an adult length of 3.3 mm. A one-month-old infant can detect a light threshold only when it is approximately 50 times greater than that of an adult. By two months, the threshold decreases measurably to about ten times greater than that of an adult. The increase in sensitivity is the result of lengthening of the photoreceptors and further development of the retina. Therefore, postnatal maturation of the retinal structures has led to strong light adaptations for infants.

== Vision abnormalities in infants ==
Vision problems in infants are both common and easily treatable if addressed early by an ophthalmologist.

=== Critical warning signs ===
- Excessive tearing
- Red or encrusted eyelids
- White pupils
- Extreme sensitivity to bright light
- Constant eye turning

=== Vision problems ===
- Strabismus
- Nystagmus
- Amblyopia
- Photophobia
- Tumor in the eye
- Cataract

== See also ==
- Eye exam
- Orthoptist
- Pediatric ophthalmology
- Retinopathy of prematurity
