= Heckscher =

Heckscher is a surname. Notable people with the surname include:

- August Heckscher (1848–1941), German American philanthropist
- Charles Heckscher, American academic and management theorist
- Eli Heckscher (1879–1952), Swedish economist
- Ferdinand Heckscher (1806–1891), German actor
- Gunnar Heckscher (1909–1987), Swedish politician and son of Eli Heckscher
- Gustave Maurice Heckscher (1884–1967), American pioneer aviator
- Morrison Heckscher (born 1940), American art historian and curator
- Sten Heckscher, Swedish politician and grandson of Eli Heckscher
- William S. Heckscher (1904–1999), German art historian

== Locations ==
- The Heckscher Foundation for Children
- Heckscher State Parkway in western Town of Islip, Suffolk County, New York
- Heckscher State Park in East Islip, New York
- Heckscher Park (Huntington, New York), a local park on the National Register of Historic Places in Huntington, New York
- Heckscher Museum of Art within the aforementioned park in Huntington, New York
- Heckscher Playground in New York, New York

== See also ==
- Heckscher–Ohlin theorem
- Heckscher–Ohlin model
- Hechsher
