= Gustave Maurice Heckscher =

American real estate developer (1884–1967)

- Born: May 15, 1884; Philadelphia, Pennsylvania, U.S.
- Died: June 11, 1967 (aged 83); Palm Beach, Florida
- Education: Yale University
- Spouses: Frances Louise Vanderhoef (m. 1907; div. 1927) Luella Gear (m. 1927; div. 1933) Dorothy Eleanor Bennett (m. 1934; div. 1936)
- Children: 4, including August
- Parent(s): August Heckscher; Anna Atkins Heckscher
- Relatives: Johann Gustav Heckscher (grandfather); Myron Arms Hofer (grandson)

Gustave Maurice Heckscher (May 15, 1884 – June 11, 1967), was a pioneer seaplane aviator, and later a real estate developer in California.

== Early life ==
Heckscher was born on May 15, 1884, in Philadelphia. He was the son of Anna (née Atkins) Heckscher (1859–1924) and the German-born August Heckscher (1848–1941), who made money in zinc mining with the New Jersey Zinc Company before entering the New York real estate business. His younger sister, Antoinette Heckscher, married the British aristocrat and architect, Capt. Oliver Sylvain Baliol Brett, 3rd Viscount Esher, a son of Reginald Brett, 2nd Viscount Esher. After the death of his mother in 1924, the father remarried to Virginia Henry Curtiss, the widow of Edwin Burr Curtiss, who was 27 years younger than his father. His father's second wife inherited all of his father's real estate and $10,000.

His paternal grandparents were Johann Gustav Heckscher, a German politician who was the Minister of Justice in the provisional German government headed by Archduke John of Austria, and Marie Antoinette (née Brautigan) Heckscher.

He graduated from Yale in 1906 and was a classmate and associate of Pebble Beach developer Samuel Finley Brown Morse.

== Career ==
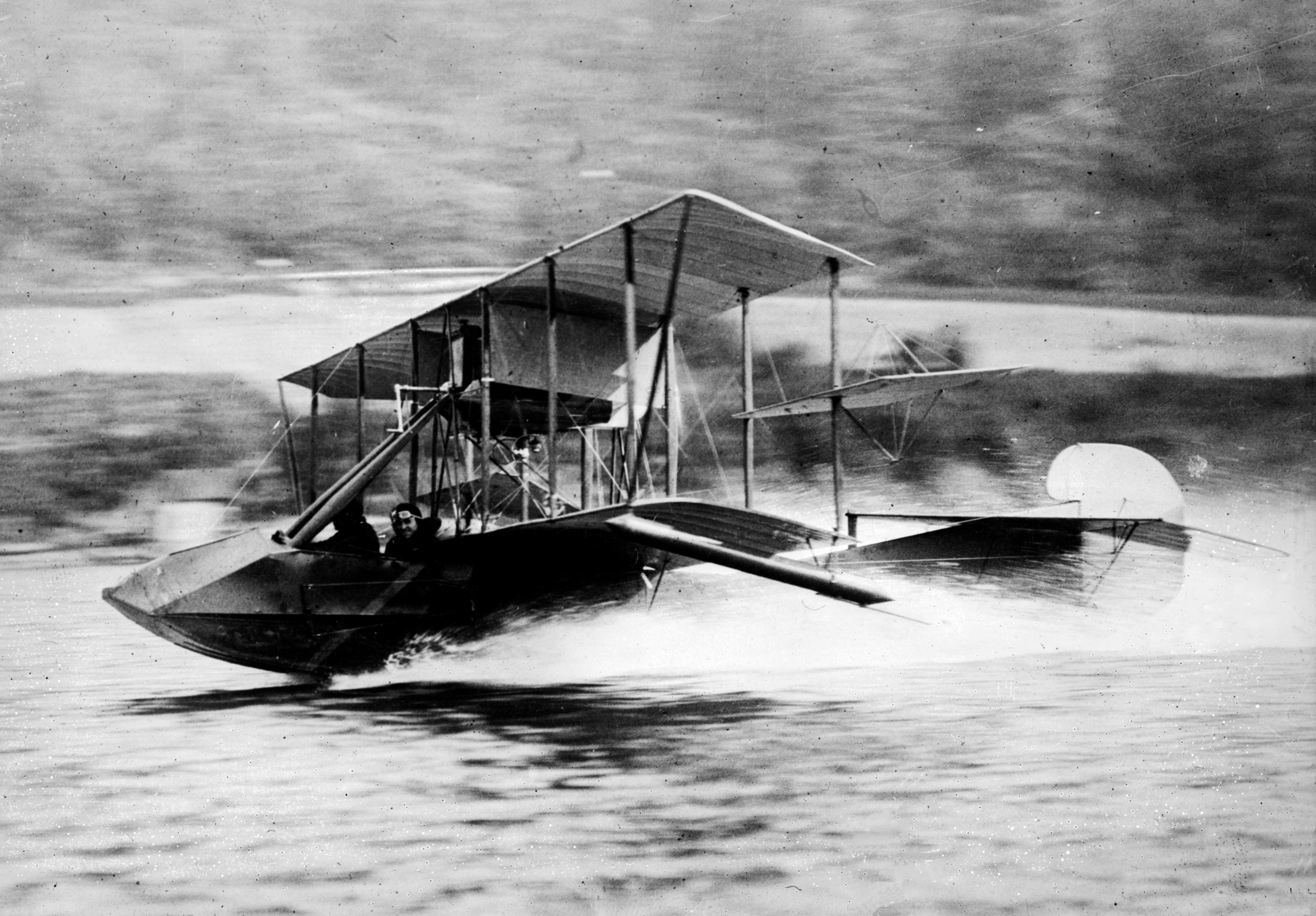
Gustave Maurice Heckscher in his Curtiss seaplane at 60 miles per hour

G. M. Heckscher flew a Glenn Curtiss aircraft in the 1913 Great Lakes Reliability Cruise, at which time he was listed as living in New York.

=== Real estate ===
Like his father, Heckscher was involved in real estate deals, especially in California. He bought the San Mateo Polo Club, the Hope Ranch and sat on the initial board of the Hotel Del Monte after the Del Monte Properties company formed in 1919. Heckscher, a friend of Winston Guest, followed him to Palm Beach, where also backed the erection of the $7,000,000 Hotel Alba after the Duke of Alba (later known as the Palm Beach Biltmore), which failed.

In October 1925, he headed a syndicate which offered $7,100,000 for the Vanderbilt mansion (the largest private residence ever built in New York City) on the west side of Fifth Avenue and 58th Streets. It was later reported that the syndicate relinquished its option and forfeited a deposit of $500,000.

Heckscher declared bankruptcy in 1927 when the Equitable Trust Company tried to collect a judgment for $101,320 and failed. It was later revealed that he was indebted at $4,992,000 and only had assets totaling $1,685,836. President of the Board of Alderman, Joseph V. McKee (later mayor of New York City) was appointed Receiver over his property.

== Personal life ==
On February 6, 1907, he married Frances Louise Vanderhoef. Frances was a daughter of Harmon B. Vanderhoef, and a sister of investment banker Francis B. Vanderhoef. In 1909, they bought the Morse Lodge house in Old Westbury, New York, and renamed it Upland House. Before their divorce in 1927, they were the parents of two sons and two daughters:

- Frances Louise Vanderhoef Heckscher (1908-1978), who married Philip Hofer (1898–1984) in 1930. They were the parents of Myron Arms Hofer.
- Nancy Heckscher (1911–2007), who married Theodore Hazeltine Price Jr. (1905–1969).
- August Heckscher II (1913–1997), who married Claude Chevreux, and became the Parks Commissioner of New York City.
- Gustave Maurice Heckscher Jr. (d. 1944), who died of spinal meningitis at Camp San Luis Obispo in California.

After their divorce in May 1927, his ex-wife remarried to John M. P. Thatcher in 1931.

Maurice remarried to actress Luella Gear, the former wife of Byron Chandler (who was known as "the millionaire kid" on Broadway), on September 28, 1927, although, in 1933, they also divorced. In 1934, he married for a third time to movie actress, Dorothy Eleanor Bennett of London, at the Lutheran Church in Ramsey, New Jersey. Dorothy was the daughter of Robert Bennett, an English ship magnate. They also divorced in 1936.

Heckscher, who was then living at 160 Royal Palm Way in Palm Beach died on June 11, 1967.
