= Charles Heckscher =

- Born: October 2, 1949 (age 76)
- Education: Harvard University
- Employer(s): Communications Workers of America; Harvard University; Rutgers University
- Parent(s): August Heckscher II; Claude Chevreux
- Relatives: Gustave Maurice Heckscher (grandfather)

Charles Heckscher (born October 2, 1949) is a professor in the Department of Labor Studies and Employment at Rutgers University, and director of the Center for Workplace Transformation at Rutgers.

== Early life ==
Heckscher was born October 2, 1949. He is the son of August Heckscher II, the former Parks Commissioner of New York City, and Claude (née Chevreux) Heckscher. He is also the grandson of Gustave Maurice Heckscher, a pioneer aviator with seaplanes and real estate developer, and the great-grandson of August Heckscher, a German-born American capitalist and philanthropist.

Heckscher received his B.A. (1971), M.A. in teaching (1971), M.A. (1974), and Ph.D. (1981), all from Harvard University.

== Career ==
After working as a research economist for the Communications Workers of America, he took a faculty position at Harvard in 1986, leaving in 1992 to join Rutgers, where he was department chair from 1992 to 1998.

His research concerns collaborative work, organizational change, and the future of organized labor.

Heckscher writes op-ed pieces, as well as non-fiction books, including The New Unionism: Employee Involvement in the Changing Corporation and Trust in a Complex World: Enriching Community, published in 2015, which received the 2016 George R. Terry Book Award.
