= Myron Arms Hofer =

American psychiatrist and researcher (1931–2026)

Myron Arms Hofer (December 20, 1931 – March 29, 2026) was an American psychiatrist and research scientist, and Sackler Institute Professor Emeritus in the Department of Psychiatry at Columbia University College of Physicians & Surgeons. He was known for his research on basic developmental processes at work within the mother-infant relationship. Using animal models, he found unexpected neurobiological and behavioral regulatory processes within the observable interactions of the infant rat and its mother. Through an experimental analysis of these sensorimotor, thermal and nutrient-based processes, he has contributed to our understanding of the impact of early maternal separation, the origins of the attachment system, and the shaping of later development by variations in how mothers and infants interact.

== Early life ==
Born in New York City, Hofer’s family moved to Cambridge, Massachusetts in 1939 when his father, Philip Hofer, became curator of the Department of Printing and Graphic Arts at Harvard's newly built Houghton Library. Hofer went to school and college in the Boston area and married in 1954. His wife, Lynne, co-founded the Young Filmaker's Foundation and later became a psychoanalyst. The Hofers have three children and eight grandchildren.

== Career path ==
Hofer graduated from Harvard College and Harvard Medical School (MD 1958), did his residency training in Medicine at Massachusetts General Hospital and in Psychiatry at New York State Psychiatric Institute, followed by post-doctoral research at the National Institute of Mental Health (NIMH) and the American Museum of Natural History, before joining the department of psychiatry at Albert Einstein College of Medicine in 1966, where he began his animal model research. In 1984, Hofer moved with his research group to the Department of Psychiatry at Columbia University College of Physicians and Surgeons, and in 2000 was appointed Director of the Sackler Institute for Developmental Psychobiology.

== Research and related activities ==
Following his early clinical research as member of the NIMH group studying threatened loss and bereavement in the parents of children with leukemia, Hofer turned to animal model research to study the biological basis for the impact of separation and loss in a typical laboratory mammal. He described widespread bio-behavioral effects in infant rats during the hours after separation from their mothers, and defined the mechanisms for these effects as withdrawal (i.e. loss) of numerous unexpected regulators of infant physiology and behavior that he found within the sensorimotor, thermal and nutrient-based interactions between mothers and their infants. The discovery of these “hidden regulators” added a new dimension to the concept of early attachment. Hofer and his colleagues went on to study infant behaviors that initiate and maintain proximity to the mother and mediate complex interactions such as nursing, and sleep-wake state regulation, and showed that altering the patterns and types of interactions between mothers and infants caused short and long-term changes in offspring development, and biological vulnerability, extending into adulthood, even into the next generation. These studies provided clues and ideas that have guided subsequent research on human mother-infant attachment behaviors, and clinical research and thinking about human bereavement. Subsequent research led to an animal model for studying the development of anxiety, extending from childhood separation sensitivity to adult anxiety disorder. Hofer and colleagues explored how the ultrasonic isolation calling response of the infant rat is regulated at the sensory, behavioral and neurochemical levels. He then used selective breeding for high and for low levels of the infant trait, as a model for studying evolution and how it can interact with developmental processes in the creation of differences in adult temperament. Hofer’s research and its implications have been periodically reported in the Science section of the N.Y. Times. He has served on the National Academy of Medicine committee on the management of the consequences of bereavement. and later on the national advisory committee for development of the Healthy Steps for Young Children Program that has been effective in applying new treatment principles in Pediatrics for mothers and young children. He was asked to write the entry on "Development, psychobiology" for the “Encyclopedia of Human Biology”, edited by Renato Dulbecco, and has recently contributed invited chapters on his research and thinking about development, for Handbooks in the fields of attachment, developmental and cognitive neuroscience, mammalian vocalization and anxiety disorders.

== Awards and honors ==
Hofer was elected president of the International Society for Developmental Psychobiology, and the American Psychosomatic Society, and to membership in the Academy of Behavioral Medicine Research. His awards include the Thomas William Salmon Memorial Lectures, the Senior Investigator Award of the International Society for Developmental Psychobiology, and the Paul Hoch Award, presented at the 2012 meeting of the American Psychopathological Association. An issue of Developmental Psychobiology (journal), was published in 2005 in recognition of his contributions to the field.

== Death ==
Hofer died on March 29, 2026, at the age of 94.

== Selected publications ==
- Hofer, M (1981) The Roots of Human Behavior. WH Freeman, San Francisco
- Skolnick, NJ, Ackerman, SH, Hofer, MA and Weiner, H (1980) Vertical transmission of acquired ulcer susceptibility in the rat. Science 208: 1161–1163.
- Hofer, MA (1984) Relationships as regulators: A psychobiological perspective on bereavement. Psychosom. Med. 46: 183–197
- Brake, SC, Shair, HN and Hofer, MA (1988) Exploiting the Nursing Niche: Infant's sucking and feeding behavior in the context of the mother-infant interaction. Blass, E (Ed.) Developmental Psychobiology and Behavioral Ecology, Vol. 9 Plenum Publishing Corp., New York pp. 347–388
- Hofer, MA (1994) Early relationships as regulators of infant physiology and behavior. Acta Pediatrica Suppl. 397: 9–18
- Hofer, MA (1996) Multiple regulators of ultrasonic vocalization in the infant rat. Psychoneuroendocrinology 21(2): 203–217
- Hofer MA (2002) Unexplained infant crying: an evolutionary perspective. Acta Paediatrica 91: 491–496
- Hofer, MA (2002) The Riddle of Development. In Lewkowicz, DJ and Lickliter, R (Eds.) Conceptions of Development, Psychology Press: Philadelphia pp. 5–29
- Brunelli, SA, Hofer, MA (2007) Selective breeding for infant rat separation-induced ultrasonic vocalizations: Developmental precursors of passive and active coping styles. Behavioural Brain Research 182: 193–207
- Hofer, MA (2009) Developmental Neuroscience. In Berntson, GG and Cacioppo, JT (Eds.), Handbook of Neuroscience for the Behavioral Sciences Vol 1 Wiley & Sons, New York pp. 12–31
