= Palm Beach Biltmore =

Hotel in Florida, United States

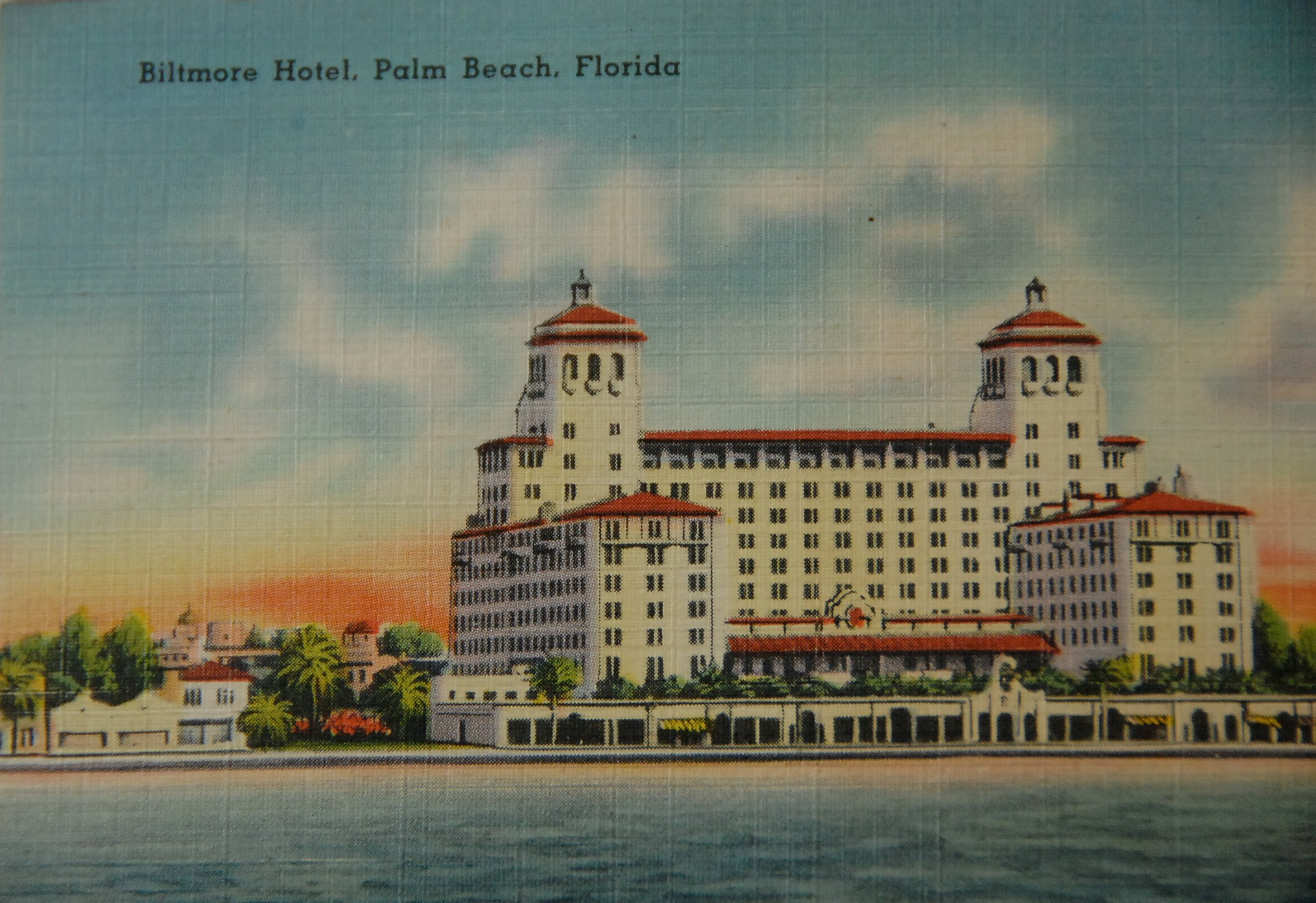
- A 1962 postcard featuring the Biltmore Hotel
- Interactive map of the Palm Beach Biltmore area
- Former names: Alba Hotel

General information
- Architectural style: Italian Renaissance Revival and Mission Revival
- Location: 150 Bradley Place; Palm Beach, Florida, U.S.
- Coordinates: 26°43′13″N 80°2′30″W
- Opened: February 1926
- Cost: $7 million

Technical details
- Floor count: 11

Other information
- Number of rooms: 128

The Palm Beach Biltmore is a historic condominium in Palm Beach, Florida, United States. It is located at 150 Bradley Place. Constructed by the Southern Florida Realty Company under the ownership of Gustave Maurice Heckscher at a cost of $7 million (1926 USD), the building originally opened in February 1926 as the Alba Hotel, which consisted of 12 floors and 550 rooms. Ownership changed several times from the 1920s to the 1970s, going into receivership in May 1926, and then becoming part of the Ambassador Hotel system by 1928, being renamed the Ambassador Hotel in 1929. After buying the property in 1934, Henry Latham Doherty switched the name to the Biltmore Hotel, as he also owned the Miami Biltmore Hotel.

Between 1942 and 1945, the hotel served as the training grounds for the United States Coast Guard Women's Reserve, also known as SPARS, and a United States Naval hospital due to World War II. After Conrad Hilton bought the Biltmore Hotel in 1946, a few other changes in ownership occurred from the 1940s to the 1970s. With the exception of the World War II era, the Biltmore Hotel opened each winter season until 1969–70, when the owners foreclosed on the property. In October 1977, Stanley Harte bought the hotel from John D. MacArthur and converted the interior of the main building into 128 condominium units; the first tenant moved in during October 1980. The town of Palm Beach designated the Biltmore Condominium main building as a historic landmark in 1991. Several notable individuals stayed on the property both during its hotel era and as a condominium.

== History ==
From 1902 to 1925, the original Palm Beach Hotel occupied the site of the present-day Palm Beach Biltmore. Embers from a fire started at The Breakers on March 18, 1925, landed on the 400-room hotel, causing the building to rapidly burn down. Although the owner, Sidney Maddock, declined to rebuild and moved away, another structure called the Palm Beach Hotel was constructed along the north side of Sunrise Avenue and opened in January 1926. A few months after the fire, the site of the old Palm Beach Hotel was cleared out and prepared for a new building. In July 1925, it was announced that Gustave Maurice Heckscher and his father, August, would construct a $7 million hotel, to be named the "Alba Hotel" in honor of Jacobo Fitz-James Stuart, 17th Duke of Alba, and that the duo had obtained a $1.2 million mortgage loan. Architectural firm Allen & De Young designed the building, while Pedro Murguinza designed the gardens and furnishings. The Alba Hotel was scheduled to be opened on January 1, 1926. Approximately 1,400 people "have been working day and night to complete it" between June 15 and February 1926, according to The New York Times.

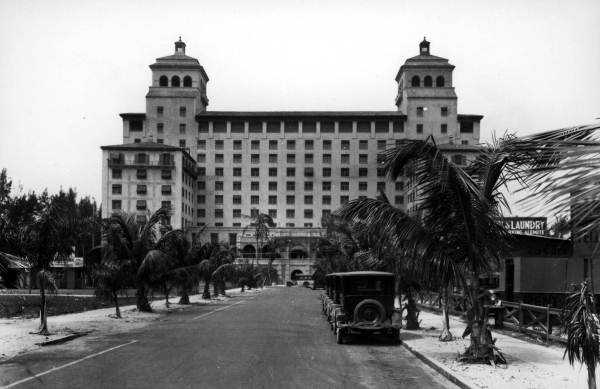
The Alba Hotel in the 1920s

The Alba Hotel opened on February 1, 1926, with the formal opening event held on February 17, which was attended by almost 1,000 people, including Irving Caesar, James H. R. Cromwell, Anita Loos, Alexander Moore, Ida Tarbell, and the wives of Paris Singer and Edward T. Stotesbury. During the hotel's first season, notable guests were the Mastbaum and Annenberg families, with Enid, Evelyn, and Janet later buying winter homes in Palm Beach. However, the hotel went into bankruptcy by May, with American National Bank and Trust Company vice president J. Warren Smith being named as the receiver by judge William Irwin Grubb. The hotel reopened in January 1927 for the winter season, which saw the arrival of Irving Berlin, W. C. Fields, George Gershwin, Arthur Hammerstein, Jimmy Walker, and Adolph Zukor. About eight months later, the Alba Hotel was sold by its trustees at an auction for about $4.66 million to a New York City hotelier. (Note: Sources differ on whether the New York City hotelier's name was A. M. Moore or A. M. Woore.)

By 1928, the building became part of the Ambassador Hotel system, before being renamed the Ambassador in May 1929. Additionally, the Ambassador Hotel system purchased property owned by J. Leonard Replogle in 1928 and transformed it into bathing beach and clubhouse. During the 1928 Okeechobee hurricane in September, some roof tiles blew away, causing water damage after rain leaked inside. About a month following the storm, the Alba Hotel was approved for a rebuilding permit for repair work projects costing about $125,000. Notably, Harry Warner and Zukor stayed at the Alba Hotel during the 1929 winter season. Nina Koshetz and Howard Lanin's orchestra both performed at the hotel's ballroom two years later. After buying the property in 1934, Henry Latham Doherty renamed it the Biltmore Hotel, as he owned another building with the same name in Coral Gables.

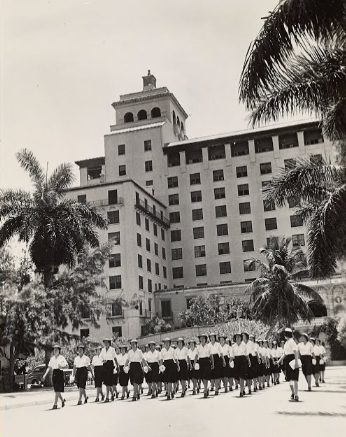
SPARS training in front of the Biltmore Hotel c. 1943

In November 1942, Congress approved and President Franklin D. Roosevelt signed into law an amended version of the Coast Guard Auxiliary and Reserve Act of 1941 for the purpose of sending more men overseas by creating a Women's Reserve of the United States Coast Guard (USCG), also known as SPARS. After realizing the need to establish a training facility for SPARS, USCG announced in May 1943 that they intended to open a base at the Biltmore Hotel. Robin D. Thompson of the USCG noted that in preparation for the opening of the SPARS facility in June, "Walls were knocked out, partitions were built, rich decorations were removed and ... The former Pink Palace had changed to Coast Guard blue." The Biltmore Hotel also included schools for bakers, cooks, storekeepers, and yeoman. Comedian and USCG seaman first class Sid Caesar, Gower Champion, Howard Dietz, Vernon Duke, Victor Mature, and others arrived at the facility to produce a revue called "Tars and Spars", leading to the creation of a film of the same name. More than 7,000 women trained there during the 18 months that the SPARS operated at the Biltmore Hotel. Thereafter, the SPARS relocated to Manhattan Beach, New York. In 1945, the hotel became a United States Naval Special Hospital, treating about 1,400 soldiers through the end of World War II.

A jury at a federal court awarded the owners of the Biltmore Hotel and Sun and Surf Club $229,000 in December 1945 as compensation for their usage as facilities of the United States Armed Forces. A. M. Sonnabend of the Sonesta International Hotels had bought the Biltmore Hotel in 1944 from George MacDonald. In 1946, Conrad Hilton of the Hilton Hotels chain purchased the Biltmore Hotel for $1.75 million, which included 537 rooms at the time. The hotel returned to civilian functions by the end of the year, when the Investment Bankers Associated of America hosted its annual convention, with 900 guests expected and scheduled speakers such as United States Securities and Exchange Commission chairman James J. Caffrey and International Bank for Reconstruction and Development executive director Emilio G. Collado.

Less than three years after Hilton purchased the Biltmore Hotel, he sold it for about $2 million to the West India Fruit and Steamship Company in 1949. The West India Fruit and Steamship Company, under the leadership of Daniel E. Taylor, spent more than $1 million to refurbish and remodel the resort. Not long after the Cuban Revolution of 1959, Francisco Batista, brother of ousted President Fulgencio Batista, arrived at the Biltmore Hotel and stated "We'll be back after the trouble is over." Fulgencio Batista's wife, Marta, also stayed there. Many other notable guests stayed at the hotel at its height, including Tallulah Bankhead, Taylor Caldwell, members of the du Pont family, Peter Duchin, Gracie Fields, Judy Garland, Rube Goldberg, Beatrice Lillie, General Douglas MacArthur, John D. MacArthur, Dorothy Parker, Mary Pickford, Babe Ruth, and Ed Sullivan, while Winthrop and Bobo Rockefeller were married there.

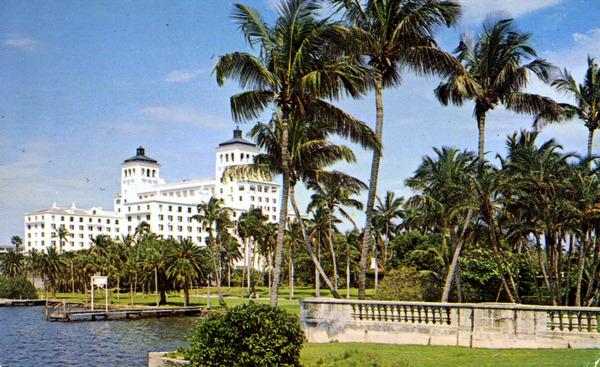
The Palm Beach Biltmore Hotel c. 1970

In 1959, the Hotel Corporation of America purchased the Biltmore Hotel for $3.5 million from West India Fruit and Steamship Company. At the time, the Associated Press noted that in addition to 537 rooms, the resort contained "55 suites, a private yacht basin, terrace dining and dancing, swimming pool, and private beach." The R. H. Weissberg Corporation bought the property in 1962 for $4.3 million. However, in December 1967, the corporation declared bankruptcy, with a federal court in Chicago allowing Lord Baltimore, Inc. to take over the hotel via a trusteeship. With the exception of the World War II era, the Biltmore Hotel opened each winter season until 1969–70, when the owners foreclosed on the property.

Palm Beach County Circuit Court Judge Joseph S. Metzger ordered the Biltmore Hotel to be sold in March 1970. An auction held at the Palm Beach County Courthouse that month led to the hotel being purchased for $1.5 million, though the buyer was not confirmed to be John D. MacArthur until December. The hotel then remained vacant for several years, in part because the town of Palm Beach declared it "unsafe and in a deteriorated condition." John D. MacArthur sold the property to real estate developer Charles C. Barton in September 1973 for $5 million. After Barton suggested converting the hotel into a condominium, MacArthur nullified the sale. However, Stanley Harte then purchased the hotel in 1977 for $5.34 million and also announced his intention to repurpose the building as a condominium, planning to transform 550 hotel rooms into 128 condominium units at an expected cost of $11 million.

The first tenants moved in in October 1980, while about 25 people lived there by mid-December. Condo unit prices then ranged from $200,000 to $750,000. Some condo owners filed a lawsuit against Harte and The Lawrence Group Chartered Architects and Planners, with The Palm Beach Post reporting that claimants alleged the building had "leaky walls and terraces... problems with structural steel reinforcements, heating and airconditioning in common areas and substandard fireproofing." A jury awarded the claimants $950,000 in December 1984 after failing to substantiate any problems other than leakage, which had already been fixed. On June 11, 1991, the town of Palm Beach designated the Biltmore Condominium main building as a historic landmark.

== Structure ==
Located at 150 Bradley Place in Palm Beach, Florida, the Palm Beach Biltmore is considered to be of the Italian Renaissance Revival-style architecture by the town's historic sites survey, while The New York Times described the building as being "of mission Spanish style". Upon opening as a hotel in 1926 and when Stanley Harte purchased the property in 1977, the Biltmore had 550 rooms across 5 floors, although news reports in 1946 and 1959 stated that it contained 537 rooms. Currently, the main building is divided into a central section and two wings, with the former having 11 floors and latter each having 7 floors. Overall, there are 128 condominium units. The complex also contains saunas, an exercise room, tennis courts, a boat dock, and a swimming pool, while another swimming pool owned by the Palm Beach Biltmore is located inside a clubhouse at the east end of Sunset Avenue. An approximately 27,000 sq ft (2,500 m^{2}) concrete deck surrounds the building, which Sika AG renovated between 2012 and 2014.

== Notable condo owners ==
- S. Daniel Abraham, businessman, founder of SlimFast
- John D. Idol, chairman and CEO of Capri Holdings
- Pari-Sima Pahlavi, wife of Abdul Reza Pahlavi, who was the half-brother of Iranian Shah Mohammad Reza Pahlavi
- Paul Schimmel, award-winning biochemist and molecular medicine specialist
