= Jee Hyun Kim =

Australian behavioral neuroscientist

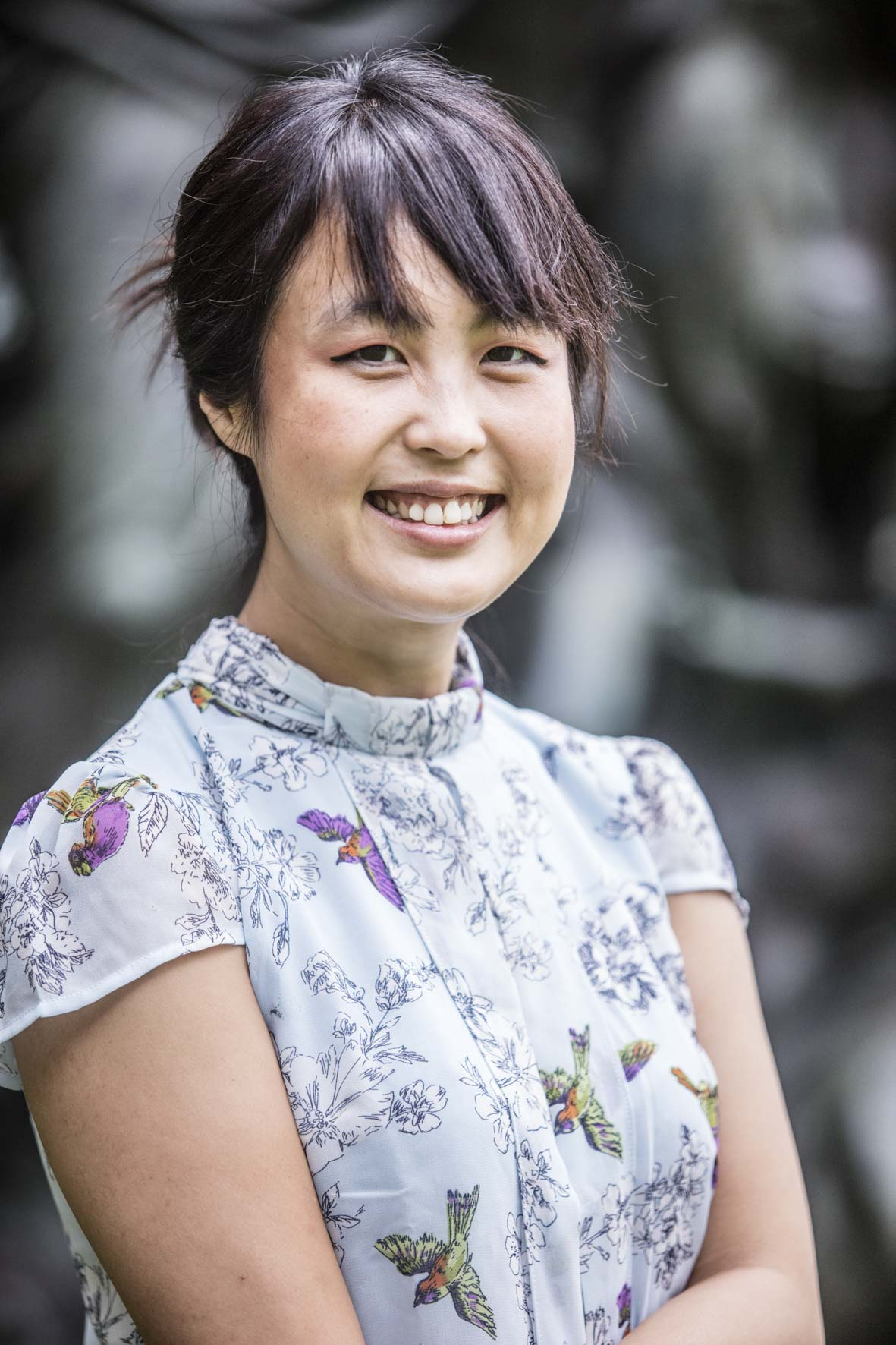
- Education: University of New South Wales
- Scientific career
- Fields: Neuroscience
- Workplaces: Florey Institute of Neuroscience and Mental Health

Jee Hyun Kim is an Australian behavioral neuroscientist whose work focuses on emotional learning and memory during childhood and adolescence. She is a professor, ARC future fellow, and head of the Molecular Psychiatry Laboratory at the Deakin University School of Medicine, Australia

Kim is an active science communicator, and has given public lectures at TEDx Melbourne, Australian Museum, National Portrait Gallery, Victorian Science Week, City of Melbourne (Melbourne Conversations), and the Wheeler Centre. She has also interviewed for ABC Radio, Radio New Zealand, SBS TV, Channel 10 (The Project), and was featured on ABC Catalyst.

== Research ==
Kim's research has demonstrated that the acquisition and retrieval of fear memories is different across childhood, adolescence, and adulthood, and that fear memories are able to be erased early in life. Kim's research uses rodent models that closely resemble human behaviors to understand the neurobiological basis of those behaviors. Specifically, her work investigates the role of memory and forgetting in the development and treatment of two major mental disorders across childhood and adolescence: anxiety disorder and substance use disorder.

To study anxiety, the Kim laboratory employs a classical conditioning paradigm based on the work of Ivan Pavlov known as fear conditioning. Despite originating 100 years ago, this model is widely used by modern scientists to uncover the neural mechanisms of fear and anxiety. To investigate substance abuse the Kim laboratory uses an operant conditioning paradigm based on the work of B. F. Skinner known as intravenous self-administration. Kim's research especially focuses on extinction, a form of inhibitory learning that forms the basis of exposure-based therapies for both anxiety and addiction disorders.

Kim has over 70 original publications to date, and her work has been cited in other publications over 2700 times.

== Career ==
Kim completed her undergraduate degree at the University of New South Wales (UNSW) in 2004, graduating with the University Medal in Psychology. She completed her PhD in psychology in 2008 at UNSW, during which time she published six original scientific articles. After graduating, Kim worked as a postdoctoral research fellow at UNSW, and then the University of Michigan. Kim then gained a position as a Senior Research Officer at the Florey Institute, before becoming head of the Developmental Psychobiology Laboratory at the institute.

=== Editorial activity ===
- Behavioural Brain Research, Invited Guest Editor for 2016 special issue Developmental Regulation of Memory in Anxiety and Addiction
- Frontiers in Behavioral Neuroscience, Review editor
- Frontiers in Pharmacology: Translational Pharmacology, Review editor
- Pharmacology Research & Perspectives, member of the editorial board

=== Community service ===
Kim is a vocal advocate for Women in Science, and has served on the committee for the Florey Committee for Equality is Science (EqIS). Kim was acknowledged for her role as a proponent for women in science in Kate White's book, Building effective career paths for women in science research: a case study of an Australian science research institute.

Kim is also a board member for the International Society for Developmental Psychobiology and has been a symposium organiser and chair at several international scientific conferences. Kim is the treasurer of Biological Psychiatry Australia.

== Awards ==
- International Society for Neurochemistry (ISN) Young Scientist Lectureship Award
- American College of Neuropsychopharmacology (ACNP) Travel Award, Senior Level
- Biological Psychiatry Australia, Aubrey Lewis Award 2017
- The International College of Neuropsychopharmacology (CINP), Rafaelsen Young Investigator Award 2016
- Australian Institute of Policy and Science, Victorian Tall Poppy Award 2014
- International Society for Developmental Psychobiology, Kucharski Young Investigator Award 2013
- Australian Psychological Society, Early Career Research Award 2012
- American Psychological Association, D.G. Marquis Award for Best paper published in Behavioral Neuroscience 2012
- University of New South Wales, U-Committee Award for Research Excellence in Science 2010
- International Society for Developmental Psychobiology, Dissertation Award 2009
- Australian Psychological Society, Prize for Excellence in PhD thesis in Psychology 2008
- International Society for Developmental Psychobiology, Sandra G. Wiener Student Investigator Award 2007
- Australian Psychological Society, Prize for the best performance in Psychology Honours 2004
- University of New South Wales, University Medal in Psychology 2004
