= The Opportunity Network =

- Formation: 2003
- Founder: Jessica Pliska
- Type: Nonprofit organization
- Legal status: 501(c)(3)
- Purpose: College access; career development; educational equity
- Headquarters: New York City, New York
- Region served: United States
- Key people: Lucria Ortiz (President & CEO); Ailun Ku (former CEO); Jessica Pliska (founder)
- Website: https://opportunitynetwork.org

The Opportunity Network (commonly known as OppNet) is a New York City–based nonprofit organization focused on expanding college and career opportunities for students from historically underrepresented communities. Founded in 2003 by nonprofit leader and social entrepreneur Jessica Pliska, the organization provides multi-year programming designed to increase college access, develop career readiness, and build professional networks for high-potential students.

== History ==
The Opportunity Network was established in 2003 by Jessica Pliska to address inequities in access to professional networks, internships, and long-term career guidance for first-generation and low-income students. Under Pliska’s leadership, OppNet developed a multi-year fellowship structure and the Career Fluency® curriculum, which emphasizes communication, professional readiness, and early-career skill building.

OppNet began as a small cohort program serving New York City high school students before expanding nationally through partnerships with schools, nonprofits, and higher-education institutions.

In 2023, Ailun Ku succeeded Pliska as CEO. In 2024, Lucria Ortiz was appointed the organization's new president and CEO.

== Programs ==
=== OppNet Fellows Program ===
The OppNet Fellows Program is a six-year trajectory beginning in the summer before 11th grade and continuing through college graduation. It includes:

- College application and financial aid advising
- Career exposure and internship preparation
- Networking training
- Professional skill-building workshops
- College persistence and early-career support

The Fellowship is anchored by Career Fluency®, OppNet’s core curriculum blending communication, career readiness, and professional mindset development.

=== Career Fluency® Partnerships ===
OppNet works with schools and community-based organizations nationwide to integrate its Career Fluency® curriculum into local student programming.

=== College and Career Success Services ===
OppNet provides individualized counseling, college-success coaching, internship placement, networking events, and opportunities to engage with corporate partners across finance, media, arts, technology, and public service sectors.

== Leadership ==
- Lucria Ortiz, president and CEO (2024–present).
- Ailun Ku, former president and CEO (2023–2024).
- Jessica Pliska, founder and former CEO.

=== Founder overview ===
As founder and longtime CEO, Pliska oversaw OppNet’s expansion from a small New York City cohort program to a national organization partnering with schools, nonprofits, and higher-education institutions. In The New Yorker, she described the hidden expectations shaping early-career access, noting that many students must “learn rules that others were born knowing.” She has also spoken in The Wall Street Journal about the academic and social challenges facing first-generation students, stating that “the playing field is not level,” a perspective tied to OppNet’s long-term mentorship model.

=== Board and advisors ===
OppNet’s board includes leaders from corporate, philanthropic, and educational sectors. Its partnerships include collaborations with institutions such as Connecticut College and the Heckscher Foundation for Children.

== Impact ==
In 2014, OppNet gained national visibility through the White House’s “Beating the Odds” summit, an initiative hosted by First Lady Michelle Obama for first-generation and low-income college-bound students. Reporting from CBS News noted that programs such as OppNet were represented at the event.

=== Student experiences ===
A detailed report from WNYC profiled Opportunity Network student Isaac Guerrero as one of the 130 participants in the summit. Guerrero, born and raised in Crown Heights, Brooklyn, described being accepted to 17 college engineering programs despite not having a computer of his own. He also spoke about his admission to the Massachusetts Institute of Technology and his summer internship at NASA, which he obtained through OppNet’s programming.

The feature noted that 19 New York City students attended the event, including Guerrero and Emir Brown-Murillo of Democracy Prep Charter School, who were the two students representing OppNet. The report also highlighted First Lady Michelle Obama’s message to participants, which OppNet founder Jessica Pliska described as especially impactful for students who related to her educational journey.

=== Additional recognition ===
OppNet’s model and leadership have appeared in national discussions on educational equity, structural racism, and workforce mobility in publications such as Harvard Business Review, Variety, Forbes, and NationSwell.

== Media coverage ==
OppNet and its leadership have been featured in:

- Variety, highlighting fundraising events and partnerships
- Patch, on higher-education collaborations
- New York Post, profiling the organization’s origins and early impact
- Forbes, through columns authored by founder Jessica Pliska
- PR Newswire coverage of leadership transitions

== See also ==
- Jessica Pliska
- Ailun Ku
- Lucria Ortiz
- Educational equity
- Youth development
