= Isdp =

ISDP may stand for:

== Organizations ==
International Society for Developmental Psychobiology

== Information Technology ==
Industry Standard Discovery Protocol
