= Virginia Henry Curtiss Heckscher =

- Heckscher in 1932
- Born: Virginia Henry; 1875; Vienna
- Died: July 11, 1941 (aged 66); Manhattan
- Known for: Philanthropist
- Spouses: Edwin Burr Curtiss (died 1928) August Heckscher (m. 1930–1940)

Virginia Henry Curtiss (1875 – July 11, 1941) was president of The Heckscher Foundation for Children and was a member of New York City's Child Welfare Board.

== Biography ==
She was born in 1875 in Vienna and educated in England. She married widower Edwin Burr Curtiss, of A. G. Spalding Bros. Curtiss commissioned the architects Carrère and Hastings, who had also designed the original clubhouse for the Greenwich Country Club, to build him a house on North Street in Greenwich, Connecticut. Curtiss died at his residence in Mountain Lake, Florida, on March 30, 1928

After his death, 55 year old Virginia married 81 year old August Heckscher on July 2, 1930, in the parsonage of the Asbury Methodist Episcopal Church in Croton-on-Hudson, New York. August Heckscher, who was born in Hamburg, Germany, died on April 26, 1941, at their home in Mountain Lake, Florida and left his widow $10,000 and all his real estate. She died less than three months later on July 11, 1941. No legatee could be found that was named in her will and the probate court declared an earlier copy of the will as valid. Part of her art collection was donated to an armed forces art program.
