= Howard Sloane =

American lawyer

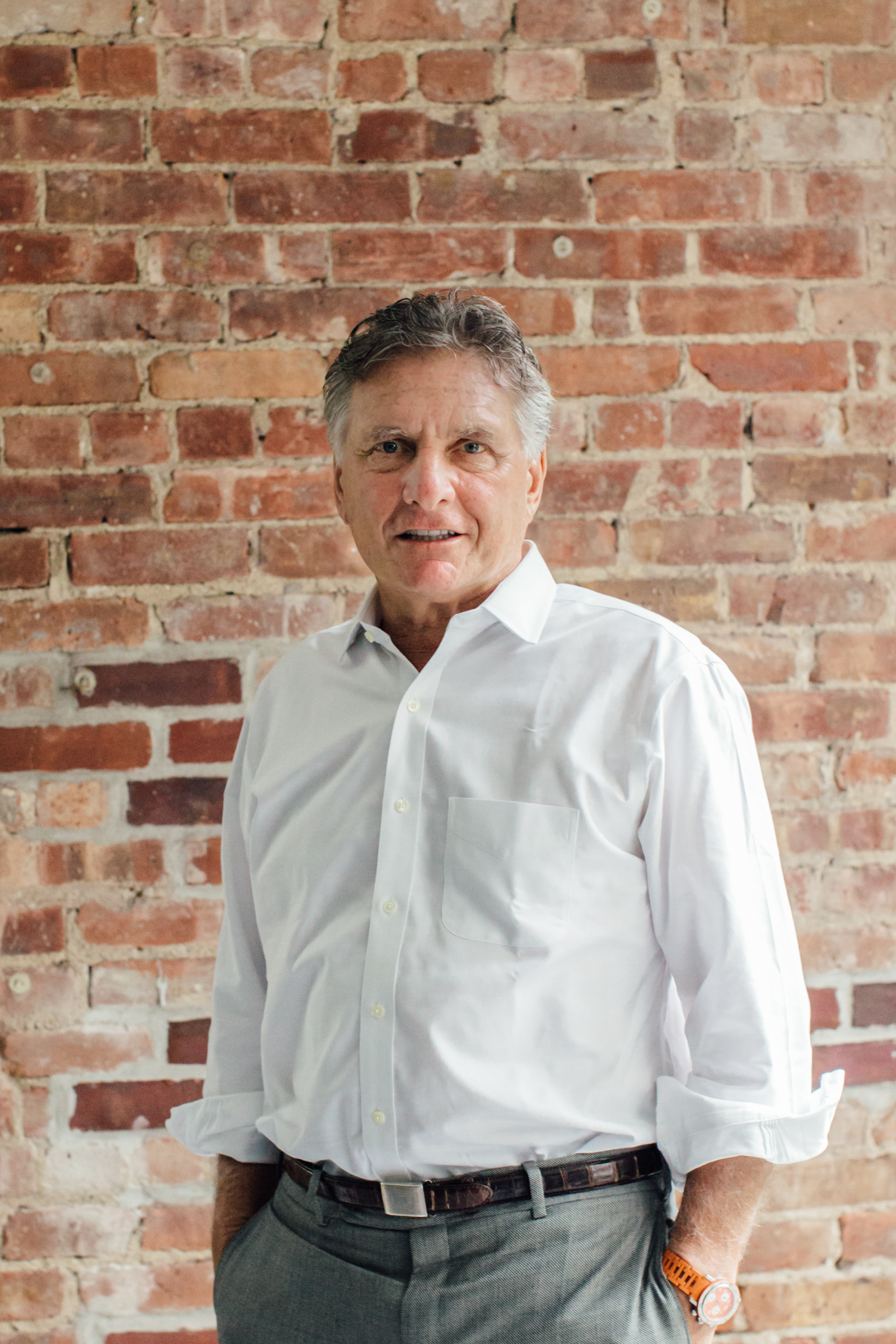
Howard G. (Peter) Sloane

Howard G. (Peter) Sloane (born December, 1950) is an American lawyer, executive, and philanthropist currently serving as chairman and CEO of The Heckscher Foundation for Children.. He has long been a leader in education: co-founder and Trustee of the first charter school in New York, Sisulu Walker Charter School of Harlem; co-founder of Take the Field which led the renovation of 43 public school sports fields in NYC.; Vice Chair of the Board of the Horace Mann School, Trustee of Leadership for a Diverse America; and Trustee of the Maria New Childrens Hormone Foundation.

== Early life ==
Sloane was born in California and grew up in New York. He attended the University of Glasgow from 1970 to 1971, completed his undergraduate degree at Ohio Wesleyan University in 1972 and graduated from Suffolk University Law School in 1976 after a year spent at NYU Law School.

== Legal career ==
Sloane was a partner at Cahill Gordon & Reindel which he joined in 1977 after clerking for the Honorable Thomas C. Platt on the U.S. District Court for the Eastern District of New York.

He served as Co-Administrative Partner for 23 years and served in other leadership roles throughout his career. From 2004 until his retirement, he served as co-chair of the firm's pro bono committee. As pro bono partner, Sloane established a partnership with the Legal Aid Society of New York. Sloane's law practice was focused in litigation. He litigated cases focused on open space and historic preservation. He represented the Municipal Art Society in its fight to preserve from the wrecking ball St Bartholemew's Church, for which he was honored by Jacqueline Kennedy Onassis, and The Church of Saint Paul and Saint Andrew.

== Publications ==
- Sloane, Peter (July 19, 2023). "Real jobs for eager young people: The Heckscher Foundation Challenge to help college grads get their start". New York Daily News. Archived from the original on 2023-07-19.
- Sloane, Peter (2015-05-01). "Creating a Culture of Mentorship Among Young Professionals — It Starts With Senior Management". Philanthropy News Digest.
- Sloane, Peter (2015-09-15). "Scaling Back on Scaling: Assessing whether and how to grow for social profit". Candid.
- Sloane, Peter (2016-07-18). "Nurturing Nonprofit Boards: Funders Can Do More". Candid.
- Sloane, Peter (2017-05-15). "A Call for Inflection Point Funding". Philanthropy News Digest.
- Sloane, Peter (2018-07-05). "CUNY: A Model for Expanding College Access and Success for Low-Income Students". Philanthropy News Digest.
- Sloane, Peter (2018-10-19). "The Best Way to Make a Huge Impact as a Mentor". Inc.
- Sloane, Peter (2019-10-20). "Sloane: Giving Parents Information Helps Them Choose the Best Schools for Their Kids. How 3 Data-Sharing Tools Are Working for NY Families". The74.
- Sloane, Peter (2020-12-02). "Being bold in a time of uncertainty". Philanthropy News Digest.
- Sloane, Peter (2022-01-05). "Sloane: American Public Education Is Broken. In the Absence of Political Leadership, 4 Ways Philanthropy Can Boldly Step Up". The74.
- Sloane, Peter (2024-08-07) "For Youth Job Training Programs to Work, Employers Must Have Skin in the Game" The74 https://www.the74million.org/article/729407/

== Personal life ==
Sloane is married to Jaar-mel Sevin, a New York City real estate executive. They live in Manhattan and have three children.
