= Luella Gear =

American actress (1897–1980)

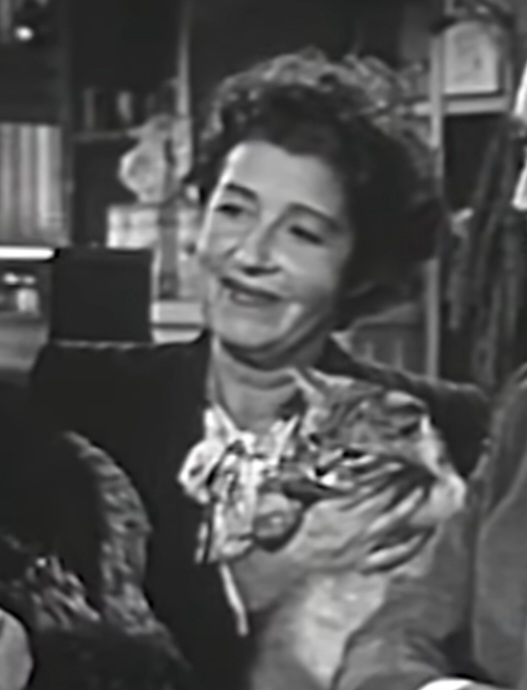
- Gear in Jigsaw (1949)
- Born: September 5, 1897; New York City, New York, U.S.
- Died: April 3, 1980 (aged 82); The Bronx, New York, U.S.
- Resting place: Woodlawn Cemetery (Bronx, New York)
- Education: Spence School
- Occupation: Actress
- Years active: 1917–1964
- Spouses: Byron Chandler (m. 1919; div. 1924) Gustave Maurice Heckscher (m. 1927; div. 1933) Frederick W.A. Engel (div. 1940)

Luella Gear (September 5, 1897 – April 3, 1980) was an American actress. She appeared in numerous films, TV series and theatrical productions throughout the 1910s to the 1960s

== Early life ==
Gear was born in New York in 1897. She attended the Spence School and was educated in Brussels, Belgium.

== Career ==
She made her acting debut in 1917, appearing in the Broadway musical Love O' Mike. She subsequently appeared in Broadway productions such as The Gold Diggers, A Dangerous Maid, Poppy, The Optimists, Gay Divorce and Life Begins at 8:40.

During World War II, she toured with the wartime comedy play Count Me In as part of the USO, entertaining the troops.

She also appeared in films like Queen High, Carefree, Lady in the Dark, The Perfect Marriage and Jigsaw and TV series like Broadway Television Theatre, The Big Story, The Elgin Hour and Joe and Mabel.

== Personal life ==
Gear was married three times: to New York playboy Byron Chandler, aviator Gustave Maurice Heckscher, and Frederick W.A. Engel. She had no children.

Gear died in The Bronx on April 3, 1980, at the age of 82. She was buried at Woodlawn Cemetery.

== Selected filmography ==
=== Film ===
- Adam and Eva (1923) as Julie Dewitt
- Carefree (1938) as Aunt Cora
- The Perfect Marriage (1947) as Dolly Haggerty
- Jigsaw (1949) as Pet Shop Owner
- Phffft (1954) as Edith Chapman

=== Television ===
- The Trap - "Chocolate Cobweb" (1950), TV episode
- Sure as Fate - "Tremolo" (1950), TV episode
- The Web - "Death Mask" (1952), TV episode
- Broadway Television Theatre - "The Patsy" (1952), TV episode, as Ma Harrington
- The Big Story - "Arthur Mielke of the Washington Times Herald" (1954), TV episode, as Mrs. Ferill
- The Elgin Hour - "Falling Star" (1954), TV episode, as Mom Morton
- Producers' Showcase - "Happy Birthday" (1956), TV episode, as Emma
- Joe and Mabel - "Joe's Bankbook" (1956), TV episode, as Mrs. Spooner
- Play of the Week - "Juno and the Paycock" (1960), TV episode
- The Defenders - "The Search" (1962), TV episode, as Mrs. Carney and "Conflict of Interests" (1964), TV episode, as Delia Leary

== Selected stage credits ==
- Love O' Mike (1917)
- The Gold Diggers (1919)
- Elsie (1923)
- Poppy (1923)
- Queen High (1926)
- Gay Divorce (1932)
- Life Begins at 8:40 (1934)
- On Your Toes (1936)
- Sabrina Fair (1953)
