= Johann Gustav Heckscher =

German politician

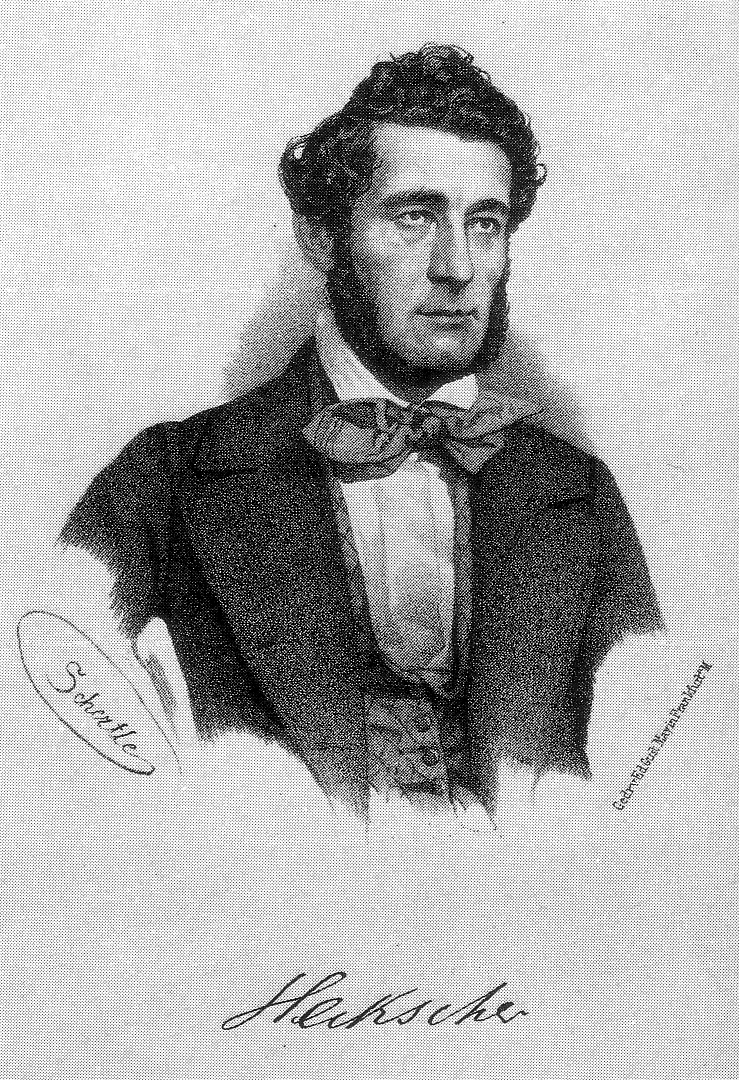
Johann Gustav Wilhelm Moritz Heckscher, 1848

Johann Gustav Wilhelm Moritz Heckscher (born 26 December 1797 in Hamburg; died 7 April 1865 in Vienna) was a German politician.

== Biography ==
Heckscher was the son of Martin Anton Heckscher (1762-1823), a banker in Hamburg, Germany and Eva Schlesinger Heckscher (1768-1851). He had at three or more siblings: Leopold (born 1792), Carl Martin Adolph (1796–1850), and Carl August (born 1806). Carl August married Georgiana Louisa Coster, daughter of John Gerard Coster.

He served during the War of 1815 as a volunteer in the Hanseatic Corps, and then studied at the universities of Göttingen and Heidelberg. Upon completing his studies he settled in Hamburg, where he practiced law, and, after 1840, directed the politics of the Hamburger Nachrichten. In 1848 he was elected to the Vorparlament, in which he opposed the propositions of the Democratic Party. In the Frankfurt Parliament proper (1848–49), he was at first a member of the left center, but gradually inclined to identify himself with the right. He advocated the election of Archduke John of Austria as vicar of the provisional national government (Reichsverweser), in which he himself was appointed minister of justice, and opposed the proposition to exclude Austria and erect a German empire with a Prussian king as hereditary emperor. Later he helped to organize the Pan-German Party.

== See also ==
- August Heckscher, his son.
- August Heckscher II, his great-grandson.
