= The Perfect Marriage =

1947 film by Lewis Allen

- Theatrical release poster
- Directed by: Lewis Allen
- Written by: Leonard Spigelgass
- Based on: The Perfect Marriage (play) by Samson Raphaelson
- Produced by: Hal B. Wallis
- Starring: Loretta Young; David Niven; Eddie Albert; Charlie Ruggles; Virginia Field; Rita Johnson
- Cinematography: Russell Metty
- Edited by: Ellsworth Hoagland
- Music by: Friedrich Hollaender
- Production company: Paramount Pictures
- Distributed by: Paramount Pictures
- Release date: February 24, 1947
- Running time: 88 minutes
- Country: United States
- Language: English
- Box office: $1.3 million

The Perfect Marriage is a 1947 American comedy film directed by Lewis Allen and written by Leonard Spigelgass. The film stars Loretta Young, David Niven, Eddie Albert, Charlie Ruggles, Virginia Field, and Rita Johnson. The film was released on February 24, 1947, by Paramount Pictures.

== Plot ==
On their tenth wedding anniversary, both husband and wife tell the other that they want a divorce.

== Cast ==
- Loretta Young as Maggie Williams
- David Niven as Dale Williams
- Eddie Albert as Gil Cummins
- Charlie Ruggles as Dale Williams Sr.
- Virginia Field as Gloria
- Rita Johnson as Mabel Manning
- ZaSu Pitts as Rosa
- Nona Griffith as Cookie Williams
- Nana Bryant as Corinne Williams
- Jerome Cowan as Addison Manning
- Luella Gear as Dolly Haggerty
- Howard Freeman as Peter Haggerty

== Reception ==
T.M.P. of The New York Times said, "Whatever it was about The Perfect Marriage which convinced Producer Hal Wallis that this Samson Raphaelson-play was worth the trouble and expense of filming just doesn't come through on the screen. For the new potpourri of comedy, farce and drama, which opened yesterday at the Paramount Theatre, is a singularly shapeless and unrewarding entertainment. Not being acquainted with the play, we wouldn't know whether Leonard Spigelgass, the scenarist, tampered to any great extent with the original. But (and this is the only thing that matters right now) it is quite evident that Mr. Spigelgass certainly didn't contribute any improvements. He wrote an abundance of dialogue, to be sure, but most of it is witless."
