= Ailun Ku =

- Occupations: nonprofit executive; youth development leader
- Organization: The Opportunity Network (former)
- Known for: Former president and CEO of The Opportunity Network
- Website: https://www.ailunku.com

Ailun Ku is an American nonprofit executive and youth development leader who previously served as the president and chief executive officer of The Opportunity Network (OppNet), a New York City–based organization focused on expanding college and career access for students from historically underrepresented communities. She is known for her work on racial equity, organizational culture, program design, and educational opportunity.

Ku's leadership has been featured in national outlets including Variety, NationSwell, WeWork's Member Spotlight series, and philanthropic organizations. She succeeded founder Jessica Pliska as CEO in 2023 and later stepped down following the organization's 2024 leadership transition.

== Early life and education ==
Public information about Ku's early life and education is limited. Professional profiles note that her early career focused on youth development, community engagement, and educational equity before joining The Opportunity Network.

== Career ==
=== The Opportunity Network ===
Ku joined The Opportunity Network in 2010 and held several leadership roles before becoming president and later CEO. As president, she oversaw strategic planning, program development, partnership expansion, and organizational culture.

In 2023, OppNet announced Ku as its next CEO, succeeding founder Jessica Pliska.

Ku later stepped down from the role. In 2024, OppNet announced that Lucria Ortiz had been appointed as the organization's new President and CEO.

=== Thought leadership and advocacy ===
Ku is widely recognized for her emphasis on racial equity, inclusive organizational culture, and the importance of creating environments where young people—particularly those from underrepresented communities—can "belong, learn, and lead." Her thought leadership highlights the intersection of opportunity, identity, and social mobility.

In a profile by NationSwell, Ku described education as a process of "unstoppable learning," arguing that young people thrive when institutions build systems that treat learning as continual, adaptive, and culturally grounded. She emphasized that students should not be expected to navigate inequitable systems alone, noting that real opportunity requires both access and structural support.

In an interview with Mission North, Ku discussed the importance of designing organizations where young BIPOC professionals experience a genuine sense of belonging. She stated that her work focuses on creating "a culture of belonging" that allows participants and staff to fully show up without code-switching or minimizing parts of their identity.

WeWork's Member Spotlight similarly highlighted Ku's leadership philosophy, describing her emphasis on "wholeness and authentic leadership" as central to her approach. Ku has stated that young people need both "the skills to succeed and the spaces to feel seen," and that program design must acknowledge the structural barriers students face rather than framing opportunity as an individual achievement.

Collectively, Ku's writing, speaking, and program design work position her as a prominent voice in youth development, belonging-centered leadership, and equity-driven organizational strategy.

== See also ==
- Educational equity
- Positive youth development
