= Joe and Mabel =

American radio (1941–42) tv (1955–56) program

Joe and Mabel is an American comedy series about a cab driver and his girlfriend that began as a 1940s radio program and was later broadcast as a television series during portions of 1955 and 1956.

== Radio ==
The radio version of Joe and Mabel debuted on NBC on February 13, 1941, and ended on September 27, 1942. During that time it was broadcast intermittently, rather than regularly. Characters in the program and the actors who portrayed them are shown in the table below.

| Character | Actor |
|---|---|
| Joe | Ted de Corsia |
| Mabel | Ann Thomas |
| Mike | Walter Kinsella |
| Mabel's brother | Jackie Grimes |
| Mabel's mother | Betty Garde |

Howard Nussbaum was the director, and Irving Gaynor Nieman was the writer.

== Television ==
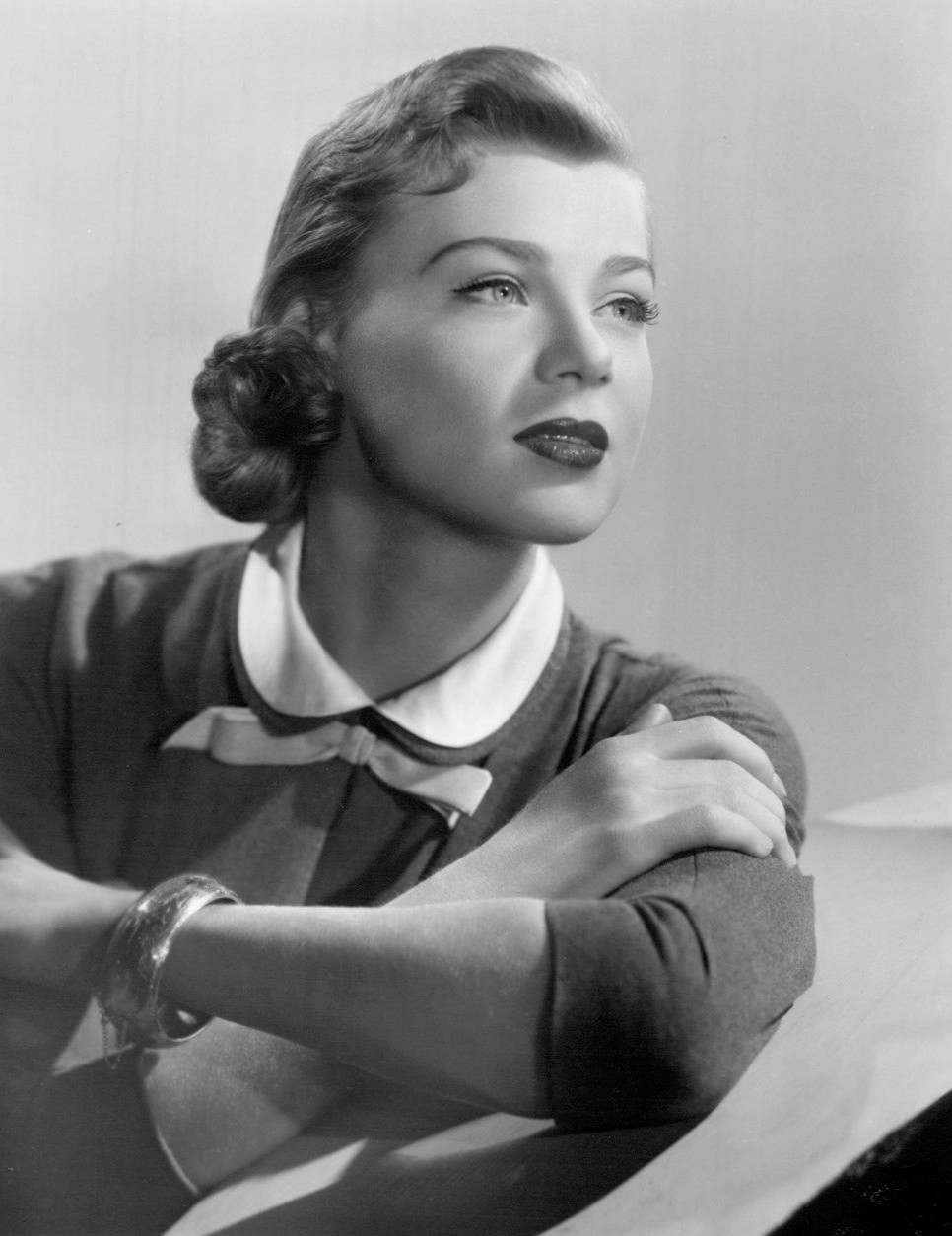
Nita Talbot portrayed Mabel Spooner in the TV version of Joe and Mabel.

Joe and Mabel began on CBS television on September 20, 1955, and ran "for only a few weeks", then returned on June 26, 1956, and ran until September 25, 1956.

The trade publication Variety reported in 1956 that episodes of the series "made last year were tossed out the window, for they didn't pass muster with the high brass. CBS started all over again this season."

The show's premise was that Mabel was eager to marry cab driver Joe. He loved her but was reluctant to commit to marriage. Joe and his friend Mike (also a cab driver) often hung out at a diner, where Harry worked at the counter.

The program's characters and the actors who portrayed them are shown in the table below.

| Character | Actor |
|---|---|
| Joe | Larry Blyden |
| Mabel | Nita Talbot |
| Mabel's mother | Luella Gear |
| Mabel's brother | Michael Mann |
| Mabel's friend, Dolly | Shirl Conway |
| Mike | Norman Fell |
| Harry | John Shellie |

Ezra Stone, Daniel Petrie, and Paul Bogart were directors. Alex Gottlieb and Bogart were producers, and Marlo Lewis was executive producer. Writers were Harold Flender, Lucille Kallen, James Lee, Irving Gaynor Neiman, Harvey Orkin, Aaron Ruben, Jerry Ryan, and Phil Sharp. Sponsors were Pharmaceuticals, Incorporated, (for Sominex, Serutan, and Geritol) and Carter Products (for Arrid and Rise). The 30-minute episodes were filmed in black-and-white with a laugh track.
