= John D. Idol =

American businessman

- Born: 1958 or 1959 (age 66–67)
- Occupation: Businessman
- Title: Chairman and CEO, Capri Holdings

John D. Idol (born 1958/1959) is an American businessman, and the chairman and CEO of Capri Holdings (formerly Michael Kors Holdings). He has been the CEO since 2003, and the chairman since 2011.

== Career ==
Idol held senior positions at Ralph Lauren, before becoming the CEO of Donna Karan, a position he held from 1997 to 2001.

In 2003, Idol along with Hong Kong-based private equity firm Sportswear Holdings, bought the Michael Kors company for $100 million.

Idol owns only 1% of the company, having sold shares worth in excess of $400 million since the initial public offering (IPO).

In 2018 he was part of the consortium led by Lawrence Stroll in the purchase of Force India F1 Team. The team was pulled out of administration following the purchase and is currently named Aston Martin Cognizant F1 Team.

== Personal life ==
In 2015, Idol bought a penthouse in the Palm Beach Biltmore in Palm Beach, Florida, for $7.4 million, previously owned by Pari-Sima Pahlavi, widow of Abdul Reza Pahlavi of Iran.
