= Julian Wheeler Curtiss =

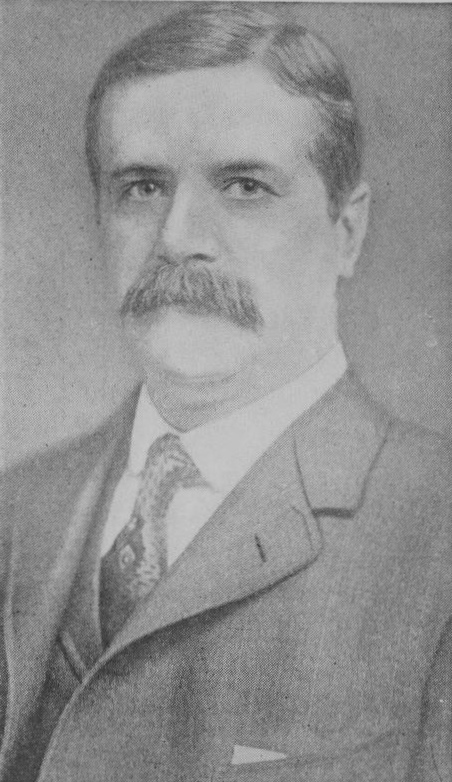
- Julian W. Curtiss
- Born: August 29, 1858; Fairfield, Connecticut
- Died: February 17, 1944
- Occupation: President of the Spalding

Julian Wheeler Curtiss (1858–1944) was president of the Spalding sports equipment company and a pioneering promoter of golf in the United States.

== Early life ==
Curtiss was born in Fairfield, Connecticut, on August 29, 1858. Among his siblings was older brother, Edwin Burr Curtiss, a lawyer and later, bookseller.

He attended Hopkins Grammar School in New Haven, Connecticut and the Brooklyn Polytechnic Institute. He graduated from Yale University in 1879, where he had been active in various sports, crew especially.

== Career ==
Curtiss joined the A.G. Spalding Company after college. In 1885 he became secretary of the company, and in 1920 president. He retired from the presidency in 1933, but remained on the board, serving as its chair until 1938.

On a trip to London in 1892 to buy leather to make footballs in the U.S., he was introduced to golf. He brought home with him $400 worth of equipment and started the first manufacture of golf equipment in the United States. In 1892 with his brother, Edwin Burr Curtiss, and others he started the Fairfield County Golf Club, today known as the Greenwich Country Club. Curtiss served as the club's first President, from 1892 to 1896, and again from 1921 to 1934.

Curtiss was affiliated with the Amateur Athletic Union and became treasurer of the American Olympic Committee. He was one of the figures, together with Walter Camp and others, responsible at the turn of the twentieth century with popularizing sports in the U.S. and making it a central part of American culture. He designed the first basketball in association with James Naismith, the inventor of the game.

From 1902 to 1911 he served as graduate coach of the Yale crew team, turning out five championship outfits, and from 1918 to 1940, he refereed many of the foremost crew races in the East.

== Personal life ==
In October 1880, Curtiss married Mary Louise Case, daughter of Joseph S. Case of New York. They settled in Greenwich, Connecticut where Curtiss commissioned the architects Carrère and Hastings, who had also designed the original clubhouse for the Greenwich Country Club, to build him a house. Together, Julian and Mary had four children.

He was very active in Greenwich, serving as the first president of the Greenwich YMCA. He also served on the Greenwich Board of Education from 1913 to 1937, chairing it from 1924 to 1937.

He died at Greenwich Hospital on February 17, 1944.
