= Ferdinand Heckscher =

German-Jewish actor (1806–1891)

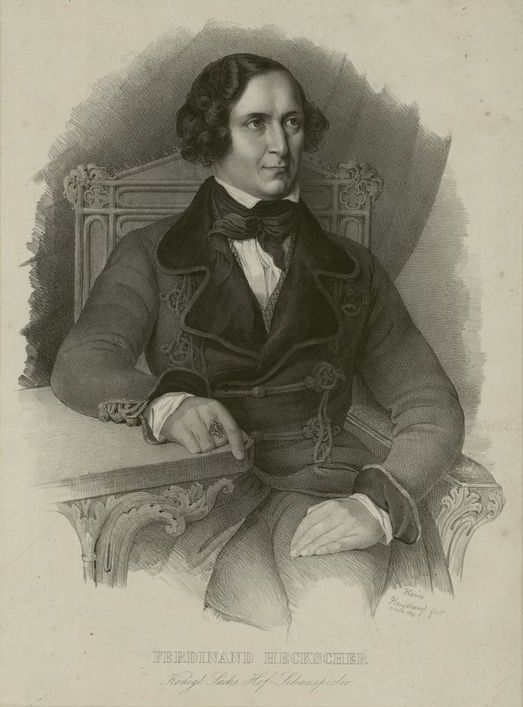
- Born: 1806; Berlin, Kingdom of Prussia
- Died: 28 February 1891 (aged 84–85); Sondershausen, German Empire
- Occupations: Actor, singer

Ferdinand Heckscher (1806 – 28 February 1891) was a German-Jewish actor.

== Biography ==
Heckscher, who had a fine bass voice, began his theatrical career as a singer, but, finding his opportunities in this field too limited, he abandoned music entirely in 1833 and devoted his energies to the drama.

He studied under Benelli and at the private theater Urania, Berlin, and made his début at the Königstädtische Theatre in that city in 1825. From 1826 to 1830 he was at Sondershausen; from 1830 to 1832 at Bremen; 1832–34 at Königsberg; 1834–41 at the Hoftheater, Dresden, where he played in company with Emil Devrient, Carl Weymar, and F. W. Porth; from 1841 to 1845 at Breslau; and until 1846 as director of the theatre at Sondershausen. He retired shortly after. He appeared as a star at the Hoftheater, Berlin, and in Cassel, Coburg, Brunswick, Lübeck, Königsberg, and Danzig.

Heckscher's principal roles were Ingomar, Stephan Foster, Wetter von Strahl, Wallenstein, Otto III, Don Ramiro, Fiesco, and Molière in Gutzkow's Das Urbild des Tartuffes.
