= August Heckscher II =

American author (1913–1997)

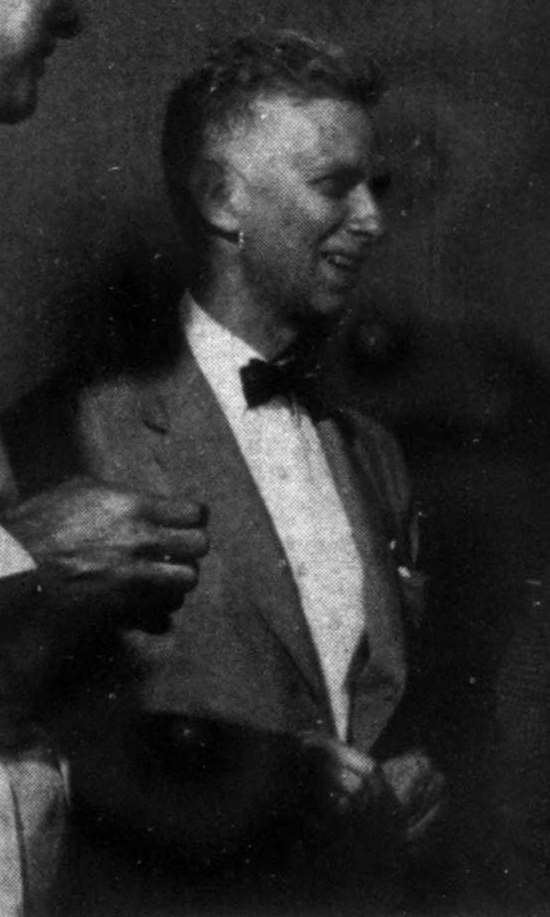
- Heckscher c. 1960

Parks Commissioner of New York City
- In office 1967–1972
- Appointed by: John V. Lindsay
- Preceded by: Thomas Hoving
- Succeeded by: Richard M. Clurman

Personal details
- Born: September 16, 1913 Huntington, New York, U.S.
- Died: April 5, 1997 (aged 83) New York City, New York, U.S.
- Spouse: Claude Chevreux (m. 1941)
- Children: Stephan A. Heckscher; Philip H. Heckscher; Charles C. Heckscher
- Parent(s): Gustave Maurice Heckscher; Frances Louise Vanderhoef
- Relatives: August Heckscher (grandfather)
- Education: St. Paul's School
- Alma mater: Yale College; Harvard University

August Heckscher II (September 16, 1913 – April 5, 1997) was an American public intellectual and author whose work explored the American liberalism of political leaders including Woodrow Wilson.

== Early life ==
Heckscher was born in Huntington on Long Island on September 16, 1913. He was the son of Gustave Maurice Heckscher (1884–1967) and Frances Louise Vanderhoef. His parents divorced in 1927 and his mother remarried to John M. P. Thatcher in 1931. His brother was Gustave Maurice Heckscher Jr.

He was also the grandson of capitalist August Heckscher (1848–1941), who emigrated from Germany in 1867. His maternal grandfather was Harmon B. Vanderhoef (d. 1941).

He attended St. Paul's School in Concord, New Hampshire. He graduated from Yale in 1936 and later received a master's degree in government from Harvard University.

== Career ==
During World War II, he worked for the Office of the Coordinator of Information in Washington as well as the Office of Strategic Services in North Africa. In addition, he worked with the United States at the United Nations Conference on International Organization in 1945.

From 1946 to 1948, he was an editor at the Auburn Citizen Advertiser. From 1948 to 1956, he was an editorial writer at the New York Herald Tribune. From 1956 to 1967 he was a director of the Twentieth Century Fund.

In 1962, he began his service as the first White House Special Consultant on the Arts as the coordinator of cultural matters appointed by President John F. Kennedy. He was in this role until 1963.

In 1967, he was appointed by New York City Mayor John Lindsay as Parks Commissioner of New York City, succeeding Thomas Hoving, who left to become the Director of the Metropolitan Museum of Art. In 1968, Lindsay appointed him to be the first Administrator of The Parks, Recreation and Cultural Affairs Administration (PRCA) was created to consolidate the city's more than 50 agencies into a dozen "superagencies." His tenure as Commissioner/Administrator was noted for the 1967 concert in the park by Barbra Streisand, which was attended by 250,000 people, the first New York City Marathon, which was held in Central Park in 1970, and a number of very large-scale antiwar demonstrations, in the park, for which permits were issued. He resigned as Administrator in 1972.

== Personal life ==
In 1941, Heckscher was married to Claude Chevreux (d. 2008). Claude was the daughter of Charles Chevreux of Clermont-Ferrand, France, the Prefect of the Puy-de-Dôme at Clermont-Ferrand and formerly of the French legation in Algeria and French Morocco. As her parents could not attend the wedding, she was given away by her cousin, Pierre Landrieu. Together, they were the parents of:

- Stephan August Heckscher, who was a co-executor and co-trustee of his estate with Francis X. Morrissey Jr.. Morrissey was convicted of forgery in his work for Brooke Astor. Stephan married Donna Elizabeth Hunt in 1966.
- Philip H. Heckscher
- Charles C. Heckscher (b. 1949), a professor in the Department of Labor Studies and Employment at Rutgers University.

Heckscher died on April 5, 1997, at New York Hospital. His widow, Claude, died in 2008.

Political offices
Preceded by Thomas Hoving	Parks Commissioner of New York City; 1967– 1972	Succeeded by Richard M. Clurman
