= Edwin Burr Curtiss =

American attorney and bookseller

- Born: July 14, 1852; Fairfield, Connecticut, US
- Died: March 30, 1928 (aged 75); Mountain Lake, Florida, US
- Resting place: Putnam Cemetery, Greenwich
- Education: Columbia Law School
- Board member of: A. G. Spalding Bros.
- Spouses: Carrie A. Case (died 1907) Virginia Henry ()
- Relatives: Julian Wheeler Curtiss (brother)

Edwin Burr Curtiss (July 14, 1852 – March 30, 1928) was an American attorney, bookseller, and a director of A. G. Spalding Bros.

== Early life ==
He was born on July 14, 1852, in Fairfield, Connecticut. He was the third child born to Henry Tomlinson Curtiss (1796–1876) and Mary Eliza Henderson (née Beardsley) Curtiss (1821–1886), who married in 1844. His younger brother was Julian Wheeler Curtiss, president of the Spalding sports equipment company.

His maternal grandparents were Cyrus H. Beardsley and Maria (née Burr) Beardsley. His paternal grandfather was Henry Curtiss, a descendant of William Curtiss, who came to America from England about 1650 and settled at Stratford, Connecticut of which he helped found. From 1667 to 1686, he represented Stratford in the General Court and in 1672, he served as one of six commissioners with the governor John Winthrop the Younger, the deputy governor, and assistants as a War Council against the Dutch in New York, and was distinguished for bravery in King Philip's War.

After two years of studying abroad, Edwin graduated from Columbia Law School.

== Career ==
After graduation from law school, he practiced law in New York City for two years before forming the firm of Cunningham, Curtiss & Welsh in 1878. The firm was a wholesale stationers and booksellers, blank book manufacturers, printers, and lithographers headquartered in San Francisco, Curtiss was based primarily in New York City. In 1892, together with his brother and others, he started the Fairfield County Golf Club in Greenwich, Connecticut.

By 1900 and at least through 1908, he was a vice president of the American Booksellers Association. He retired from the law in 1908 and was a director of A. G. Spalding Bros.

== Personal life ==
Curtiss was twice married. His first marriage was to Carrie A. Case, daughter of Joseph S. Case of New York and the sister of his brother's wife, Mary Louise Case. Carrie wife died at St. Luke's Hospital in New York on July 20, 1907.

After the death of his first wife, he remarried to Virginia Henry (1875–1941), who was born in Vienna and educated in England. Curtiss commissioned the architects Carrère and Hastings, who had also designed the original clubhouse for the Greenwich Country Club, to build him a house on North Street in Greenwich, Connecticut.

Curtiss died at his residence in Mountain Lake, Florida on March 30, 1928. He was buried at the Putnam Cemetery in Greenwich. After his death, his widow remarried to August Heckscher, the German-born capitalist and philanthropist.
