= Developmental Psychobiology (journal) =

- Discipline: Developmental psychology
- Language: English
- Edited by: Amanda M. Dettmer

Publication details
- History: 1968–present
- Publisher: John Wiley & Sons on behalf of the International Society for Developmental Psychobiology
- Frequency: 8/year
- Impact factor: 1.8 (2023)

Standard abbreviations
- ISO 4: Dev. Psychobiol.

Indexing
- CODEN: DEPBA5
- ISSN: 0012-1630 (print); 1098-2302 (web)
- LCCN: 68006883
- OCLC no.: 913788

Links
- Journal homepage; Online access; Online archive

Developmental Psychobiology is a peer-reviewed scientific journal, established in 1968 and currently published by John Wiley & Sons on behalf of the International Society for Developmental Psychobiology. It covers research on all aspects of behavioral development in animals and humans.

== Abstracting and indexing ==
The journal is abstracted and indexed in:

- Elsevier BIOBASE
- Biological Abstracts
- BIOSIS Previews
- CAB Abstracts
- Cambridge Scientific Abstracts
- Chemical Abstracts Service
- CSA Biological Sciences Database
- Current Awareness in Biological Sciences
- Current Contents/Life Sciences
- EMBASE/Excerpta Medica
- Index Medicus/MEDLINE/PubMed
- Neuroscience Citation Index
- Psychological Abstracts/PsycINFO
- Science Citation Index
- Scopus
- The Zoological Record

According to the Journal Citation Reports, the journal has a 2023 impact factor of 1.8.
