= Capri Holdings =

Multinational fashion holding company

Capri Holdings Limited
- Formerly: Michael Kors Holdings Limited
- Type: Public
- Traded as: NYSE: CPRI; S&P 600 component
- ISIN: VGG1890L1076
- Industry: Fashion
- Founded: 1981; 45 years ago
- Founder: Michael Kors
- Headquarters: Executive offices: London; Operations offices: New York City
- Area served: Worldwide
- Key people: John D. Idol (chairman and CEO)
- Products: Apparel; handbags; footwear; watches; accessories
- Revenue: ▼US$5.17 billion (2024)
- Operating income: ▼US$−241 million (2024)
- Net income: ▼US$−229 million (2024)
- Total assets: ▼US$6.69 billion (2024)
- Total equity: ▼US$1.60 billion (2024)
- Number of employees: 15,100 (2024)
- Subsidiaries: Michael Kors; Jimmy Choo
- Website: capriholdings.com

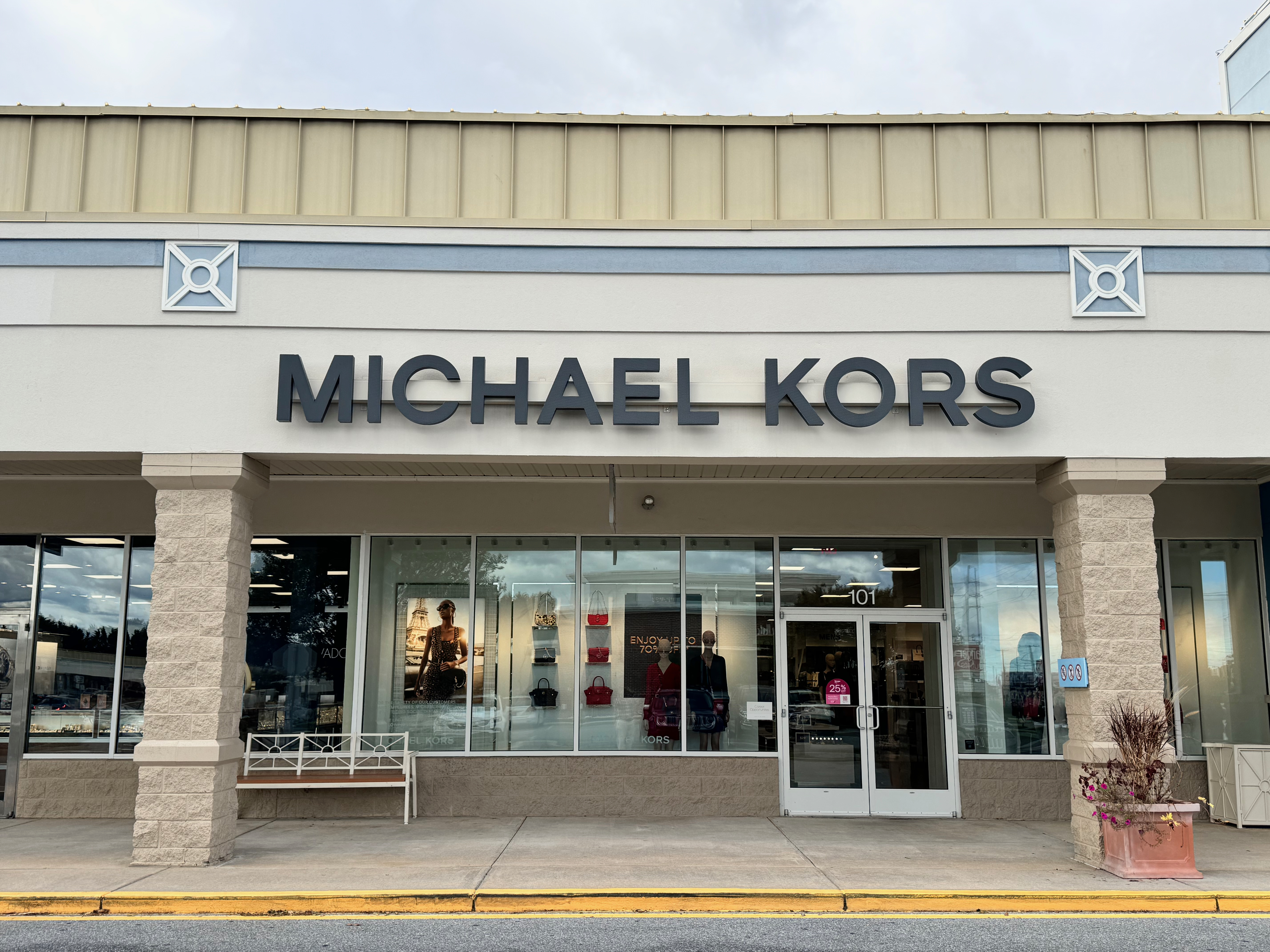
A Michael Kors retail store in Rehoboth Beach, Delaware

Capri Holdings Limited (formerly Michael Kors Holdings Limited) is a multinational fashion holding company, incorporated in the British Virgin Islands, with executive offices in London and operational offices in New York City. It was founded in 1981 by American designer Michael Kors. The company sells clothes, shoes, watches, handbags, and other accessories. In 2015, the company had more than 550 stores and over 1,500 in-store boutiques in various countries.

Capri is the parent company of the eponymous Michael Kors brand and Jimmy Choo. It previously owned Versace, which was sold to Prada in 2025. Tapestry, owner of Coach New York and Kate Spade, offered to buy Capri for $8.5 billion in 2023, but called off the acquisition after it was blocked by a federal judge the following year.

== Background ==
Founder Michael Kors enrolled at the Fashion Institute of Technology in New York City in 1977, but dropped out after nine months. Taking a job as a sales person at a boutique called Lothar's across from Bergdorf Goodman on 57th Street in Midtown Manhattan, he later became both the designer and visual display head for the store.

== History ==
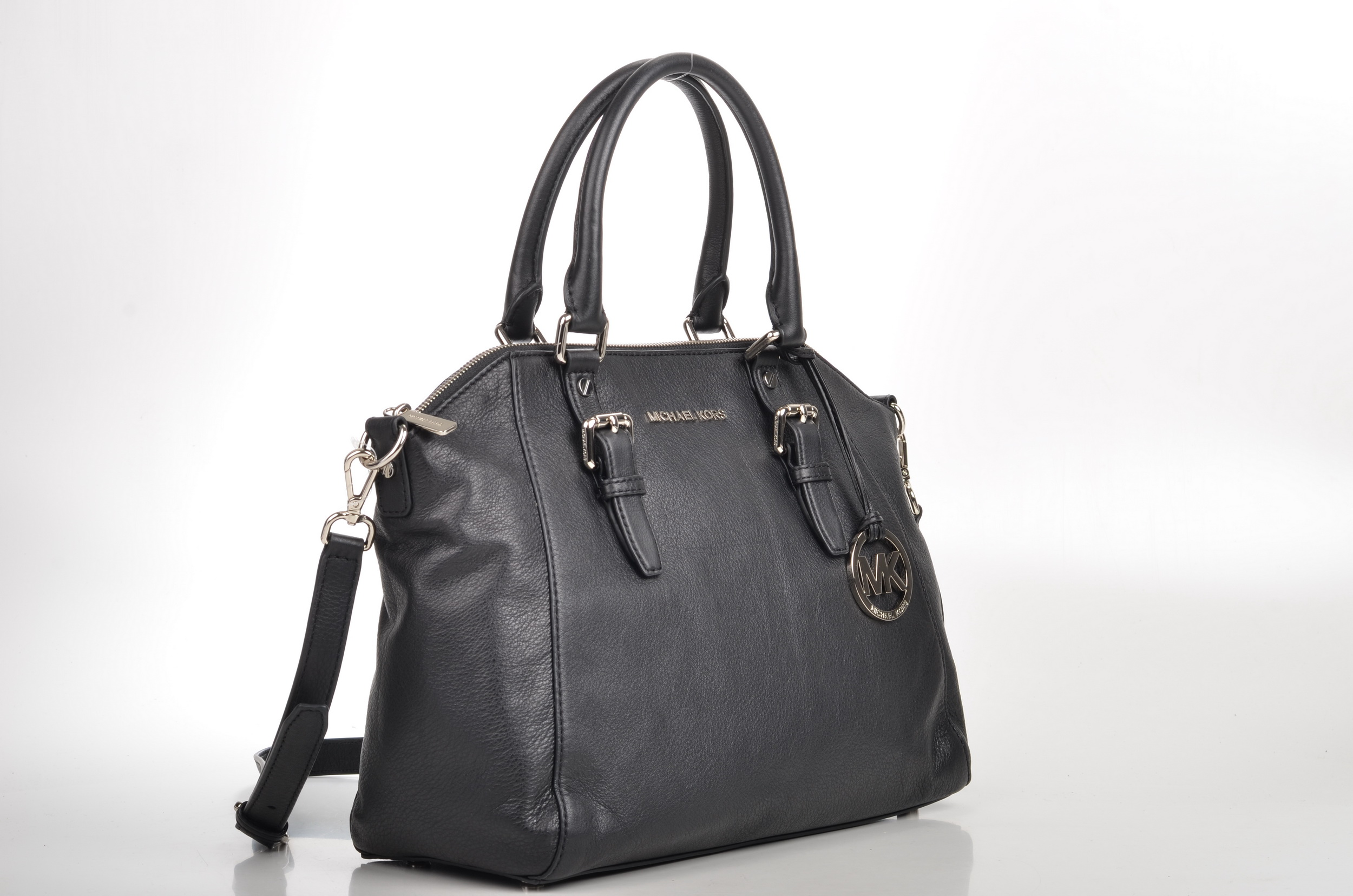
A Michael Kors handbag

Noticing the displays and garments, Bergdorf's fashion director Dawn Mello asked if he would show his collection to Bergdorf Goodman's buyers. In 1981, Kors launched his Michael Kors women's label at Bergdorf Goodman. In 1990, the company launched KORS Michael Kors as a licensee.

In 1993, the company was forced into a Chapter 11 filing, caused by the closure of the licensing partner for KORS Michael Kors. Putting the KORS line on hold, he designed for other labels before relaunching in 1997 with a lower-priced line, and in the same year was named the first women's ready-to-wear designer for French house Celine.

In 2002, Kors launched his menswear line. Kors left Celine in October 2003 to concentrate on his own brand via holding company Michael Kors Holdings Limited (MKH Ltd), relaunched with a majority $100 million investment from Canadian fashion investor Lawrence Stroll and his Hong Kong-based partner Silas Chou, who had previously purchased Tommy Hilfiger in 1989. John D. Idol was subsequently appointed CEO of the company, with a shareholding interest. The MICHAEL Michael Kors line was launched in 2004, which included women's handbags and shoes as well as women's ready-to-wear apparel.

In 2011, Stroll and Chou led an initial public offering in MKH Ltd on to the New York Stock Exchange, making them and Michael Kors billionaires. In June 2018, Chou sold the last of his investment in Kors.

In July 2017, MKH Ltd bought Jimmy Choo Ltd for £897 million. In September 2018, MKH Ltd announced a deal to take over Versace. The Italian fashion group was valued at $2.1 billion. Capri Holdings has planned to up Versace's global retail footprint from approximately 200 to 300 stores. On January 2, 2019 after closing the deal, the company was renamed to Capri Holdings.

Tapestry, Inc. agreed to acquire Capri for $8.5 billion in August 2023. In April 2024, the U.S. Federal Trade Commission sued to block the acquisition citing reduced competition between their brands, like Coach and Michael Kors, in the affordable luxury handbag market. It was also concerned that the deal would negatively impact hiring of workers and their wages. Responding to the suit, Tapestry and Capri said they would fight it in court with the aim of closing the transaction by the end of 2024. The merger was blocked on October 24, 2024. Capri and Tapestry committed to appealing the decision, but called off the merger the following month.

On April 10, 2025, Capri Holdings finalized the sale of Versace to Prada for 1.25 billion euros.

== Operations ==
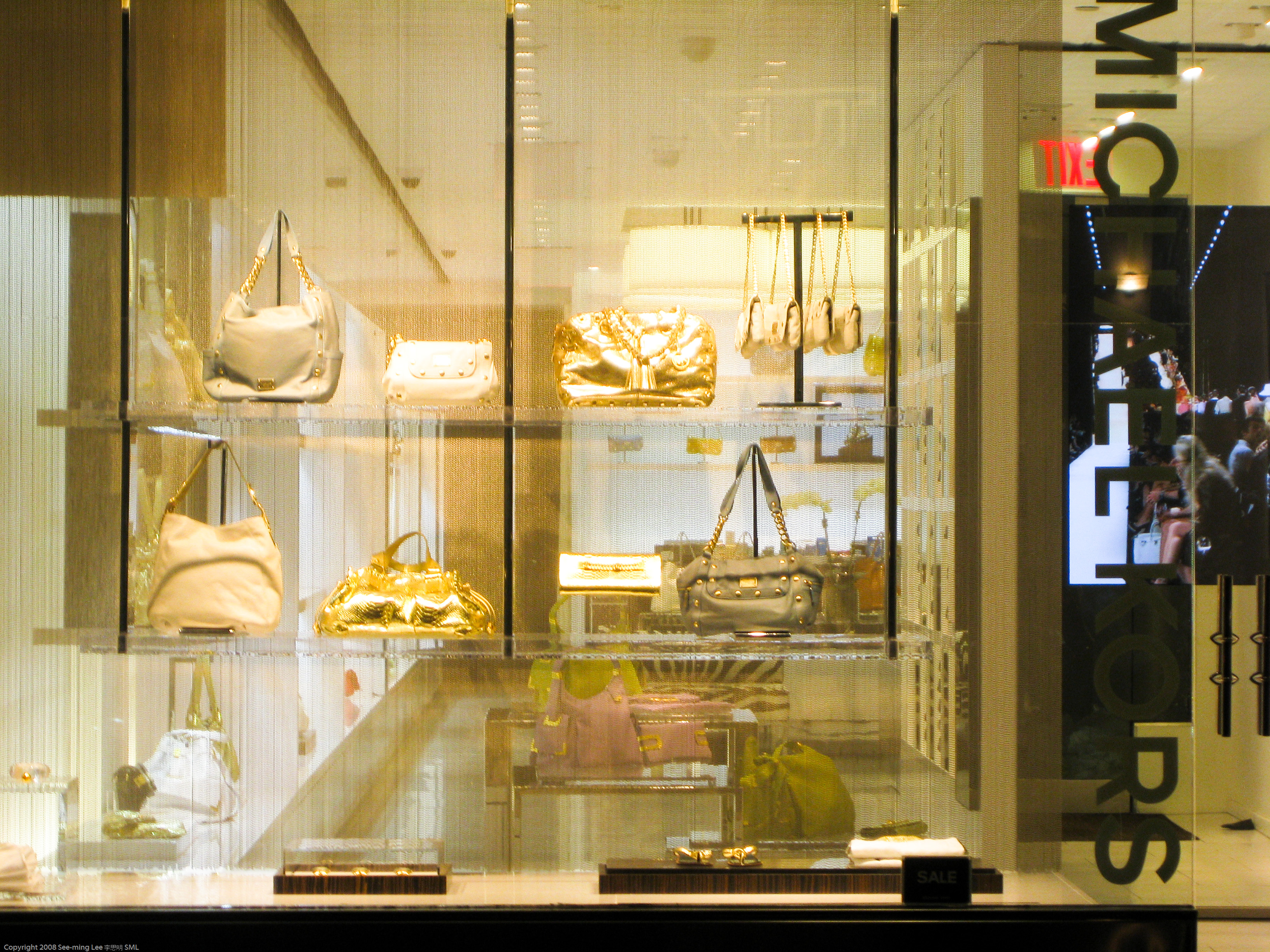
A Michael Kors purse shop

By 2014, the annual revenue for the company was $3.2 billion, with a net income of $670 million. By April 2017, the company had 827 full-price or outlet stores and 133 licensed stores. Since 2017, the company said that it would no longer use animal fur in any of its products. In 2018, Michael Kors announced two new stores, one in Waterloo, New York, as well as one in the Fairview Park Mall in Kitchener, Ontario.

Capri Holdings posted a $1.18 billion loss in fiscal 2025 as revenues decreased 21% from $5.6 billion to $4.4 billion.

== Trademark protection ==
In Canada, there had been multiple counterfeit Michael Kors bags, wallets, and other items in Montreal, Quebec. In an attempt to end the counterfeit production and to enforce trademark rights, the brand commenced actions against a major network of counterfeit suppliers and vendors, and raided multiple locations throughout the Greater Montreal Area in 2015.
