= August Heckscher =

German-American mining magnate

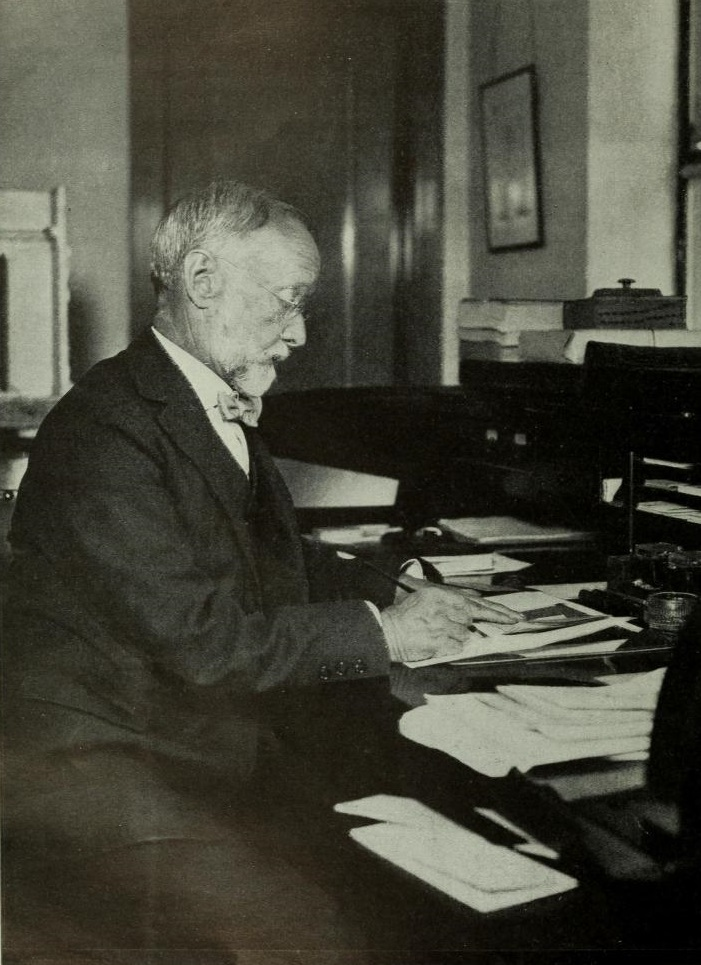
- Born: August 26, 1848; Hamburg, Germany
- Died: April 26, 1941 (aged 92); Mountain Lake, Florida, U.S.
- Spouses: Anna P. Atkins (m. 1881; died 1924) Virginia Henry Curtiss (m. 1930)
- Children: Maurice Heckscher; Antoinette Heckscher
- Parent(s): Johann Gustav Heckscher; Marie Antoinette Bräutigam
- Relatives: Richard Heckscher (cousin); August Heckscher II (grandson)

August Heckscher (August 26, 1848 – April 26, 1941) was a German-born American capitalist and philanthropist.

== Early life ==
Heckscher was born in Hamburg, Germany. He was the son of Johann Gustav Heckscher (1797–1865) and Marie Antoinette Bräutigam.

== Career ==
In 1867, Heckscher immigrated to the United States. He initially worked in his cousin Richard Heckscher's coal mining operation as a laborer, studying English at night. Several years later he formed a partnership with his cousin under the name of Richard Heckscher & Company. The firm was eventually sold to the Reading Railroad. Heckscher then turned to zinc mining and organized the Zinc and Iron Company, becoming vice-president and general manager. In 1897, it was consolidated with other zinc and iron companies into the New Jersey Zinc Company with Heckscher serving as the general manager.

== Philanthropy ==
Heckscher eventually became a multimillionaire and a philanthropist. He started The Heckscher Foundation for Children and created playgrounds in lower Manhattan and in Central Park. Heckscher Playground, Central Park's largest playground, is named in his honor. Heckscher also created Heckscher Park in the town of Huntington and created the Heckscher Museum of Art. The State of New York purchased nearly 1,500 acres in East Islip with money donated by Heckscher to create Heckscher State Park, made famous for hosting summer concerts for 35 years of the New York Philharmonic.

== Personal life ==
In 1881, he married Anna P. Atkins (1859–1924). Together, they were the parents of:

- Gustave Maurice Heckscher (1884–1967), who became an aviation pioneer and California real estate investor in the early 1900s.
- Antoinette Heckscher (1888–1965), who married British aristocrat and architect Capt. Oliver Sylvain Baliol Brett (later the 3rd Viscount Esher), son of Reginald Brett, 2nd Viscount Esher.

In 1930, he married Virginia Henry Curtiss (c. 1885 – 1941) at Croton-on-Hudson. She was the widow of Edwin Burr Curtiss, of A. G. Spalding Bros. and was 27 years younger than Heckscher.

August Heckscher died on April 26, 1941, in Mountain Lake, Florida and left his widow $10,000 and all his real estate. She died on July 11, 1941. No legatee could be found that was named in her will and the probate court declared an earlier copy of the will as valid.

=== Descendants ===
His grandson August Heckscher II (1913–1997), served as President John F. Kennedy's Special Consultant on the Arts, the first White House cultural adviser, 1962–1963, as well New York City Mayor John Lindsay's Parks Commissioner, 1967, amongst other highlights in a wide-ranging career and life.
