= International Society for Developmental Psychobiology =

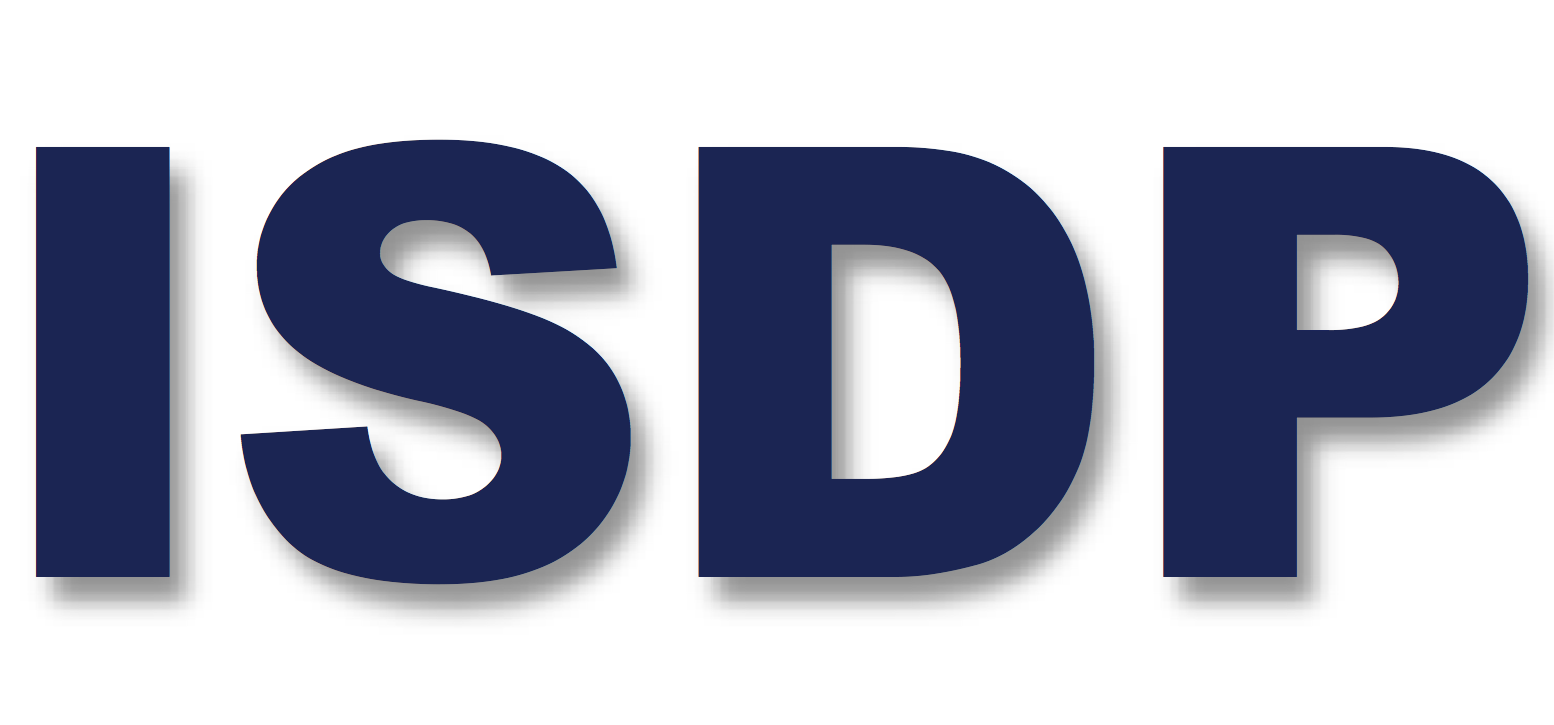
- International Society for Developmental Psychobiology
- Type: Nonprofit organization
- Purpose: Promote research in developmental psychobiology
- Headquarters: San Antonio, Texas
- Official language: English
- Key people: Pamela Hunt (president); Michele Brumley (Secretary); Gale Kleven (Treasurer); Hawley Montgomery-Downs (Conference Coordinator); Susan Swithers (Program Director)
- Website: www.isdp.org

International Society for Developmental Psychobiology (ISDP) promotes research on the behavioral development on all species including humans. It is an international-nonprofit organization.

== Journal ==
Its official scientific journal is Developmental Psychobiology published by John Wiley & Sons. It conducts annual meetings during which research on developmental psychobiology is presented and abstracts are published in Developmental Psychobiology.
