= The Heckscher Foundation for Children =

New York City-focused private foundation

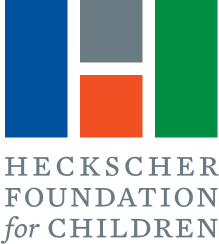
- Founded: 1921
- Founder: Charles August Heckscher
- Type: Private foundation
- Purpose: Child welfare: arts, education & academic support, social services, health, recreation, workforce development, capacity building & technical assistance
- Region served: New York City / metro area
- Method: Grants
- Key people: (Peter) Howard Sloane, chairman and chief executive officer Ourania Vokolos-Zias, chief operating officer
- Endowment: $400,000,000(2024) Howard Sloane
- Website: https://heckscherfoundation.org/

The Heckscher Foundation for Children is a New York City-focused private foundation that provides grants to underserved New York City youth. Often, the foundation's grant-giving takes the form of program support, capacity-building, and general operating support.

== Mission ==
The Heckscher Foundation seeks to level the playing field for underprivileged youth. It focuses on “inflection point” funding within a venture philanthropy framework. The Foundation considers specific obstacles that keep underserved youth from realizing their full potential and identifies key junctures, or inflection points, where grants might change the course of their lives. From there, the Foundation looks for innovative programs, partnerships, and solutions that address those junctures, and are grounded in positive, long-term outcomes, dividing giving into four main categories: Catalytic Giving, Strategic Partnerships, Targeted Problem Solving, and Proven Models.

== History ==
The Heckscher Foundation for Children was founded in 1921 by German-born industrialist, financier and philanthropist August Heckscher. Responding to a request for a donation for the purchase of a bus by the Society for the Prevention of Cruelty to Children, August Heckscher donated a Manhattan property on Fifth Avenue from 104th to 105th Street that opened as The Heckscher Foundation for Children in 1922 and provided housing for children and community activities.

However, the Great Depression of the 1930s resulted in the deterioration of the foundation's assets to the point of near collapse. August Heckscher recruited Arthur Smadbeck and Ruth Smadbeck, friends and financial equals who shared his dedication to public service to help rebuild the foundation.

Ruth Smadbeck began as a volunteer in the 1930s and ran the foundation for over 50 years, including its programs of dance, orchestra, exercise, swimming, the purchase and distribution of necessities for indigent children, a kindergarten, a theater, a craft room, a senior lounge, a photography group, a library, and a thrift shop. The Communications and Learning Center at Marymount Manhattan College is named for Ruth Smadbeck.

By the time of August Heckscher's death in 1941, foundation income was such that no distributions to charity were possible. From 1941 until his death in 1977, Arthur Smadbeck donated his time and efforts to disposing of losing foundation assets, consolidating others and creating a profitable platform on which he positioned the foundation to support major outside charitable efforts. At Ruth Smadbeck's death in 1986, distributions to charity had grown to $1,169,219 and assets had grown to $22,072,773. Renowned real estate entrepreneur and civic leader Louis Smadbeck became chairman of the foundation in 1986, and continued in this capacity until his death in 1992. Virginia Sloane was elected president in 1986, and presided over the foundation's philanthropic projects for some 25 years. In 2012, she became president emeritus. She died at the age of 91 on August 24, 2014.

In 1997, a new generation assumed leadership roles. Howard Sloane became chairman and CEO and continues to preside over the foundation's projects and programming. Today, the foundation's assets have grown to well over $300 million, and distributions to charity have dramatically increased.

== Funding approaches ==
The modern-day foundation practices grantmaking in four categories. In catalytic giving, the foundation funds approaches that have the potential for wide application but have not reached a scale broad enough to attract investment by larger private foundations or government. In strategic partnerships, the foundation promotes collaborations between foundations, not-for-profits, for-profits, and the public sector that may have overlapping approaches, goals, or skill sets in the areas of education, job skills, and innovative revenue models. In targeted problem solving, the foundation defines specific challenges that have attainable solutions and then encourages creative problem solvers to test those solutions, which often address barriers to equal opportunity that have been overlooked or under-appreciated. Finally, in proven models, the foundation provides grants to organizations and institutions whose work it is proud to have supported over multiple years.
